= Venice Beach =

Venice Beach may refer to:

- Venice Beach, Venice, Los Angeles, United States
  - Venice Beach Boardwalk
  - Venice Beach Skatepark
- Venice Beach in Half Moon Bay State Beach, United States

== See also ==
- Venice, Italy
