= Harry Perry =

Harry Perry may refer to:

- Harry Perry (musician) (born 1951), Venice Beach, California boardwalk musician
- Harry Perry (boxer) (1934–2021), member of the 1956 and 1960 Irish Olympic boxing teams
- Harry Perry (cricketer) (1895–1961), English cricketer
- Harry Perry (cinematographer) (1888–1985), American cinematographer

== See also ==
- Harold Perry (disambiguation)
- Henry Perry (disambiguation)
