= Henry Perry =

Henry Perry may refer to:

- Henry Perry (restaurateur) (1875–1940), restaurateur considered the "father of Kansas City barbecue"
- Henry Perry (writer) (1560s–1617), Welsh Anglican priest and linguistic scholar
- Henry Perry (British boxer) (1878–1969), British boxer
- Henry Perry (Irish boxer) (1934–2021), member of the 1956 and 1960 Irish Olympic boxing teams
- Henry George Thomas Perry (1889–1959), English-born political figure in British Columbia

== See also ==
- Harry Perry (disambiguation)
