= Harold Perry =

Harold Perry may refer to:

- Harold Robert Perry (1916–1991), clergyman
- Harold Perry (golfer) in Philadelphia Open Championship
- Harry Perry (musician) (born 1951)
- Harold Perry of Perrys Motor Sales

== See also ==
- Harry Perry (disambiguation)
- Hal Perry (disambiguation)
