= Venice Fishing Pier =

Pier in Venice, Los Angeles, California, U.S.

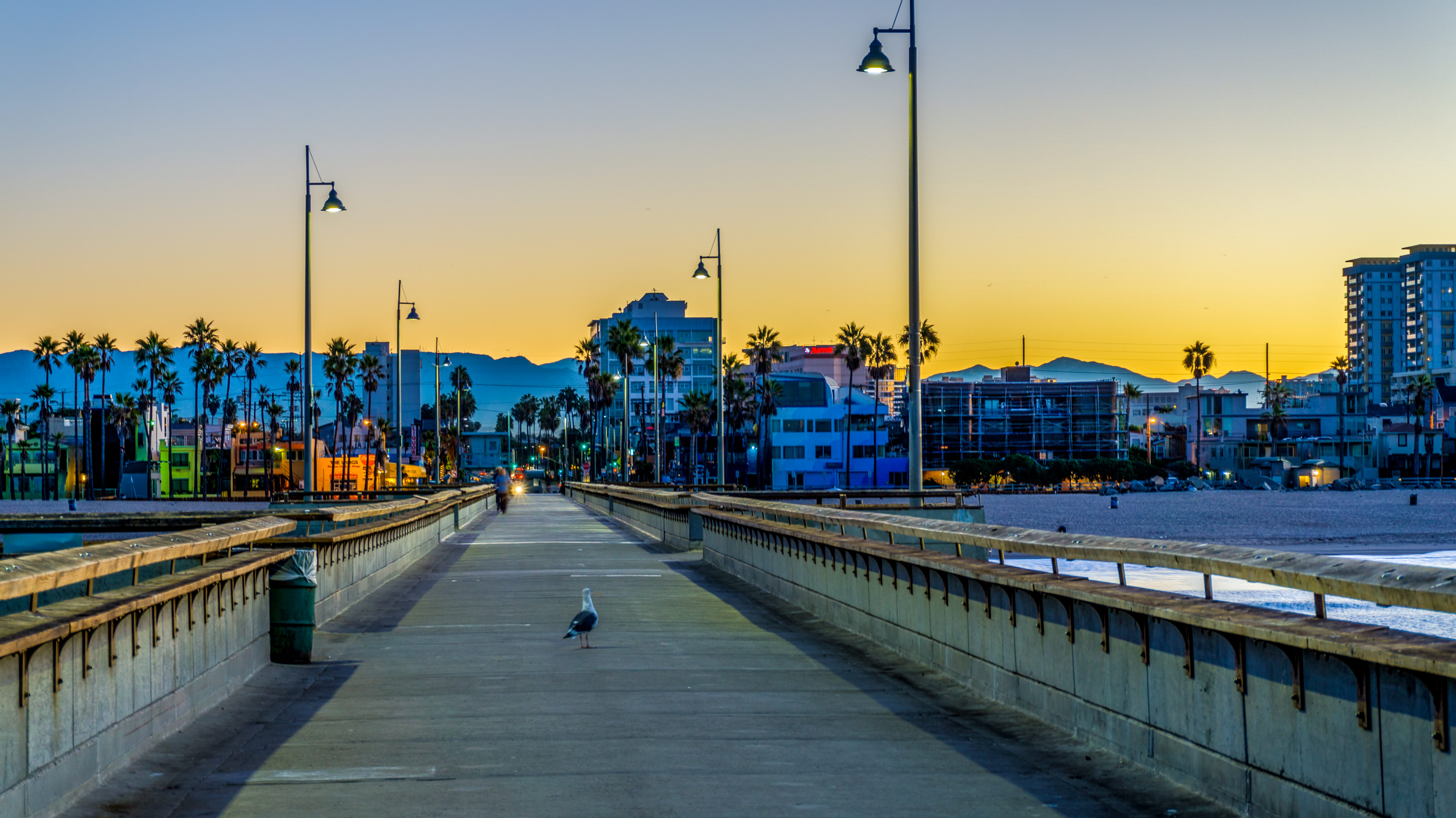
- The pier in 2014
- Coordinates: 33°58′40″N 118°28′9″W

History
- Interactive map of Venice Fishing Pier

Venice Fishing Pier is a pier in Venice, Los Angeles, in the U.S. state of California. The pier is part of Venice Beach Boardwalk and attracts between 28,000 and 30,000 visitors daily.

The current concrete structure was completed c. 1963. The pier was ordered closed in 1983 after waves tore out a concrete ramp to the pier and cut utility lines, and then closed again in November 1986 by the Los Angeles County Department of Beaches and Harbors after county engineers discovered apparently serious structural problems. The pier stood idle until 1997 when it finally reopened after a $4.5-million restoration and after activist pressure from Pier Pressure, a small group of Venice business people and residents.

According to Paste, the pier extends approximately 1,300 feet into the Pacific Ocean.

In 2018 the Venice Oceanarium proposed a new exhibited space for the pier.

The pier has also been featured in numerous films, most notably the 1993 neo-noir thriller Falling Down starring Micheal Douglas and Robert Duvall.
