= Hal Perry =

Hal Perry may refer to:

- Hal Perry (basketball) (1933–2009), American basketball player
- Hal Perry (politician) (born 1965), Canadian politician

== See also ==
- Harold Perry (disambiguation)
- Harry Perry (disambiguation)
