= Venice United Methodist Church =

United Methodist church

Church Sanctuary

The Venice United Methodist Church of Venice, California, is a member of the California-Pacific Conference within the United Methodist Church. It serves the Venice and Marina del Rey communities within the UMC Cal-Pac Los Angeles District.

== History ==
The Church was founded in 1913, as the First Methodist Church of Venice.

== Location ==
The campus is located on the southeast corner of Victoria Ave. and Lincoln Blvd., just one block north of Venice Blvd. The church is adjacent to the Venice Center for Peace with Justice and the Arts.

== Services ==
Venice United Methodist church celebrates worship on Sundays at 10:30 a.m. Services are between 60 and 75 minutes long. Following the service, everyone is invited to share a bit of refreshment during our “hospitality” time in the parlor, before they carry on with their day.

The worship contains the familiar and some unfamiliar: elements of music, prayer, Scripture reading, & prophetic witness.

On the first Sunday of each month the congregation celebrates communion. At this communion table, everyone is invited into the full life of the church.

== Pastor and Staff ==
=== Pastor ===
Benedicta Ogbonnaya is now pastoring Venice United Methodist Church which meets on Sundays at 10:30AM.

=== Staff ===
not named

== Community service ==
=== Youth Programs ===
none

=== Assistance Programs ===
The congregation maintains an emergency food pantry and a people in crisis fund, for those who find themselves in momentary crisis.

=== Institutional Collaborations ===
The VUMC collaborates with other organizations and provides space, support, and encouragement for programs that nurture, guide, and provide safety for youth, feed the hungry, promote a living wage and universal health care, and promote non-violence and conflict transformation. They strive for peace with justice, responsible consumption and production practices, and ecological respect.

Some of these organizations are tenants of the VCPJA, the two story community center on the VUMC campus: Inside Out Community Arts and Easter Seals.
