= Venice Art Walls =

Art walls in Venice, Los Angeles, California, U.S.

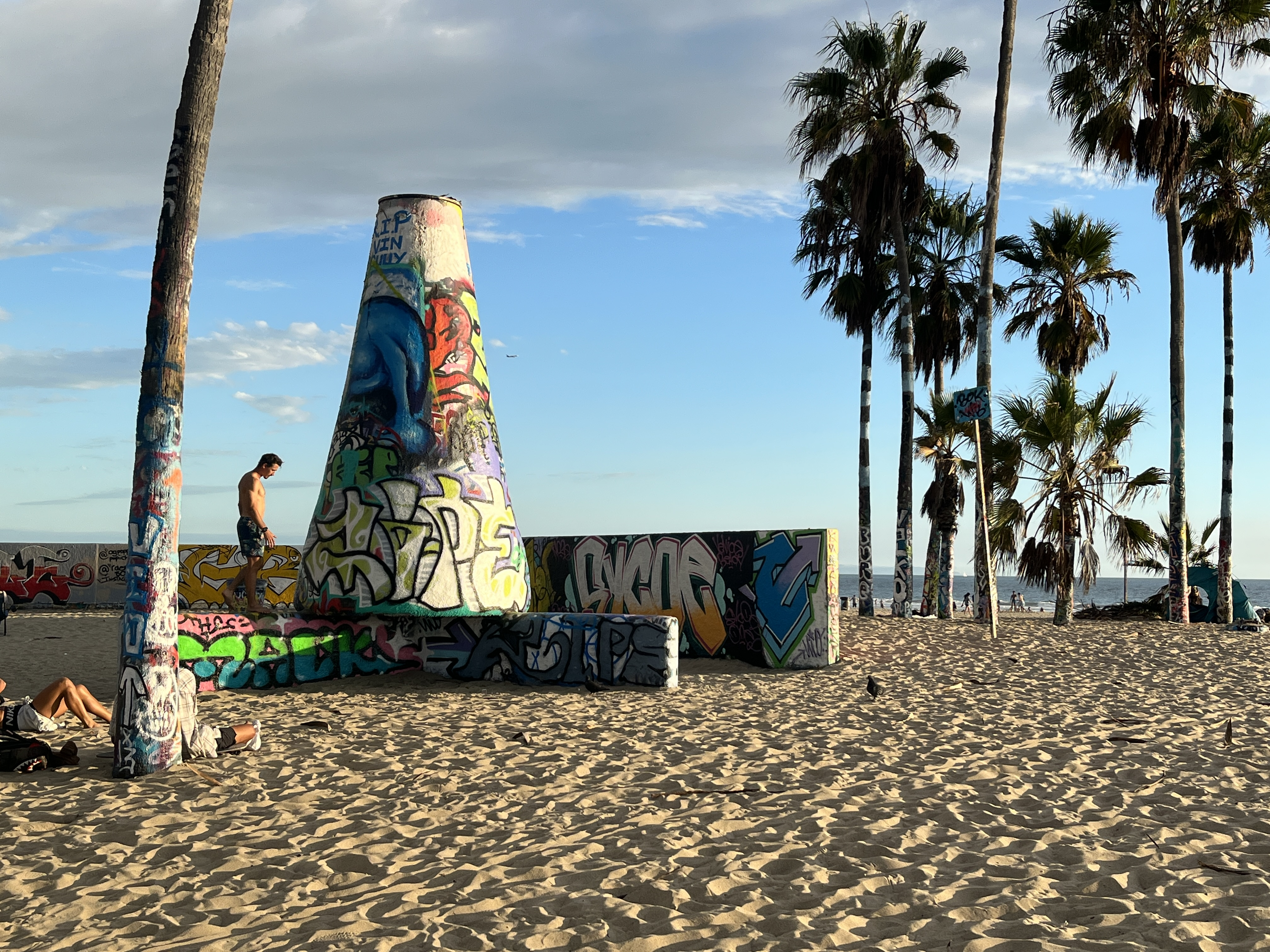
- Part of the Venice Art Walls, 2022

- Location within California
- Coordinates: 33.98642°N 118.47491°W

The Venice Art Walls are murals along the Venice Beach Boardwalk in Venice, Los Angeles, in the U.S. state of California.

According to David J. Del Grande of the Arizona Daily Star, "Venice Art Walls offers graffiti writers a place to paint and tag, with their creations curated by local graffiti production company Setting the Pace. The Setting the Pace foundation began managing the Venice Art Walls in 2012, and the group has since organized mural workshops for students and young artists."

According to Paste, artists with "prearranged permits can legally tag and create". The site has been mentioned as an example of a deterrent to graffiti elsewhere. In 2019, Thrillist's Lizbeth Scordo said the "ever-changing" walls between Windward and Market "actually date back to the '60s (though painting them only became technically legal in the last 20 years), and you can watch artists add to the colorful history on weekends".
