= Gamekings =

Dutch television show

- Starring: David van Arragon; Jan-Johan Belderok; Melle Broekmans; Dennis de Bruin; Emiel Kampen; Jelle Kunst; Steven Saunders; Shelly van Seventer; Richard 'Skate' Simon; Boris van de Ven; Pascal Vugts
- Country of origin: Netherlands
- Original language: Dutch

Production
- Producer: Blammo Media
- Running time: 47 minutes

Original release
- Network: Comedy Central
- Release: 2002 – present

Gamekings is a Dutch television program centered on videogames broadcast on Comedy Central in The Netherlands. Until 2005 it was broadcast on the former Dutch television channel The Box, until 2011 on TMF and until 2014 on MTV. Since then, they have moved to Spike TV and are now working under their own Label Blammo Media, while also being sponsored by fans with their 'Gamekings Premium' service.

In the program, the presenters give their opinion about new videogames, but you see them living the "gamer life" as well. The program was named the equivalent of 'Top Gear' for games by Nieuwe Revu Magazine.
