= Harry Perry (cricketer) =

English cricketer

Personal information
- Born: 7 March 1895; Oldswinford, Worcestershire, England
- Died: 28 February 1961 (aged 65); Stourbridge, England
- Batting: Right-handed
- Bowling: Right-arm medium

Domestic team information
- Years: Team
- 1927–1928: Worcestershire

Career statistics
Competition	FC
Matches	5
Runs scored	109
Batting average	15.57
100s/50s	0/0
Top score	40
Balls bowled	60
Wickets	1
Bowling average	47.00
5 wickets in innings	0
10 wickets in match	0
Best bowling	1-39
Catches/stumpings	13/0
- Source: , 3 August 2008

Harry Perry (7 March 1895–28 February 1961) was an English first-class cricketer who played five games for Worcestershire in the late 1920s.

His highest score was the 40 he made against Yorkshire in his second match, while his single first-class wicket came in his last innings, when with the final ball of his career he dismissed Hampshire's John Parker.
