= Harry Perry (musician) =

American musician and busker (born 1952)

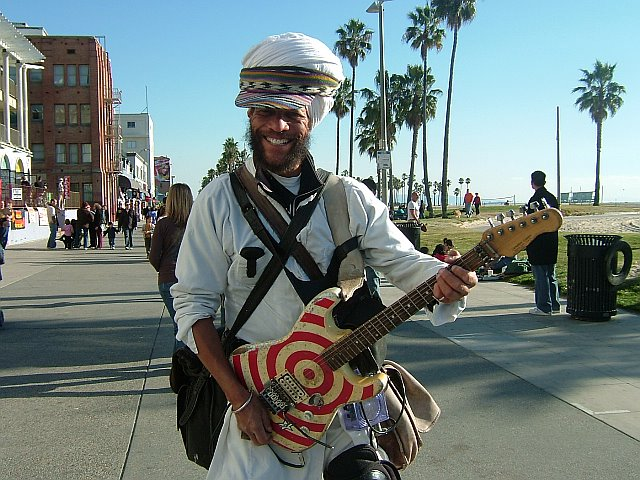
- Perry performing on Venice Beach Boardwalk

Background information
- Born: Harold Arthur Perry; May 19, 1952 (age 74)
- Origin: Detroit, Michigan, US
- Genres: Rock, alternative rock
- Occupations: Singer-songwriter, multi-instrumentalist, composer, arranger, record producer, author, poet
- Instruments: Vocals, guitar
- Years active: 1973–present
- Website: harryperryband.com

Harry Perry (born Harold Arthur Perry; 19 May 1952) is an American musician and busker, known for playing an electric guitar with a target design on roller skates at the Venice Beach Boardwalk. Perry is also known by his Sikh name, Har Nar Singh Khalsa (he often performed wearing a traditional Sikh turban), and by his stage name, Kama Kosmic Krusader.

== Life and career ==
Perry was born on March 5, 1952, in Detroit, Michigan. After growing up in Michigan and recording with his first band there, Perry began performing his original songs and guitar compositions on the Venice Beach Boardwalk in 1973. Perry typically used distortion effects and played in a style reminiscent of Jimi Hendrix or Eddie Van Halen. Perry has played with bands such as the Grateful Dead and Jane's Addiction.

In addition to being a well-known musician performing at the Venice Beach Boardwalk, he is also a skater, first on traditional roller skates, then on inline skates, and finally on LandRoller skates.

During the early 1990s, the Los Angeles City Council passed an ordinance banning people from performing publicly on the Venice Beach Boardwalk. In response, Perry became a named plaintiff in a class action lawsuit in U.S. District Court against the Los Angeles Police Department and the ordinance. The plaintiffs based their suit on various constitutional principles that provide for freedom of expression, commerce, and congregation. After many years of litigation, The U.S. Ninth Circuit Court of Appeals ruled in favor of Perry and his co-plaintiffs; however, their victory was short lived. The Los Angeles City Council created new legislation that severely restricted performance on the Venice Beach Boardwalk rather than banning it altogether. In addition, the City of Santa Monica followed the Los Angeles City Council's lead, passing statutes that limited the ability of performers like Perry to sell CDs and T-shirts to their audiences. Perry and others initiated legal action in response, alleging that the combination of gentrification and the performance restriction ordinances threatened to destroy the atmosphere and commerce that made Venice Beach the social mecca for which it was famous.

Perry is dedicated to health and fitness, running twenty miles daily and practicing Kundalini yoga. Perry is a non-smoking vegetarian.

As of 2026, Perry continues to entertain on the Venice Boardwalk where he sells his t-shirts as the self-proclaimed "Kama Kosmic Krusader of Venice Beach."

== Discography ==
=== Video Commander (2006) ===
Track list:

1. "Xman Can't Save Me Now"
2. "Queen of Robot World"
3. "Time Travel Freaks"
4. "Love Jet"
5. "Hot Rod Lincoln"
6. "Intro to Invaders"
7. "Video Commander"
8. "Music Maker"
9. "Guiding Forces"
10. "Gambling Man"

=== Greatest Hits of the Millennium (2007) ===
Track list:

1. "Heads of Skin"
2. "Invaders"
3. "Nam Myoho Renge Kyo"
4. "World of Freaks"
5. "Out of Control"
6. "Message"
7. "Zoo Man"
8. "How Soon Is Now?"
9. "Zoo Man (reprise)"

== Filmography and television appearances ==
Harry Perry had numerous cameo appearances in several films and television programs, such as:

Fletch (1985), Dragnet (1987),White Men Can't Jump (1992) and its 2023 remake, Gift and Point of No Return (1993) - for which he also performed one song on the soundtrack -, Marching out of Time (1993), Tenacious D in The Pick of Destiny (2006) and Starstruck (2010), as well as the television shows CSI, Vengeance Unlimited, Heroes and In the Heat of The Night (episode "No Country Boy"). He also appeared on the Dutch television program Gamekings and on America's Next Top Model.

Perry can be seen in beginning of the music video for "Party Train" by The Gap Band. He appeared in the music videos for Michael Nesmith's "Cruisin'", found on his 1981 Elephant parts DVD, and the Red Hot Chili Peppers' "The Adventures of Rain Dance Maggie" from their 2011 album I'm with You. Perry can also be seen in the 1982 documentary, Contemporary Photography in the USA, behind Garry Winogrand. He appears in the credits of VAMPS DVD, Vamps Live 2009 USA.

On September 6 and 7, 2013, Perry performed at the Hollywood Bowl with the Blue Man Group in a rendition of Boléro.
