= Venice Beach Skatepark =

Skatepark in Venice, California, U.S.

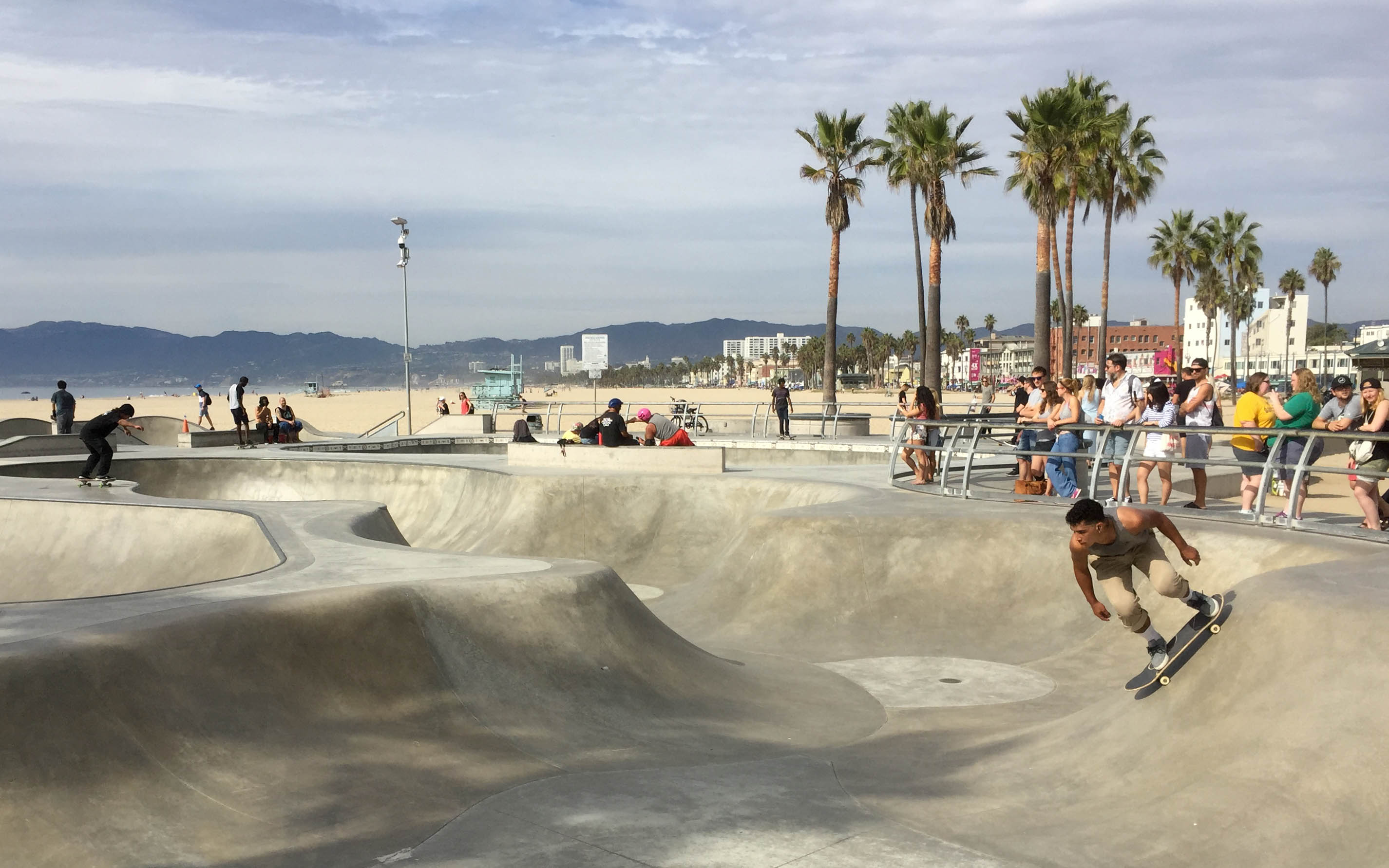
- Interactive map of Venice Beach Skatepark
- Type: Skatepark
- Location: Venice, Los Angeles
- Coordinates: 33.9871°N 118.4755°W
- Area: 16,000 Sq. Ft.
- Opened: October 2009
- Operator: City of Los Angeles Department of Recreation and Parks
- Terrain: Concrete

The Venice Beach Skatepark is a public skatepark located in Venice, Los Angeles. It opened in late 2009. It is also officially known as the Dennis "Polar Bear" Agnew Memorial Skatepark, named after famed Z-Boy skater Dennis Agnew. The 16,000 square foot park is located near Windward Avenue and Ocean Front Walk street. The skate park features steps, rails, and bowls that resemble empty swimming pools. The park cost $3.4 million to build, and the funds came from the sale of surplus city property in Venice.

== History ==
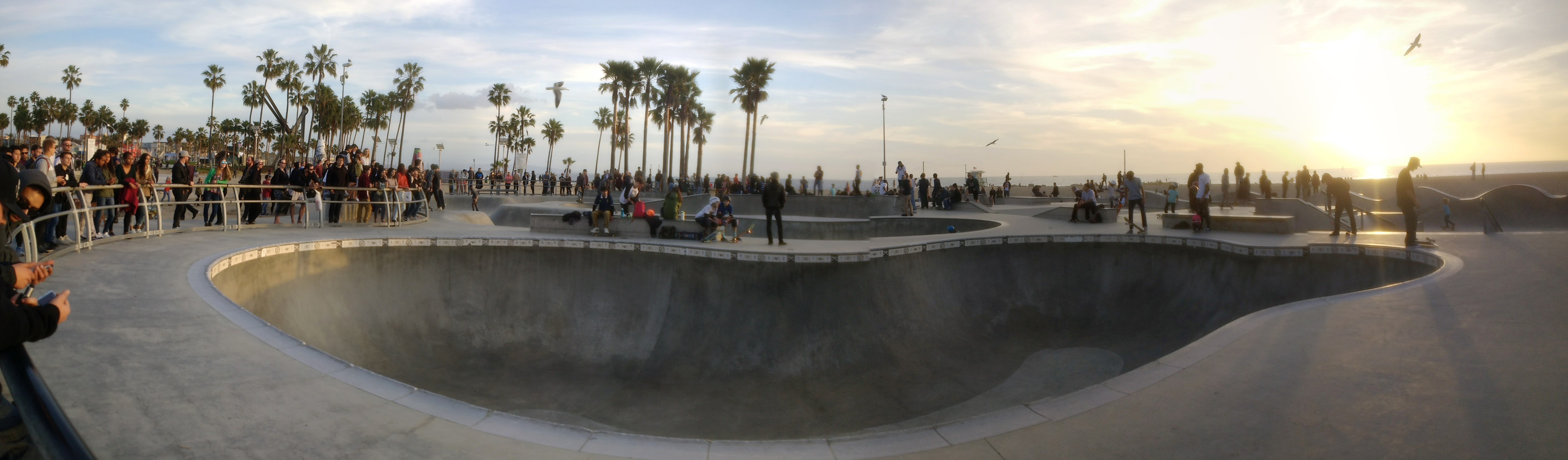
Audience watching skateboarders during a competition.

Venice Beach has been host to a number of well known skate spots throughout the history of skateboarding. From the backyard bowls to the concrete plaza covered in graffiti, the landscapes of Venice, California were integral to the development of skateboarding. Starting in the 2000s, a group of Venice locals, headed by Jesse Martinez, organized an effort to build the Venice Beach Skatepark.

In April 2020, the park was covered in sand to discourage gatherings during the COVID-19 pandemic.

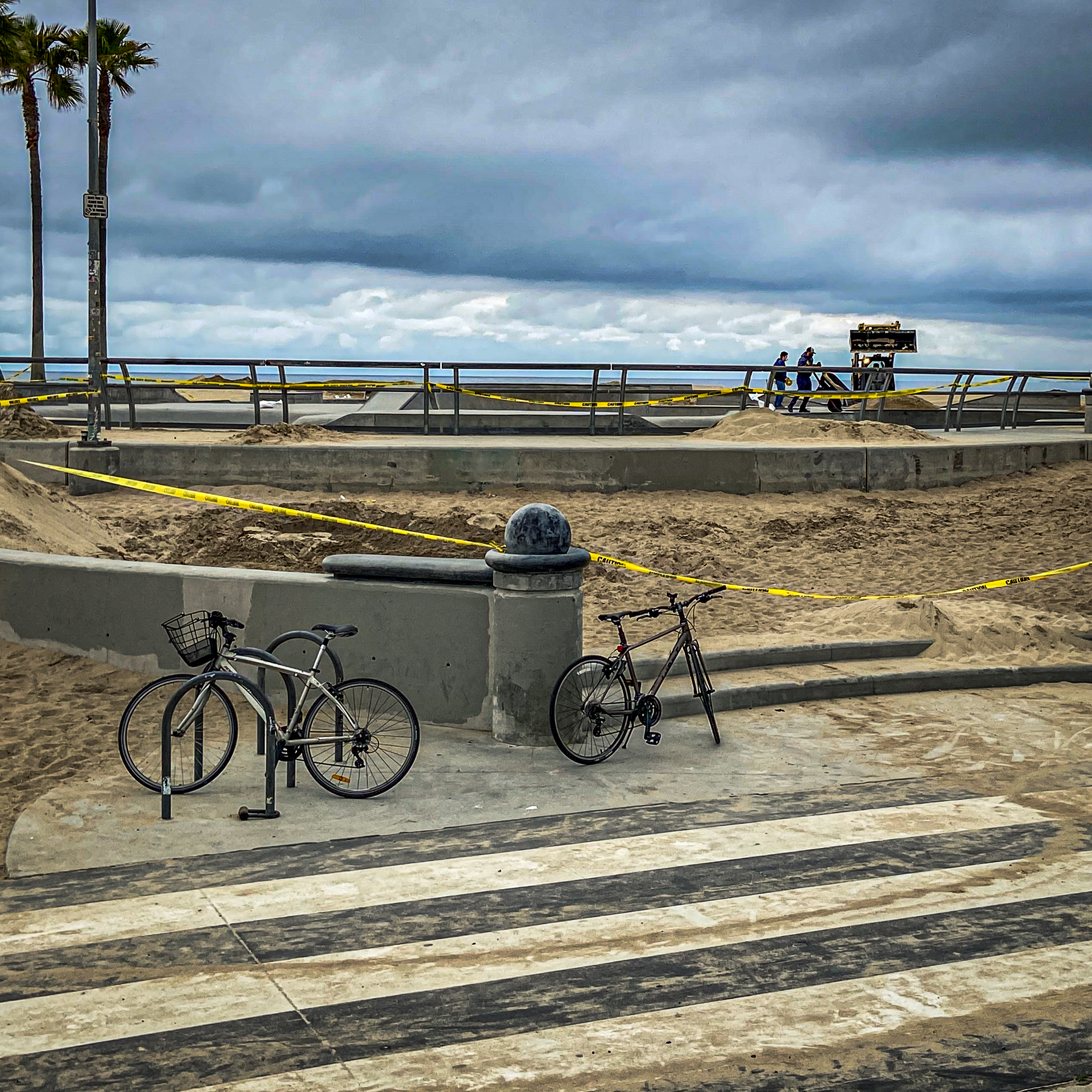
Venice Skate Park filled with sand during pandemic, April 2020.
