= Harry Perry (boxer) =

Irish boxer (1934–2021)

Henry Perry
Personal information
- Nationality: Irish
- Born: 2 December 1934; Dublin, Ireland
- Died: 22 January 2021 (aged 86)

Sport
- Sport: Boxing

Harry Perry (2 December 1934 – 22 January 2021) was a member of the 1956 and 1960 Irish Olympic boxing teams. He also competed in the European Amateur Boxing Championships in 1955 and 1959 winning the bronze medal in the welterweight division in 1959. He was inducted into the Irish Boxing Hall of Fame in 2007.

He died in January 2021, aged 86.

== See also ==
- Boxing at the 1956 Summer Olympics
- Boxing at the 1960 Summer Olympics
