= Venice Beach Boardwalk =

Promenade in Venice, Los Angeles, California, U.S.

Coordinates: 33.983°N 118.4703°W

- Promenade
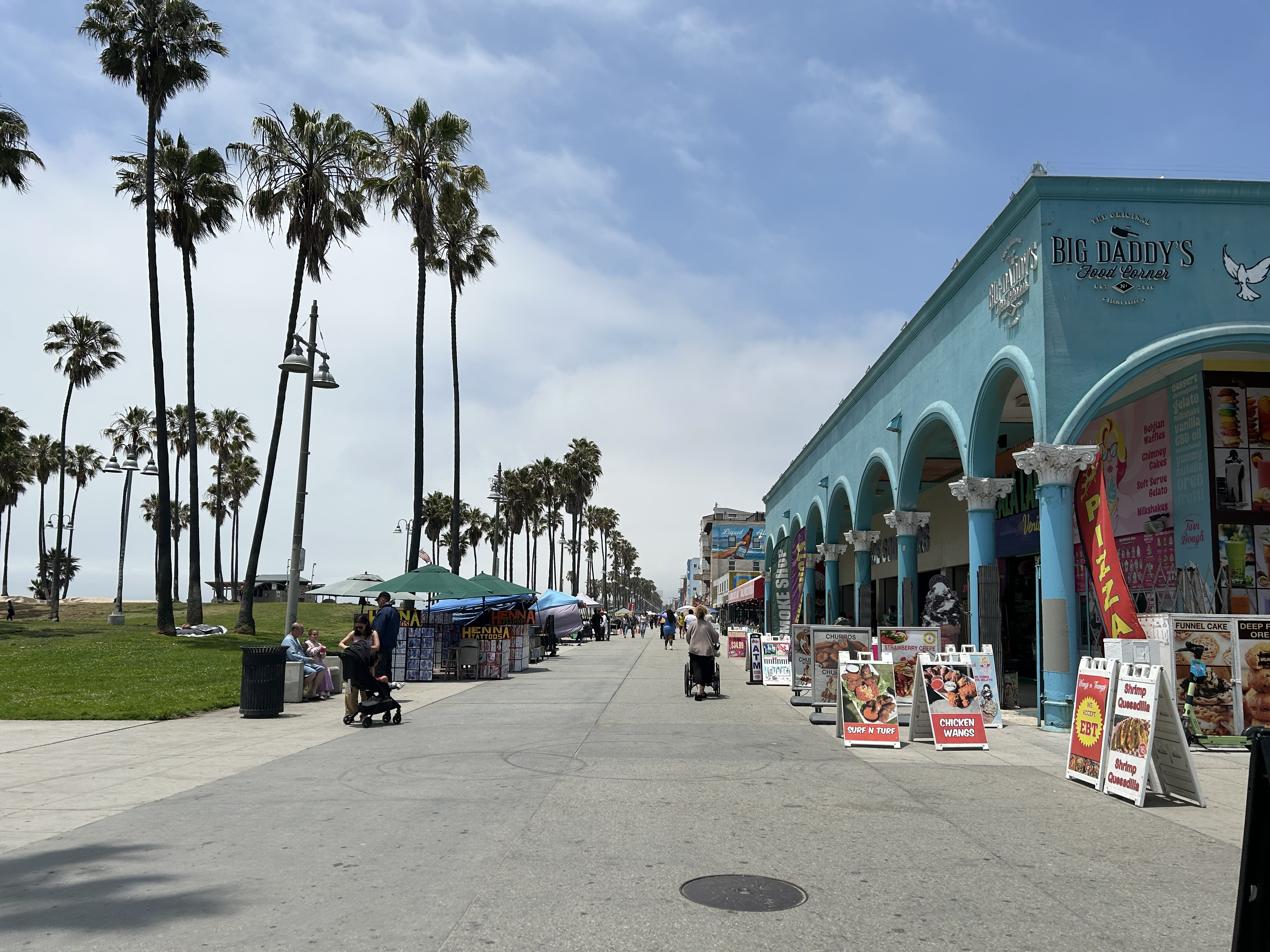
- Features: Muscle Beach Venice; Venice Beach Skatepark; Beach Bike Path; Venice Art Walls
- Design: Abbot Kinney
- Opened: 1905
- Length: 2 miles (3.2 km)
- Surface: Concrete
- Manager: City of Los Angeles Department of Recreation and Parks
- Location: Venice Beach
- Interactive map of Venice Beach Boardwalk

The Venice Beach Boardwalk is a two-mile promenade stretching parallel to Venice Beach. In the north, the Boardwalk connects to the Santa Monica Boardwalk, and it terminates in Marina del Rey in the south. Notable attractions along the Venice Beach Boardwalk include Muscle Beach Venice, the Venice Beach Skatepark, a segment of the Beach Bike Path which also serves pedestrians and skaters, the Venice Art Walls, and numerous volleyball courts. The Venice Beach Boardwalk attracts approximately 28,000 to 30,000 tourists daily, attracting approximately 10 million visitors per year and is the 2nd-largest tourist attraction in Southern California after Disneyland.

== In popular culture ==
Several films have been filmed on the Boardwalk, including Barbie, Nightcrawler, and A Nightmare on Elm Street.

The video for George Benson's 1980 song Give Me the Night was partially filmed on the Boardwalk and showed him roller skating on the Bike Path.
