= 2022 Los Angeles elections =

- November 8, 2022

8 out of 15 seats in the City Council 8 seats needed for a majority
	Majority party	Minority party
Party	Democratic	Independent
Seats before	14	1
Seats won	8	0
Seats after	14	1
Seat change	Steady	Steady

3 out of 7 seats in the LAUSD Board of Education 4 seats needed for a majority
	Majority party	Minority party
Party	Democratic	Republican
Seats before	6	1
Seats won	3	0
Seats after	6	1
Seat change	Steady	Steady

The 2022 Los Angeles elections were held on June 7, 2022. Voters elected candidates in a nonpartisan primary, with runoff elections scheduled for November 8, 2022. Eight of the fifteen seats in the City Council were up for election while three of the seven seats in the LAUSD Board of Education were up for election. The seat of Mayor of Los Angeles was up for election due to incumbent Eric Garcetti's term limit. The seats of the Los Angeles City Controller and the Los Angeles City Attorney were also up for election, as their incumbents, Mike Feuer and Ron Galperin, were running for mayor and California State Controller respectively.

Municipal elections in California are officially nonpartisan; candidates' party affiliations do not appear on the ballot.

== Mayor ==
2022 Los Angeles mayoral election
Primary election
Candidate	Votes	%
Karen Bass	278,511	43.11
Rick Caruso	232,490	35.99
Kevin de León	50,372	7.79
Gina Viola	44,341	6.86
Mike Feuer	12,087	1.87
Andrew Kim	9,405	1.46
Alex Gruenenfelder Smith	6,153	0.95
Joe Buscaino	4,485	0.69
Craig Greiwe	2,439	0.38
Mel Wilson	2,336	0.36
Ramit Varma	1,916	0.30
John "Jsamuel" Jackson	1,511	0.23
Write-in	12	0.01
Total votes	646,058	100.00
General election
Karen Bass	506,372	54.82%
Rick Caruso	417,375	45.18%
Total votes	923,747	100.00

== City Attorney ==
=== Results ===
2022 Los Angeles City Attorney election
Primary election
Candidate	Votes	%
Faisal Gill	137,554	24.23
Hydee Feldstein Soto	112,978	19.90
Marina Torres	112,842	19.87
Richard Kim	93,660	16.50
Kevin James	51,606	9.09
Teddy Kapur	30,421	5.36
Sherri Onica Valle Cole	28,716	5.06
Total votes	567,777	100.00
General election
Hydee Feldstein Soto	440,211	55.36%
Faisal Gill	354,941	44.64%
Total votes	795,152	100.00

== City Controller ==
=== Results ===
2022 Los Angeles City Controller election
Primary election
Candidate	Votes	%
Kenneth Mejia	240,374	43.12
Paul Koretz	131,921	23.67
Stephanie Clements	88,678	15.91
David T. Vahedi	39,240	7.04
James O'Gabhann III	21,984	3.94
Reid Lidow	21,769	3.90
Rob Wilcox	13,460	2.41
Total votes	557,426	100.00
General election
Kenneth Mejia	509,757	63.32
Paul Koretz	295,338	36.68
Total votes	805,095	100.00

== City council ==
=== District 1 ===
Los Angeles City Council District 1 election
- June 7, 2022
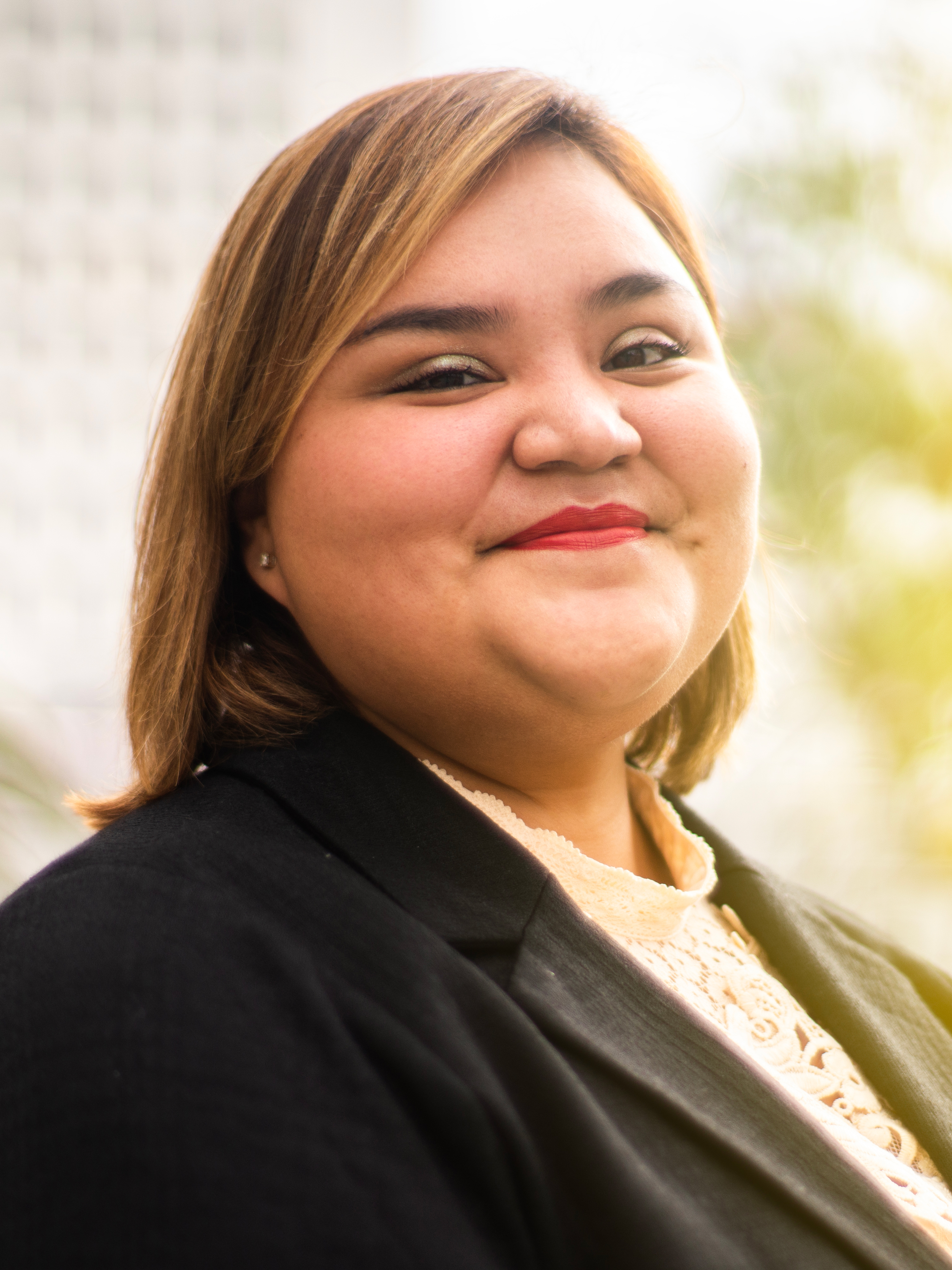

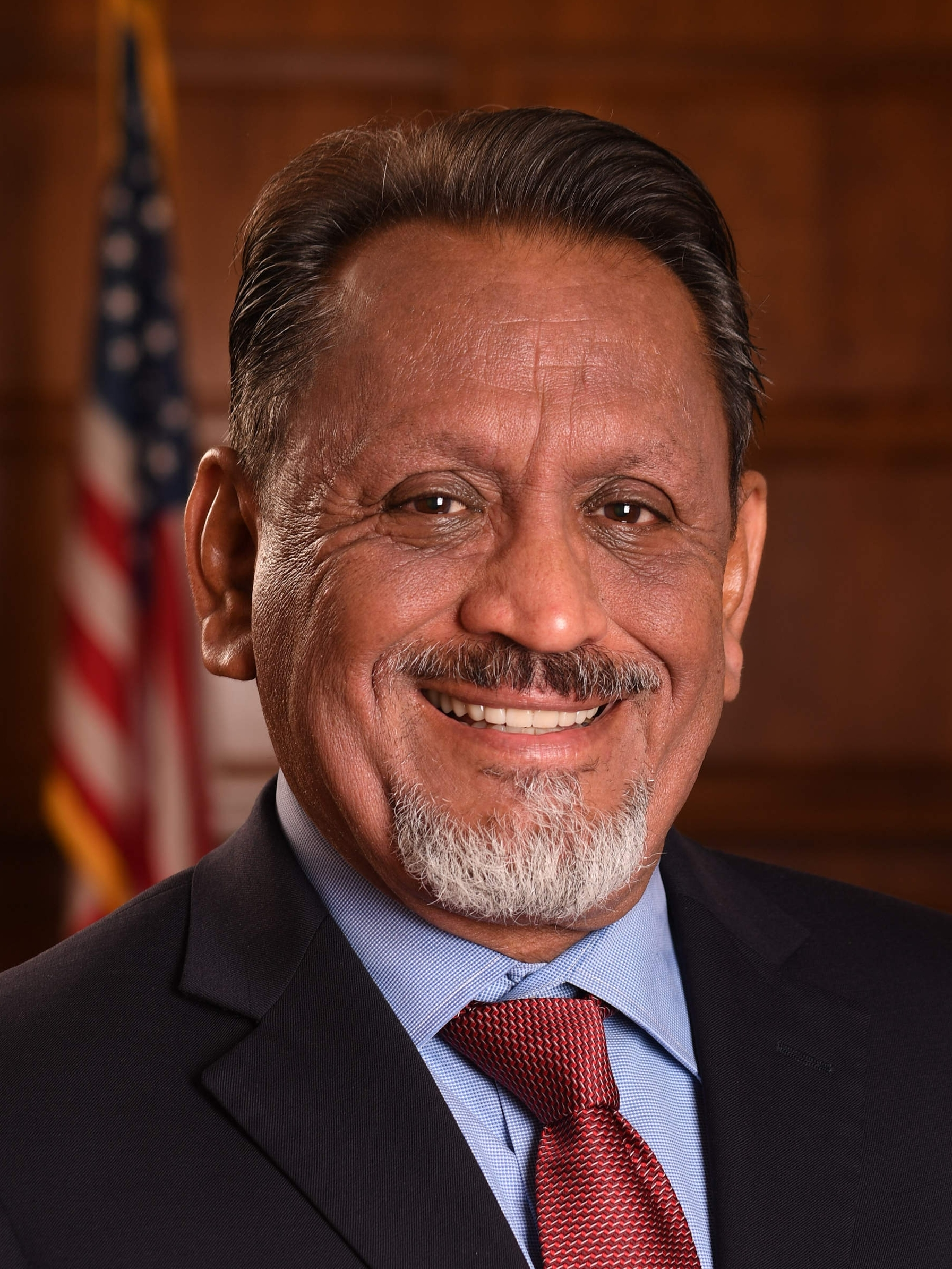
Candidate	Eunisses Hernandez	Gil Cedillo
First round	16,108; 53.89%	13,700; 45.84%
- Results by precinct Hernandez: 50–60% 60–70% 70–80% 80–90% 90-100% Cedillo: 50–60% 60–70% 70–80% No results
City Councilmember before election
Gil Cedillo
Elected City Councilmember
Eunisses Hernandez

==== Candidates ====
===== Declared =====
- Gil Cedillo, incumbent councilmember
- Eunisses Hernandez, public policy advocate

===== Did not make ballot =====
- Elaine Alaniz, filmmaker and crisis responder
- Ronald Duarte, community organizer
- Jesus Jesse Rosas, former LAUSD employee

===== Withdrew =====
- Brian Morrison, member of the Los Feliz Neighborhood Council

==== Endorsements ====
Gil Cedillo

U.S. senators

- Alex Padilla, U.S. senator from California
- Bernie Sanders, U.S. senator from Vermont

Statewide officials

- Eleni Kounalakis, 50th lieutenant governor of California

State assemblymembers

- Anthony Rendon, 70th Speaker of the California State Assembly

District Attorneys

- George Gascón, 43rd Los Angeles County District Attorney

Los Angeles County officials

- Janice Hahn, member of the Los Angeles County Board of Supervisors
- Hilda Solis, member of the Los Angeles County Board of Supervisors

Labor unions

- Los Angeles County Federation of Labor
- United Farm Workers

Organizations

- Armenian National Committee of America
- Los Angeles County Democratic Party
Eunisses Hernandez

City councilmembers

- Mike Bonin, member of the Los Angeles City Council for the 11th district

Los Angeles County officials

- Holly Mitchell, member of the Los Angeles County Board of Supervisors

Individuals

- Dolores Huerta, labor leader

Organizations

- California Working Families Party
- Democratic Socialists of America
- Our Revolution

Newspapers and other media

- Los Angeles Times

==== Results ====
2022 Los Angeles City Council District 1 election
Primary election
Candidate	Votes	%
Eunisses Hernandez	16,108	53.89
Gil Cedillo (incumbent)	13,700	45.84
Elaine Alaniz (write-in)	80	0.27
Total votes	29,888	100.00

=== District 3 ===
Los Angeles City Council District 3
- June 7, 2022
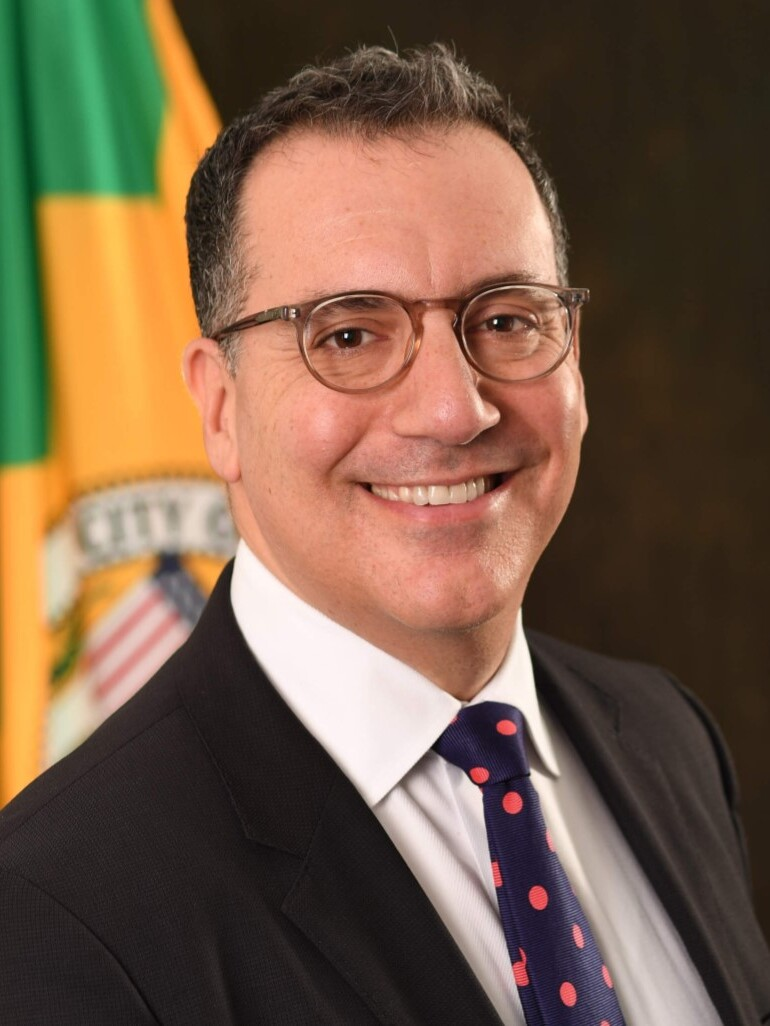

Candidate	Bob Blumenfield	Scott Silverstein
First round	24,659; 66.42%	12,469; 33.58%
- Results by precinct Blumenfield: 50–60% 60–70% 70–80% 80–90% 90-100%
Councilmember before election
Bob Blumenfield
Elected Councilmember
Bob Blumenfield

==== Candidates ====
===== Declared =====
- Bob Blumenfield, incumbent councilmember
- Scott Silverstein, businessman

===== Did not make ballot =====
- Chris Champion, businessman
- John Hernandez
- Mikhail Maniyan, businessman

===== Withdrew =====
- Yasmine Pomeroy, educator
- Alexander Tsao

==== Endorsements ====
Bob Blumenfield

Organizations

- Los Angeles County Democratic Party
- Valley Industry & Commerce Association

Newspapers and other media

- Los Angeles Times
Scott Silverstein

Newspapers and other media

- Los Angeles Daily News

==== Results ====
2022 Los Angeles City Council District 3 election
Primary election
Candidate	Votes	%
Bob Blumenfield (incumbent)	24,659	66.42
Scott Silverstein	12,469	33.58
Total votes	37,128	100.00

=== District 5 ===
Los Angeles City Council District 5 election
- November 8, 2022
- Registered: 1,608,639
- Turnout: 28.58%
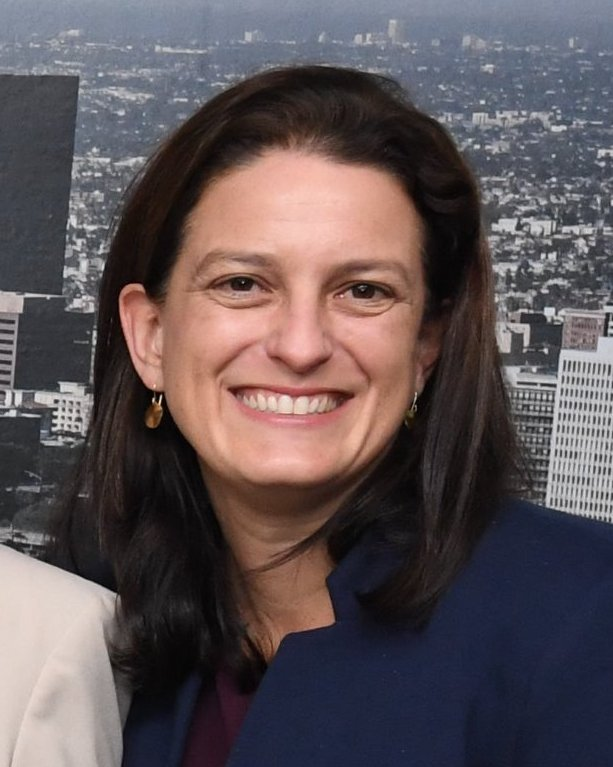

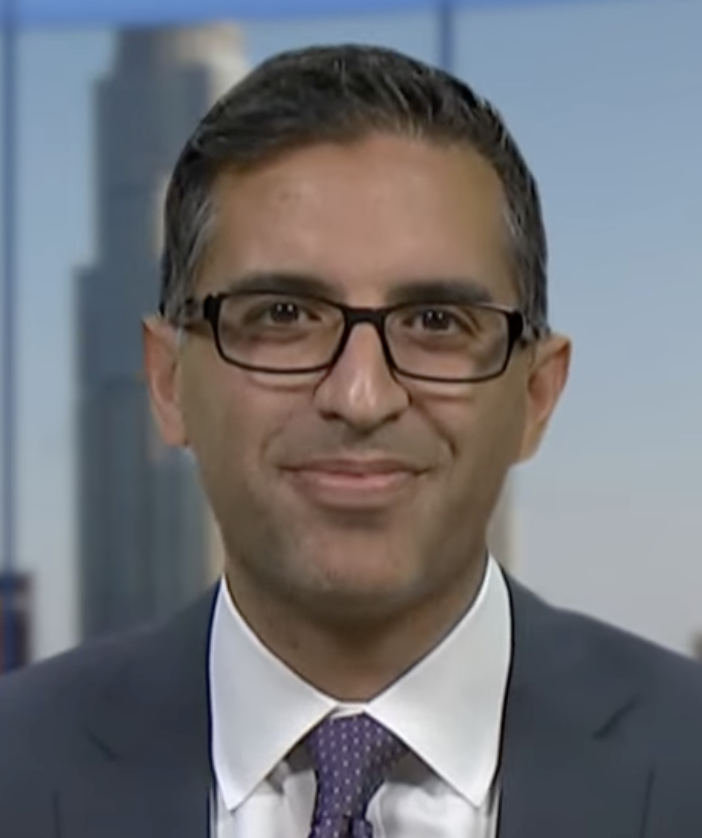

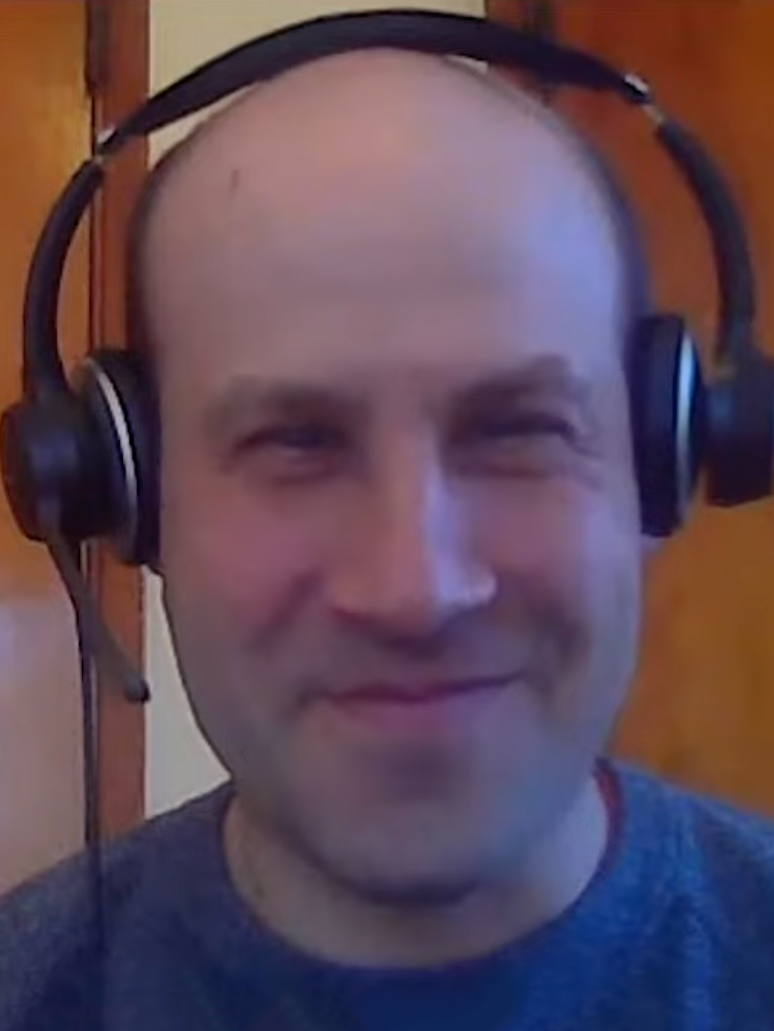
Candidate	Katy Yaroslavsky	Sam Yebri
First round	28,039; 48.97%	16,998; 29.68%
Runoff	50,391; 59.69%	34,028; 40.31%
Candidate	Jimmy Biblarz	Scott Epstein
First round	6,268; 10.95%	5,954; 10.40%
Runoff	Eliminated	Eliminated
Councilmember before election
Paul Koretz
Elected Councilmember
Katy Yaroslavsky

==== Candidates ====
===== Declared =====
- Jimmy Biblarz, attorney, faculty at UCLA School of Law, union member and activist
- Scott Epstein, social sciences researcher
- Katy Yaroslavsky, deputy for Los Angeles County Supervisor Sheila Kuehl
- Sam Yebri, community leader, attorney, and former city commissioner

===== Did not make ballot =====
- Daniel Bahr
- Molly Basler, owner of Inside Out Fitness/Wellness
- Dory Frank
- Kristina Irwin, real estate agent
- Josh Nadel

===== Withdrew =====
- Jeff Ebenstein, director of policy for Paul Koretz
- Janessa LaVoice

==== Endorsements ====
Jimmy Biblarz

Organizations

- Equality California
- LGBTQ Victory Fund
Scott Epstein

Organizations

- Bruin Democrats
Katy Yaroslavsky

U.S. representatives

- Karen Bass, U.S. representative for California's 37th district

State assemblymembers

- Isaac Bryan, state assemblymember for the 54th district

City councilmembers

- Rosalind Wiener Wyman, former Los Angeles City Council member for the 5th district

Los Angeles County officials

- Sheila Kuehl, member of the Los Angeles County Board of Supervisors
- Zev Yaroslavsky, former member of the Los Angeles County Board of Supervisors; Yaroslavsky's father-in-law

Labor unions

- Los Angeles County Federation of Labor

Organizations

- Los Angeles League of Conservation Voters
- Sierra Club

Newspapers and other media

- Los Angeles Times
Sam Yebri

U.S. representatives

- Henry Waxman, former U.S. representative

City councilmembers

- Joe Buscaino, member of the Los Angeles City Council for the 15th district

Mayors

- Antonio Villaraigosa, 41st mayor of Los Angeles

Los Angeles County officials

- Holly Mitchell, member of the Los Angeles County Board of Supervisors

Organizations

- Los Angeles Area Chamber of Commerce

==== Results ====
2022 Los Angeles City Council District 5 election
Primary election
Candidate	Votes	%
Katy Yaroslavsky	28,039	48.97%
Sam Yebri	16,998	29.68%
Jimmy Biblarz	6,268	10.95%
Scott Epstein	5,954	10.40%
Total votes	57,259	100.00%
General election
Katy Yaroslavsky	50,391	59.69%
Sam Yebri	34,028	40.31%
Total votes	84,419	100.00%

=== District 7 ===
Los Angeles City Council District 7 election
- June 7, 2022
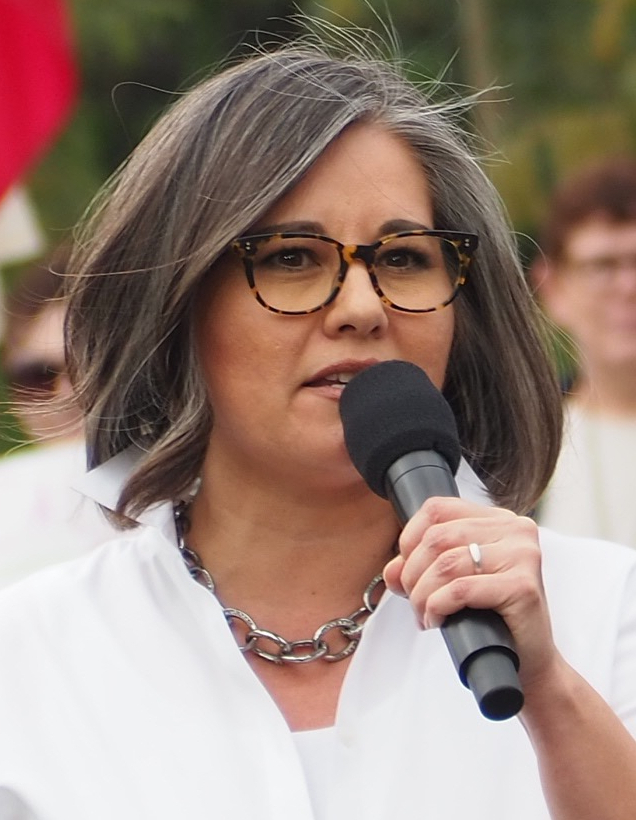

Candidate	Monica Rodriguez	Elisa Avalos
First round	20,267; 67.91%	9,577; 32.09%
Councilmember before election
Monica Rodriguez
Elected Councilmember
Monica Rodriguez

==== Candidates ====
===== Declared =====
- Elisa Avalos, community advocate
- Monica Rodriguez, incumbent councilmember

===== Did not make ballot =====
- Kevin Davis
- Reuben Garcia, volunteer public advocate
- Shirley Kim

==== Results ====
2022 Los Angeles City Council District 7 election
Primary election
Candidate	Votes	%
Monica Rodriguez (incumbent)	20,267	67.91
Elisa Avalos	9,577	32.09
Total votes	29,844	100.00

=== District 9 ===
Los Angeles City Council District 9 election
- June 7, 2022
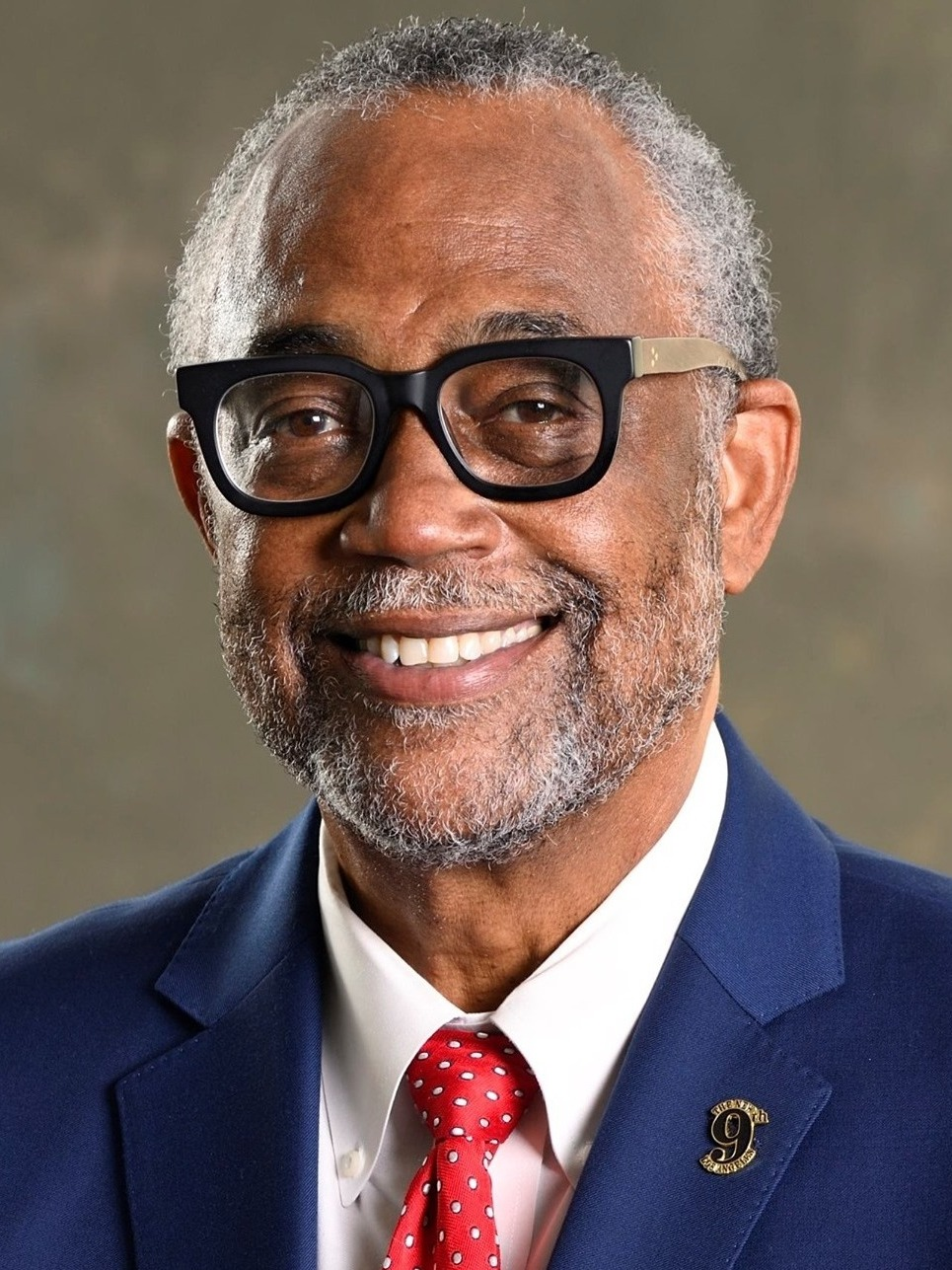

Candidate	Curren Price	Dulce Vasquez
First round	8,286; 62.14%	4,242; 32.66%
Councilmember before election
Curren Price
Elected Councilmember
Curren Price

==== Candidates ====
===== Declared =====
- Curren Price, incumbent councilmember
- Dulce Vasquez, college administrator at Arizona State University

===== Did not make ballot =====
- Adriana Cabrera
- David Cunningham
- Miguel I. Lemus

===== Withdrawn =====
- Nick Pacheco, former city councilor from the 14th district

==== Endorsements ====
Curren Price

U.S. senators

- Alex Padilla, U.S. senator for California

Mayors

- Eric Garcetti, 43rd mayor of Los Angeles
- Antonio Villaraigosa, 41st mayor of Los Angeles
Dulce Vasquez

U.S. representatives

- Katie Hill, former U.S. representative for California's 25th district

State senators

- Lena Gonzalez, state senator for the 33rd district

City controllers

- Laura Chick, 17th Los Angeles City Controller

Los Angeles County officials

- Gloria Molina, former member of the Los Angeles County Board of Supervisors

Newspapers and other media

- Los Angeles Times

Organizations

- Los Angeles Area Chamber of Commerce
- Run for Something

==== Results ====
2022 Los Angeles City Council District 9 election
Primary election
Candidate	Votes	%
Curren Price (incumbent)	8,286	62.14
Dulce Vasquez	4,242	32.66
Adriana Cabrera (write-in)	668	5.10
Miguel I. Lemus (write-in)	7	0.10
Total votes	13,203	100.00

=== District 11 ===
Los Angeles City Council District 11 election
- November 8, 2022
- Registered: 1,608,639
- Turnout: 28.58%
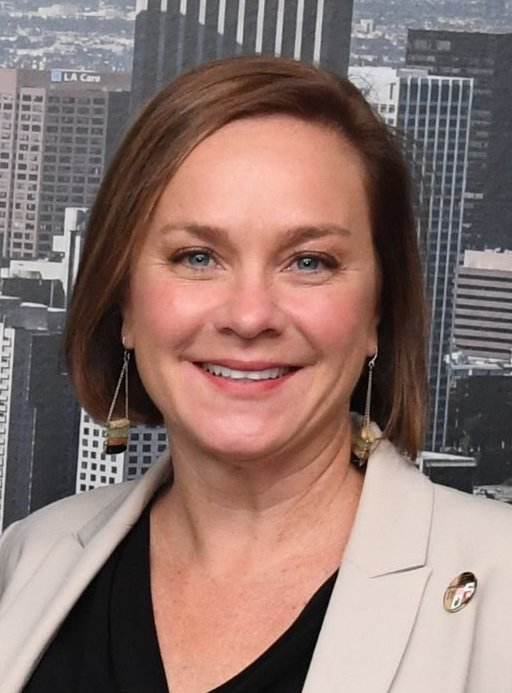

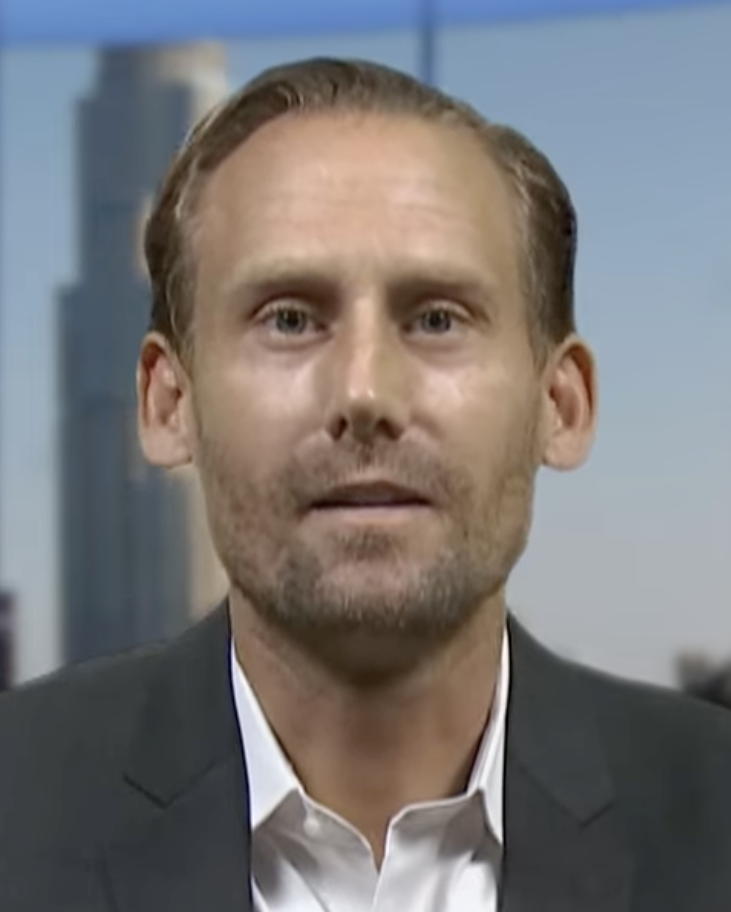

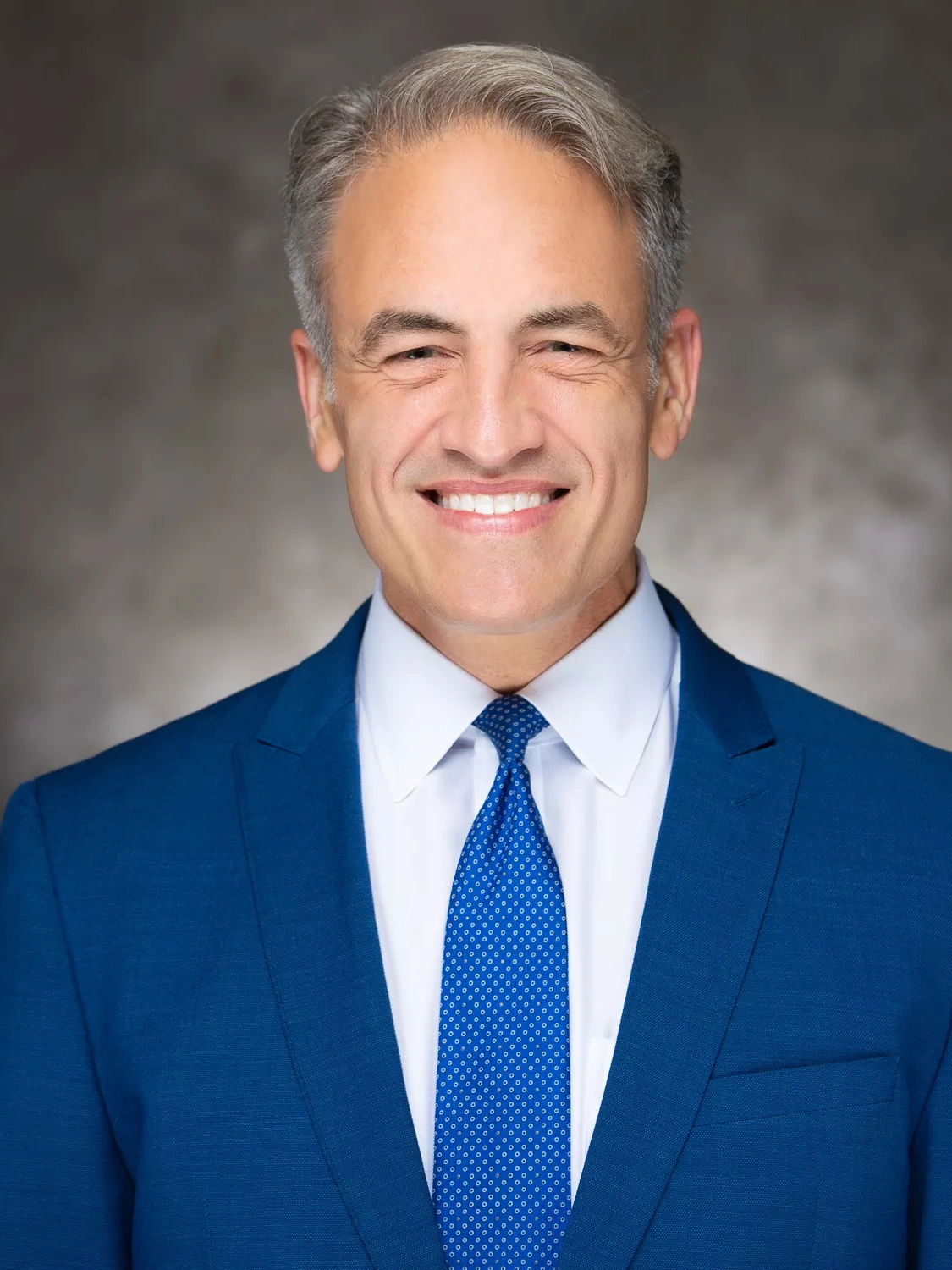
Candidate	Traci Park	Erin Darling	Greg Good
First round	19,168; 28.97%	22,939; 34.67%	6,565; 9.92%
Runoff	50,758; 52.06%	46,732; 47.94%	Eliminated
Candidate	Allison Holdorff Polhill	Michael Newhouse
First round	5,805; 8.77%	4,702; 7.11%
Runoff	Eliminated	Eliminated
Councilmember before election
Mike Bonin
Elected Councilmember
Traci Park

==== Candidates ====
===== Declared =====
- Erin Darling, civil rights lawyer
- Greg Good, Commissioner on the City of Los Angeles Board of Public Works
- Midsanon "Soni" Lloyd, public school teacher
- Jim Murez, Venice Neighborhood Council President
- Michael Newhouse, president of the Venice Neighborhood Council
- Traci Park, attorney
- Allison Holdorff Polhill, chief advisor to LAUSD board member Nick Melvoin
- Matthew Smith, U.S. Army veteran

===== Did not make ballot =====
- Christopher Baker, international trade adviser
- Gary Copeland, photographer
- Cristian Letelier, property manager
- Ronnie McCowan, community organizer
- Vincent Sulaitis, security guard

===== Withdrew =====
- Mike Bonin, incumbent councilmember
- Maryam Zar, city commissioner and founder of Womenfound

==== Endorsements ====
Erin Darling

State senators

- Ben Allen, state senator for the 26th district

State assemblymembers

- Isaac Bryan, state assemblymember for the 54th district
- Laura Friedman, state assemblymember for the 43rd district

Los Angeles County elected officials

- Sheila Kuehl, member of the Los Angeles County Board of Supervisors

City councilmembers

- Mike Bonin, member of the Los Angeles City Council for the 11th district
- Eunisses Hernandez, member-elect of the Los Angeles City Council for the 1st district

Individuals

- Dolores Huerta, labor leader

Organizations

- California Working Families Party
- Los Angeles County Democratic Party (previously endorsed Good)

Newspapers and other media

- Los Angeles Times
Greg Good

Labor unions

- Los Angeles County Federation of Labor
- United Teachers Los Angeles

Organizations

- ~~Los Angeles County Democratic Party~~ (swithced endorsement to Darling after Good was eliminated)
- Los Angeles League of Conservation Voters
Traci Park

Statewide elected officials

- Fiona Ma, 34th Treasurer of California

Mayors

- Pam O'Connor, former mayor of Santa Monica, California
- Antonio Villaraigosa, 41st mayor of Los Angeles

City controllers

- Ron Galperin, 19th City Controller of Los Angeles

Labor unions

- Los Angeles Airport Peace Officers Association
- Los Angeles Police Protective League

==== Results ====
2022 Los Angeles City Council District 11 election
Primary election
Candidate	Votes	%
Erin Darling	22,939	34.67%
Traci Park	19,168	28.97%
Greg Good	6,565	9.92%
Allison Holdorff Polhill	5,805	8.77%
Michael Newhouse	4,702	7.11%
Jim Murez	3,286	4.97%
Matthew Smith	2,590	3.91%
Midsanon "Soni" Lloyd	1,116	1.69%
Total votes	66,171	100.00%
General election
Traci Park	50,758	52.06%
Erin Darling	46,732	47.94%
Total votes	97,490	100.00%

=== District 13 ===
Los Angeles City Council District 13 election
- November 8, 2022
- Registered: 1,608,639
- Turnout: 28.58%
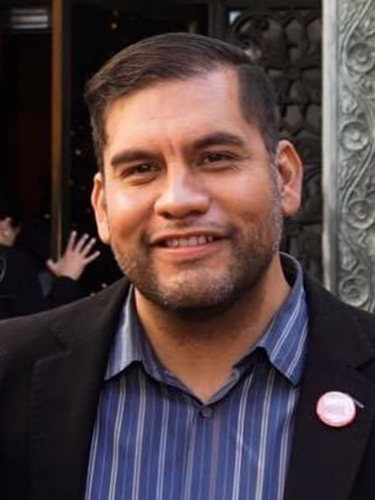

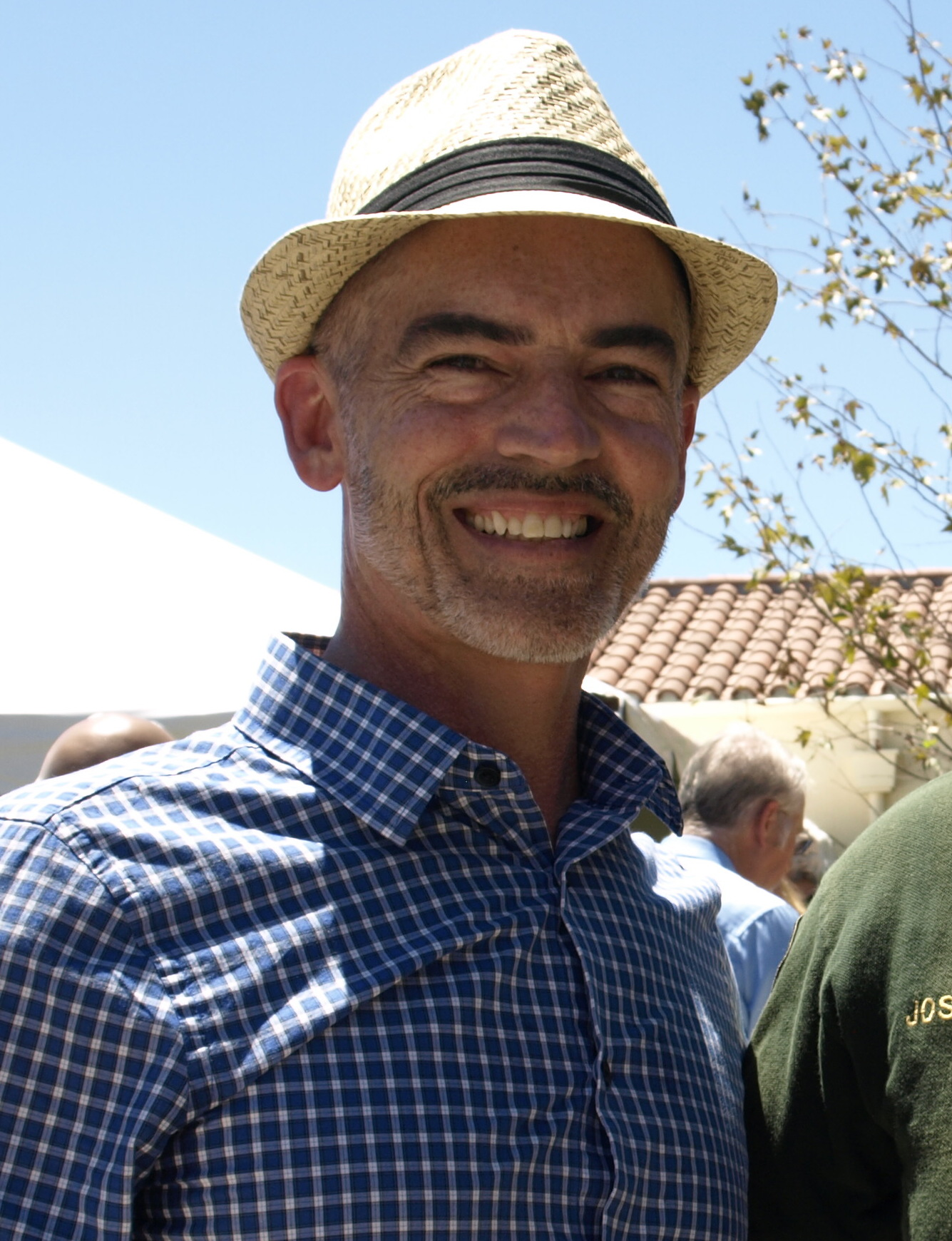
Candidate	Hugo Soto-Martinez	Mitch O'Farrell
First round	19,196; 40.63%	14,952; 31.65%
Runoff	37,800; 57.74%	27,663; 42.26%
Candidate	Kate Pynoos	Stephen Johnson
First round	7,371; 15.60%	3,648; 7.72%
Runoff	Eliminated	Eliminated
Councilmember before election
Mitch O'Farrell
Elected Councilmember
Hugo Soto-Martinez

==== Candidates ====
===== Declared =====
- Albert Corado, community organizer
- Stephen Johnson, Los Angeles County Deputy Sheriff
- Mitch O'Farrell, incumbent councilmember
- Kate Pynoos, former homelessness policy adviser to Councilman Mike Bonin
- Hugo Soto-Martinez, labor organizer

===== Did not make ballot =====
- Carlos H. Flowers, self-identified defense sales representative
- Dylan Kendall, designer and founder of Hollywood Arts
- Rachael Rose Luckey, transgender housing rights advocate and Rampart Village Neighborhood Council President

===== Withdrew =====
- Mary Hellman, real estate agent
- Clarendon K. "Clay" Johnston, community activist
- Chad Michael Manuel, adjudicator

==== Endorsements ====
Albert Corado

Individuals

- Melina Abdullah, academic and co-founder of Black Lives Matter Los Angeles
- Maebe A. Girl, Silver Lake Neighborhood Councilmember and drag queen
Mitch O'Farrell

U.S. senators

- Alex Padilla, U.S. senator for California

U.S. representatives

- Adam Schiff, U.S. representative for California's 28th congressional district

State senators

- Ben Allen, state senator for 26th district

State assemblymembers

- Richard Bloom, state assemblyman for the 50th Assembly district
- Wendy Carrillo, state assemblywoman for the 51st Assembly district
- Mike Fong, state assemblyman for the 49th Assembly district
- Laura Friedman, state assemblywoman for the 43rd Assembly district
- Mike Gipson, state assemblyman for the 64th Assembly district
- Adrin Nazarian, state assemblyman for the 46th Assembly district
- Miguel Santiago, state assemblyman for the 53rd Assembly district

City councilmembers

- Bob Blumenfield, member of the Los Angeles City Council for the 3rd district
- Gil Cedillo, member of the Los Angeles City Council for the 1st district
- Paul Krekorian, member of the Los Angeles City Council for the 2nd district
- Nury Martinez, President of the Los Angeles City Council
- Curren Price, member of the Los Angeles City Council for the 9th district

Los Angeles County officials

- Hilda Solis, member of the Los Angeles County Board of Supervisors for the 1st district

Labor unions

- International Alliance of Theatrical Stage Employees

Organizations

- Los Angeles County Democratic Party
- Equality California
- Hollywood Chamber of Commerce
- Los Angeles League of Conservation Voters
- Planned Parenthood Advocacy Project Los Angeles County Action Fund
- Sierra Club
- Stonewall Democrats
Kate Pynoos

U.S. representatives

- Katie Hill, former U.S. representative for California's 25th district

City councilmembers

- Mike Bonin, member of the Los Angeles City Council for the 11th district (joint endorsement with Hugo Soto-Martinez)
Hugo Soto-Martinez

State senators

- María Elena Durazo, state senator for 24th district

City councilmembers

- Mike Bonin, member of the Los Angeles City Council for the 11th district (joint endorsement with Kate Pynoos)
- Jackie Goldberg, former member of the Los Angeles City Council for the 13th district
- Nithya Raman, member of the Los Angeles City Council for the 4th district

Individuals

- Cleve Jones, AIDS and LGBT activist
- James Lawson, activist and university professor

Labor unions

- National Union of Healthcare Workers
- United Teachers Los Angeles

Organizations

- California Working Families Party
- Center for Biological Diversity
- Democratic Socialists of America
- Our Revolution
- Run for Something
- Sunrise Movement

==== Results ====
2022 Los Angeles City Council District 13 election
Primary election
Candidate	Votes	%
Hugo Soto-Martinez	19,196	40.63%
Mitch O'Farrell (incumbent)	14,952	31.65%
Kate Pynoos	7,371	15.60%
Stephen Johnson	3,648	7.72%
Albert Corado	2,081	4.40%
Total votes	47,248	100.00%
General election
Hugo Soto-Martinez	37,800	57.74%
Mitch O'Farrell (incumbent)	27,663	42.26%
Total votes	65,463	100.00%

=== District 15 ===
Los Angeles City Council District 15 election
- November 8, 2022
- Registered: 1,608,639
- Turnout: 28.58%
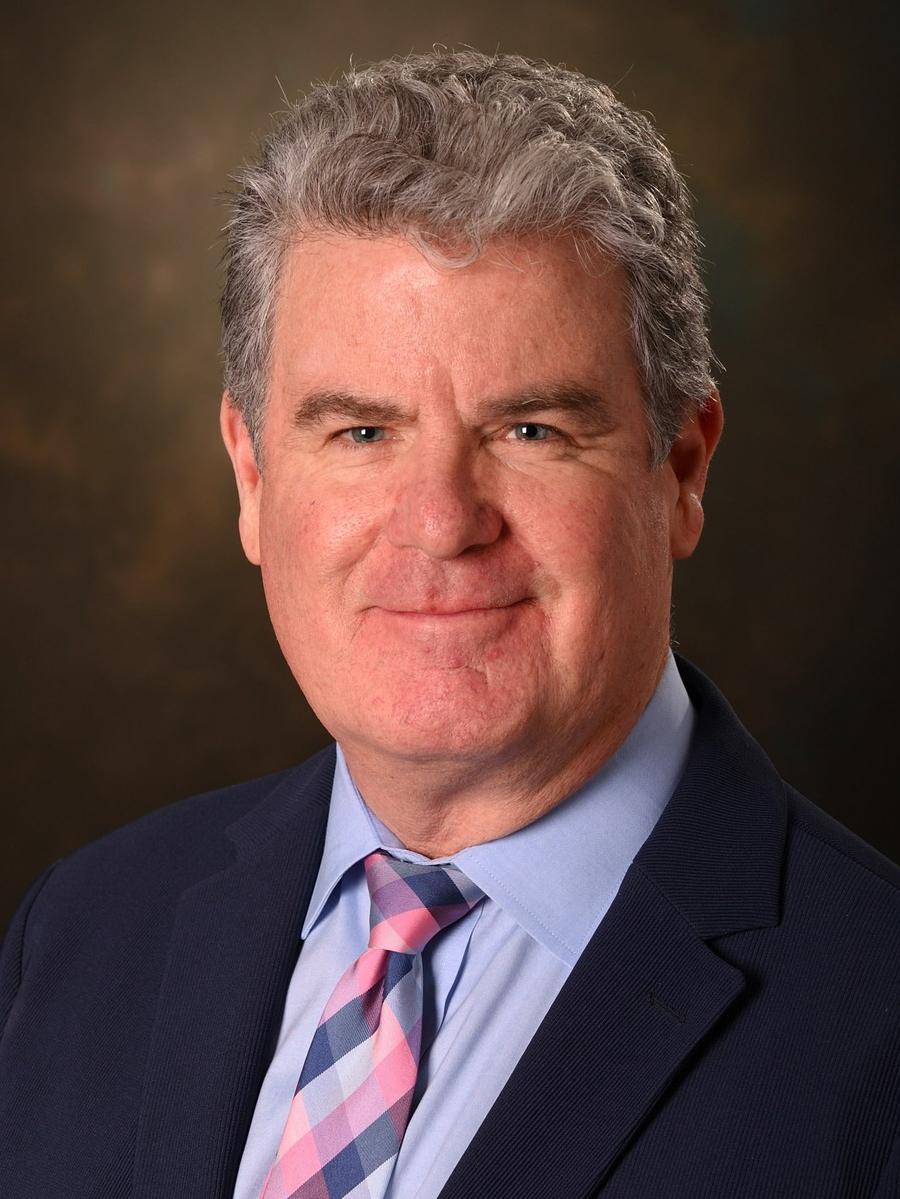

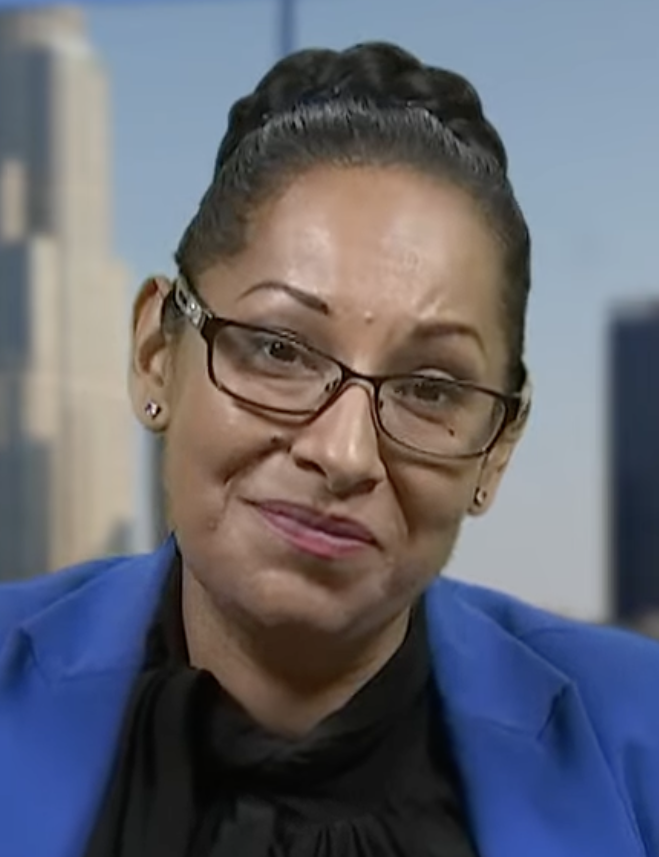
Candidate	Tim McOsker	Danielle Sandoval
First round	9,891; 37.69%	7,704; 29.36%
Runoff	26,022; 64.28%	14,458; 35.72%
Candidate	Anthony Santich	Bryant Odega
First round	4,512; 17.19%	4,137; 15.76%
Runoff	Eliminated	Eliminated
Councilmember before election
Joe Buscaino
Elected Councilmember
Tim McOsker

==== Candidates ====
===== Declared =====
- Tim McOsker, former chief of staff to James Hahn and police union lobbyist
- Bryant Odega, teacher, community organizer for climate justice, and a former member of the Harbor Gateway Neighborhood Council
- Danielle Sandoval, businesswoman
- Anthony D. Santich, business professional

===== Did not make ballot =====
- Andrew M. Bak-Boychuk, educator
- Mark Contreras, youth and senior advocate
- Pati Lawrence, marketing consultant
- Robert M. Miller, artist and environmental activist
- Shannon Ross, neighborhood council member
- Rick Thomas, citizen advocate

===== Withdrew =====
- Christian L. Guzman, environmentalist
- LaMar Lyons, administrator for nonprofits

==== Endorsements ====
Tim McOsker

U.S. senators

- Alex Padilla, U.S. senator for California

U.S. representatives

- Nanette Barragán, U.S. representative for California's 44th district
- Tony Cárdenas, U.S. representative for the California's 29th district
- Jimmy Gomez, U.S. representative for California's 34th district
- Ted Lieu, U.S. representative for California's 33rd district
- Alan Lowenthal, U.S. representative for California's 47th district
- Maxine Waters, U.S. representative for California's 43rd district

Statewide elected officials

- Ricardo Lara, 8th California Insurance Commissioner

Mayors

- Eric Garcetti, 42nd mayor of Los Angeles
- Robert Garcia, 28th mayor of Long Beach

State senators

- Steven Bradford, state senator for the 35th district
- María Elena Durazo, state senator for the 24th district
- Sydney Kamlager, state senator for the 30th district

State assemblymembers

- Mike Fong, state assemblymember for the 49th district
- Warren Furutani, former state assemblymember for the 55th Assembly district
- Mike Gipson, state assemblymember for the 64th Assembly district
- Reggie Jones-Sawyer, state assemblymember for the 59th Assembly district
- Al Muratsuchi, state assemblymember for the 66th Assembly district
- Patrick O'Donnell, state assemblymember for the 70th district
- Anthony Rendon, 70th Speaker of the California State Assembly
- Miguel Santiago, state assemblymember for the 53rd district

Los Angeles County officials

- Sheila Kuehl, member of the Los Angeles County Board of Supervisors from the 4th District

Newspapers and other media

- Los Angeles Times
- La Opinión
Danielle Sandoval

Organizations

- United Teachers Los Angeles

Newspapers and other media

- ~~Los Angeles Times~~ (withdrew after primary)
Bryant Odega

Organizations

- Center for Biological Diversity
- Communities for a Better Environment
- Run for Something
- Sunrise Movement

==== Results ====
2022 Los Angeles City Council District 15 election
Primary election
Candidate	Votes	%
Tim McOsker	9,891	37.69
Danielle Sandoval	7,704	29.36
Anthony D. Santich	4,512	17.19
Bryant Odega	4,137	15.76
Total votes	26,244	100.00
General election
Tim McOsker	26,022	64.28%
Danielle Sandoval	14,458	35.72%
Total votes	40,480	100.00%

== LAUSD Board of Education ==
=== District 2 ===
==== Candidates ====
===== Declared =====
- Maria Brenes, leader of InnerCity Struggle
- Rocio Rivas, political activist
- Miguel Angel Segura, public school teacher
- Erica Vilardi-Espinosa, member of the Los Feliz Neighborhood Council

==== Withdrew ====
- Raquel Zamora

===== Did not make ballot =====
- Jerell Benjamin Johnson
- Miho Murai, attorney
- Erika Ochoa

===== Endorsements =====
Rocio Rivas

U.S. representatives

- Jimmy Gomez, U.S. representative for California's 34th district
- Lucille Roybal-Allard, U.S. representative for California's 40th district

Los Angeles County elected officials

- Hilda Solis, member of the Los Angeles County Board of Supervisors

Labor unions

- United Teachers Los Angeles

Organizations

- Democratic Socialists of America
Maria Brenes

Newspapers and other media

- Los Angeles Times

===== Results =====
2022 LAUSD Board of Education District 2 election
Primary election
Candidate	Votes	%
Rocio Rivas	33,272	44.17
Maria Brenes	22,938	30.45
Miguel Angel Segura	13,289	17.64
Erica Vilardi-Espinosa	5,823	7.73
Miho Murai (write-in)	23	0.01
Total votes	75,345	100.00
General election
Rocio Rivas	55,230	52.49
Maria Brenes	49,985	47.51
Total votes	105,215	100.00

=== District 4 ===
==== Candidates ====
===== Declared =====
- Gentille Barkhordarian, electrical engineer
- Nick Melvoin, incumbent board member
- Tracey Schroeder, elementary school teacher

===== Did not make ballot =====
- Raissa White
- Kellie N. Williams

===== Withdrew =====
- Midsanon "Soni" Lloyd, public school teacher
- Negar Nikgohar

===== Endorsements =====
Nick Melvoin

Mayors

- Eric Garcetti, 45th mayor of Los Angeles

City councilmembers

- Bob Blumenfield, member of the Los Angeles City Council for the 3rd district

Labor unions

- Service Employees International Union

Newspapers and other media

- Los Angeles Daily News
- Los Angeles Times

==== Results ====
2022 LAUSD Board of Education District 4 election
Primary election
Candidate	Votes	%
Nick Melvoin (incumbent)	82,696	59.81
Tracey Schroeder	36,377	26.31
Gentille Barkhordarian	19,200	13.89
Total votes	138,273	100.00

=== District 6 ===
==== Candidates ====
===== Declared =====
- Jesus Arana, police sergeant and educator
- Kelly Gonez, incumbent board member
- Marvin Rodriguez, Spanish teacher and veteran

===== Did not make ballot =====
- Jesie Balbuena
- Benito B. Bernal

===== Endorsements =====
Kelly Gonez

Labor unions

- United Teachers Los Angeles

Newspapers and other media

- Los Angeles Daily News
- Los Angeles Times

==== Results ====
2022 LAUSD Board of Education District 6 election
Primary election
Candidate	Votes	%
Kelly Gonez (incumbent)	32,702	47.72
Marvin Rodriguez	21,495	31.37
Jesus Arana	14,334	20.92
Total votes	68,531	100.00
General election
Kelly Gonez (incumbent)	51,707	51.27
Marvin Rodriguez	49,151	48.73
Total votes	100,858	100.00

== Ballot measures ==
=== Measure BB ===
Competitive Bid Preference for Local Contract Bidders
Choice	Votes	%
For	373,956	67.67
Against	178,665	32.33
Total	552,621	100.00
