= VICA =

Vica or VICA may refer to:

- SkillsUSA, a career and technical student organization originally known as the Vocational Industrial Clubs of America
- Valley Industry & Commerce Association, in the San Fernando Valley in metropolitan Los Angeles
- Vica (born 1961), former Brazilian football player and manager

== Places ==
- Viča (disambiguation), a Serbo-Croatian toponym
- Vića, a village in Sarajevo, Bosnia and Herzegovina
- Vica River, a river of Romania
- Vica, a village in Gurasada, Hunedoara County, Romania
