= Ron Herrera =

American labor leader

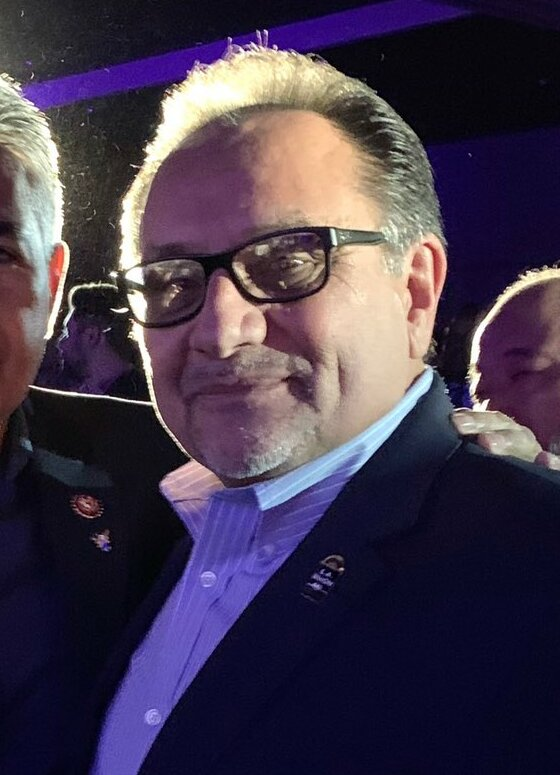
Ron Herrera, 2020

Ron Herrera is an American labor leader, who served as the President of the Los Angeles County Federation of Labor (colloquially called the "Fed") until his resignation on October 10, 2022, following the disclosure of his presence during a conversation where racist comments were made regarding black & indigenous peoples. Herrera also served as the Secretary-Treasurer of his home union, Teamsters Local 396, until his resignation on October 10, 2022; he had become a Teamsters member there in 1975 while working as a United Parcel Service package driver.

== 2022 Los Angeles City Council controversy ==
In October 2022, Herrera was implicated in the 2022 Los Angeles City Council controversy after being part of a conversation wherein City Council President Nury Martinez made racist remarks about the adopted Black son of City Council member Mike Bonin, among others. In the same conversation, Herrera was recorded saying "my goal is to get the three of you elected, and I'm just focused on that," referring to Martinez and City Council members Kevin de León and Gil Cedillo, who were also present during the conversation.

As a result of the fallout from the controversy, separate audio recordings of a conversation between Herrera and former Mitch O'Farrell (and later Fed) staffer Hannah Cho reveal a plot to "buy" the endorsements of several progressive non-profits and Democratic clubs — including the LA County Young Democrats and Stonewall Democratic Club (which Cho refers to as "the LGBT one") — in an effort to keep O'Farrell in office and challenger Hugo Soto-Martinez out. In response, Alex Mohajer, president of the Stonewall Democrats, proclaimed that the club is "not for sale."

Herrera resigned on October 10 after facing widespread calls to resign, including from the leaders of eight SEIU California unions with Los Angeles-area members, United Teachers Los Angeles, Unite Here Local 11 and the California Nurses Association. Herrera's home local union, Teamsters Local 396, joined multiple Teamsters locals in calling for him to leave. The chair of the Los Angeles County Federation of Labor executive board, Thom Davis, saying, "The Executive Board of the Los Angeles County Federation of Labor also calls on those elected officials who were present to follow President Herrera's example by immediately resigning as well." Following his resignation, Herrera issued an apology for not speaking out against the "vile remarks made in that room."
