= 2022 Los Angeles City Council scandal =

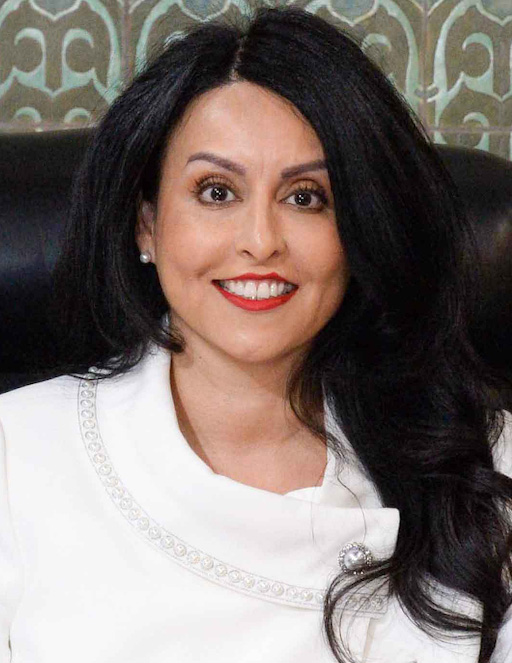
Nury Martinez

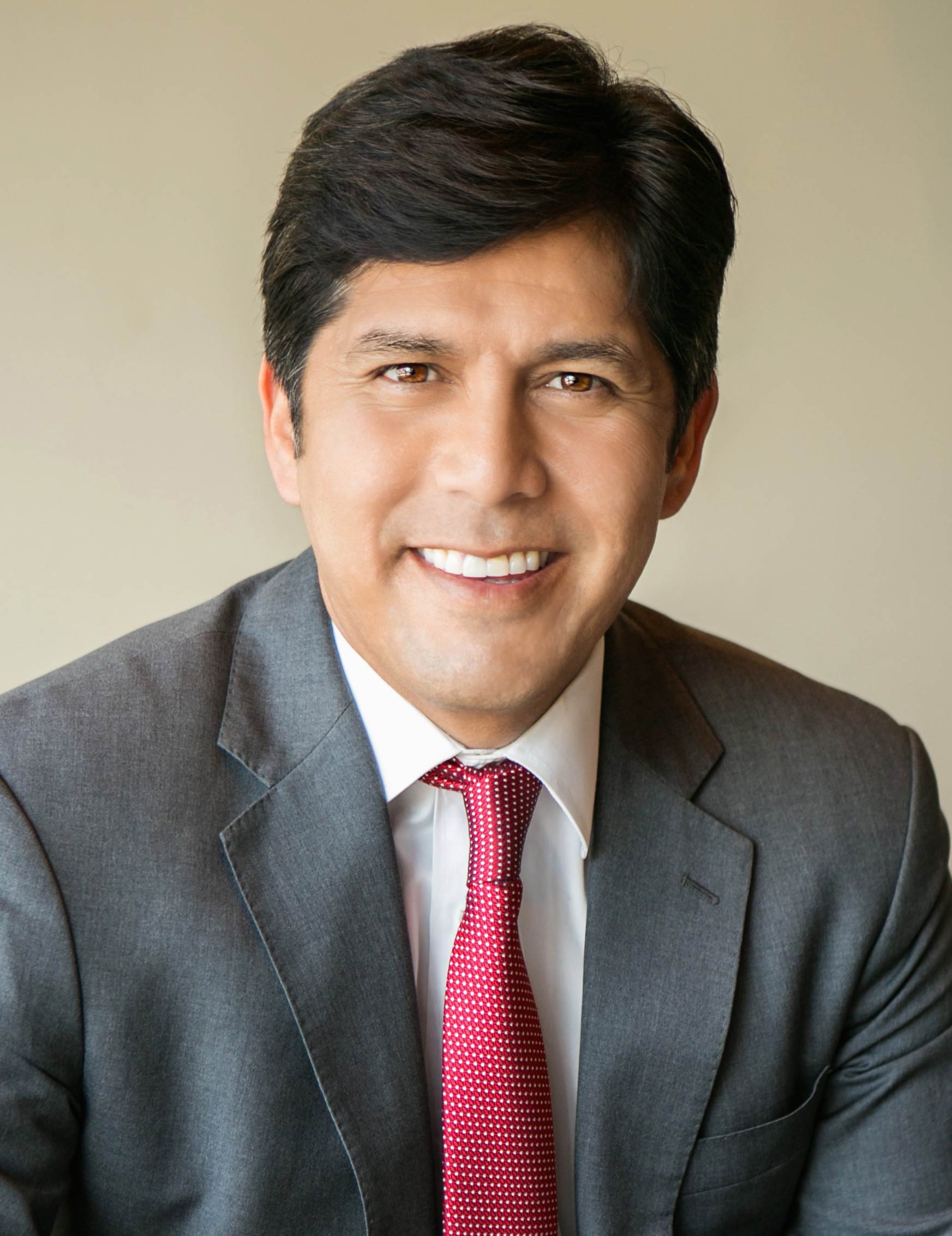
Kevin de León

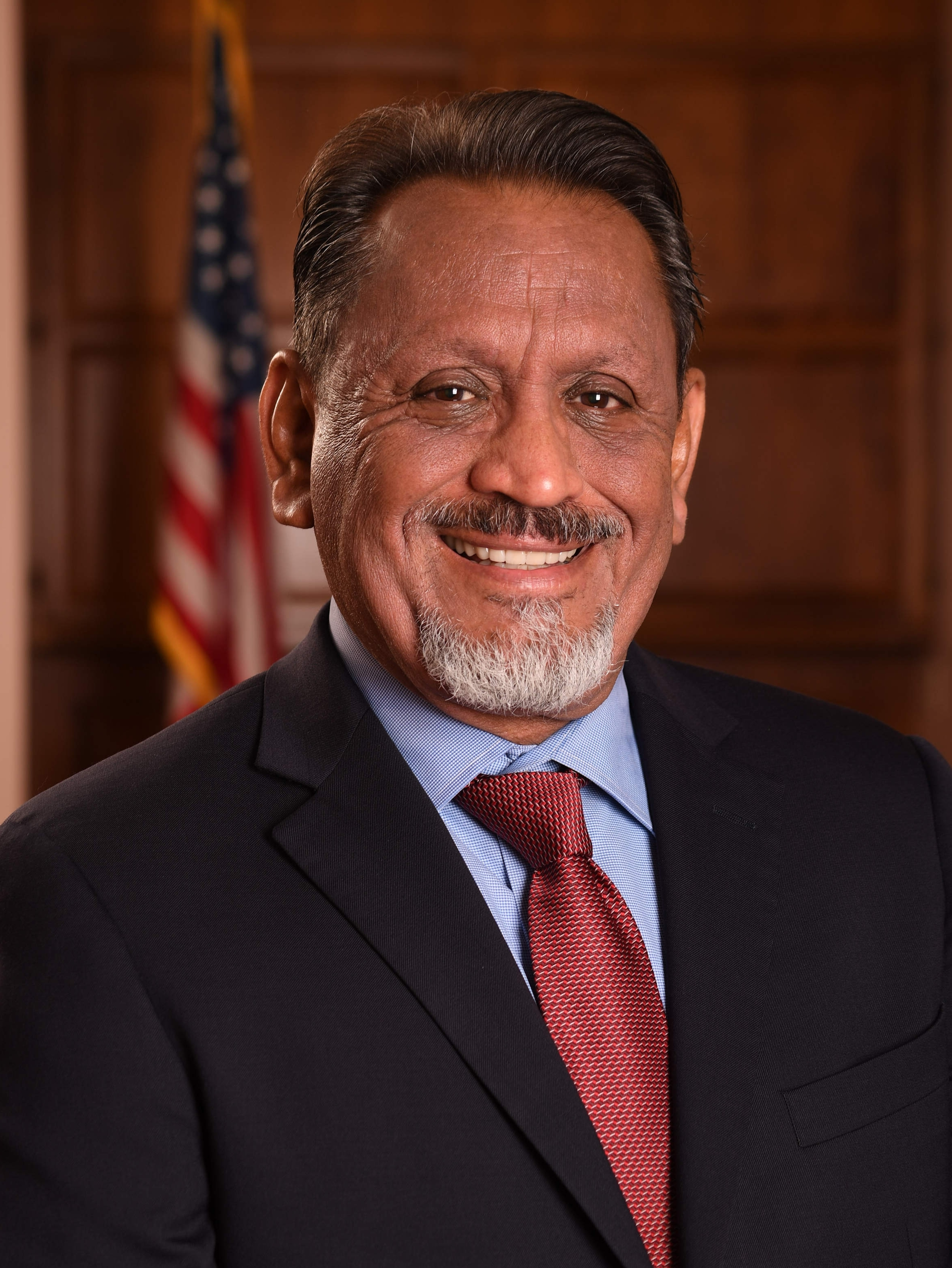
Gil Cedillo

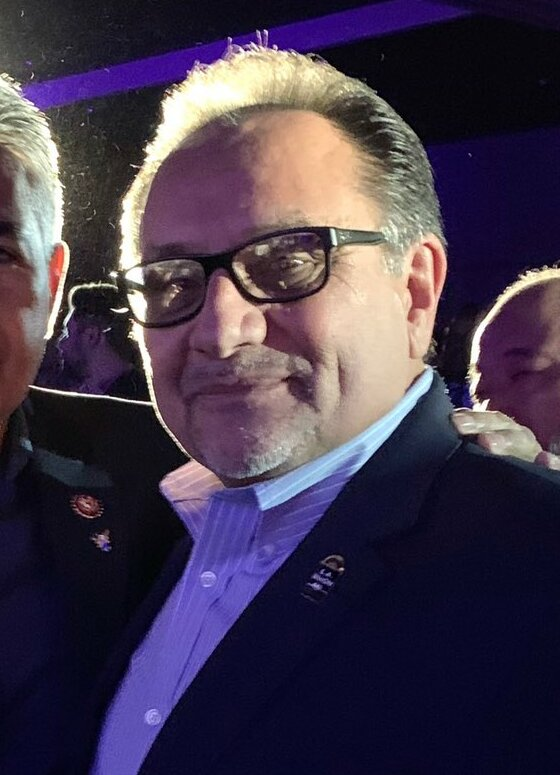
Ron Herrera

On October 9, 2022, an audio recording surfaced of a private meeting involving Los Angeles City Council members and a union leader that involved racist and disparaging comments and led to a local political scandal. The audio recording captured a conversation between City Council president Nury Martinez, fellow councilmembers Gil Cedillo and Kevin de León, and Los Angeles County Federation of Labor (colloquially referred to as the "Fed") President Ron Herrera.

The next day, on October 10, Martinez resigned her presidency position but remained in her city council seat, as did the other city council members, despite numerous prominent calls for them to step down. Since none were under indictment, they could only be removed from office by a voter-initiated recall. Herrera, however, resigned from his position the same day.

After mounting pressure, on October 12, Martinez announced her resignation from her elected seat in the City Council. Cedillo and de León did not step down despite numerous calls for their resignations. They were stripped of their committee assignments and chairmanships and were formally censured along with Martinez by the City Council in a unanimous 12–0 vote on October 26. Cedillo served out the remaining weeks of his term; de León lost reelection in 2024.

== Meeting ==
In a closed door meeting at the Los Angeles County Federation of Labor offices that lasted approximately one hour, Martinez, Cedillo, de León, and Herrera discussed specific councilmembers, redistricting, and how to "consolidate and preserve political power." The audio recording is believed to be from one year prior, roughly mid-October 2021, and was leaked anonymously onto Reddit on September 19, 2022.

=== Racist language ===
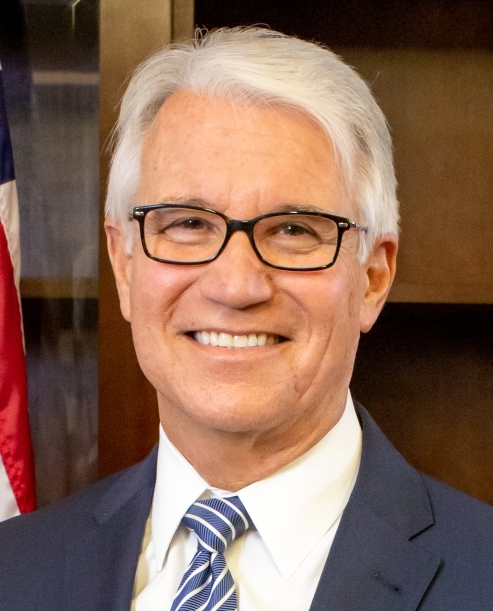
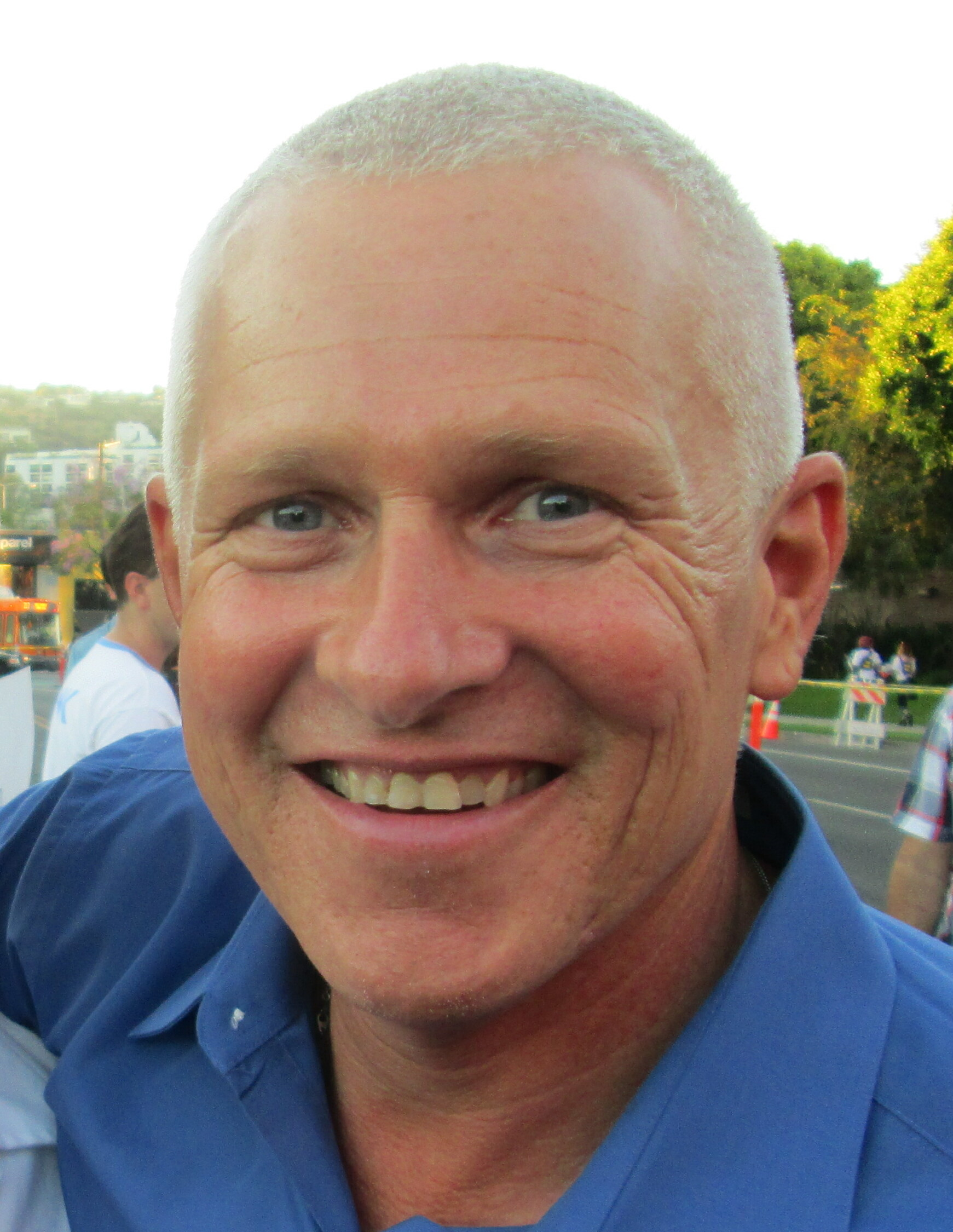
District Attorney George Gascón (left) and councilmember Mike Bonin (right) were targeted in the audio recording. Gascon, due to his perceived friendliness with black Angelenos, and Bonin, due to his adopted black son.

The audio recording of the meeting gained widespread attention due to the personal attacks, racist and colorist language, and discussion of political goals. The participants were discussing gerrymandering when Martinez stated, "Fuck that guy ... He's with the blacks", referring to District Attorney George Gascón.

Martinez also insulted fellow councilmember Mike Bonin's black adopted child. Referring to the behavior of the then-three-year-old child during a 2017 parade, she said, "They're raising him like a little white kid ... I was like, 'This kid needs a beatdown. Let me take him around the corner, I'll bring him right back.' " Martinez also stated of the child, "There is nothing you can do to control him, parece changuito," with the "parece changuito" meaning "(looks/acts) like a little monkey" in Spanish. She also called Bonin a "little bitch".

In the course of the discussion on redistricting, she commented, "I see a lot of little short dark people there." Cedillo replies, "Yeah! Puro Oaxacan. Puro Oaxacan [and] Korean Not even like Kevin, little ones." This was said in reference to Los Angeles’ Koreatown. She continued, "I was like, I don't know what village they came from, how they got here, but whatever." She can also be heard to remark, "tan feos" (Spanish for "[they're] ugly"). Oaxaca is a Mexican state that has a high percentage of Indigenous population, mostly of Zapotec origin, and Oaxacans are also represented in immigrant communities in Los Angeles.

The audio also revealed council members' remarks about Jews and Armenians, with Martinez saying "The judios cut their deal with South LA. That's how I see it. And they are gonna screw everyone else", and referred to Areen Ibranossian, an advisor to councillor Paul Krekorian, as "The guy with one eyebrow." Martinez wasn't able to recall the last name and Cedillo replied "It ends in i-a-n, I bet you."

=== Redistricting ===
The three councilmembers discussed how to appoint a new councilmember who would work in their interests, and also agreed to gerrymander Councilmember Nithya Raman's district in order to suppress those who had voted for her. Heather Hutt, a former California state director for then-Senator Kamala Harris, was suggested.

On August 26, 2022, Martinez introduced a motion to appoint Hutt as a councilmember, which was seconded by four other members. The motion was opposed by Marqueece Harris-Dawson and Mike Bonin, who instead proposed instructing the city attorney to find eligibility requirements for appointments. On August 30, the vote to instate Hutt as a councilmember fell one vote short, with five voting for and five voting against; it was referred to the Rules, Elections and Intergovernmental Relations Committee for further discussion. The committee cleared her for reconsideration by the council the next day, and Hutt was confirmed by the council in the next meeting and sworn in on September 2, 2022.

== Subsequent leaks ==
As a result of the fallout from the controversy, separate audio recordings of a conversation between Herrera and Hannah Cho, a former Mitch O'Farrell (and later LA County Federation of Labor) staffer, were leaked on October 15. They revealed a plot to "buy" the support of several progressive non-profits and Democratic clubs, including the LA County Young Democrats and Stonewall Democratic Club (which Cho refers to as "the LGBT one"), in an effort to help O'Farrell defeat his challenger Hugo Soto-Martinez in the November 2022 runoff election. In the recordings, Cho also disparages clubs backing Soto-Martínez — including the East Area Progressive Democrats and Democratic Socialists of America — by saying "they don't actually go outside" and "that's why they're so pale." O'Farrell was previously connected to the scandal after he was referred to as Martinez's "guy" by Cedillo and "my guy" by Herrera during recordings in which the four strategized on how to ensure an O'Farrell re-election over an unnamed opponent representing "Housing Related Entities (HREs)."

In response, Alex Mohajer, president of the Stonewall Democrats, proclaimed that the club is "not for sale" and accused Cho of working to decide the endorsements of the organization by being placed in their endorsement panels. Soto-Martínez called for O'Farrell to step down as acting council president while elections for the position were proceeding. He refused to do so, and served as acting president until Paul Krekorian was elected as the new council president. Soto-Martínez went on to defeat O'Farrell by ten points in the runoff election.

== Reactions ==
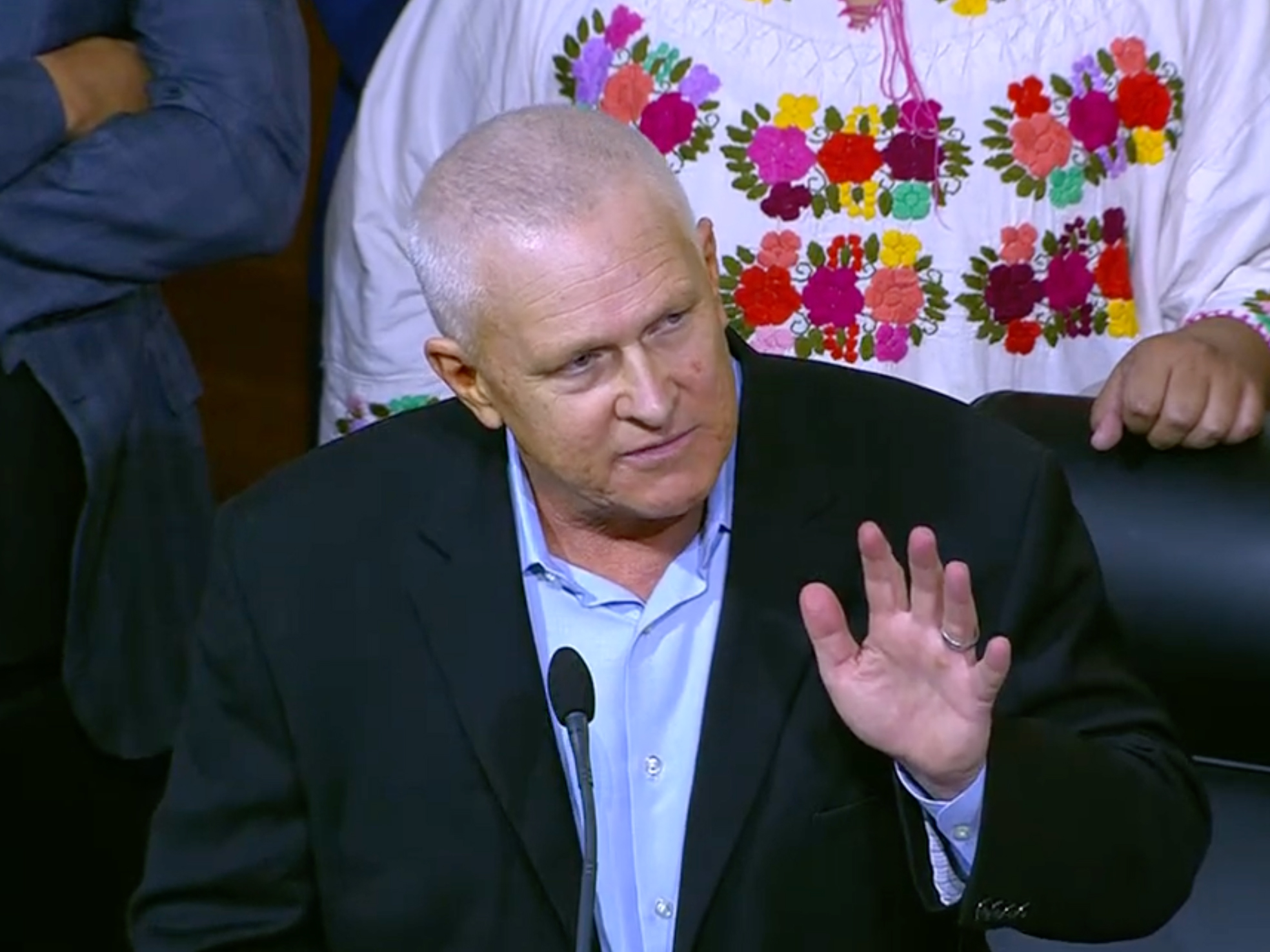
Bonin speaks to the City Council about the audio recording.

The editorial board of the Los Angeles Times called on all three politicians to resign in an op-ed article published October 10, 2022.

Los Angeles Council District 11 candidate Traci Park rejected the endorsements of Martinez and Cedillo, which had been given before the release of the recording.

Miriham Antonio, a community advocate and law student, wrote an op-ed piece for the LA Times discussing the "racism and colorism my vibrant Oaxacan community endures."

A number of prominent politicians called for all three councilmembers to resign, including Los Angeles Mayor Eric Garcetti, former Mayor Antonio Villaraigosa, U.S. Senator Alex Padilla (D-Calif.), and U.S. Representatives Adam Schiff (D-Burbank), Tony Cárdenas (D-Pacoima) and Jimmy Gomez (D-Los Angeles). Additionally, both candidates for Los Angeles mayor in the runoff election – U.S. Representative Karen Bass (D-Los Angeles) and developer Rick Caruso – as well as the Los Angeles County Democratic Party called for the councilmembers' resignations.

The California/Hawaii and Los Angeles NAACP, the Armenian National Committee of America and the SAG-AFTRA union called for the resignation of all four individuals involved.

On October 11, President Joe Biden called on all three councilmembers to resign from the council. Press secretary Karine Jean-Pierre stated, "The President is glad to see that one of the participants in that conversation has resigned, but they all should." Martinez resigned as president of the city council and announced that she would take a leave of absence; however, she had not resigned from her city council seat at that time, an action she would take on October 12.

On October 23, after Martinez had already resigned, California governor Gavin Newsom called on Cedillo and de León to step down.

=== City council protest ===
Two days after the audio's release, on Tuesday, October 11, a crowd of protestors disrupted the scheduled city council meeting, demanding Gil Cedillo and Kevin de León leave the room. Bonin gave a speech saying, "My husband and I are both raw and angry and heartbroken, and sick for our family and for Los Angeles.... Public officials are supposed to call us to our highest selves. These people stabbed us and shot us and cut the spirit of Los Angeles."

Since Martinez was not indicted for a crime, she could not be removed by a vote of the city council, and only a voter-initiated recall could remove her from office before her term would have normally ended in 2024.

== Aftermath ==
=== Nury Martinez ===
Martinez provided a statement in the Los Angeles Times apologizing, "In a moment of intense frustration and anger, I let the situation get the best of me. I hold myself accountable for these comments. For that I am sorry." Bonin's family replied in a tweet condemning the racist comments and demanding Martinez's resignation.

On October 9, protesters demonstrated outside of her home in the Sun Valley neighborhood of Los Angeles calling for her resignation.

On October 10, Martinez stepped down as president through a released statement that apologized to Bonin and others, saying, "Therefore, effective immediately I am resigning as President of the Los Angeles City Council," though she did not resign from her seat on the City Council. Councilman Mitch O'Farrell stepped in as acting president. Paul Krekorian was later elected as the new council president.

One day after stepping down as council president, Martinez announced she would be taking a leave of absence. In a statement, she said, "At this moment, I need to take a leave of absence and take some time to have an honest and heartfelt conversation with my family, my constituents, and community leaders. I am so sorry to the residents of Council District 6, my colleagues, and the City of Los Angeles." On October 12, she announced her resignation from the city council.

==== Replacement ====
A special election was held for Martinez's seat on April 4, 2023, with a runoff on June 27, 2023. Imelda Padilla won the runoff election against Marisa Alcaraz, and will serve out the remainder of Martinez's term, which expires in 2024.

=== Ron Herrera ===
After the release of the audio, Herrera faced calls to step down from across the labor movement, including the leaders of eight SEIU California unions with Los Angeles-area members, United Teachers Los Angeles, Unite Here Local 11 and the California Nurses Association. Herrera's home local union, Teamsters Local 396, joined multiple Teamsters locals in calling for him to leave.

He resigned from the Los Angeles County Federation of Labor on the evening of October 10; the chair of the federation's executive board, Thom Davis, said, "The Executive Board of the Los Angeles County Federation of Labor also calls on those elected officials who were present to follow President Herrera's example by immediately resigning as well."

=== Kevin de León ===
De León offered a statement of apology but did not offer to step down from his position. "I regret appearing to condone and even contribute to certain insensitive comments made about a colleague and his family in private... I've reached out to that colleague personally." On October 20, 2022, de León said he would not resign and that he planned to serve out the remainder of his term. He claimed to have apologized "profusely" to Bonin, but Bonin did not accept his apology and demanded via Twitter that de León resign.

On October 27, 2022, a recall effort against De León was accepted by the Los Angeles City Clerk's office. However, the recall campaign failed to acquire the required 20,437 signatures by the deadline—and as a result, no recall referendum was held.

In December 2022, de León became involved in an altercation with protestors at a community event. Video of the incident was captured and subsequently released, showing that the physical altercation started when a community activist blocked de León while the latter attempted to exit the building, and ending with de Leon's hands near the activist's neck.

On September 20, 2023, de León announced that he would run for re-election in the 2024 race. He faced numerous challengers who have criticized his remarks in the leaked audio. He was later defeated in his reelection in 2024 by Ysabel Jurado.

=== Gil Cedillo ===
When the audio leaked in October 2022, Cedillo was already a lame duck; he had lost reelection to activist Eunisses Hernandez on June 7 and his term was set to expire in December. Council president Paul Krekorian suggested that if Cedillo resigned before the end of his term, the council could seat Hernandez immediately. Cedillo evaded questions about whether or not he would resign. On October 19, a spokesman for Cedillo said that he was at "a place of reflection."

Cedillo ultimately did not resign and served out the remainder of his term. Shortly after leaving office, he released a three-page letter entitled "Why I Did Not Resign" in which he acknowledges that the conversation in the leaked recording “crossed a line at several points” but claims that the councilmembers were only trying to ensure that Latinos were adequately represented in redistricting. He also compared calls for him to resign to "cancel culture" and "McCarthyism."

After Martinez's resignation, both de León and Cedillo were stripped of their committee assignments by then-acting president Mitch O'Farrell.

== See also ==
- Bibliography of Los Angeles
- Outline of the history of Los Angeles
- Bibliography of California history
