= Vivica =

Vivica or Vivika are female given names. Notable people with these names include:

- Vivica Bandler (1917–2004), Finnish theater director
- Vivica A. Fox (born 1964), US actress
- Vivica Genaux (born 1969), US singer
- Otto and Vivika Heino, US ceramicists

== See also ==
- Viveca
- Ivica
- VICA (disambiguation)
- "Vivica", a song by Jack Off Jill from Clear Hearts Grey Flowers
