= Viča =

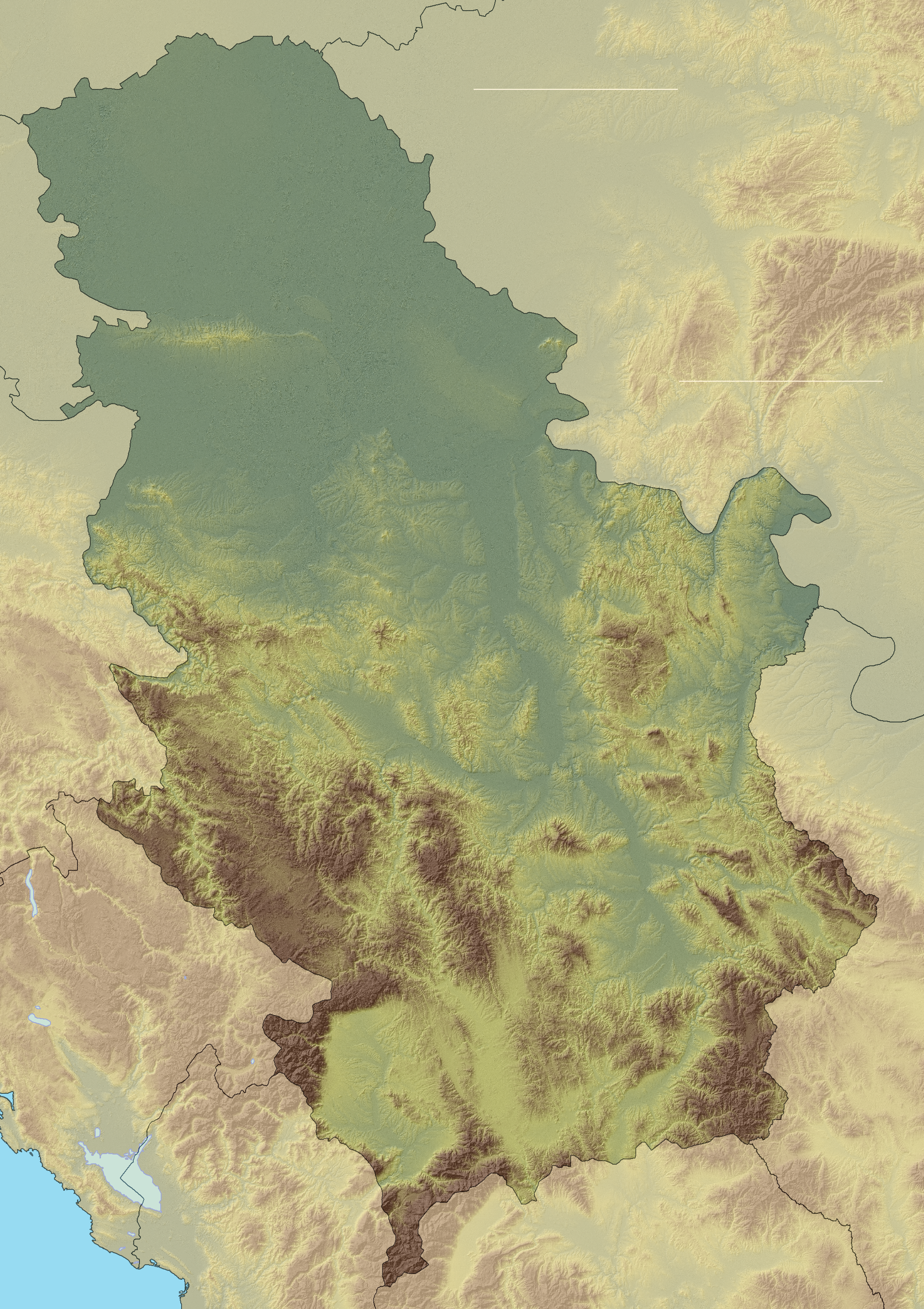

Viča (Serbian Cyrillic: Вича) is a Serbian place name. It may refer to:

- Viča, Lučani, Serbia
- Viča, Prokuplje, Serbia
- Viča, Štrpce, Kosovo

== See also ==
- Vića, Bosnia and Herzegovina
