= Pamela O'Connor =

Pamela or Pam O'Connor may refer to

- Pam O'Connor (politician), American politician
- Pamela O'Connor (figure skater) (born 1980) British ice dancer
