= Viveca =

Viveca or Viveka is a female given name, although Viveka can be a male given name in India. Notable people with these names include:

- Viveka (lyricist), Indian male lyricist working on Tamil language films and television, active 1999–present
- Viveka Babajee (1973–2010), Mauritian model and actress, Miss Mauritius World 1993, Miss Mauritius Universe 1994
- Viveka Davis (born 1969), American actress
- Viveka Eriksson or Viveca Eriksson (born 1956), politician on the autonomous Åland Islands, Premier of Åland 2007–2011
- Viveca Hollmerus (1920–2004), Finnish-Swedish author
- Viveca Lärn (born 1944), Swedish writer
- Viveca Lindfors (1920–1995), Swedish stage and film actress
- Viveca Lindfors (figure skater) (born 1999), Finnish figure skater
- Viveca Novak, American journalist
- Viveca Paulin (born 1969), Swedish actress and auctioneer
- Viveka Seldahl (1944–2001), Swedish actress
- Viveca Serlachius (1923–1993), Finnish-born Swedish actress
- Viveca Sten (born 1959), Swedish writer and lawyer
- Viveca Vázquez, Puerto Rican choreographer and dancer

== See also ==
- Vivica
