= Nury Martinez =

American politician (born 1973)

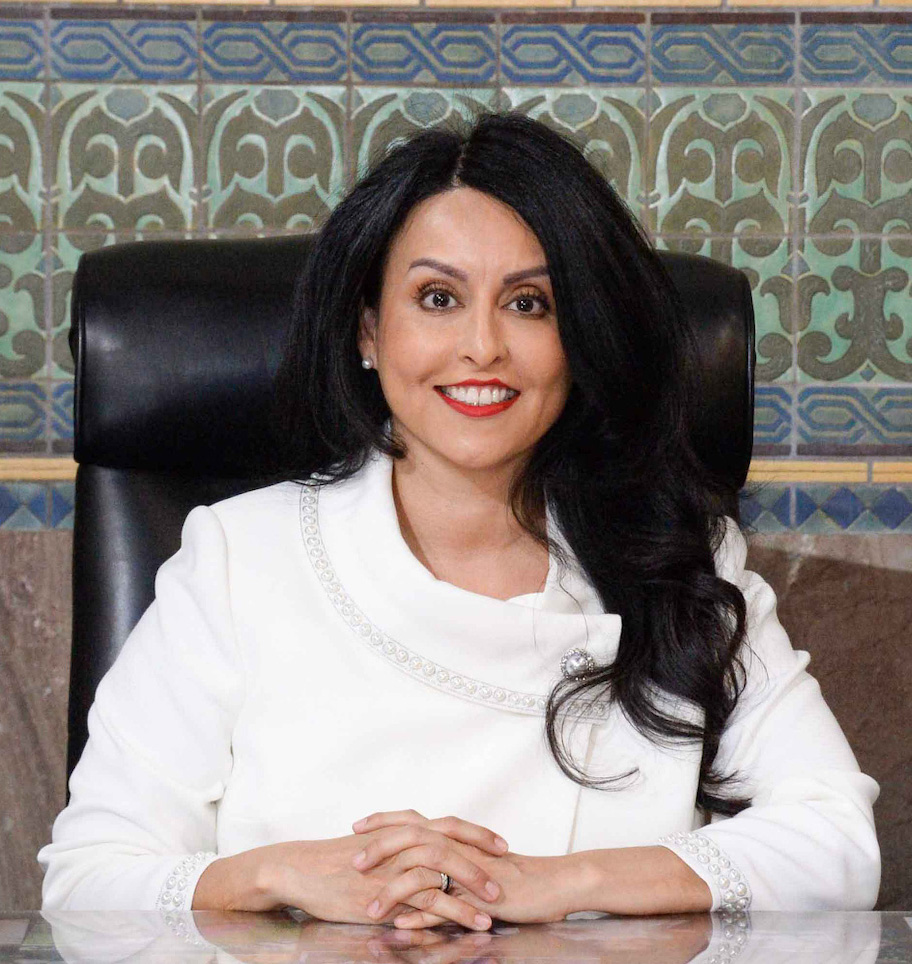
- Official portrait, 2020

President of the Los Angeles City Council
- In office January 5, 2020 – October 10, 2022
- Preceded by: Herb Wesson
- Succeeded by: Mitch O'Farrell (acting)

President pro tempore of the Los Angeles City Council
- In office January 22, 2019 – January 5, 2020
- Preceded by: Mitchell Englander
- Succeeded by: Joe Buscaino

Assistant President pro tempore of the Los Angeles City Council
- In office July 28, 2015 – January 22, 2019
- Preceded by: Tom LaBonge
- Succeeded by: Joe Buscaino

Member of the Los Angeles City Council from the 6th district
- In office August 9, 2013 – October 12, 2022
- Preceded by: Tony Cardenas
- Succeeded by: Imelda Padilla

Member of the Los Angeles Unified School District Board of Education from the 6th district
- In office July 1, 2009 – June 30, 2013
- Preceded by: Julie Korenstein
- Succeeded by: Mónica Ratliff

Personal details
- Born: July 9, 1973 (age 53) San Fernando Valley, California, U.S.
- Party: Democratic
- Spouse: Gerry Guzman
- Children: 1
- Education: California State University, Northridge (BA)

Nury Martinez (born July 9, 1973) is an American former politician who served as a member of the Los Angeles City Council for the 6th district from 2013 until her resignation in 2022. A former member of the Democratic Party, Martinez became president of the Los Angeles City Council in December 2019, after serving as the council's president pro tempore. Martinez was the first Latina to become council president. She was a member of the Los Angeles Unified School District Board of Education from 2009 to 2013.

On October 10, 2022, Martinez stepped down from her post as council president following the release of an audio recording where she disparaged fellow council members and their children and used racist language. She remained a member of the city council, but announced that she would be taking a paid leave of absence. On October 12, facing continued protests and demands to step down from community members and politicians including U.S. president Joe Biden, she resigned her seat on the council.

== Early life and education ==
Born and raised in the San Fernando Valley, she was the child of a dishwasher and a factory worker from Zacatecas. Martinez graduated from San Fernando High School in 1991 and from California State University, Northridge in 1996. Early in her career, she ran a support group for women living with AIDS at the Northeast Valley Health Corp. and worked as a special assistant to then-State Senator Alex Padilla.

== Career ==
Martinez served as the Executive Director of the environmental justice organization Pacoima Beautiful and was elected to the City of San Fernando City Council in 2003 and 2007, where she also served as Mayor. In 2009, she was elected as a member of the Board of Education of the Los Angeles Unified School District, representing Board District 6 with the endorsement of Los Angeles Teachers' Union. After getting union endorsement, she quickly sided with the charter schools.

== Los Angeles City Council ==
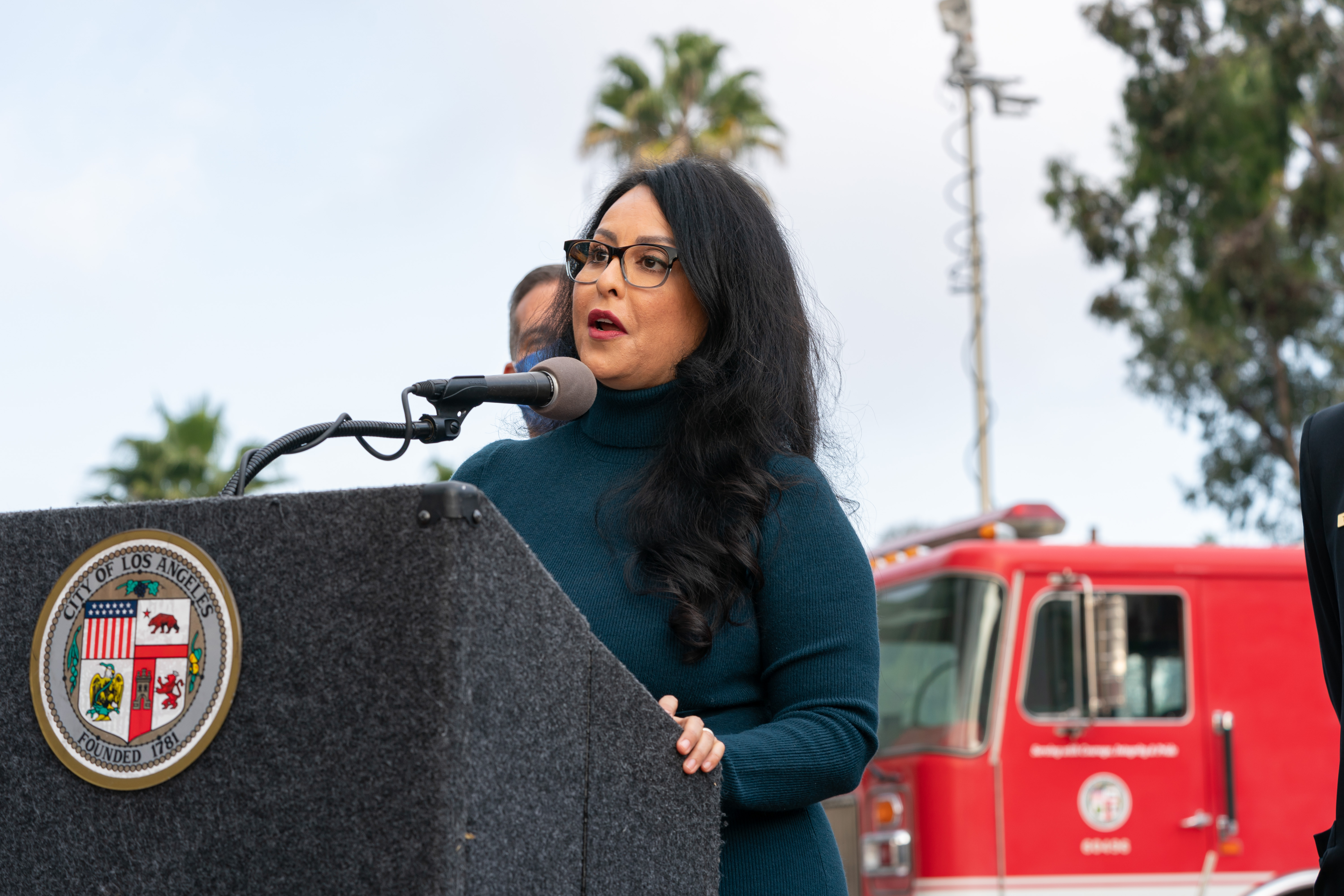
Martinez speaking at the nomination of Kristin Crowley as the next fire chief, 2022.

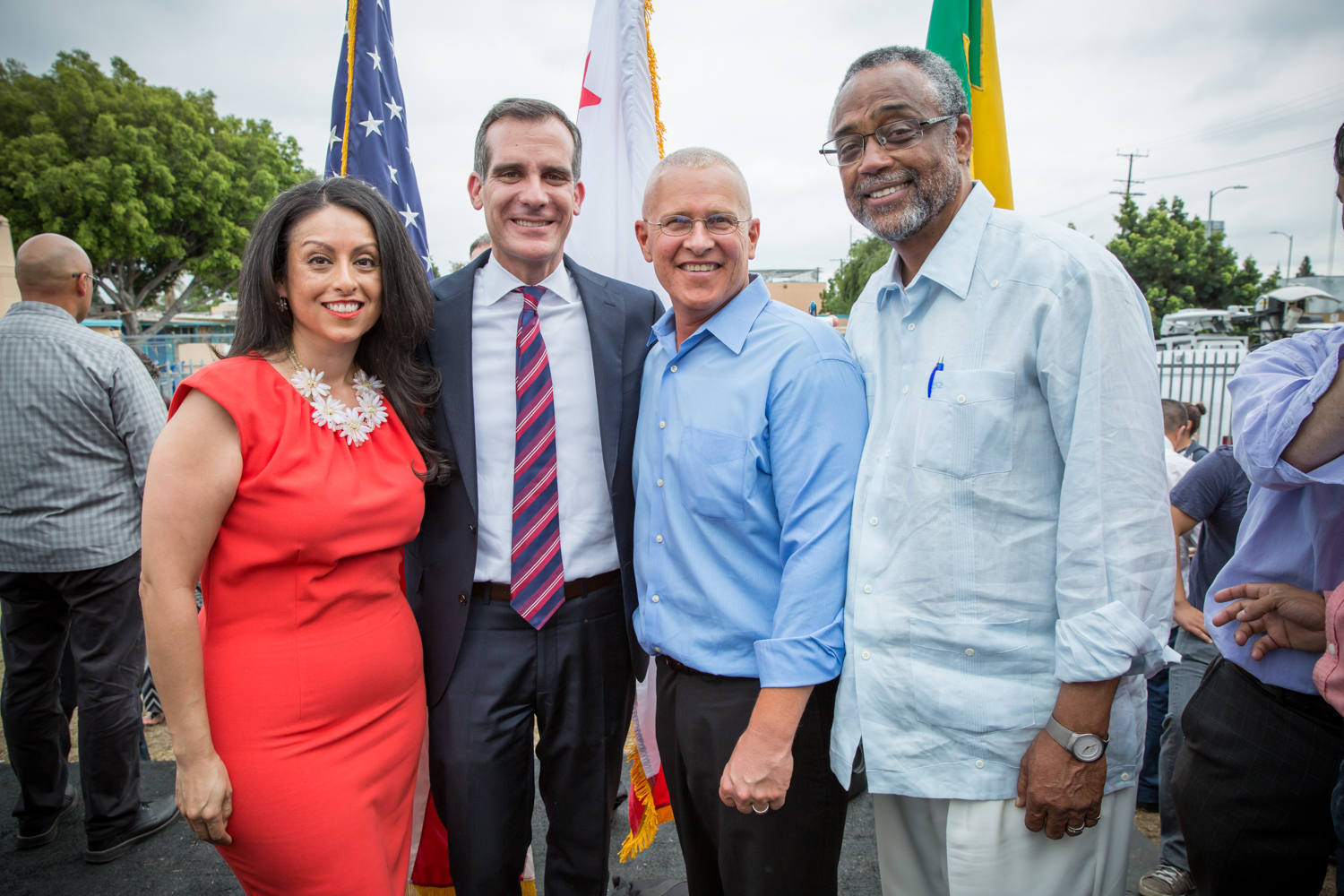
Martinez with Mayor Eric Garcetti and councilmembers Mike Bonin and Curren Price, 2015.

Martinez was elected to the Los Angeles City Council in a special election on July 23, 2013, to succeed Tony Cárdenas, who vacated his seat once elected to the U.S. House of Representatives for California's 29th congressional district. Martinez defeated former Assemblywoman Cindy Montañez in that election and again in a 2015 rematch when she won her first full term. Martinez was the only woman serving on the City Council for four years, until the election of Councilwoman Monica Rodriguez in July 2017 and was the first Latina member in a quarter century.

=== COVID-19 response ===
As City Council President during the COVID-19 pandemic, Martinez used her role to allocate hundreds of millions of dollars in federal CARES Act funding as part of her Families First agenda, supporting impacted Angelenos with rent, child care, and utility bills, as well as assistance to small businesses to stay afloat. In July 2020, she launched the Emergency Renters Assistance Program, which provided $103 million in subsidies of up to $2,000 per household for renters who could demonstrate how they were impacted by COVID-19 and who earned less than 80% of the area median income.

She also allocated $50 million to provide two weeks pay to those who were infected and could not work, $40 million for a regional COVID-19 Relief and Recovery Fund to provide grants to small businesses, which included specific allocations for micro-entrepreneurs like street vendors and for victims of domestic violence, and $30 million to assist low-income families access child care, which included $10 million to establish 50 Alternative Learning Centers at city parks, and $20 million to help child care facilities stay open and offer vouchers to families. In October 2020, she announced a $50 million program to provide one-time grants of $500 to help Angelenos who lost work because of the pandemic pay their utility bills over the holidays.

=== Minimum wage ===
Along with Councilmembers Curren Price and Mike Bonin, Martinez passed a law in 2014 boosting the minimum wage to $15.37 for employees at large hotels in Los Angeles. The following year, Martinez was one of six Councilmembers that led the successful push to raise the minimum wage from $9 to $15 for all workers in Los Angeles, to be gradually phased in over five years.

=== Human trafficking ===
Martinez had focused on domestic violence and human trafficking in her district and throughout the city. In 2014, Martinez passed an ordinance that temporarily prohibited strip clubs, massage parlors and other types of adult businesses from getting city permits along four streets in her district to crack down on prostitution.

In 2015, the Councilwoman led the creation of the Valley Bureau Human Trafficking Task Force, which targets the criminal enterprise behind prostitution and the "johns" that support this activity, as well as provides services to those who are sexually exploited. Within three years, the model had been expanded to a second task force in South Los Angeles.

In 2017, Martinez designated the first city-sponsored shelters for victims of human trafficking to be included in an expansion of the city's shelters for domestic violence victims. In 2019, Martinez supported a successful law authored by California State Senator Henry Stern, which clarified that local governments could adopt local ordinances to prevent slavery or human trafficking and allow for certain businesses and entities to post notices about resources available to victims of slavery and human trafficking.

=== Homelessness ===
In 2020, Councilwoman Martinez opened a temporary trailer shelter in Van Nuys as part of Mayor Eric Garcetti's "A Bridge Home" shelter program that provides shelter and services to homeless individuals before being placed in permanent housing. She also launched a program called Kids First to provide tutoring and other support services to homeless students living in three motels in her district, with particular support to address the challenges of distance learning caused by the COVID-19 pandemic.

=== Immigration ===
Councilwoman Martinez had also been an advocate for the undocumented community in the San Fernando Valley. In January 2020, she placed a ban on migrant centers within Los Angeles city limits after a children's migrant center was proposed in the community of Arleta in her district.

While President Trump was in office, Martinez called on the City of Los Angeles to sue the Trump Administration over its decision to implement a "public charge" rule, which would restrict public benefits such as medical care and housing for undocumented immigrants, as well as challenge the Trump Administration's policies related to detaining immigrant children and separating them from their families at U.S. borders.

=== Environmental justice ===
As the former Executive Director of Pacoima Beautiful, Martinez began working on a policy that she ultimately helped pass on the City Council in 2016 called the Clean Up, Green Up Initiative, which designated "green zones" in Pacoima, Sun Valley, Wilmington and Boyle Heights, some of Los Angeles's most polluted communities. The initiative consisted of special land-use restrictions, the creation of a citywide office to support environmental compliance, and citywide protections for new developments near freeways.

In early 2019, she joined several of her colleagues to introduce a local Green New Deal for the City of Los Angeles.

In August 2020, the Los Angeles Department of Water and Power revealed that there had been methane gas leaks at the Valley Generating Station in Martinez's district for over a year. Martinez subsequently called for the plant to be shut down, which was formalized by a vote of the City Council in November 2020 directing the department to develop a timeline for the plant's closure.

The Councilwoman employed two dedicated staffers to pick up trash and deal with illegal dumping in her district to supplement service provided by the city's Sanitation Department.

=== Fraud accusation ===
In 2015, Martinez's reelection campaign was accused of submitting fraudulent donor information in order to receive $65,360 in taxpayer-matched funds. In 2019, the Los Angeles County District Attorney's Office ended its investigation into Martinez's 2015 campaign, citing insufficient evidence to pursue a fraud case.

=== Racist comments and resignation ===
On October 9, 2022, an audio recording of a conversation involving Martinez, fellow council members Gil Cedillo and Kevin de León and Los Angeles County Federation of Labor President Ron Herrera regarding redistricting was leaked anonymously onto Reddit. In the meeting, Martinez stated, "Fuck that guy … He's with the blacks", referring to District Attorney George Gascón.

Martinez also insulted fellow council member Mike Bonin's black adopted child, saying "They're raising him like a little white kid ... I was like, 'This kid needs a beatdown. Let me take him around the corner, I'll bring him right back.'" Martinez also called the child a "changuito" according to the Los Angeles Times, a racial slur for a black person meaning "little monkey" or "little ape" in Spanish.

In the course of the discussion on redistricting, she commented, "I see a lot of little short dark people there" in reference to Koreatown. "Oaxacan Koreans. Not even like Kevin. Little ones," Cedillo replied. She then continued, "I was like, I don't know what village they came from, how they got here, but whatever." She can also be heard to remark, "tan feos" or "they're so ugly" in Spanish.

The three council members discussed how to appoint a new council member who would work in their interests, and also agreed to gerrymander Nithya Raman's district in order to suppress those who had voted for her. Heather Hutt, a former California State Director for then-Senator Kamala Harris was suggested. On August 26, 2022, Martinez introduced a motion to appoint Hutt as a council member, which was seconded by four other members. The motion was opposed by Marqueece Harris-Dawson and Mike Bonin, who instead proposed instructing the City Attorney to find eligibility requirements for appointments. On August 30, the vote to instate Hutt as a councilmember fell one vote short, with five voting for and five voting against; it was referred to the Rules, Elections and Intergovernmental Relations Committee for further discussion. The Committee cleared her for reconsideration by the Council the next day, and Hutt was confirmed by the Council in the next meeting and sworn in on September 2, 2022.

In addition, in the same leaked audio clips posted to Reddit in which former Los Angeles City Council President Nury Martinez made racist remarks about black people and Oaxacans, she also made crude remarks about Jewish people and Armenians. Martinez can be heard saying the “judíos” — which means Jews in Spanish — “cut their deal with South L.A.” Martinez was responding to former Los Angeles County Federation of Labor President Ron Herrera, who had concluded, “I’m sure Katz and his crew have an agenda,” referring to former state Assemblymember Richard Katz. “They are gonna screw everybody else,” Martinez said in the recording.

Martinez later provided a statement in the Los Angeles Times apologizing, "In a moment of intense frustration and anger, I let the situation get the best of me. I hold myself accountable for these comments. For that I am sorry." Bonin's family replied in a tweet condemning the racist comments and demanding Martinez's resignation.

On October 10, Martinez stepped down as president through a released statement that apologized to Bonin and others, saying, "Therefore, effective immediately I am resigning as President of the Los Angeles City Council," though she did not also resign from her seat on the city council.

One day later, Martinez announced she would be taking a leave of absence. In a statement, she said, "At this moment, I need to take a leave of absence and take some time to have an honest and heartfelt conversation with my family, my constituents, and community leaders. I am so sorry to the residents of Council District 6, my colleagues, and the City of Los Angeles." Martinez could only have been forced to leave office via a voter-led recall, as rules for removal by other city council members would not apply in this situation. On October 11, 2022, numerous calls for the three councilpersons to step down, which included that of President Joe Biden, as well as a contentious City Council meeting with a heated public comment session combined to put additional pressure on Martinez. She resigned her Council seat the following day.

== Personal life ==
Martinez is married to Gerry Guzman, a man who worked as a district director for Los Angeles area politicians Felipe Fuentes and Raul Bocanegra until forced to resign as a result of sexual remarks in the workplace.

She has a daughter and lives in Sun Valley, Los Angeles.

Political offices
Preceded by Tony Cardenas	Member of the Los Angeles City Council from the 6th district 2013–2022	Succeeded by Imelda Padilla
Preceded by Herb Wesson	President of the Los Angeles City Council; 2020–2022	Succeeded by Mitch O'Farrell (acting)
Preceded by Mitchell Englander	President Pro Tem of the Los Angeles City Council; 2019-2020	Succeeded by Joe Buscaino
Preceded by Tom LaBonge	Assistant President Pro Tem of the Los Angeles City Council; 2015–2019	Succeeded by Joe Buscaino
Academic offices
Preceded by Julie Korenstein	LAUSD Board Member, 6th District; 2009 - 2013	Succeeded by Mónica Ratliff
