= Mitch O'Farrell =

American politician (born 1960)

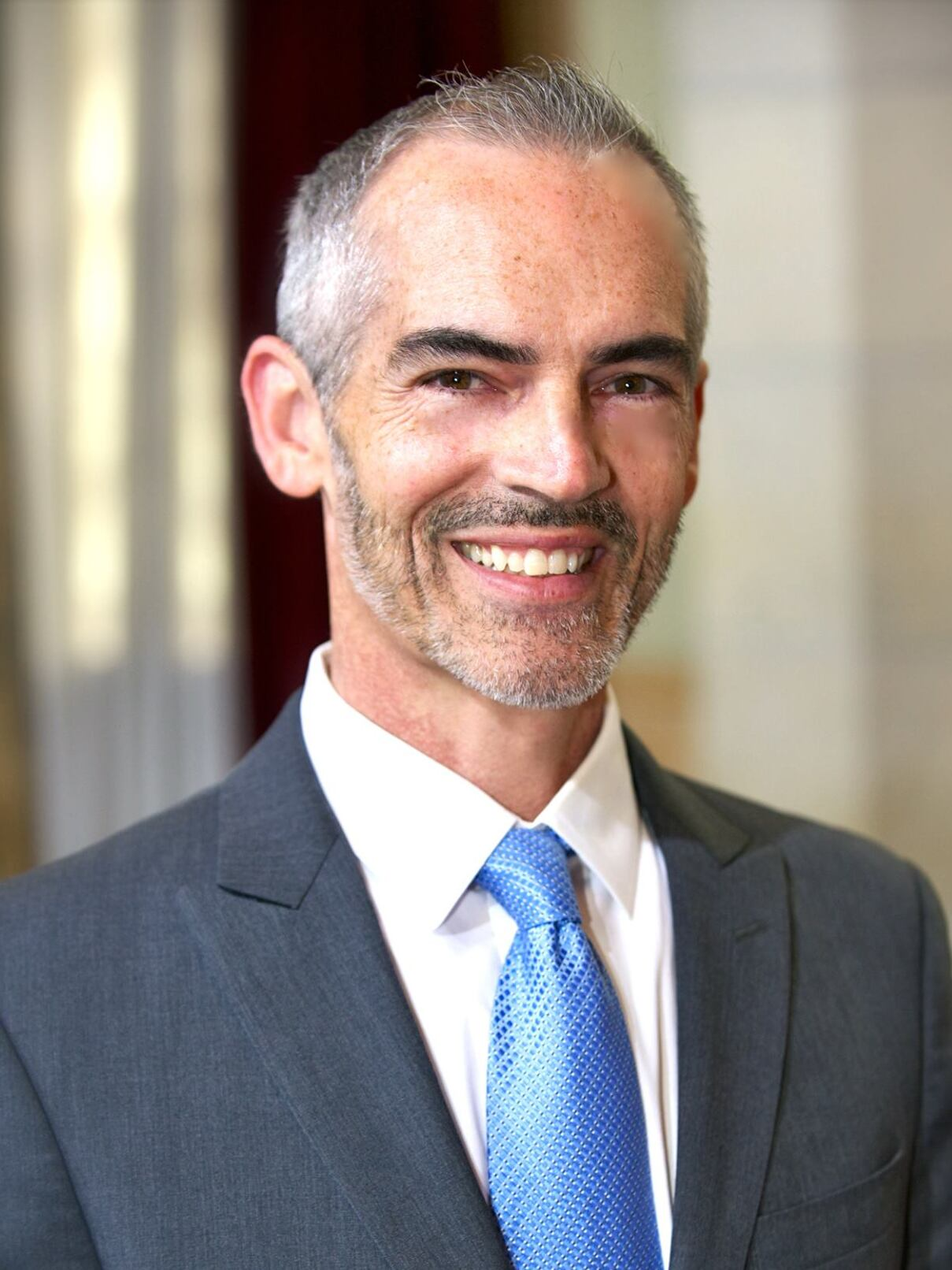
- Official portrait, 2013

President of the Los Angeles City Council
- Acting; October 10, 2022 – October 18, 2022
- Preceded by: Nury Martinez
- Succeeded by: Paul Krekorian

President pro tempore of the Los Angeles City Council
- In office October 1, 2021 – October 25, 2022
- Preceded by: Joe Buscaino
- Succeeded by: Curren Price

Member of the Los Angeles City Council from the 13th district
- In office July 1, 2013 – December 12, 2022
- Preceded by: Eric Garcetti
- Succeeded by: Hugo Soto-Martinez

Personal details
- Born: 1960 (age 65–66) Oklahoma, U.S.
- Party: Democratic
- Mitch O'Farrell's voice Mitch O'Farrell on his tenure in the Los Angeles City Council; Recorded November 23, 2022

Mitch O'Farrell (born 1960) is an American politician who served as a member of the Los Angeles City Council for the 13th district from 2013 to 2022. During his tenure, he served as President of the City Council for eight days amid the 2022 Los Angeles City Council scandal. A member of the Democratic Party, O'Farrell was the first Native American elected to the body and was one of its two openly gay members until the end of his second term in 2022.

== Early life ==
Mitch O'Farrell was born in Oklahoma in 1960 and raised in the Oklahoma City suburb of Moore, Oklahoma. He grew up in a farming community. His mother was an administrative assistant, and his father was a Teamster truck driver. O'Farrell is a member of the Wyandotte Nation, and is the first Native American to be elected to the Los Angeles City Council.

== Career ==
O'Farrell first moved to Los Angeles in 1982 for an audition. During the 1980s, he pursued a career in the arts and was a professional dancer and actor. He has lived in Glassell Park since 1992.

O'Farrell quickly became an active member of the Glassell Park and greater Los Angeles community. Most notably, he was elected President of the Glassell Park Improvement Association and helped form the Glassell Park Neighborhood Council. O'Farrell also served as president of the Northeast Democratic Club, and regularly volunteered at local non-profits including the Wildlife Waystation, Project Angel Food, and the Santa Cecilia Orchestra. In 2002, he was hired by then-Councilmember Garcetti to work in his office, where he remained for ten years. O'Farrell served as a field deputy, deputy director, district director, and finally as senior advisor.

== Los Angeles City Council (2013—2022) ==
=== Elections ===
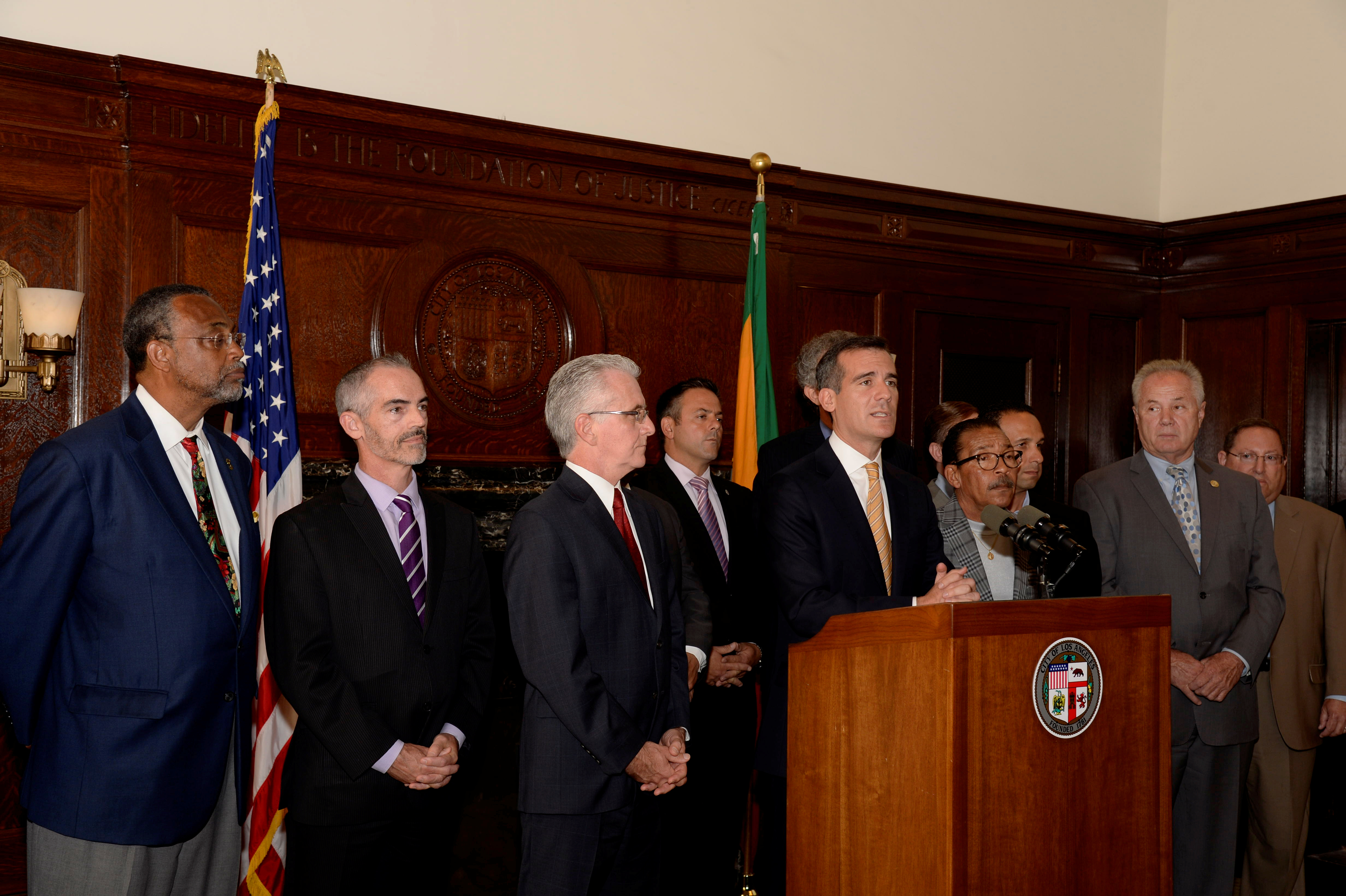
O'Farrell (second from left) during a press conference in 2013

==== 2013 ====
In 2013, O'Farrell ran for the City Council seat held by Garcetti, where he faced former Public Works Commissioner and labor activist John Choi. The contest between O'Farrell and Choi was noted for being unusually contentious. During the campaign, Choi accused O'Farrell of xenophobia during the contest over a campaign flier that included "a grainy picture of him above the words "not from our community." O'Farrell responded by saying that "I didn't like it anymore than you did, John" and noted it was from an independent group, but also noted that "[t]he fact is my opponent is new to the district... "I am the local candidate."

During the campaign, he was endorsed by many elected officials including Councilmembers Ed Reyes of the 1st district and Tom LaBonge of the 4th district. After a tumultuous campaign, O'Farrell won in the runoff of the election, receiving 53.05% to John Choi's 46.94%.

==== 2017 ====
O'Farrell was reelected with 59.26% of the vote (17,053 votes) in a wide-open contest. During the campaign, O'Farrell was endorsed in his reelection bid by Mayor Eric Garcetti and local chambers of commerce, among other politicians and organizations. Coming in second place was challenger Sylvie Shane, a founding member of the LA Tenants Union, who received 15.07% of the vote. Jessica Salans, who was endorsed by the Green Party and would later become chief of staff to Councilwoman Nithya Raman, came in a close third place.

==== 2022 ====
It was speculated that O'Farrell would receive a challenge from a progressive candidate in the 2022 election. Police abolitionist Albert Corado, homelessness policy advisor Kate Pynoos, and UNITE HERE organizer Hugo Soto-Martinez challenged O'Farrell from the left; Sheriff's Deputy Steve Johnson also ran against O'Farrell.

In October, O'Farrell became Acting President of the City Council for eight days following Nury Martinez's resignation in wake of the 2022 Los Angeles City Council controversy.

O'Farrell conceded the 2022 election to Soto-Martinez on November 15.

=== Tenure ===
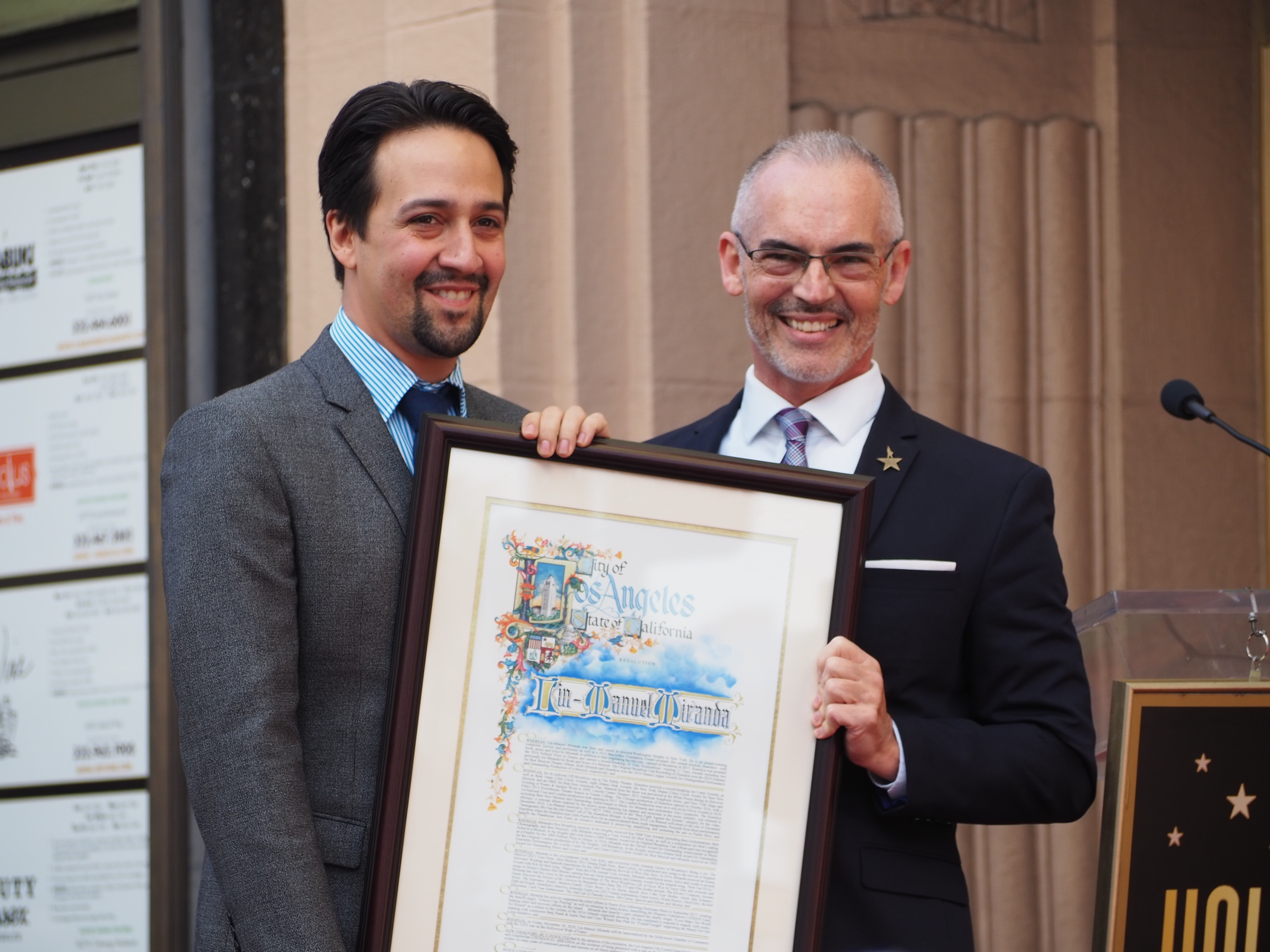
O'Farrell with Lin-Manuel Miranda on the Hollywood Walk of Fame in 2018

As the first Native American to serve on the Los Angeles City Council, O'Farrell has championed indigenous issues. He proposed and successfully established the creation of Indigenous Peoples Day in Los Angeles, and was endorsed by Chief Billy Friend of the Wyandotte Nation nearly a decade ago, during his 2013 City Council campaign.

O'Farrell has been a supporter of expanding the City's housing stock, particularly of covenanted affordable housing. During his time in office, over 4,300 units of covenanted affordable housing were built in Council District 13.

O'Farrell has been described as having "spearheaded efforts to remove the camp" of homeless people at Echo Park Lake through a polarizing police sweep near the end of the COVID-19 pandemic. Left-wing opponents of O'Farrell criticized him for "not doing more to ensure the safety of those living in the encampment". As chair of the City Council's Homelessness and Poverty Committee, O'Farrell spoke in favor of limiting which sidewalks homeless people could sleep and camp out on.

After the removal of the encampment, O'Farrell's office erected a fence around Echo Park Lake, enclosing and restricting access to the previously wide-open park, contracting private security to monitor the park, and installing surveillance cameras. Despite claims by O'Farrell's office that homeless people cleared from Echo Park Lake would be placed into permanent supportive housing, only nine of approximately 200 residents were in permanent housing a year after the sweep.

O'Farrell has focused on improving animal rights. O'Farrell notes that his work has led to the banning of coyote snare traps in Los Angeles, which he describes as "one of his proud accomplishments" in his official biography.

== Personal life ==
O'Farrell is openly gay. He resides with his partner George Brauckman in Glassell Park.

== Electoral history ==
=== 2013 ===
2013 Los Angeles City Council District 13 election
Primary election
Candidate	Votes	%
Mitch O'Farrell	3,535	18.44
John Choi	3,158	16.47
Sam Kbushyan	2,308	12.04
Josh Post	2,099	10.95
Alexander Cruz de Ocampo	2,012	10.50
Matt Szabo	1,440	7.51
Robert Negrete	1,400	7.30
Octavio Pescador	1,199	6.26
Jose Sigala	721	3.76
Emile Mack	672	3.51
Mike Schaefer	359	1.87
Roberto Haraldson	267	1.39
Total votes	19,170	100.00
General election
Mitch O'Farrell	13,940	52.75
John Choi	12,485	47.25
Total votes	26,425	100.00

=== 2017 ===
2017 Los Angeles City Council District 13 election
Primary election
Candidate	Votes	%
Mitch O'Farrell (incumbent)	17,053	59.26
Sylvie Shain	4,338	15.07
Jessica Salans	3,902	13.56
David de la Torre	1,534	5.33
Doug Haines	1,123	3.90
Bill Zide	829	2.88
Total votes	28,779	100.00

=== 2022 ===
2022 Los Angeles City Council District 13 election
Primary election
Candidate	Votes	%
Hugo Soto-Martinez	19,196	40.63
Mitch O'Farrell (incumbent)	14,952	31.65
Kate Pynoos	7,371	15.60
Stephen Johnson	3,648	7.72
Albert Corado	2,081	4.40
Total votes	47,248	100.00
General election
Hugo Soto-Martinez	38,069	57.8
Mitch O'Farrell (incumbent)	27,797	42.2
Total votes	65,866	100.00

Political offices
Preceded by Eric Garcetti	Member of the Los Angeles City Council from the 13th district 2013–present	Succeeded by Hugo Soto-Martinez
Preceded by Joe Buscaino	President pro tempore of the Los Angeles City Council; 2021–2022	Succeeded by Curren Price
Preceded by Nury Martinez	President of the Los Angeles City Council; Acting; 2022	Succeeded by Paul Krekorian
