= Valley Industry & Commerce Association =

Business association in the San Fernando Valley, California

- Founded: 1949
- Purpose: Business advocacy
- Location: San Fernando Valley, California
- Region served: (California) San Fernando Valley & Los Angeles Region
- Key people: Kevin Tamaki, Chairman and Stuart Waldman, President & CEO
- Website: www.vica.com

The Valley Industry & Commerce Association (VICA) is a business group in the San Fernando Valley, California. It is the most powerful business group in the Valley.

The San Fernando Valley, in Northwest Los Angeles County, is a varied economy consisting of entertainment, manufacturing, retail, international trade, healthcare, tourism, aviation, academia, financial services, goods movement, aerospace, and more.

== History and mission ==
Since 1949, VICA has served as a San Fernando Valley Business Advocacy on through advocacy at all levels of government.

The mission of VICA is to enhance the economic vitality of the greater San Fernando Valley region by advocating for a better business climate and quality of life. With its knowledge of the legislative process and economic issues, VICA's access to public officials ensures that the San Fernando Valley's business perspective will be heard in the interest of improving our business climate and quality of life. With input and guidance from its members, VICA maintains a regular presence at all levels of government to effectively represent Valley businesses.

== Structure ==
VICA is led by a board of directors, composed of many of the top business leaders in the San Fernando Valley region and is currently chaired by Victor Berrellez (U.S. Bank). VICA's chief staff member is currently President Stuart Waldman.

VICA's advocacy efforts originate in its policy committees (divided up by issues, such as Healthcare and Transportation). Members discuss and determine positions on various policies, which are ultimately voted on by the VICA board. VICA advocates on these issues, through written or oral testimony, and meetings with officeholders locally, in Sacramento, or in Washington, D.C.

== Events ==
Among the key components of VICA's advocacy strategy are legislative trips to Washington, D.C. and Sacramento, and frequent events bringing together officeholders and business leaders.

VICA also organizes an annual public policy conference attended by 450-550 business leaders and government officials, among other events.
