= Pam O'Connor (politician) =

American politician

Pam O'Connor is the former mayor and former Acting Mayor of Santa Monica, California following the death of Ken Genser. She previously served this post from 1998 to 1999, and from 2004 to 2005.

Preceded by Robert Holbrook	Mayors of Santa Monica; 1998-1999	Succeeded by
Preceded by	Mayors of Santa Monica; 2004-2005	Succeeded by Robert Holbrook
