= Vića =

- Village
- Location within Bosnia and Herzegovina
- Coordinates: 43°56′N 18°25′E
- Country: Bosnia and Herzegovina
- Entity: Federation of Bosnia and Herzegovina
- Canton: Sarajevo
- Municipality: Centar Sarajevo

Area
  - Total: 2.63 sq mi (6.82 km^{2})

Population (2013)
  - Total: 5
  - Density: 1.9/sq mi (0.73/km^{2})
- Time zone: UTC+1 (CET)
  - Summer (DST): UTC+2 (CEST)

Vića is a village in Centar municipality, in town of Sarajevo, Federation of Bosnia and Herzegovina, Bosnia and Herzegovina.

== Demographics ==
=== Ethnic composition, 1991 census ===
total: 5

- Serbs - 5 (100%)

According to the 2013 census, its population was 5.

Ethnicity in 2013
| Ethnicity | Number | Percentage |
|---|---|---|
| Bosniaks | 2 | 40.0% |
| other/undeclared | 3 | 60.0% |
| Total | 5 | 100% |
