= United Teachers Los Angeles =

American teachers union

- Abbreviation: UTLA
- Founded: 1970
- Headquarters: 3303 Wilshire Blvd., 10th Floor Los Angeles, CA 90010 34.062421°N 118.294575°W
- Location: United States
- Members: 35,000 (2013)
- Key people: Cecily Myart-Cruz, President
- Website: utla.net

United Teachers Los Angeles (UTLA) is the main trade union for certified, non-administrative staff in the Los Angeles Unified School District. The union was incorporated in 1970 by the merger between the (AFT-local) Los Angeles Teachers Alliance and the (NEA-local) Classroom Teachers of Los Angeles.

== Strikes ==
=== 1989 strike ===
On May 30, 1989, approximately 20,000 UTLA members went out on strike for higher pay and more administrative control. The strike lasted nine days starting on May 30, 1989. The months preceding the strike were highly contentious. Numerous negotiation tactics were deployed by both sides including teacher demonstrations, threats to withhold grades, threats to dock teacher pay and many hard fought court battles. Union demands included pay increases and better school conditions. Thousands of substitute teachers were mobilized in preparation for the strike, and teachers prepared by saving money to endure a long walk-out. Many of the city's 600 schools reportedly remained open but with lower attendance. The district reported that 8,642 teachers crossed picket lines, and public rhetoric by both sides was critical and intense. After negotiations, a settlement was reached and a three-year contract produced. Both sides claimed victory. Despite successful teacher pay raises obtained in the settlement, a massive economic recession in 1990 caused negotiations in 1991 to focus on preventing massive layoffs due to hundreds of millions in budget deficits.

=== 2019 strike ===
In August 2018, under the leadership of progressive UTLA President Alex Caputo-Pearl, 98% of UTLA members authorized a strike following months of contract negotiation disputes. Though teachers were also striking to highlight issues like demands for pay raises, public discussion became predominantly focused on the union's opposition to charter schools. Though one in five LAUSD students attended a charter school at the time of the strike, UTLA argued that independent charter schools were siphoning money from traditional public schools.

A fact-finding report failed to resolve matters and UTLA stated that a strike would proceed on January 10, 2019. The school district attempted to stop the strike on legal grounds, but a judge allowed it to proceed. 30,000 teachers walked out of class and onto the picket line in what became the first such strike in Los Angeles in thirty years, which would last six days. Following the six days of crowded rallies, UTLA and the school district reached a deal on a new contract on January 22, 2019, which included teacher pay raises, full-time librarians for middle and high schools, a commitment to provide full-time nurses for every school, and the establishment of thirty "community schools" in the model of Austin, Texas and Cincinnati, though UTLA failed to impose a binding cap on charter schools.

In October 2024, UTLA passed a resolution calling for the United States to stop providing weapons to Israel.
