= List of elected officials in Los Angeles =

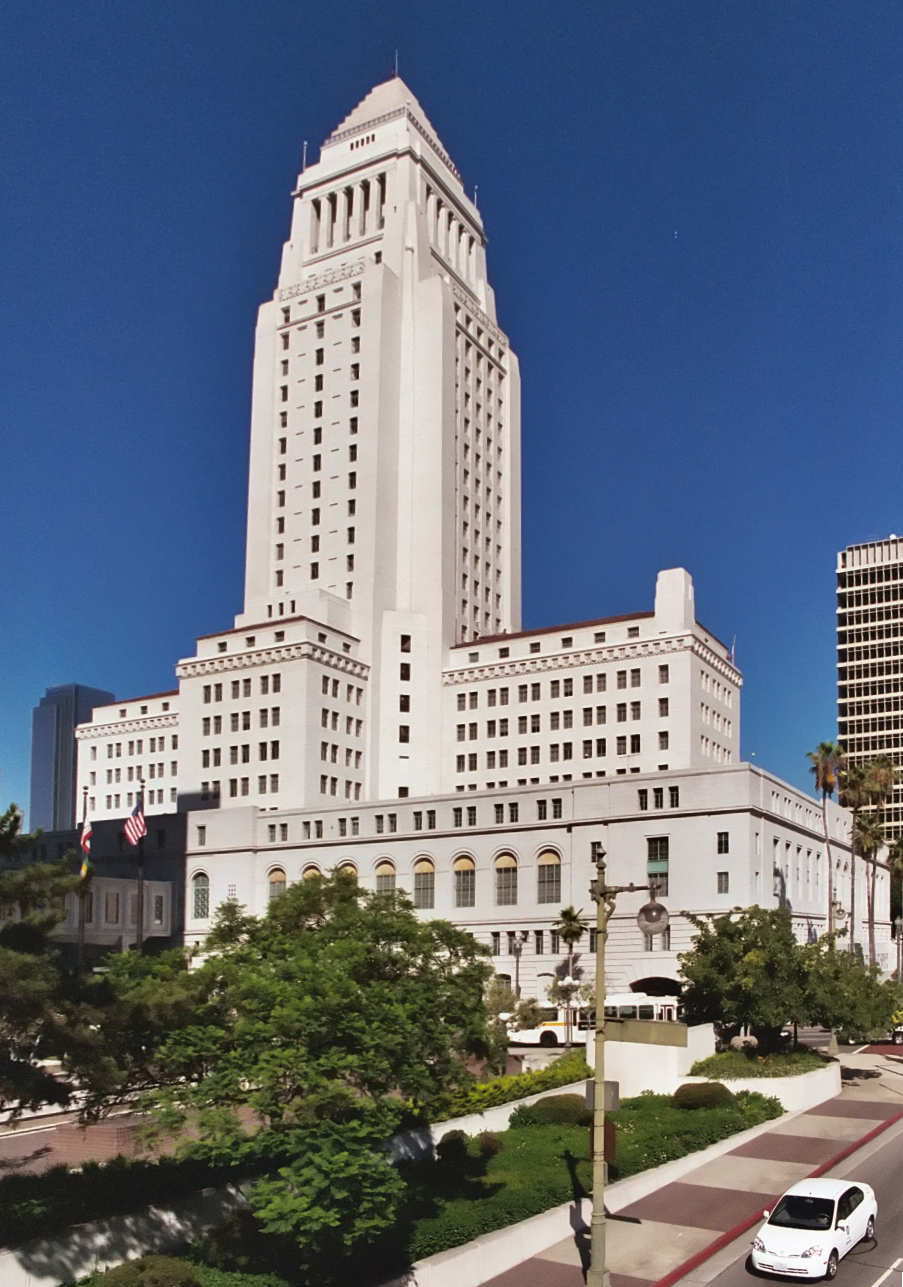
Los Angeles City Hall

This is a list of elected officials serving the city of Los Angeles, California. It includes member of the Los Angeles City Council, Los Angeles County Board of Supervisors, California State Assembly, California State Senate, United States House of Representatives, and Los Angeles citywide officials.

== City officers ==
Office	Name	Party	Elected
Mayor	Karen Bass	Democratic	2022
City Attorney	Hydee Feldstein Soto	Democratic	2022
City Controller	Kenneth Mejia	Green	2022

== City Council members ==
District	Name	Party	Elected
1	Eunisses Hernandez	Democratic	2022
2	Adrin Nazarian	Democratic	2024
3	Bob Blumenfield	Democratic	2013
4	Nithya Raman	Democratic	2020
5	Katy Yaroslavsky	Democratic	2022
6	Imelda Padilla	Democratic	2023 (special)
7	Monica Rodriguez	Democratic	2017
8	Marqueece Harris-Dawson	Democratic	2015
9	Curren Price	Democratic	2013
10	Heather Hutt	Democratic	2022
11	Traci Park	Democratic	2022
12	John Lee	Independent	2019 (special)
13	Hugo Soto-Martinez	Democratic	2022
14	Ysabel Jurado	Democratic	2024
15	Tim McOsker	Democratic	2022

== U.S. House of Representatives ==
District	Name	Party	Elected
27th	George T. Whitesides	Democratic	2024
29th	Luz Rivas	Democratic	2024
30th	Laura Friedman	Democratic	2024
32nd	Brad Sherman	Democratic	1996
34th	Jimmy Gomez	Democratic	2017 (special)
36th	Ted Lieu	Democratic	2014
37th	Sydney Kamlager-Dove	Democratic	2022
43rd	Maxine Waters	Democratic	1990
44th	Nanette Barragán	Democratic	2016

== California State Senate ==
District	Name	Party	Elected
20th	Caroline Menjivar	Democratic	2022
24th	Ben Allen	Democratic	2022
26th	María Elena Durazo	Democratic	2018
27th	Henry Stern	Democratic	2016
28th	Lola Smallwood-Cuevas	Democratic	2022
33rd	Lena Gonzalez	Democratic	2019 (special)
35th	Laura Richardson	Democratic	2024

== California Assembly ==
District	Name	Party	Elected
40th	Pilar Schiavo	Democratic	2022
42nd	Jacqui Irwin	Democratic	2014
43rd	Celeste Rodriguez	Democratic	2024
44th	Nick Schultz	Democratic	2024
46th	Jesse Gabriel	Democratic	2018 (special)
51st	Rick Zbur	Democratic	2022
52nd	Jessica Caloza	Democratic	2024
54th	Mark Gonzalez	Democratic	2024
55th	Isaac Bryan	Democratic	2021 (special)
57th	Sade Elhawary	Democratic	2024
61st	Tina McKinnor	Democratic	2022 (special)
65th	Mike Gipson	Democratic	2014
66th	Al Muratsuchi	Democratic	2016

== County Officers ==
Office	Name	Party	Elected
District Attorney	Nathan Hochman	Independent	2024
Sheriff	Robert Luna	Democratic	2022
County Assessor	Jeffrey Prang	Democratic	2014

== Los Angeles County Board of Supervisors ==
District	Name	Party	Elected
1	Hilda Solis	Democratic	2014
2	Holly Mitchell	Democratic	2020
3	Lindsey Horvath	Democratic	2022
4	Janice Hahn	Democratic	2016
5	Kathryn Barger	Republican	2016
