= 2024 Los Angeles elections =

- March 5, 2024; November 5, 2024

7 out of 15 seats in the City Council 8 seats needed for a majority
	Majority party	Minority party
Party	Democratic	Independent
Seats before	14	1
Seats won	6	1
Seats after	14	1
Seat change	Steady	Steady

The 2024 Los Angeles elections were held on March 5, 2024. Voters will elect candidates in a nonpartisan primary, with runoff elections scheduled for November 5. Seven of the fifteen seats in the City Council will be up for election.

Municipal elections in California are officially nonpartisan; candidates' party affiliations do not appear on the ballot.

== City council ==
=== District 2 ===
2024 Los Angeles City Council District 2 election
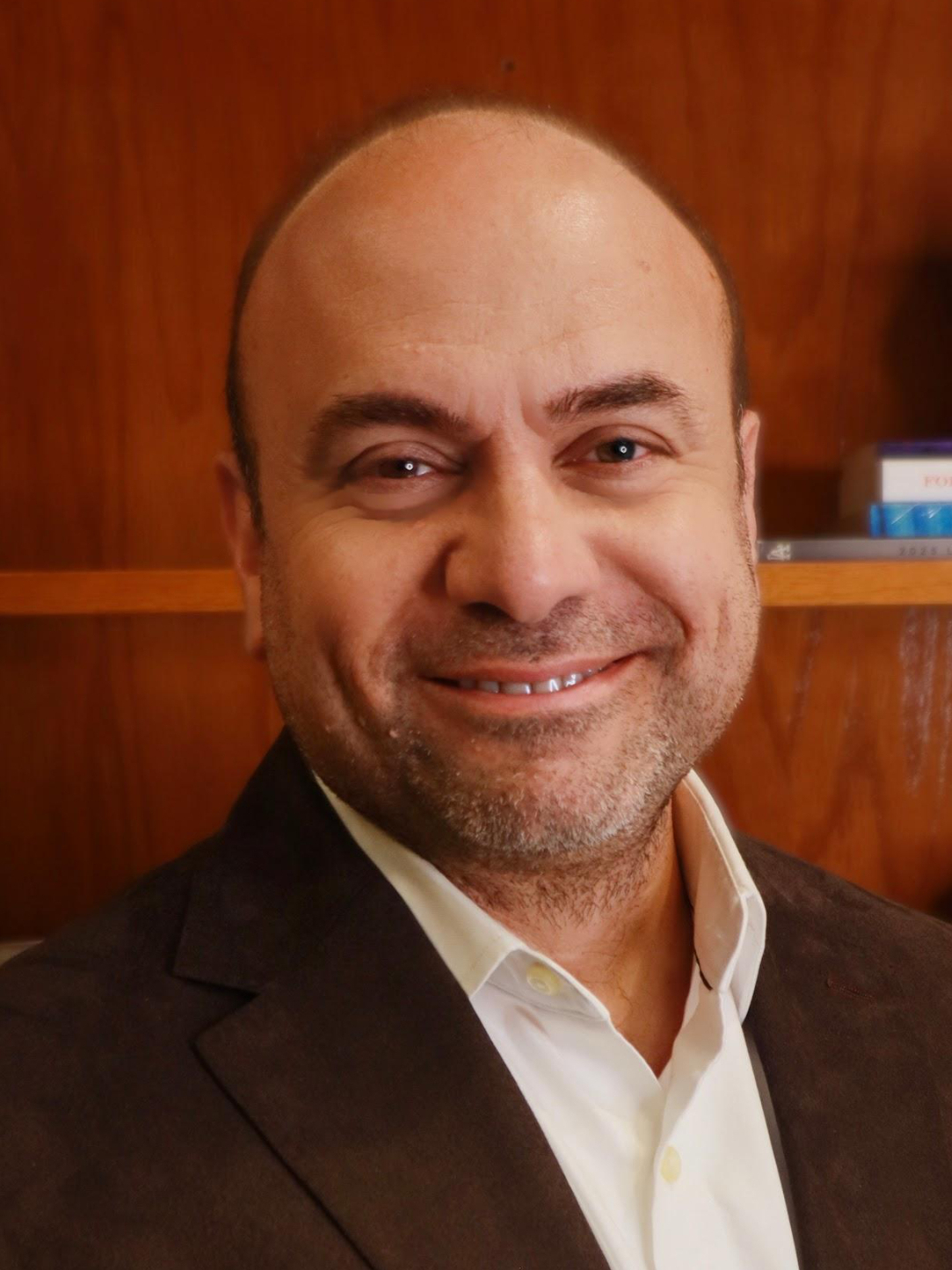

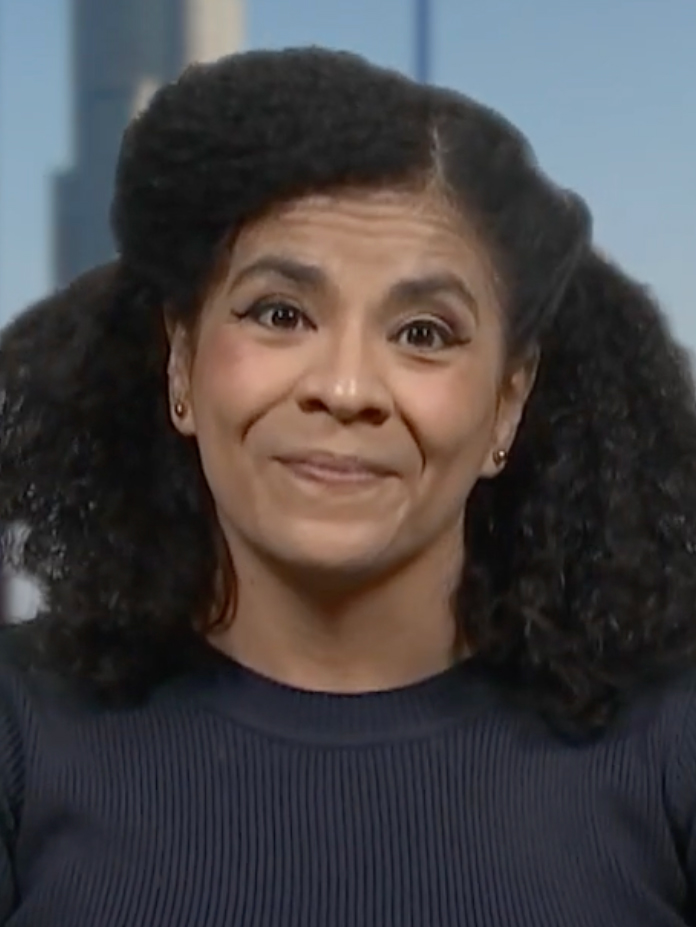

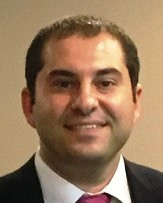

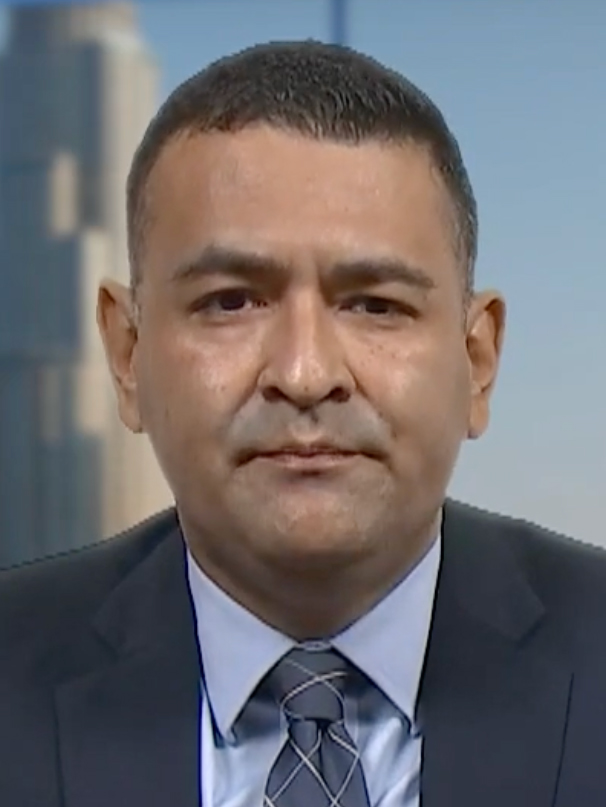

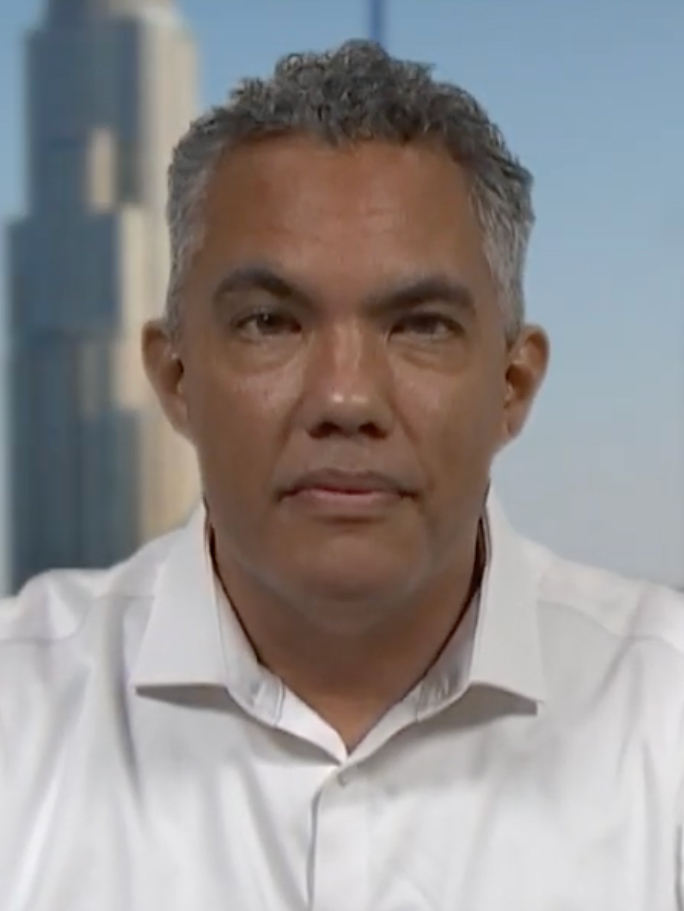
Candidate	Adrin Nazarian	Jillian Burgos	Sam Kbushyan
First round	14,033; 37.18%	8,430; 22.34%	5,561; 14.74%
Runoff	44,538; 53.84%	38,185; 46.16%	Eliminated
Candidate	Manuel Gonez	Jon-Paul Bird
First round	4,613; 12.22%	2,685; 7.12%
Runoff	Eliminated	Eliminated
City councilor before election
Paul Krekorian
City councilor after election
Adrin Nazarian

The 2nd district is located in the San Fernando Valley, including North Hollywood, Studio City, Sun Valley, Valley Glen, Van Nuys, and Toluca Lake. The incumbent was council president Paul Krekorian, who was first elected in 2009 after the resignation of Wendy Greuel. He was term-limited and could not seek re-election to office. Former assemblymember Adrin Nazarian and neighborhood councilor Jillian Burgos advanced to the runoff, where Nazarian won against Burgos.

==== Candidates ====
===== Declared =====
- Rudy Melendez, laborer and artist
- Jillian Burgos, North Hollywood neighborhood councilor
- Adrin Nazarian, former California state assemblyman
- Jon-Paul Bird, mental health professional
- Manuel Gonez, TreePeople policy director and husband of Los Angeles Board of Education member Kelly Gonez
- Sam Kbushyan, member of the Respiratory Care Board of California
- Marine Ghandilyan, lawyer

===== Withdrew =====
- Willie Fort

===== Endorsements =====
Jillian Burgos

Local politicians

- Kenneth Mejia, 20th Los Angeles City Controller
- Konstantine Anthony, Burbank city councilor

Labor unions

- California Nurses Association

Organizations

- Los Angeles Democratic Socialists of America
- Our Revolution - Feel the Bern Los Angeles
Manuel Gonez

State senators

- Richard Polanco, former state senator for the 22nd district

Local politicians

- Ed Reyes, former Los Angeles city councilor for the 1st district
Adrin Nazarian

U.S. Representatives

- Adam Schiff, U.S. Representative for the 30th district

Local officials

- Karen Bass, 43rd mayor of Los Angeles
- Robert Luna, 34th Sheriff of Los Angeles County
- Paul Krekorian, incumbent councilor for this district
- Bob Blumenfield, city councilor for the 3rd district
- Tim McOsker, city councilor for the 15th district

Organizations

- Armenian National Committee of America–Western Region

Newspapers

- Los Angeles Times

==== Results ====
2024 Los Angeles City Council District 2 election
Candidate	Votes	%
Adrin Nazarian	**14,033**	**37.18**
Jillian Burgos	**8,430**	**22.34**
Sam Kbushyan	5,561	14.74
Manuel Gonez	4,613	12.22
Jon-Paul Bird	2,685	7.11
Rudy Melendez	1,406	3.73
Marin Ghandilyan	1,012	2.68
Total votes	**37,740**	**100.00**
General election
Adrin Nazarian	**44,538**	**53.84**
Jillian Burgos	38,185	46.16
Total votes	**82,723**	**100.00**

=== District 4 ===
2024 Los Angeles City Council District 4 election
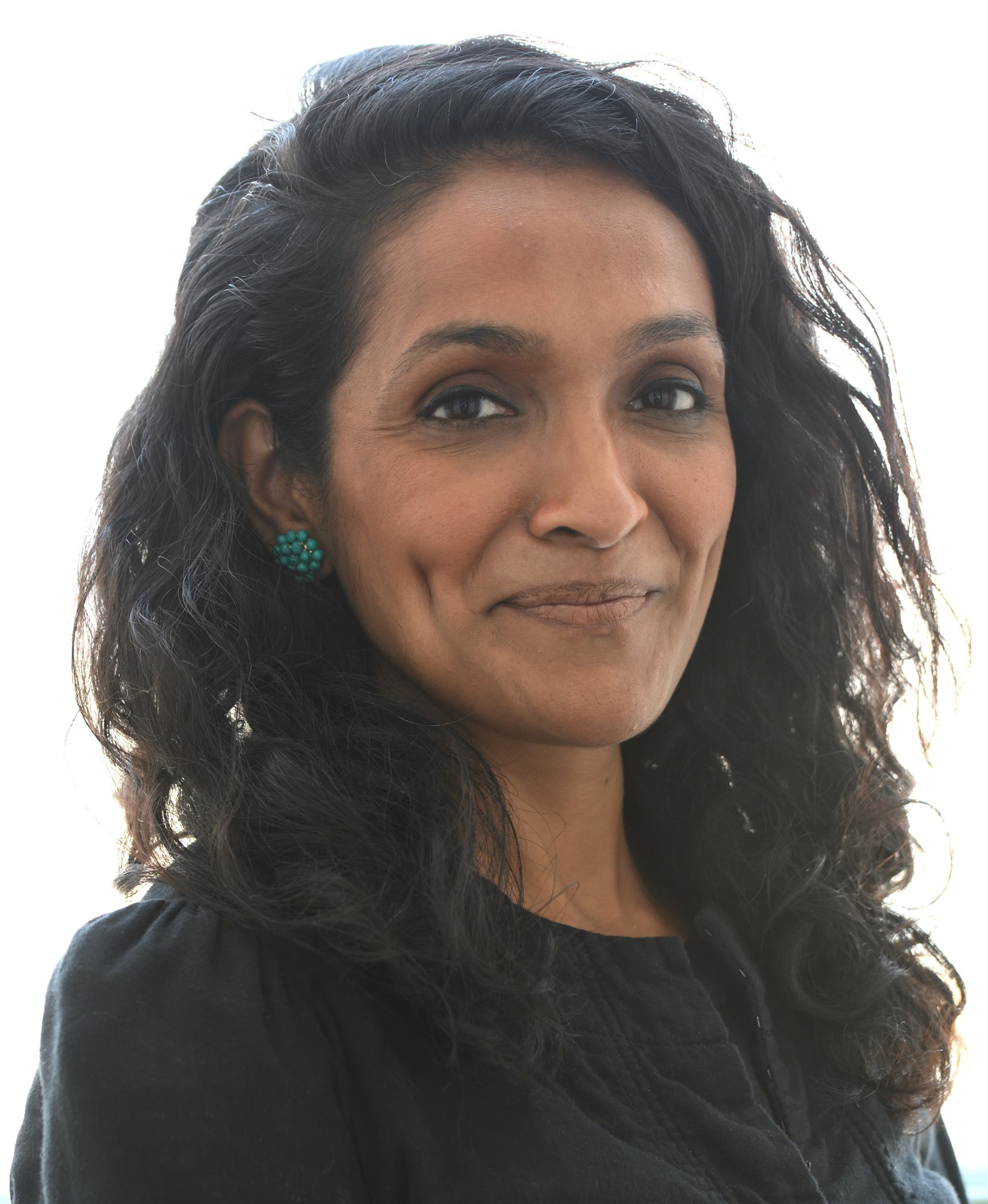

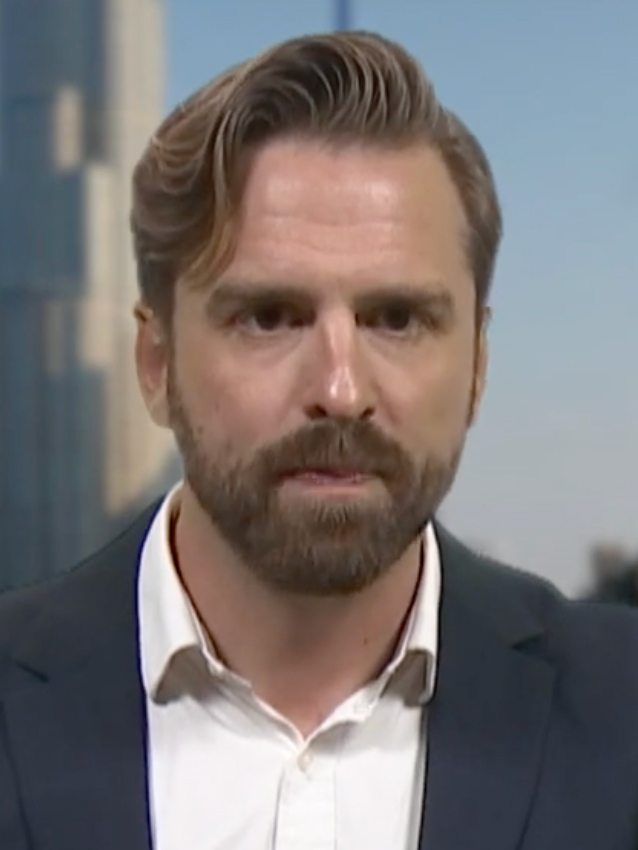

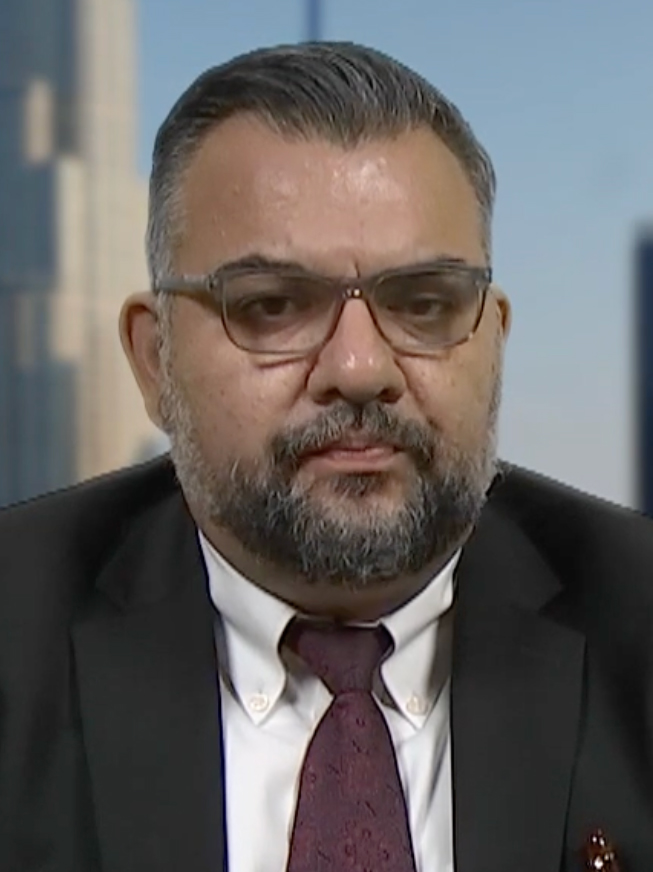
Candidate	Nithya Raman	Ethan Weaver	Levon Baronian
Popular vote	32,562	24,799	6,899
Percentage	50.67%	38.59%	10.74%
City councilor before election
Nithya Raman
City councilor after election
Nithya Raman

The 4th district includes all or parts of Encino, Studio City, Reseda, Sherman Oaks, Silver Lake, Los Feliz and Hollywood Hills. The incumbent was Nithya Raman, who was first elected with 52.9% of the vote in 2020. Raman sought re-election to a second term in office. The district was drastically changed from the previous election due to the 2021 redistricting, with 40% of the district's population being allocated to other districts. Initial results showed that Raman and her challenger, Ethan Weaver, were set for a runoff since neither had secured a majority of votes. With subsequent returns, however, Raman crossed the 50% threshold and won reelection outright.

==== Candidates ====
===== Declared =====
- Levon Baronian, Sherman Oaks neighborhood councilor and engineer
- Nithya Raman, incumbent councilor
- Ethan Weaver, neighborhood prosecutor in the Los Angeles City Attorney's office

===== Endorsements =====
Nithya Raman

U.S. Representatives

- Brad Sherman, U.S. Representative for California's 32nd district

Mayors

- Karen Bass, 43rd mayor of Los Angeles

Local politicians

- Bob Blumenfield, Los Angeles city councilor for the 3rd district
- Marqueece Harris-Dawson, Los Angeles city councilor for the 8th district
- Eunisses Hernandez, Los Angeles city councilor for the 1st district
- Hugo Soto-Martinez, Los Angeles city councilor for the 13th district

Individuals

- Tina Fey, actress and comedian
- Scarlett Johansson, actress
- Colin Jost, actor and comedian
- Nick Kroll, actor and comedian
- Bob Odenkirk, actor and writer

Labor unions

- United Teachers Los Angeles

Organizations

- Los Angeles Democratic Socialists of America
- California Working Families Party

Newspapers

- Los Angeles Times
Ethan Weaver

Local officials

- Mitch O'Farrell, former Los Angeles city councilor

==== Results ====
2024 Los Angeles City Council District 4 election
Candidate	Votes	%
Nithya Raman (incumbent)	**32,562**	**50.67**
Ethan Weaver	24,799	38.59
Levon Baronian	6,899	10.74
Total votes	**64,260**	**100.00**

=== District 6 ===
2024 Los Angeles City Council District 6 election
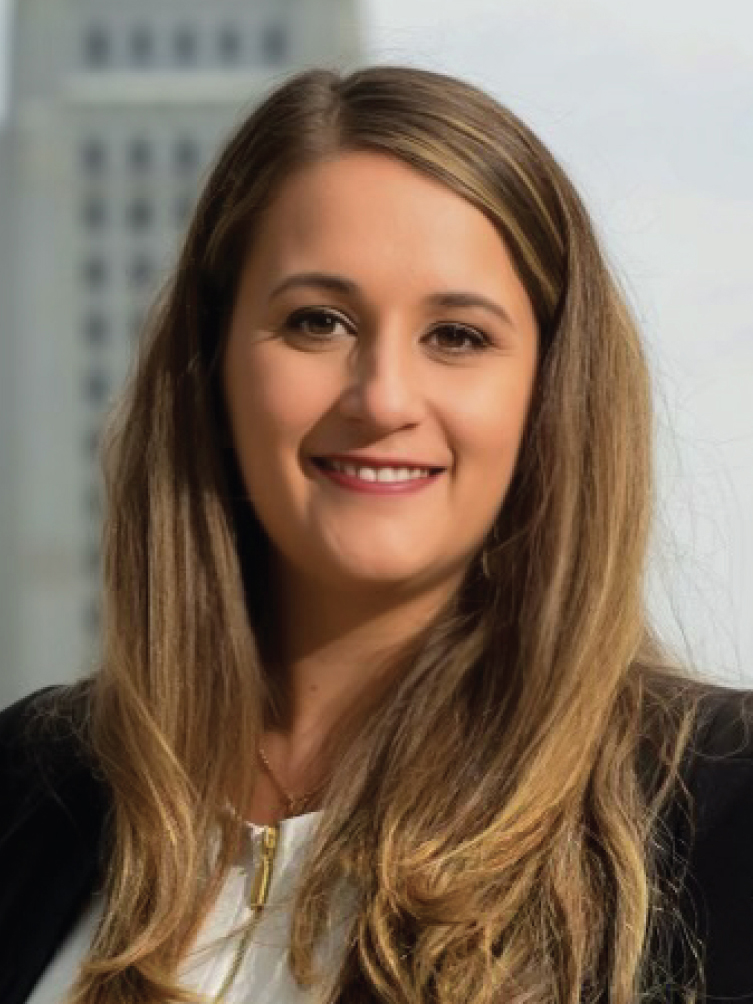

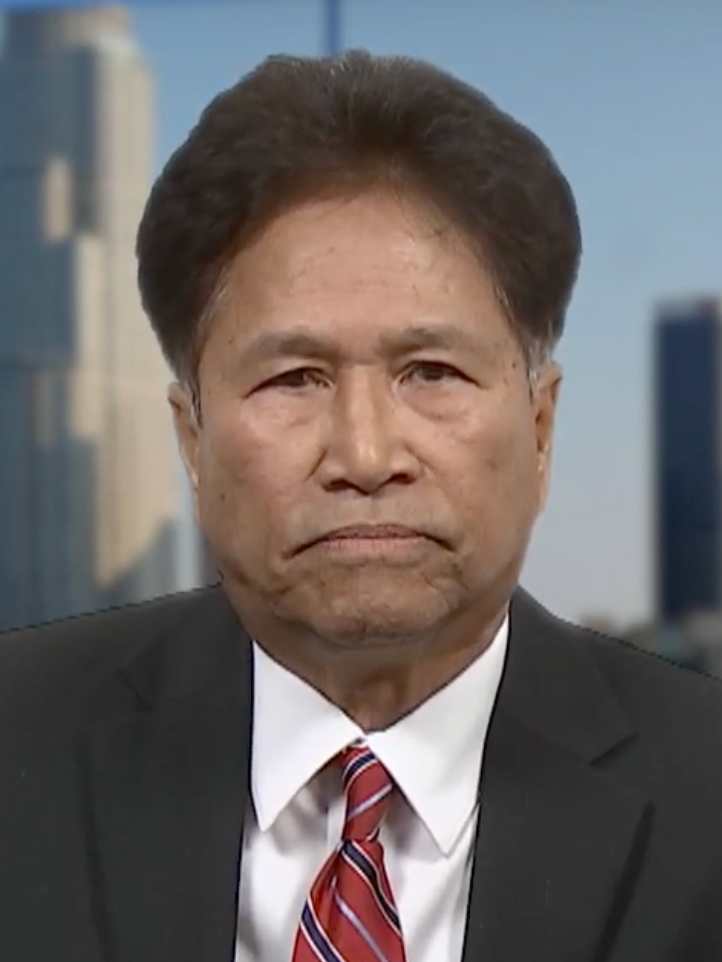

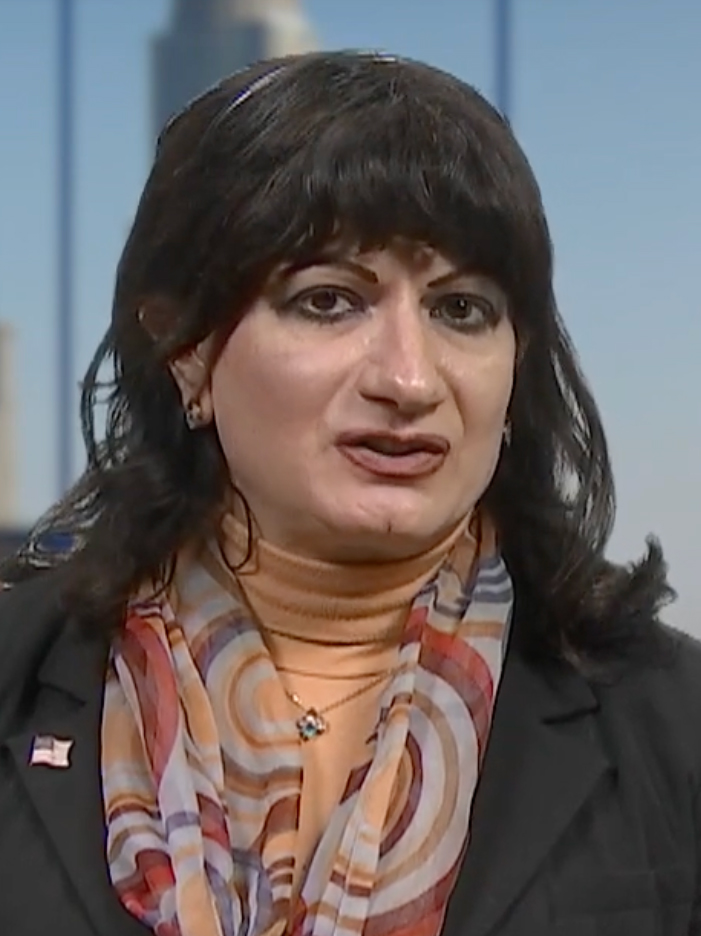
Candidate	Imelda Padilla	Ely De La Cruz Ayao	Carmenlina Minasova
Popular vote	16,476	2,485	2,067
Percentage	78.35%	11.82%	9.83%
City councilor before election
Imelda Padilla
City councilor after election
Imelda Padilla

The 6th district is in the central and eastern San Fernando Valley, including Arleta, Lake Balboa, North Hollywood, North Hills, Panorama City, Van Nuys and Sun Valley. The incumbent was Imelda Padilla, who was elected in 2023 after the resignation of Nury Martinez after the 2022 Los Angeles City Council scandal. Padilla ran for re-election to a full term in office, which she won in a landslide.

==== Declared ====
- Imelda Padilla, incumbent councilor
- Ely De La Cruz Ayao, real estate broker
- Carmenlina Minasova, respiratory care practitioner

===== Endorsements =====
Imelda Padilla

Newspapers

- Los Angeles Times
- Los Angeles Daily News

==== Results ====
2024 Los Angeles City Council District 6 election
Candidate	Votes	%
Imelda Padilla (incumbent)	**16,476**	**78.35**
Ely De La Cruz Ayao	2,485	11.82
Carmenlina Minasova	2,067	9.83
Total votes	**21,028**	**100.00**

=== District 8 ===
2024 Los Angeles City Council District 8 election
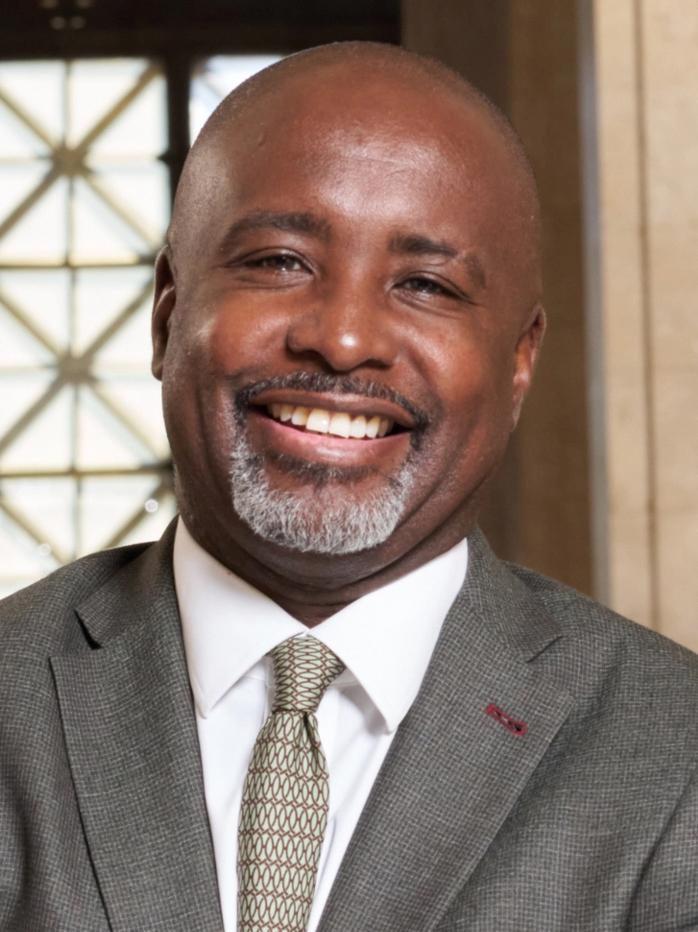

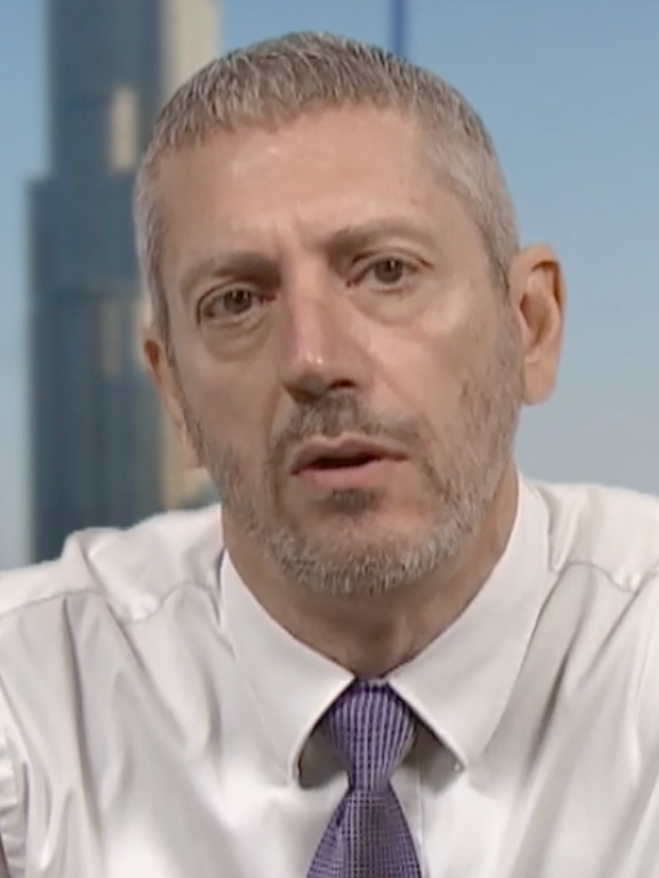

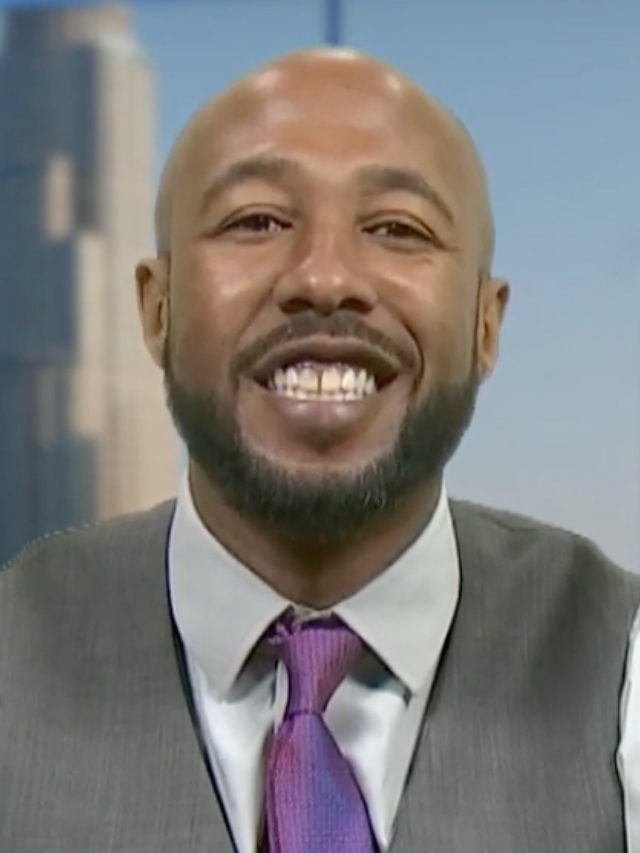
Candidate	Marqueece Harris-Dawson	Cliff Smith	Jahan Epps
Popular vote	19,569	3,617	1,771
Percentage	78.41%	14.49%	7.10%
City councilor before election
Marqueece Harris-Dawson
City councilor after election
Marqueece Harris-Dawson

The 8th district encompasses a large area of South Los Angeles, including West Adams, Hyde Park, Vermont Vista, Baldwin Hills and Adams-Normandie. The incumbent was Marqueece Harris-Dawson, who was re-elected unopposed in 2020. Harris-Dawson was first elected in 2015 and ran for re-election to a third term in office, to which he was re-elected in a landslide.

==== Candidates ====
===== Declared =====
- Marqueece Harris-Dawson, incumbent councilor
- Jahan Epps, business owner and real estate broker
- Cliff Smith, roofer and union community organizer

===== Endorsements =====
Marqueece Harris-Dawson

U.S. Representatives

- Sydney Kamlager-Dove, U.S. Representative for California's 37th district

Assemblymembers

- Isaac Bryan, California state assemblyman for the 55th district

County supervisors

- Holly Mitchell, Los Angeles County supervisor

Mayors

- Karen Bass, 43rd mayor of Los Angeles

Organizations

- Los Angeles County Federation of Labor

Newspapers

- Los Angeles Times

==== Results ====
2024 Los Angeles City Council District 8 election
Candidate	Votes	%
Marqueece Harris-Dawson (incumbent)	**19,569**	**78.40**
Cliff Smith	3,617	14.49
Jahan Epps	1,771	7.10
Total votes	**24,957**	**100.00**

=== District 10 ===
2024 Los Angeles City Council District 10 election
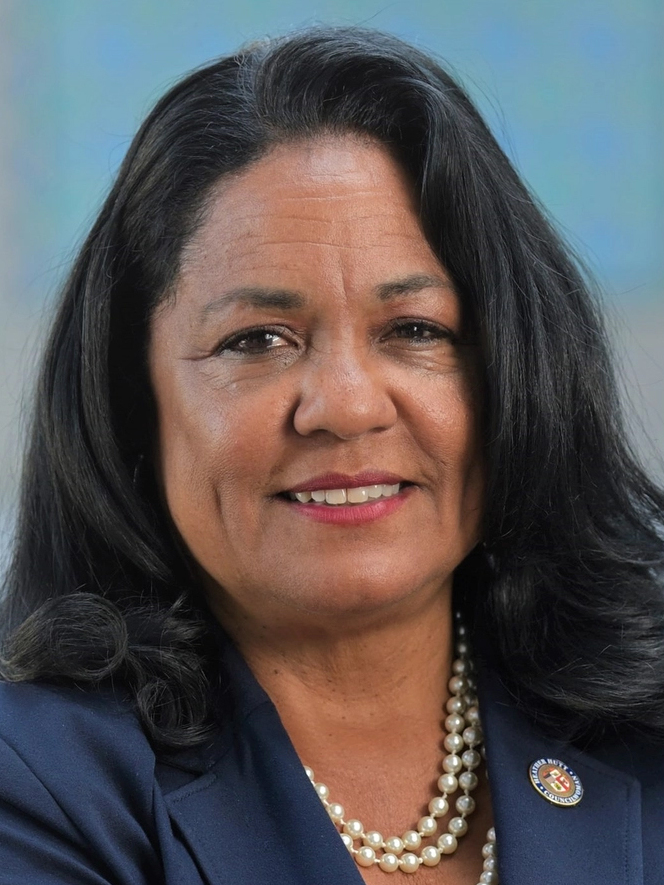

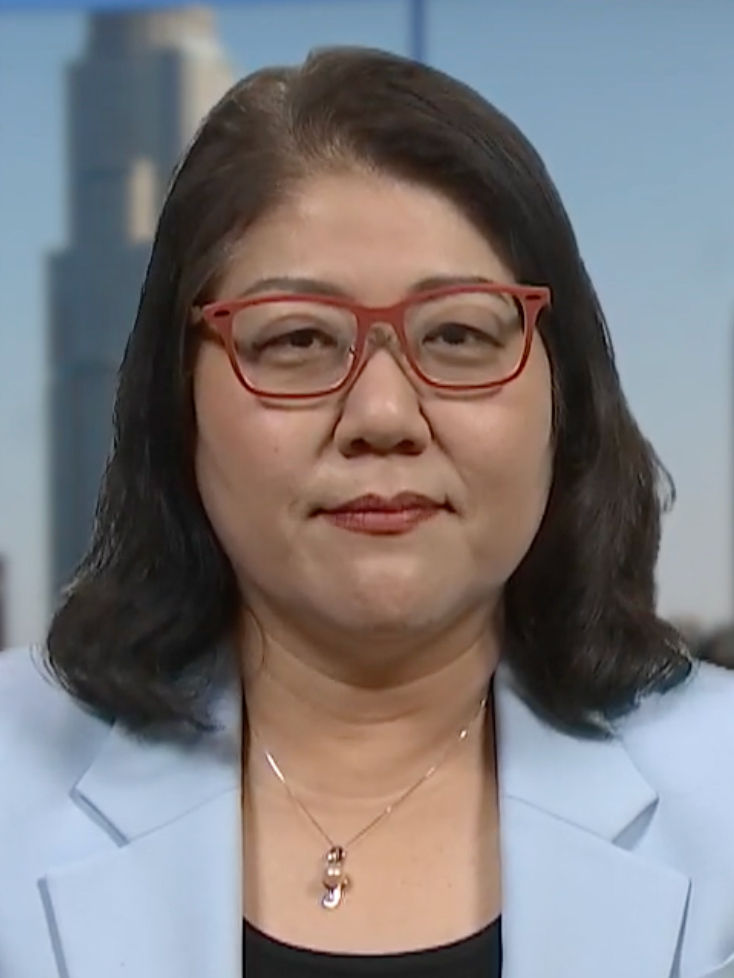

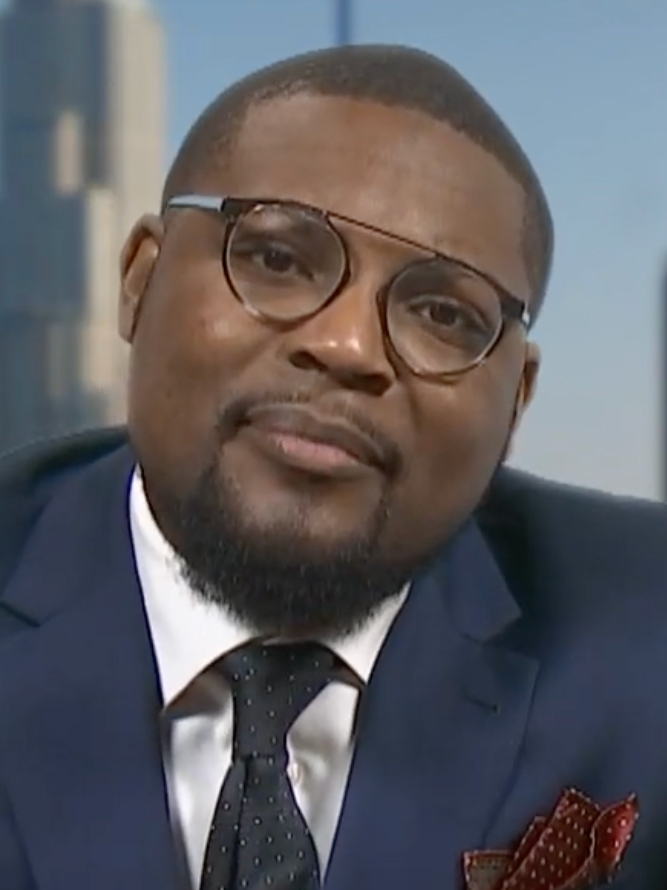

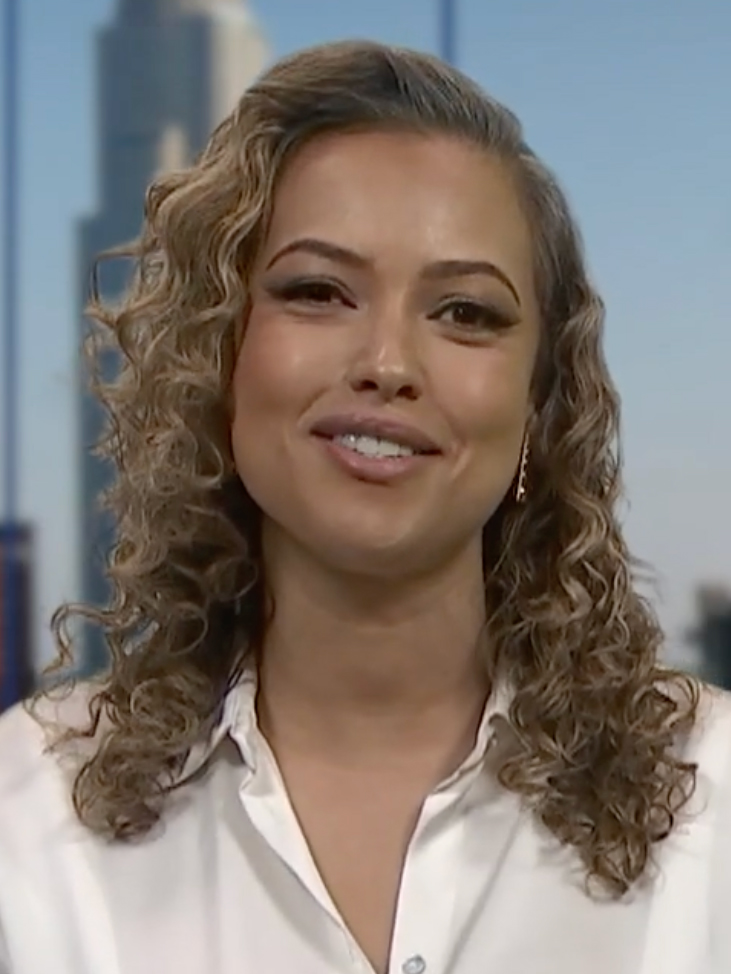

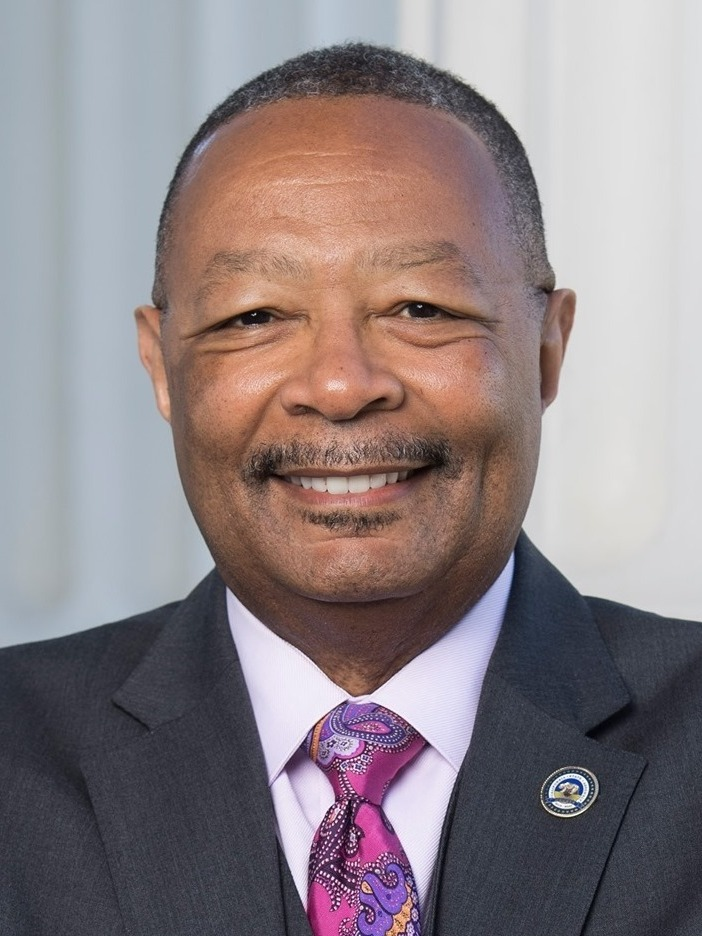
Candidate	Heather Hutt	Grace Yoo	Eddie Anderson
First round	13,499; 37.78%	8,257; 23.11%	6,846; 19.16%
Runoff	50,895; 62.81%	30,133; 37.19%	Eliminated
Candidate	Aura Vásquez	Reggie Jones-Sawyer
First round	5,006; 14.01%	2,119; 5.93%
Runoff	Eliminated	Eliminated
City councilor before election
Heather Hutt
City councilor after election
Heather Hutt

The 10th district encompasses Mid-City, Little Ethiopia, Leimert Park, La Cienega Heights, Baldwin Hills, Jefferson Park, Koreatown and Little Bangladesh. The incumbent was Heather Hutt, who was appointed to the seat in 2022 after the suspension of Mark Ridley-Thomas. Hutt is running for election to a full term in office. Hutt and attorney Grace Yoo advanced to the runoff.

==== Candidates ====
===== Declared =====
- Eddie Anderson, community organizer and progressive pastor
- Heather Hutt, appointed councilor
- Reggie Jones-Sawyer, California state assemblyman
- Aura Vasquez, former Los Angeles Department of Water and Power commissioner and candidate for this district in 2020
- Grace Yoo, attorney and runner-up for this district in 2020

===== Declined =====
- Isaac Bryan, California state assemblyman

==== Endorsements ====
Eddie Anderson

Organizations

- California Working Families Party
- Run for Something

Newspapers

- Los Angeles Times
Heather Hutt

Mayors

- Karen Bass, 43rd Mayor of Los Angeles

Individuals

- Melina Abdullah, academic and civic leader
Reggie Jones-Sawyer

State-level officials

- Rob Bonta, 34th Attorney General of California

U.S. Representatives

- Adam Schiff, U.S. Representative for the 30th district
Aura Vásquez

State legislators

- Richard Polanco, former California state senator
- Blanca Rubio, California state assemblywoman for the 48th district
Grace Yoo

U.S. Representatives

- Howard Berman, former U.S. Representative

Local politicians

- Laura Chick, 17th Los Angeles City Controller
- Jackie Goldberg, member of the LAUSD Board of Education

==== Results ====
2024 Los Angeles City Council District 10 election
Candidate	Votes	%
Heather Hutt (incumbent)	**13,499**	**37.78**
Grace Yoo	**8,257**	**23.11**
Eddie Anderson	6,846	19.16
Aura Vasquez	5,006	14.01
Reggie Jones-Sawyer	2,119	5.93
Total votes	**35,727**	**100.00**
General election
Heather Hutt (incumbent)	**50,895**	**62.81**
Grace Yoo	30,133	37.19
Total votes	**81,028**	**100.00**

=== District 12 ===
2024 Los Angeles City Council District 12 election
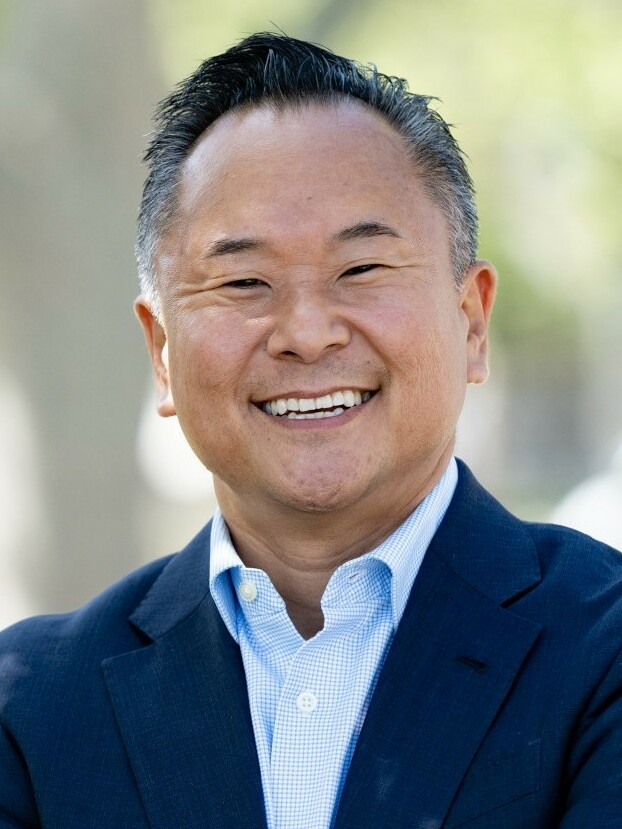

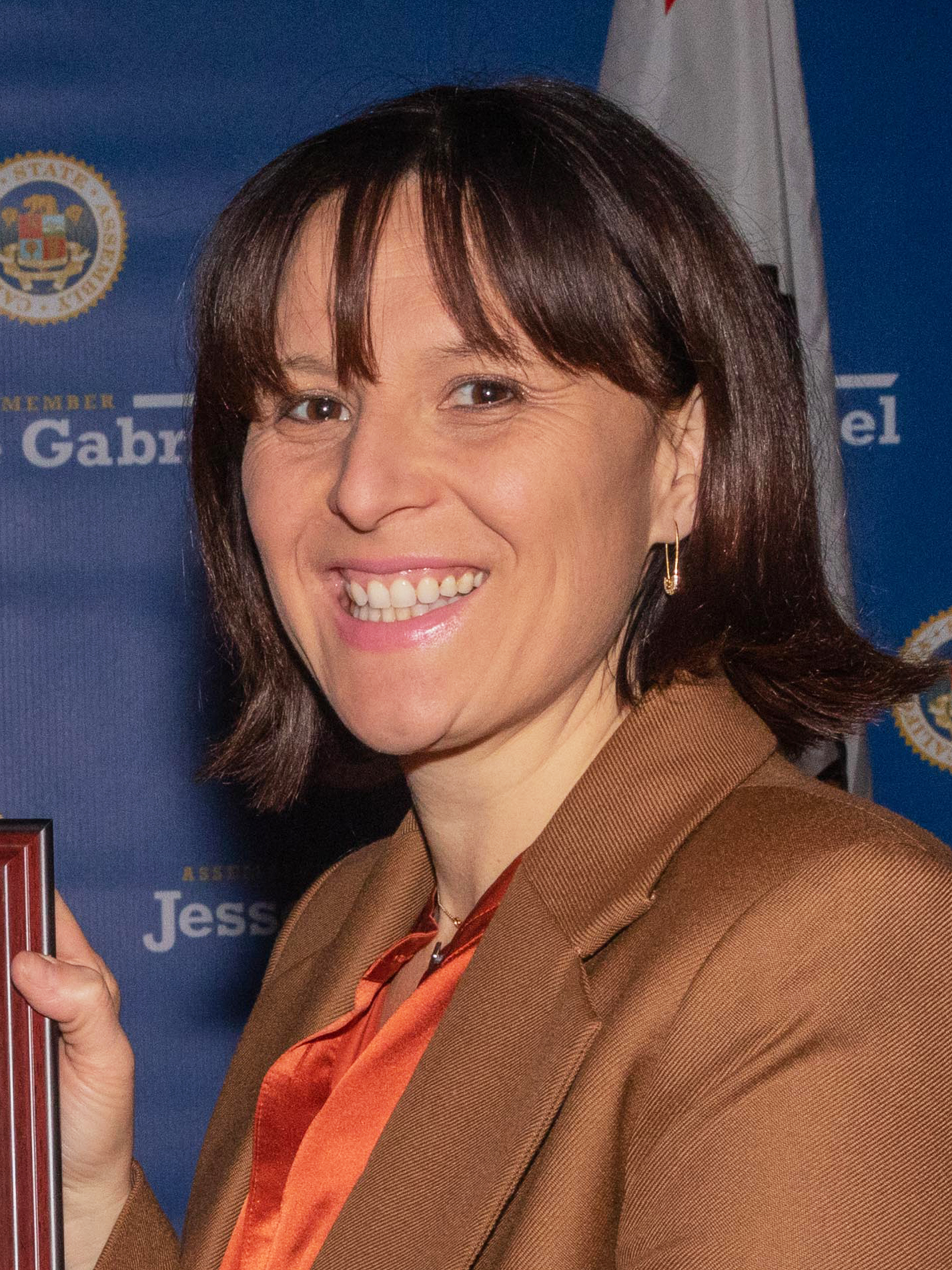
Candidate	John Lee	Serena Oberstein
Popular vote	33,574	20,314
Percentage	62.30%	37.70%
City councilor before election
John Lee
City councilor after election
John Lee

The 12th district encompasses San Fernando Valley, including Northridge, Chatsworth, Granada Hills, West Hills, Porter Ranch, Sherwood Forest, North Hills and Reseda. The incumbent was John Lee, who was re-elected with 50.6% of the vote in 2020. Lee ran for re-election to a third term in office, which he won in the election against Serena Oberstein.

==== Candidates ====
===== Declared =====
- John Lee, incumbent councilor
- Serena Oberstein, nonprofit leader

===== Endorsements =====
John Lee

Newspapers

- Los Angeles Daily News
Serena Oberstein

Newspapers

- Los Angeles Times

==== Results ====
2024 Los Angeles City Council District 12 election
Candidate	Votes	%
John Lee (incumbent)	**33,574**	**62.30**
Serena Oberstein	20,314	37.70
Total votes	**53,888**	**100.00**

=== District 14 ===
2024 Los Angeles City Council District 14 election
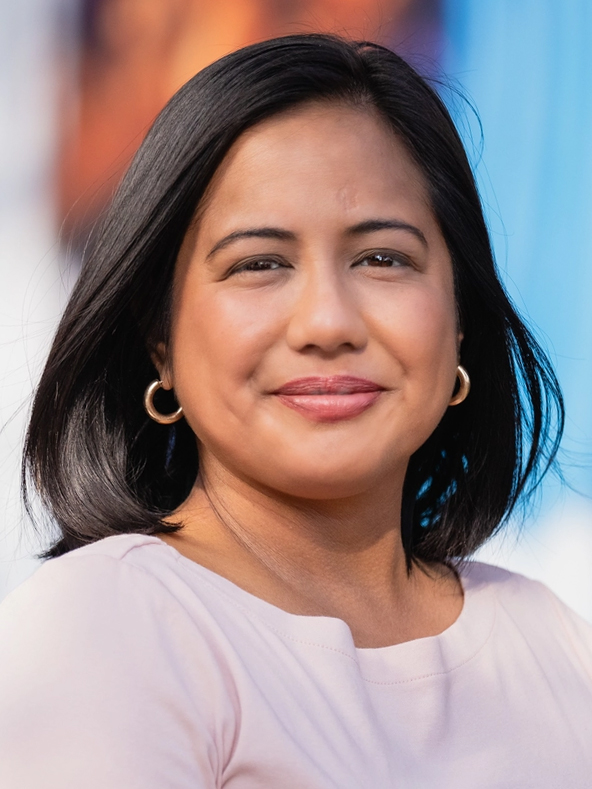

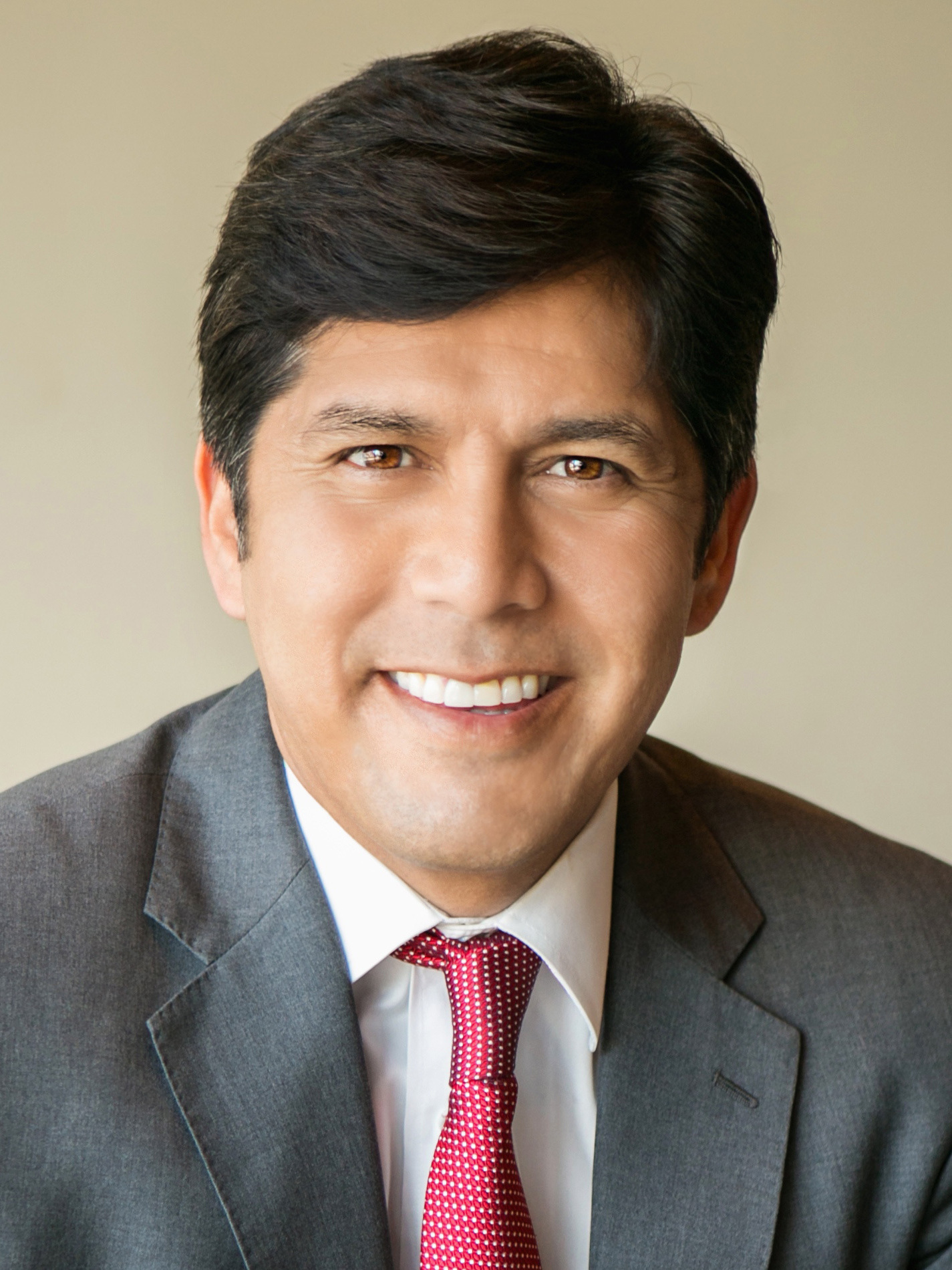

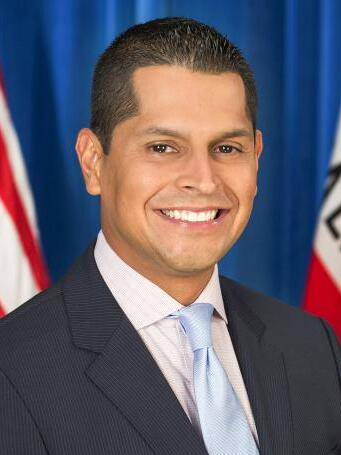

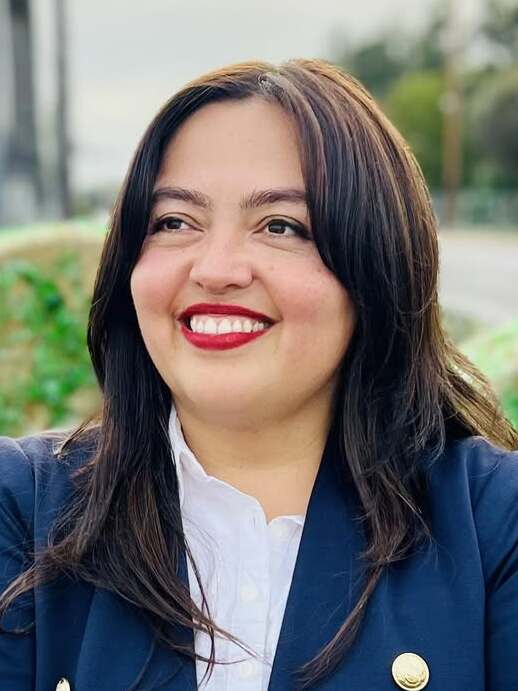
Candidate	Ysabel Jurado	Kevin de León
First round	8,618; 24.52%	8,220; 23.39%
Runoff	46,007; 57.17%	34,472; 42.83%
Candidate	Miguel Santiago	Wendy Carrillo
First round	7,470; 21.25%	5,321; 15.14%
Runoff	Eliminated	Eliminated
City councilor before election
Kevin de León
City councilor after election
Ysabel Jurado

The 14th district is situated in Downtown Los Angeles, including Skid Row, Boyle Heights, Lincoln Heights, Eagle Rock, El Sereno and Hermon. The incumbent was Kevin de León, who was first elected with 52.6% of the vote in 2020. de León is running for re-election to a second term in office after refusing to step down despite his involvement in the 2022 Los Angeles City Council scandal. Tenants rights attorney Ysabel Jurado defeated Assemblymembers Wendy Carrillo and Miguel Santiago to advance to the runoff, placing ahead of de León in the primary.

==== Candidates ====
===== Declared =====
- Wendy Carrillo, California state assemblywoman for the 52nd district
- Nadine Diaz, geriatric social worker
- Kevin de León, incumbent councilor
- Genny Guerrero, entrepreneur
- Teresa Hillery, L.A. County Bar Association leader
- Ysabel Jurado, tenants rights attorney
- Miguel Santiago, California state assemblyman for the 54th district
- Eduardo "Lalo" Vargas, teacher

===== Endorsements =====
Endorsements indicated in bold were made after the primary.

Wendy Carrillo

State-level officials

- Fiona Ma, 34th Treasurer of California

State assemblymembers

- Anthony Rendon, state assemblymember and 70th Speaker of the California State Assembly

Mayors

- Antonio Villaraigosa, 41st Mayor of Los Angeles
Ysabel Jurado

Local politicians

- Eunisses Hernandez, Los Angeles city councilor for the 1st district
- Jackie Goldberg, LAUSD Board of Education member for the 5th district

Newspapers and print media

- **Los Angeles Times**
Miguel Santiago

State assemblymembers

- Robert Rivas, state assemblymember and 71st Speaker of the California State Assembly

Organizations

- Abundant Housing LA

Newspapers

- Los Angeles Times
Eduardo "Lalo" Vargas

Political parties

- Party for Socialism and Liberation
- Peace and Freedom Party

==== Results ====
2024 Los Angeles City Council District 14 election
Candidate	Votes	%
Ysabel Jurado	**8,618**	**24.52**
Kevin de León (incumbent)	**8,220**	**23.39**
Miguel Santiago	7,470	21.25
Wendy Carrillo	5,321	15.14
Eduardo "Lalo" Vargas	1,638	4.66
Teresa Hillery	1,519	4.32
Genny Guerrero	1,457	4.15
Nadine Diaz	904	2.57
Total votes	**35,149**	**100.00**
General election
Ysabel Jurado	**46,007**	**57.17**
Kevin de León (incumbent)	34,472	42.83
Total votes	**80,479**	**100.00**

== LAUSD Board of Education ==
=== District 1 ===
The 1st district encompass an area that spans from Koreatown to Mid City, with sections in Westside Los Angeles and South Los Angeles by Baldwin Hills. The incumbent is George J. McKenna III, who was first elected in 2014 in a special election. In July 2023, McKenna announced that he would not be running for re-election.

==== Candidates ====
===== Declared =====
- Kahllid A. Al-Alim, janitorial worker
- John Aaron Brasfield, security staff member
- DeWayne Davis, education consultant and adjunct professor
- Christian Flagg, director of planning for Community Coalition
- Sherlett Hendy Newbill, aide to George McKenna
- Rina Tambor
- Didi L. Watts, aide to board member Tanya Ortiz Franklin

===== Endorsements =====
Kahllid A. Al-Alim

Labor unions

- ~~United Teachers Los Angeles~~
Sherlett Hendy Newbill

Newspapers

- Los Angeles Times

==== Results ====
2024 LAUSD Board of Education District 1 election
Candidate	Votes	%
Sherlett Hendy Newbill	20,926	25.73
Kahllid A. Al-Alim	16,382	20.14
Didi L. Watts	14,430	17.74
DeWayne Davis	13,263	16.31
Christian Flagg	6,601	8.12
Rina Tambor	6,458	7.94
John Aaron Brasfield	3,263	4.01
Total votes	81,320	100.00
General election
Sherlett Hendy Newbill	129,841	71.07
Kahllid A. Al-Alim	52,855	28.93
Total votes	182,696	100.00

=== District 3 ===
The 3rd district is in the San Fernando Valley, including North Hollywood, Sherman Oaks, and Van Nuys. The incumbent is Scott Schmerelson, who was first elected in 2014. Schmerelson is running for a third term.

==== Candidates ====
===== Declared =====
- Scott Schmerelson, incumbent board member
- Dan Chang, middle school math teacher
- Elizabeth Badger, auto repair shop owner
- Andreas Farmakalidis, part-owner of California MusicBox
- Raquel Villalta, teacher

===== Endorsements =====
Scott Schmerelson

Labor unions

- United Teachers Los Angeles

Newspapers

- Los Angeles Times
Dan Chang

Newspapers

- Los Angeles Daily News
- San Gabriel Valley Tribune

==== Results ====
2024 LAUSD Board of Education District 3 election
Candidate	Votes	%
Scott Schmerelson (incumbent)	50,669	44.55
Dan Chang	33,004	29.02
Raquel Villalta	13,632	11.99
Elizabeth Badger	9,287	8.17
Andreas Farmakalidis	7,131	6.27
Total votes	113,723	100.00
General election
Scott Schmerelson (incumbent)	124,331	51.63
Dan Chang	116,478	48.37
Total votes	240,809	100.00

=== District 5 ===
The 5th district encompasses an area in Northeast Los Angeles, including Eagle Rock, Glassell Park and Echo Park. It also includes the cities of Huntington Park, Maywood and South Gate. The incumbent is Jackie Goldberg, who was first elected in 2019 after the resignation of Ref Rodriguez. In August 2023, she announced that she would not be running for re-election.

==== Candidates ====
===== Declared =====
- Fidencio Gallardo, aide to Jackie Goldberg and adjunct professor
- Victorio R. Gutierrez, retired principal
- Karla Griego, community schools coordinator
- Graciela Ortiz, Huntington Park city councilor

===== Endorsements =====
Fidencio Gallardo

Newspapers

- Los Angeles Times
Karla Griego

Labor unions

- United Teachers Los Angeles

Organizations

- Los Angeles Democratic Socialists of America

==== Results ====
2024 LAUSD Board of Education District 5 election
Candidate	Votes	%
Karla Griego	24,065	36.72
Graciela Ortiz	18,845	28.75
Fidencio Gallardo	16,095	24.57
Victorio R. Gutierrez	6,524	9.96
Total votes	65,528	100.00
General election
Karla Griego	99,930	61.04
Graciela Ortiz	63,779	38.96
Total votes	163,709	100.00

=== District 7 ===
The 7th district encompasses South Los Angeles, including Gardena, Carson, San Pedro and Wilmington. The incumbent is Tanya Ortiz Franklin, who was first elected in 2020. Ortiz Franklin is running for a second term.

==== Candidates ====
===== Declared =====
- Tanya Ortiz Franklin, incumbent board member
- Lydia A. Gutiérrez, public school teacher

===== Endorsements =====
Tanya Ortiz Franklin

Newspapers

- Los Angeles Times

==== Results ====
2024 LAUSD Board of Education District 7 election
Candidate	Votes	%
Tanya Ortiz Franklin (incumbent)	34,380	55.91
Lydia A. Gutiérrez	27,112	44.09
Total votes	61,492	100.00

== Ballot measures ==
=== Measure HLA ===
Measure HLA

Results
Choice	Votes	%
Yes	362,706	65.50%
No	191,020	34.50%
Total votes	553,726	100.00%
Registered voters/turnout	2,130,581	25.99%

Yes
50–60%
60–70%
70–80%
80–90%
>90%
No
50–60%
60–70%

Healthy Streets LA, on the ballot as Measure HLA, mandates the city to implement its 2015 mobility plan – including pedestrian- and cyclist-oriented improvements to many major streets in the city – whenever the City undertakes "any paving project or other modification of at least one-eighth (1/8) of a mile", applying to both public streets and sidewalks. A report released by Chief Administrative Officer Matt Szabo in February 2024 indicated that the ballot measure would cost $3.1 billion to implement, which HLA supporters called a politicized move. The ballot measure passed by a wide margin.

==== Endorsements ====
Yes (for Measure HLA)

Local politicians

- Eunisses Hernandez, Los Angeles city councilor for the 1st district
- Nithya Raman, Los Angeles city councilor for the 4th district
- Katy Yaroslavsky, Los Angeles city councilor for the 5th district
- Marqueece Harris-Dawson, Los Angeles city councilor for the 8th district
- Heather Hutt, Los Angeles city councilor for the 10th district
- Hugo Soto-Martinez, Los Angeles city councilor for the 13th district

Organizations

- Sierra Club
- Streets for All

Newspapers and other media

- Los Angeles Times
No (against Measure HLA)

Newspapers and other media

- Los Angeles Daily News

==== Aftermath ====
The mandate took effect in April 2024. A lawsuit was filed a year later, alleging that in the summer of 2024 the city repaved a section of Vermont Avenue without installing bicycle lanes.

The city council and mayor approved an ordinance in the summer of 2025 to expand upon the text of the measure; among other things, the ordinance required any constituent who seeks relief under Measure HLA to first submit to an internal appeal process with the city before being able to file any litigation.

The city's Department of Public Works abruptly stopped resurfacing streets in July 2025, having previously resurfaced hundreds of miles of streets every year. Instead, the Department shifted to "large asphalt repair", a term apparently of its own coinage, which the Department claims is distinct from resurfacing and therefore does not trigger street improvements required either by Measure HLA or the Americans with Disabilities Act.

In late 2025, the Department began to hear internal appeals and rejected most of them.
