= 2023 Los Angeles special election =

- April 4, 2023 (first round); June 27, 2023 (runoff)

1 out of 15 seats in the City Council 8 seats needed for a majority
	Majority party	Minority party
Party	Democratic	Independent
Seats before	13	1
Seats won	1	0
Seats after	14	1
Seat change	▲1	Steady

The 2023 Los Angeles special election was held on April 4, 2023, with a runoff occurring on June 27, 2023. Voters will elect a candidate in a nonpartisan primary, with runoff elections potentially scheduled. One of the fifteen seats on the Los Angeles City Council was up for election due to the vacancy of one member, councilwoman Nury Martinez of District 6, who resigned in the wake of the 2022 Los Angeles City Council scandal. Sharon Tso was installed as a caretaker to the district, but no formal appointment was made. There was potential for a recall over Kevin de León's statements made during the 2022 Los Angeles City Council scandal as well, though due to the lack of signatures turned in by the deadline on April 1, 2023, the petition to recall de León failed. Former City Attorney Mike Feuer also proposed that a special election be held on a referendum to replace the council's ability to redraw the City Council districts with an independent commission before the 2024 elections.

Municipal elections in California are officially nonpartisan, and candidates' party affiliations do not appear on the ballot.

== District 6 ==
2023 Los Angeles City Council District 6 special election
- April 4, 2023 (First round); June 27, 2023 (Runoff)
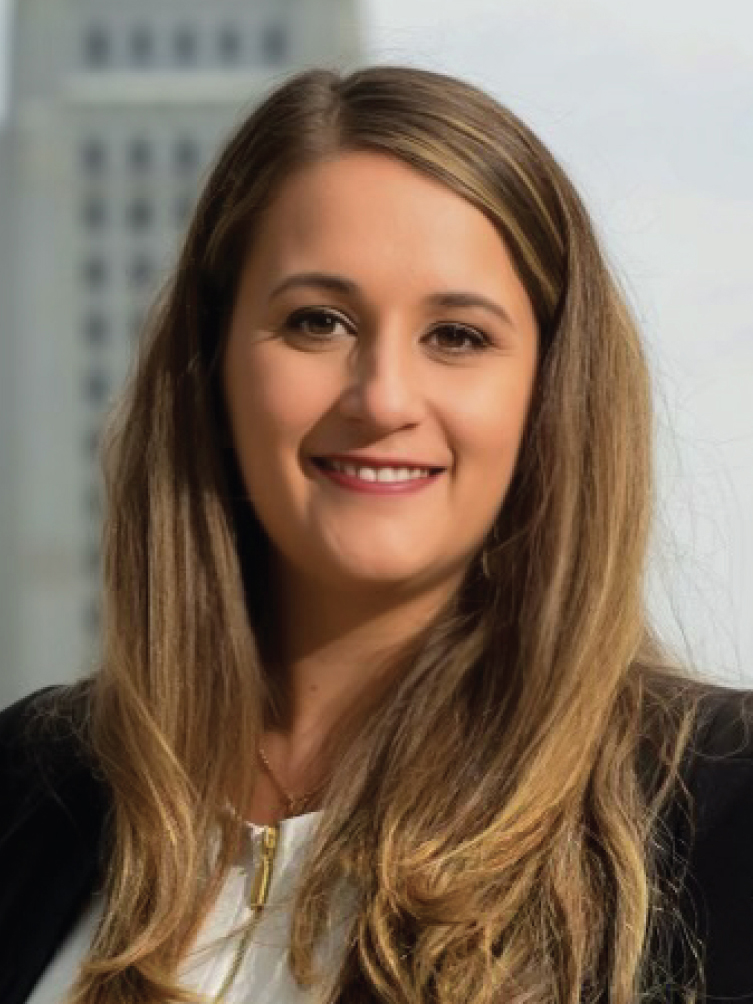

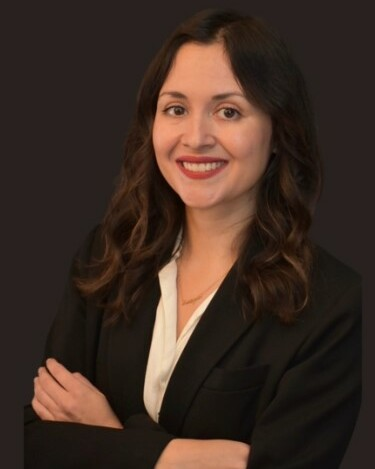

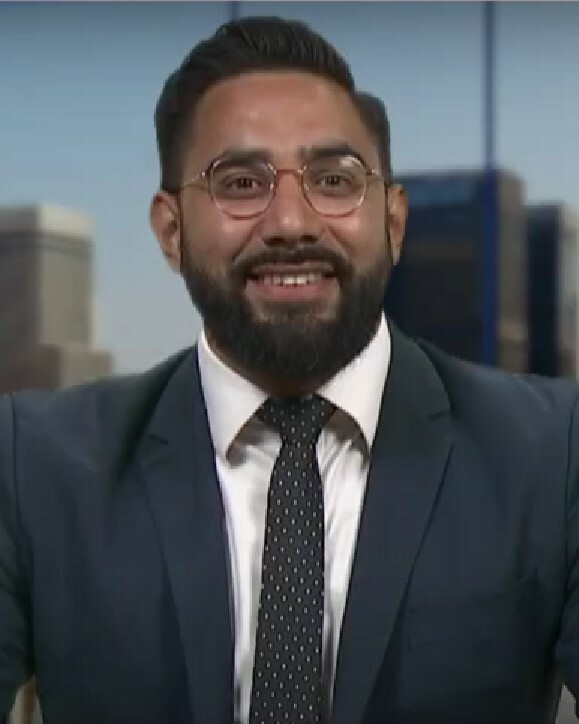

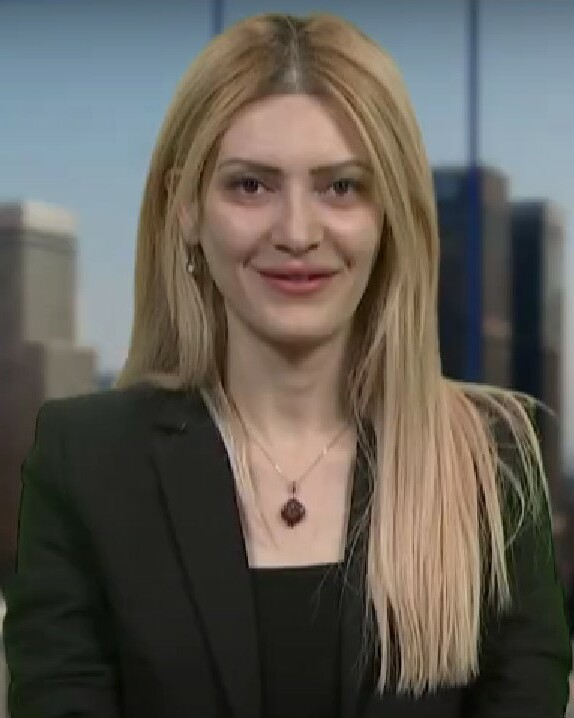

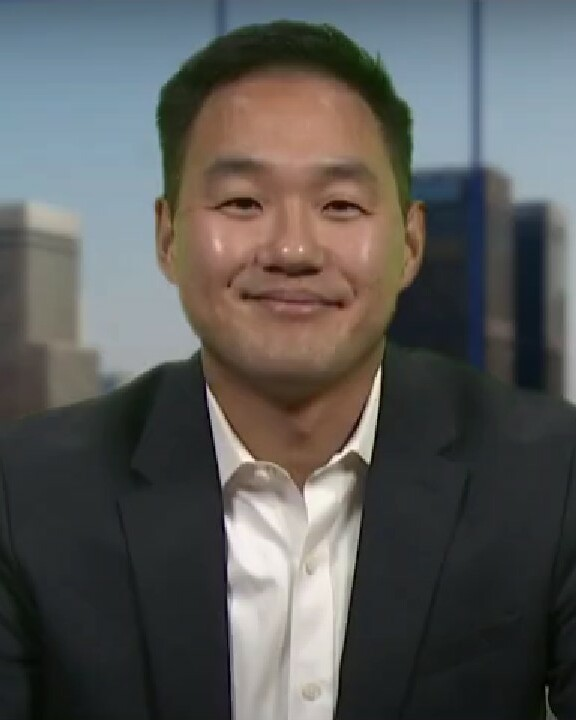

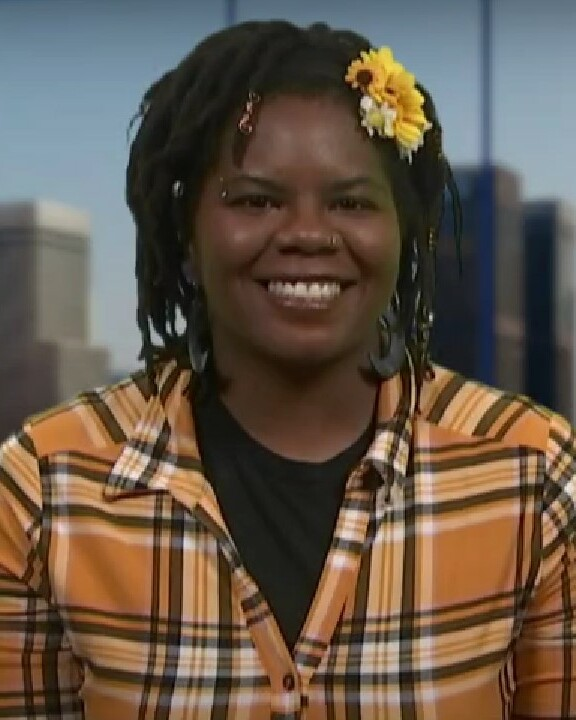
Candidate	Imelda Padilla	Marisa Alcaraz	Marco Santana
First round	3,421; 25.69%	2,812; 21.12%	2,515; 18.89%
Runoff	8,520; 55.79%	6,751; 44.21%	Eliminated
Candidate	Rose Grigoryan	Isaac Kim	Antoinette Scully
First round	1,980; 14.87%	1,452; 10.90%	744; 5.59%
Runoff	Eliminated	Eliminated	Eliminated
City Councilor before election
Vacant (Note: After the resignation of Nury Martinez, Los Angeles Chief Legislative Analyst Sharon Tso acted as a nonvoting placeholder. Tso's only responsibilities were to maintain the day-to-day operations of the 6th district council office, and the seat was still considered vacant.)
City Councilor
Imelda Padilla

The 6th district includes the neighborhoods of Lake Balboa, Van Nuys, Panorama City, Arleta, North Hills, North Hollywood, and Sun Valley, as well as Van Nuys Airport and the Sepulveda Basin.

Although the election was officially nonpartisan, all qualified candidates were members of the Democratic Party except Rose Grigoryan, who was registered as "no party preference."

=== Candidates ===
==== Declared ====
- Marisa Alcaraz, deputy chief of staff to city councilor Curren Price from Lake Balboa
- Rose Grigoryan, marketing company founder from North Hollywood
- Isaac Kim, skin care business owner from Van Nuys
- Imelda Padilla, community relations manager and candidate for Los Angeles Unified School District Board of Education in 2017 from Sun Valley
- Marco Santana, housing nonprofit director and former Controller of the San Fernando Valley Democratic Party from Van Nuys
- Antoinette Scully, community organizer from Van Nuys
- Douglas Sierra, community center facilities coordinator from Sun Valley

==== Qualified write-in candidates ====
- Wendy Goodman Thum, president of the Sun Valley Neighborhood Council
- Carmelina Minasova, respiratory therapist
- Richard Serrano, Los Angeles Department of Water and Power employee

==== Disqualified ====
- Lanira Murphy, treasurer of the Panorama City Neighborhood Council and runner-up for California State Assembly District 46 in 2020
- James Thomas, president of the San Fernando Valley NAACP

==== Declined ====
- Angélica Dueñas, member of the Los Angeles County Democratic Party Central Committee, former president of the Sun Valley Neighborhood Council, and candidate for California's 29th congressional district in 2018, 2020, and 2022
- Kelly Gonez, president of the Los Angeles Board of Education (endorsed Santana)
- Cindy Montañez, San Fernando city councilor, former state assemblywoman from the 39th district, and candidate for this district in 2013 and 2015
- Luz Rivas, state assemblywoman from the 39th district
- Sharon Tso, Los Angeles Chief Legislative Analyst and nonvoting placeholder for this seat

=== Endorsements ===
Imelda Padilla

Federal politicians

- Tony Cárdenas, U.S. representative for California's 29th congressional district

Local politicians

- George McKenna, member of the Los Angeles Board of Education
- Rocio Rivas, member of the Los Angeles Board of Education
- Joy Picus, former Los Angeles city councilor
- Monica Rodriguez, Los Angeles city councilor
- Scott Schmerelson, member of the Los Angeles Board of Education

Labor unions

- Laborers' Union Local 300
Marisa Alcaraz

State legislators

- Wendy Carrillo, California state assemblywoman

Local politicians

- Heather Hutt, Los Angeles city councilor
- Curren Price, Los Angeles city councilor (Alcaraz currently works for Price)

Labor unions

- International Longshore and Warehouse Union Local 94
- Unite Here Local 11
- Southwest Mountain States Regional Council of Carpenters
- United Food and Commercial Workers International Union Local 770
Marco Santana

Local politicians

- Kelly Gonez, president of the Los Angeles Board of Education
- Nithya Raman, Los Angeles city councilor

Newspapers

- Los Angeles Times

Labor unions

- International Union of Painters and Allied Trades District Council 36

Organizations

- Los Angeles League of Conservation Voters
- San Fernando Valley Democratic Party
Isaac Kim

Organizations

- Sunrise Movement Occidental
Antoinette Scully

Organizations

- Indivisible East Valley
Douglas Sierra

Newspapers

- Los Angeles Daily News
Declined to endorse

Organizations

- Ground Game Los Angeles
- Los Angeles Democratic Socialists of America
- Sunrise Movement Los Angeles

=== Fundraising ===
Campaign finance reports as of February 18, 2023
Candidate	Contributions
Marisa Alcaraz	$100,606
Rose Grigoryan	$23,379
Isaac Kim	$13,275
Imelda Padilla	$55,362
Marco Santana	$53,900
Antoinette Scully	$5,688
Douglas Sierra	$8,113

=== Political positions ===
Candidate	Eliminate parking minimums	Increase upzoning (Note: Altering the zoning of certain areas to allow for the construction higher-density housing) in District 6	Refuse donations from real estate and police interests	Support Healthy Streets LA (Note: An initiative on the 2024 ballot to make Los Angeles streets safer by increasing the number of dedicated bus lanes, protected bike lanes, and pedestrian-priority areas. Nury Martinez, the seat's previous incumbent, opposed Healthy Streets LA.)	Close Whiteman Airport (Note: Some have called to close Whiteman Airport due to concerns over pollution and recent plane crashes.)	Police staffing level	Reallocate police funding (Note: Take funds from the police budget and use them to finance mental health and homelessness outreach programs)	Repeal Section 41.18 (Note: A section of the Los Angeles Municipal Code that "prohibits sitting, lying, sleeping, and storing property in many public areas," functioning to limit public homeless camping.)
Marisa Alcaraz	No	Yes	Yes	Yes	Possibly (Note: "If the community seriously feels the airport needs to be closed, that's something we should seriously consider.")	Increase	?	No
Rose Grigoryan	?	?	?	?	?	?	?	?
Isaac Kim	No	Yes	Yes	Yes	No	Status quo	Yes	Yes
Imelda Padilla	Partially (Note: Would eliminate parking minimums for housing built "near public transit")	Yes	No	Yes	No	Increase	No	No
Marco Santana	No	Yes	Yes	Yes	Yes	Increase	Yes	Yes
Antoinette Scully	Yes	Yes	Yes	Yes	Yes	Decrease	Yes	Yes
Douglas Sierra	Yes	Yes	Yes	Yes	Possibly (Note: Would convene neighborhood councils of nearby areas to decide whether or not to close the airport.)	Increase	No (Note: Would audit LAPD to find ways to save money, but would not cut police funding)	Possibly (Note: Would not enforce 41.18 without adequate housing)

=== General election ===
2023 Los Angeles City Council district 6 special election
Candidate	Votes	%
Imelda Padilla	3,424	25.66
Marisa Alcaraz	2,819	21.13
Marco Santana	2,523	18.91
Rose Grigoryan	1,985	14.88
Isaac Kim	1,455	10.90
Antoinette Scully	745	5.58
Douglas Sierra	393	2.95
Write-in	162	1.23
Total votes	13,506	100.00
Imelda Padilla	8,520	55.79
Marisa Alcaraz	6,751	44.21
Total votes	15,271	100.00

== District 14 recall attempt ==
Kevin de León's recall was first introduced in October 2022, in the midst of the 2022 Los Angeles City Council scandal. The recall petition was approved by the city clerk office on December 6, 2022. The petition failed on April 1, 2023, as only 21,006 of the required 25,000 valid signatures were turned in.

=== Polling ===
Hypothetical polling

Should Kevin de León be recalled?

Poll source	Date(s) administered	Sample size	Margin of error	Yes	No	Undecided
Strategies 360	January 10–16, 2023	400 (RV)	± 4.9%	58%	25%	17%
