= Ysabel Jurado =

American lawyer and politician

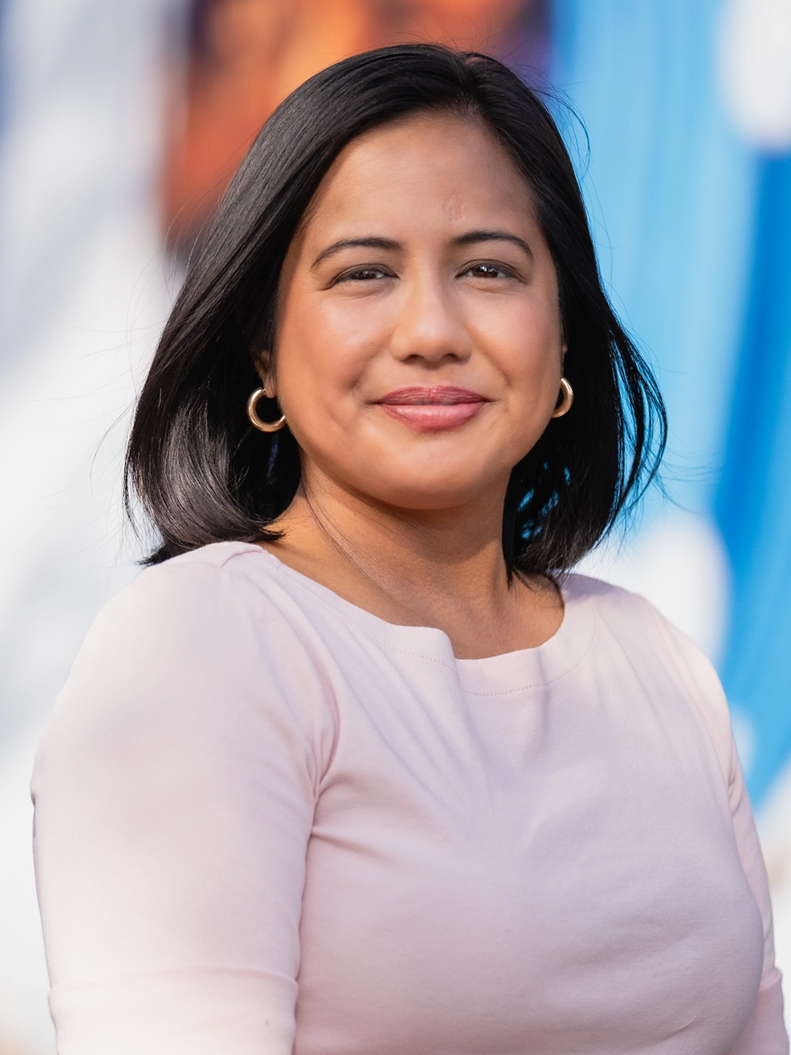
- Official portrait, 2025

Member of the Los Angeles City Council from the 14th district
- Incumbent
- Assumed office December 9, 2024
- Preceded by: Kevin de León

Personal details
- Born: Los Angeles, California, U.S.
- Party: Democratic
- Other political affiliations: Democratic Socialists of America
- Education: University of California, Los Angeles (BA, JD)

Ysabel J. Jurado is an American politician who is a member of the Los Angeles City Council for the 14th district. A member of the Democratic Party and the Democratic Socialists of America, Jurado defeated incumbent Kevin de León the 2024 general election, becoming the first person of Filipino descent elected to the City Council. Her victory was largely attributed to de León's role in the 2022 Los Angeles City Council scandal.

== Early life and education ==
Jurado was born and raised in Highland Park, Los Angeles, to Carlo Jurado, a DJ, and Jocelyn Jurado. Both of her parents were undocumented. She has one brother, Raphael. Her grandmother, Irene Jurado, was a lawyer in Iligan, Philippines, serving as lead counsel for The Evening Post. At age 17, Jurado became a mother and co-parented with her aunt while working. She attended the University of California, Los Angeles, where she earned a Bachelor of Arts degree and a Juris Doctor. She then pursued a career as a housing rights attorney, where she focused on defending workers facing wage theft and representing tenants in eviction cases.

== Political career ==
In 2023, Jurado launched her campaign for Los Angeles City Council in the 2024 election, targeting the seat held by Kevin de León, inspired by the elections of Nithya Raman, Eunisses Hernandez, and Hugo Soto-Martinez. De León had faced significant public backlash due to his involvement in a 2022 political scandal, where he, along with council members Nury Martinez and Gil Cedillo, was recorded making racist and disparaging remarks. In the 2024 primary election, Jurado led de León and California State Assemblymembers Wendy Carrillo and Miguel Santiago. In the runoff election, Jurado led de León in early returns and declared victory days later.

Jurado's deputy for economic innovation and community growth, Luz Aguilar, was arrested on June 8, 2025 during a protest against ICE activity in Downtown Los Angeles, on suspicion of assaulting a police officer. Jurado described the allegations as “deeply concerning” and placed Aguilar on unpaid leave.

In 2025, Jurado voted in opposition to Senate Bill 79 which allows six-story buildings near light rail stations and rapid bus stops across California. She also voted against a City Council proposal to place a measure on the ballot that would exempt new apartment constructions from the city's Measure ULA real estate transfer tax ("mansion tax"). Jurado defended the tax as a vital funding stream for tenant protections and affordable housing subsidies, opposing the modifications despite empirical academic studies from institutions like UCLA indicating that the tax's flat threshold suppressed multifamily property sales and disincentivized new housing permits across the city.

== Electoral history ==
Electoral history of Jackie Goldberg
Year	Office		Party	Primary			General			Result	Swing	Ref.
Year	Office		Party	Total	%	P.	Total	%	P.	Result	Swing	Ref.
2024	Los Angeles City Council	14th	Nonpartisan	8,618	24.52%	1st	46,007	57.17%	1st	Won	N/A	
