= Kelly Gonez =

American politician

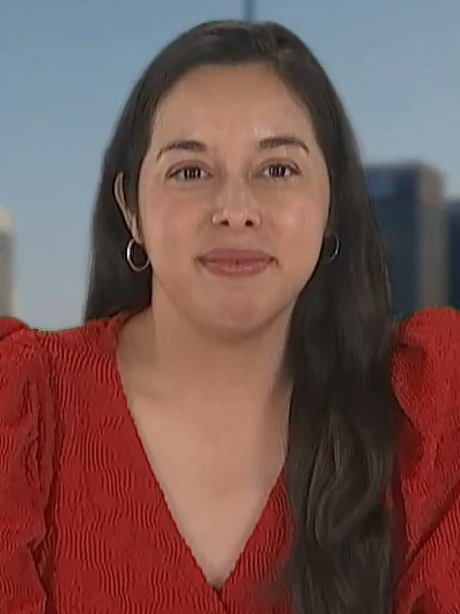
- Gonez in 2026

Member of the LAUSD Board of Education from the 6th district
- Incumbent
- Assumed office May 16, 2017
- Preceded by: Mónica Ratliff

President of the LAUSD Board of Education
- In office December 15, 2020 – January 17, 2023
- Preceded by: Richard Vladovic
- Succeeded by: Jackie Goldberg

Personal details
- Born: 1988 (age 37–38) Mission Hills, Los Angeles
- Spouse: Manuel Gonez
- Children: 3
- Education: University of California, Berkeley (BA); Loyola Marymount University (MA)

Kelly Fitzpatrick-Gonez (born 1988) is a former science teacher and current member and former president of the Los Angeles Unified School District Board of Education. She was elected as a board member in 2017 and as president in 2020. Prior to her election, she had previously served as an education policy advisor for the Obama administration.

== Early life and education ==
Gonez was born in 1988 to an immigrant family in Mission Hills. She attended St. Euphrasia Catholic School in Granada Hills for elementary and middle school and graduated from Bishop Alemany High School in 2006. She was the first in her family to attend college, graduating from University of California, Berkeley with an undergraduate degree in political science and history and later Loyola Marymount University with a master's degree in urban education.

== Career ==
Gonez first taught geometry at an LAUSD high school, later becoming a 6th-grade science teacher from Lake View Terrace. In 2014, Gonez was appointed by then-President Barack Obama to serve as an education policy advisor. As an advisor, she secured over $50 million in additional education funding and led the administration to increase education funding and support for special populations. The Obama administration later endorsed Gonez for the board.

On October 18, 2016, Gonez announced that she would be running for the District 6 seat in the Board of Education. She won against Imelda Padilla on May 17, 2017. In 2020, she was elected by her colleagues to become the president of the Board of Education, becoming the youngest woman president in the history of the board to become one at 32. Her election, along with Nick Melvoin as vice president, signified a shift toward more influence for backers of charter schools, as both members were supported by pro-charter donors. In 2023, the Board voted to make Jackie Goldberg the president, replacing Gonez.

== Personal life ==
Gonez is married to Manuel Gonez, a policy director for the nonprofit TreePeople. They reside in North Hollywood and have three children. In 2024, he ran for the Los Angeles City Council's 2nd district, where he placed fourth in the primary.

== Electoral history ==
2017 LAUSD Board of Education District 6 election
Primary election
Candidate	Votes	%
Kelly Gonez	15,984	37.16
Imelda Padilla	13,390	31.13
Patty López	5,159	11.99
Araz Parseghian	3,853	8.96
Gwendolyn Posey	2,483	5.77
Jose Sandoval	2,149	5.00
Total votes	43,018	100.00
General election
Kelly Gonez	16,961	51.46
Imelda Padilla	15,996	48.54
Total votes	32,957	100.00

2022 LAUSD Board of Education District 6 election
Primary election
Candidate	Votes	%
Kelly Gonez (incumbent)	32,702	47.72
Marvin Rodriguez	21,495	31.37
Jesus Arana	14,334	20.92
Total votes	68,531	100.00
General election
Kelly Gonez (incumbent)	51,707	51.27
Marvin Rodriguez	49,151	48.73
Total votes	100,858	100.00

2026 LAUSD Board of Education District 6 election
Candidate	Votes	%
Kelly Gonez	82,226	100.00
Total votes	82,226	100.00
