= Hugo Soto-Martinez =

American labor organizer and politician

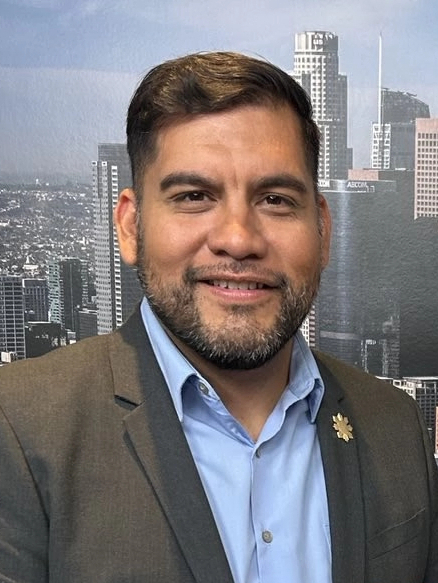
- Soto-Martinez in 2024

Member of the Los Angeles City Council from the 13th district
- Incumbent
- Assumed office December 12, 2022
- Preceded by: Mitch O'Farrell

Personal details
- Born: Los Angeles, California, U.S.
- Party: Democratic
- Education: University of California, Irvine (BA)
- Soto-Martinez's voice Soto-Martinez on joining a labor union. Recorded June 7, 2023

Hugo Soto-Martinez is an American labor union organizer and politician, currently serving as a member of the Los Angeles City Council for the 13th district since 2022. A member of the Democratic Party and the Democratic Socialists of America, Soto-Martinez defeated incumbent Mitch O'Farrell in the 2022 general election.

== Early life and career ==
Soto-Martinez was born and raised in South Central Los Angeles to two Mexican immigrant parents who worked as street vendors. When Soto-Martinez was 14, his father suffered from a back injury that made him disabled and unable to work. He consequently dropped out of high school and started working at a hotel at the age of 16 to help his family.

During that time, Soto-Martinez and his older brother were detained by police at a public phone booth. Soto-Martinez claimed he and his brother were attempting to use the payphone after the family's phone service had been cut off. Soto-Martinez told Jacobin that he "simply asked what [the charge was] when I didn't do anything wrong. So [the police officer] put his arm around me, squeezed my neck, and reminded me I was in a place where there’s a lot of drug violence, as if to imply I was misbehaving by just being there." Soto-Martinez received a ticket for littering as a result of the incident, which he contested. Soon after, Soto-Martinez and his friend were caught in an "entrapment operation." According to Jacobin, "police placed trains with cargo on tracks in their neighborhood, and he and a friend stopped by to check it out." Soto-Martinez was placed on probation.

He studied political science and criminology at University of California, Irvine in 2001 while still working at the hotel. In 2006, his last year of college, a co-worker asked if he would join a trade union they were organizing which he did, winning fair wages and free family healthcare.

After graduating from the University of California, Irvine, he became an organizer for UNITE HERE Local 11 and involved with the Los Angeles chapter of the Democratic Socialists of America. He canvassed for politicians like Barack Obama, against Joe Arpaio, and helped flip the two Georgia Senate seats with Stacey Abrams. He organized against the criminalization of Los Angeles' immigrant street vendors, and worked against the proliferation of deputy gangs inside the Los Angeles Sheriff's Department.

In 2020, he was designated by his union to be the labor liaison on Measure J, a ballot initiative to allocate at least 10% of Los Angeles County's funding for community reinvestment and incarceration alternatives. The initiative's campaign was co-chaired by future Assemblymember Isaac Bryan and future councilmember Eunisses Hernandez and passed with 57.12% of the vote.

In June 2021, the measure was temporarily blocked by Los Angeles County Superior Court Judge Mary Strobel, who ruled that Measure J was unconstitutional and violated California law by infringing on the County Board of Supervisors' authority to set budgets; in 2023, however, the California Court of Appeals reversed this ruling, allowing the measure to take effect.

== Political career ==
=== Los Angeles City Council ===
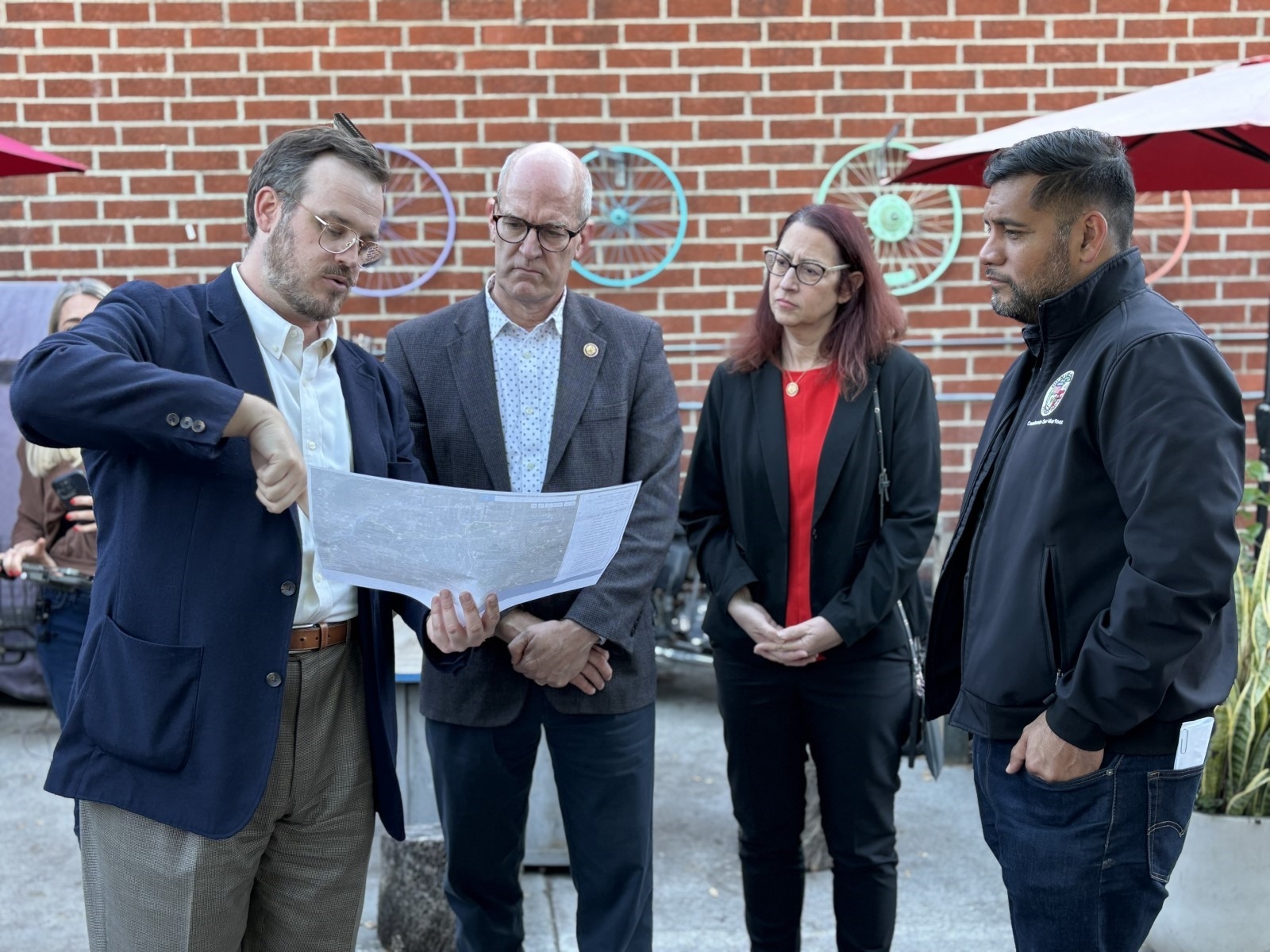
Soto-Martinez with Representatives Rick Larsen and Laura Friedman, 2025.

In June 2021, Soto-Martinez announced that he was running in the 2022 Los Angeles elections in District 13 against incumbent Mitch O'Farrell. Soto-Martinez criticized O'Farrell's handling of Echo Park's homeless population as well as his policies towards police budget and housing development within the district. In the primary, Soto-Martinez led O'Farrell by nine points, with the pair going into a runoff. In the general election, Soto-Martinez ousted O'Farrell with 57.24% of the vote. He was sworn into office on December 12, 2022.

As the only renter on City Council, Soto-Martinez pushed to expand tenant protections ahead of the expiration of Los Angeles' eviction moratorium that was instituted during the COVID-19 pandemic. Ultimately, the City Council passed universal just cause for evictions, a monetary threshold for nonpayment evictions, and relocation assistance for those displaced by rising rents. The instituted protections were described as a "monumental win" for renters, who make up over 60% of Los Angeles' population. Soto-Martinez later joined other councilmembers in introducing a proposal that would give tenants the right to a lawyer when facing eviction by implementing a similar program that has limited wrongful evictions in New York and San Francisco.

In early February 2023, news leaked that a staffer of Soto-Martinez had requested extra overnight patrol for his Lexus. LAPD launched an investigation into the leak of confidential information. In February 2023, Soto-Martinez introduced a motion with Councilmember Tim McOsker to reform the LAPD disciplinary system by making it easier to suspend or fire officers accused of severe misconduct.

On February 2, 2023, Soto-Martinez announced plans to remove the fence surrounding Echo Park Lake, which was erected following the 2021 police sweep of homeless encampments in the park where numerous protestors and observers were arrested or detained, including 16 journalists. The fence had long divided the community, with some residents expressing safety concerns and advocating for a permanent fence, while others remained eager for the park to be more accessible. In March 2023, workers removed the fence surrounding the park. Despite previously expressed concerns, no major issues at the park were reported in the following months, leading to praise from community members, City Council colleagues, and Mayor Karen Bass.

In March 2023, Soto-Martinez introduced a motion with Councilmembers Eunisses Hernandez and Nithya Raman to make Los Angeles a sanctuary city. The motion would codify existing policies, including a 2017 executive directive issued by then-Mayor Eric Garcetti that prohibits all city employees from using public facilities or resources to assist or cooperate with federal civil immigration enforcement.

In June 2023, during a protest led by UNITE HERE Local 11, the LAPD arrested Soto-Martinez after he refused to disperse. The protest was held after two months of contract negotiations between the union and local hotels, with workers seeking higher wages and healthcare benefits. Soto-Martinez issued a statement saying the act of civil disobedience aimed to bring attention to working people and single mothers working multiple jobs.

In August 2023, Soto-Martinez, Nithya Raman and Eunisses Hernandez voted against a four-year package of raises and bonuses for rank-and-file police officers. They argued that it would pull money away from mental health clinicians, homeless outreach workers and many other city needs. They warned of the financial consequences for other agencies, particularly if the city is confronted with a major economic downturn. In May 2024, the Los Angeles City Council adopted a budget that slashed funding to nearly all city departments apart from the LAPD. Once again Soto-Martinez, Raman, and Hernandez dissented.

In 2024, the Los Angeles City Council faced a significant push for ethics reform following a series of corruption and harassment scandals. During the negotiations for stricter ethics regulations, Soto-Martinez introduced a series of last-minute amendments that ultimately diluted the reform measures.

In June 2024, Soto-Martinez helped remove U-Turn signs that were considered discriminatory as they had been installed in the neighborhoods in 1997 to deter gay men from cruising the streets.

In December 2024, amid a housing shortage in Los Angeles, Soto-Martinez voted against a proposal to allow mid-sized mixed-income and affordable housing apartment buildings near public transit stations in some neighborhoods exclusively zoned for single-family houses. He pointed to opposition to the proposal by some of his constituents, "I don’t believe my constituents have been part of a thoughtful, deliberative process."

In April 2026, Soto-Martinez and councilmember Ysabel Jurado released a proposal to allow noncitizens the right to vote in local elections, including those for the mayorship and Los Angeles Board of Education seats.

In June 2026, Soto-Martinez endorsed incumbent LA mayor Karen Bass over his fellow progressive Nithya Raman in the runoff election for Los Angeles mayor.
