= Imelda Padilla =

American politician (born 1987)

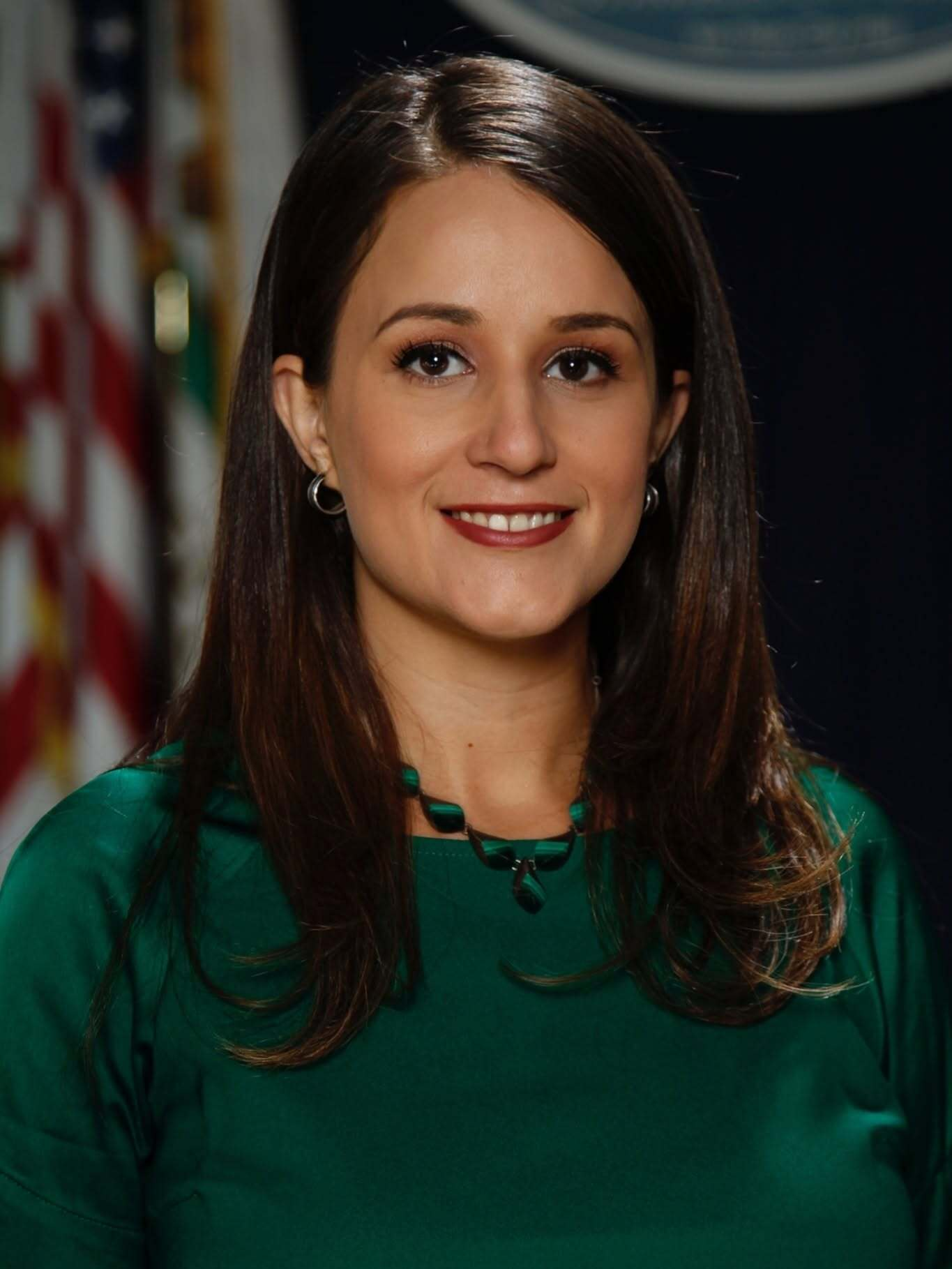
- Official portrait, 2025

Member of the Los Angeles City Council from the 6th district
- Incumbent
- Assumed office July 5, 2023; Acting: July 5, 2023 – August 1, 2023
- Preceded by: Nury Martinez

Personal details
- Born: 1987 (age 38–39) Los Angeles, California, U.S.
- Party: Democratic
- Education: University of California, Berkeley (BA); California State University, Northridge (MA)
- Website: City Council website Campaign website

Imelda G. Padilla (born 1987) is an American politician who is currently a member of the Los Angeles City Council representing the 6th district since 2023. Elected in the 2023 Los Angeles special election to replace Nury Martinez, Padilla previously worked as a community relations manager.

She was a candidate for the Los Angeles Unified School District's Board of Education for the 6th district, losing to Kelly Gonez in the runoff election.

== Early life and education ==
Padilla was born in 1987 in Van Nuys and raised in Sun Valley, a first-generation Mexican-American. Her father was a gardener and her mother worked at an airplane factory. One of several children, Padilla stated she followed her older sisters towards community service. She attended John H. Francis Polytechnic High School, with her sisters introducing her to the L.A. City Youth Council when she was in ninth grade. While attending public schools, Padilla reports she had rickets and was bullied by other kids.

She attended and graduated from University of California, Berkeley with a bachelor's degree, later graduating from California State University, Northridge with a master's degree. She worked on engagement for the L.A. County’s Women and Girls Initiative, Los Angeles Alliance for a New Economy, and Pacoima Beautiful, as well as being a field deputy for councilmember Nury Martinez.

== Political career ==
=== Run for LAUSD Board of Education ===
In 2016, Padilla announced that she would be running for LAUSD's Board of Education for the 6th district, which was being vacated by Monica Ratliff's run for City Council, stating that various people had come to her asking her to run. She was backed by United Teachers Los Angeles and other unions. In the primary election, she was behind Kelly Gonez, a schoolteacher who was backed by the California Charter School Association, and they went into a runoff. In the general election, Padilla lost against Gonez.

=== Los Angeles City Council ===
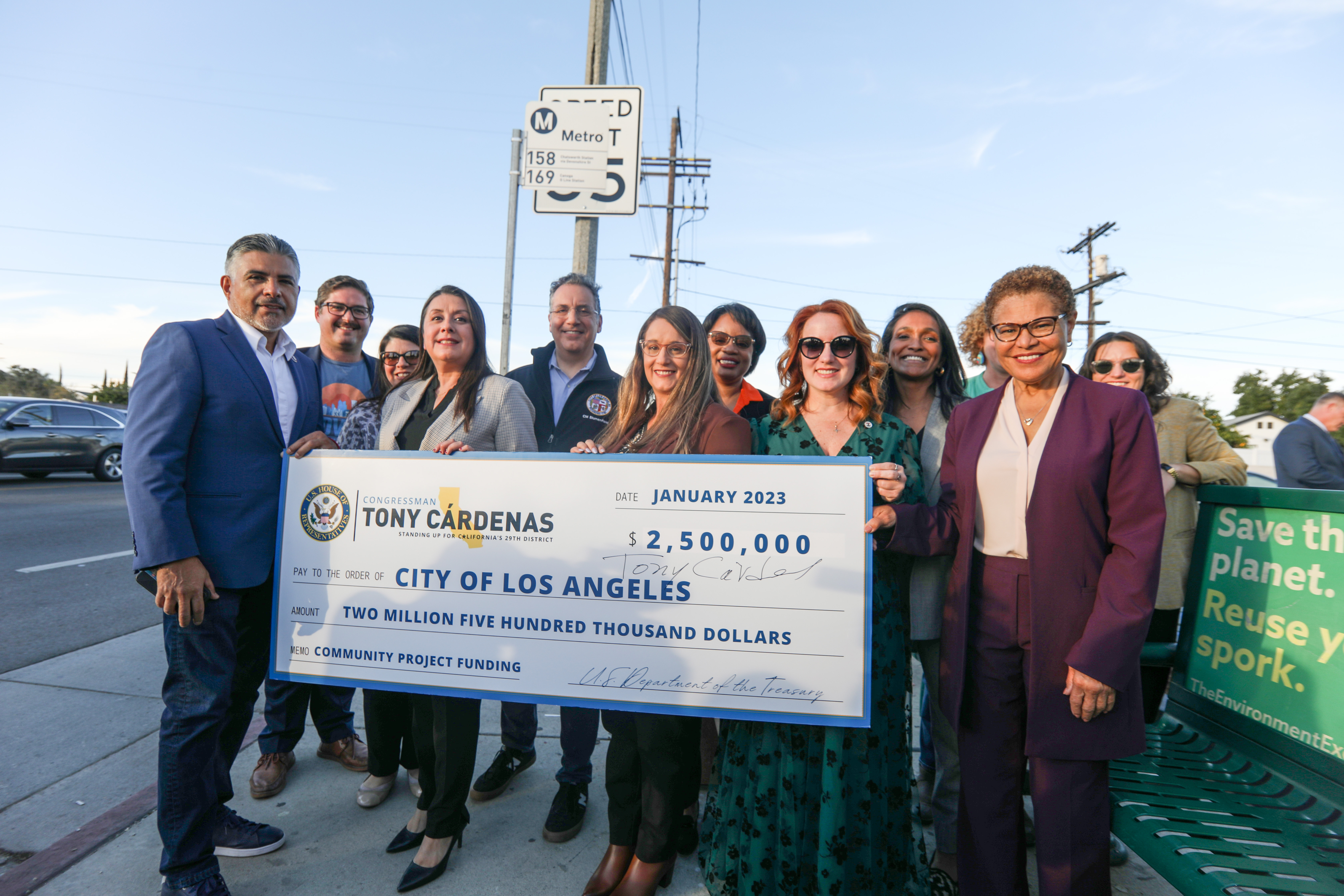
Padilla (center) with Karen Bass, Tony Cárdenas, and other officials announcing funds for new bus shelters, 2023.

In 2022, Padilla announced that she would be running for Los Angeles City Council for the 6th district, which was vacated by incumbent Nury Martinez due to her involvement in a scandal. She was endorsed by councilmember Monica Rodriguez as well as former councilmembers Joy Picus and Tony Cárdenas, all of them with districts in the San Fernando Valley where the 6th district is also located. Some people criticized her for her closeness with Nury Martinez, working for her while Martinez was the director for Pacoima Beautiful and while she was a councilmember. In the primary election, Padilla led the candidates in first place as three others fought for second place; she eventually faced Marisa Alcaraz in the runoff election. In the runoff election, Padilla took an early lead and later defeated Alcaraz. The same day she declared victory, Council President Paul Krekorian introduced a motion to appoint her to the seat before the results were certified as well as naming her as caretaker before the certification.

On February 26, 2025, Padilla was appointed to the Board of Directors of the LA Metro by Los Angeles Mayor, Karen Bass.

=== Opposition to housing ===
On December 10, 2024, Padilla voted no on a proposed amendment to the City's Housing Element that would have allowed development of multi-family housing on parcels zoned exclusively for single-family units. The amendment failed 5-10. The City is required by state law SB 828 (Wiener, 2018) to plan for the production of 456,643 new housing units from 2021-2029. Without the upzoning of single-family parcels, the City Planning department forecasts that Los Angeles will only be able to achieve the production of 230,947 units over the course of that period.

In September 2023, Padilla was one of five councilmembers who voted against an affordable housing project located in a single-family zone, despite the project being supported by the council district where it was located. On January 30, 2024, when a similar project located in her district came up before the council, Padilla was absent for the vote, and the project was denied. The developer then sued the city for violating the California Housing Accountability Act. In 2025, a judge ruled that Los Angeles illegally denied the project.

On August 19, 2025, Padilla voted yes on a resolution to record the City's opposition to SB 79 (Wiener, 2025), a bill that would override local control over land use planning by legalizing the production of high-density housing near high-quality public transit stations in the state. The City Council resolution passed 8-5, with 2 absent members who did not cast votes.

In an interview with Jon Lovett of Pod Save America, Padilla said that she was responsible for a six-story housing development in her district being shrunk a to a three-story development in order to "incorporate a few more parking lots and EV chargers." In the same interview, she said that she does not approve of the provisions of Executive Directive 1 (ED 1), Mayor Karen Bass' landmark housing policy, that limit the ability of City Councilmembers to block proposed housing developments that are located within their district. Senator Scott Wiener, who appeared in the same interview opposite Padilla, later partially credited Padilla's statements in the interview, as well as the dissent of five City Council members against the anti-SB 79 resolution, for having sped the passage of the bill.

== Electoral history ==
2017 LAUSD Board of Education district 6 election
Primary election
Candidate	Votes	%
Kelly Gonez	15,984	37.16
Imelda Padilla	13,390	31.13
Patty López	5,159	11.99
Araz Parseghian	3,853	8.96
Gwendolyn Posey	2,483	5.77
Jose Sandoval	2,149	5.00
Total votes	43,018	100.00
General election
Kelly Gonez	16,961	51.46
Imelda Padilla	15,996	48.54
Total votes	32,957	100.00

2023 Los Angeles City Council district 6 special election
Candidate	Votes	%
Imelda Padilla	3,424	25.66
Marisa Alcaraz	2,819	21.13
Marco Santana	2,523	18.91
Rose Grigoryan	1,985	14.88
Isaac Kim	1,455	10.90
Antoinette Scully	745	5.58
Douglas Sierra	393	2.95
Write-in	162	1.23
Total votes	13,506	100.00
Imelda Padilla	8,520	55.79
Marisa Alcaraz	6,751	44.21
Total votes	15,271	100.00
