= Eunisses Hernandez =

American activist and politician

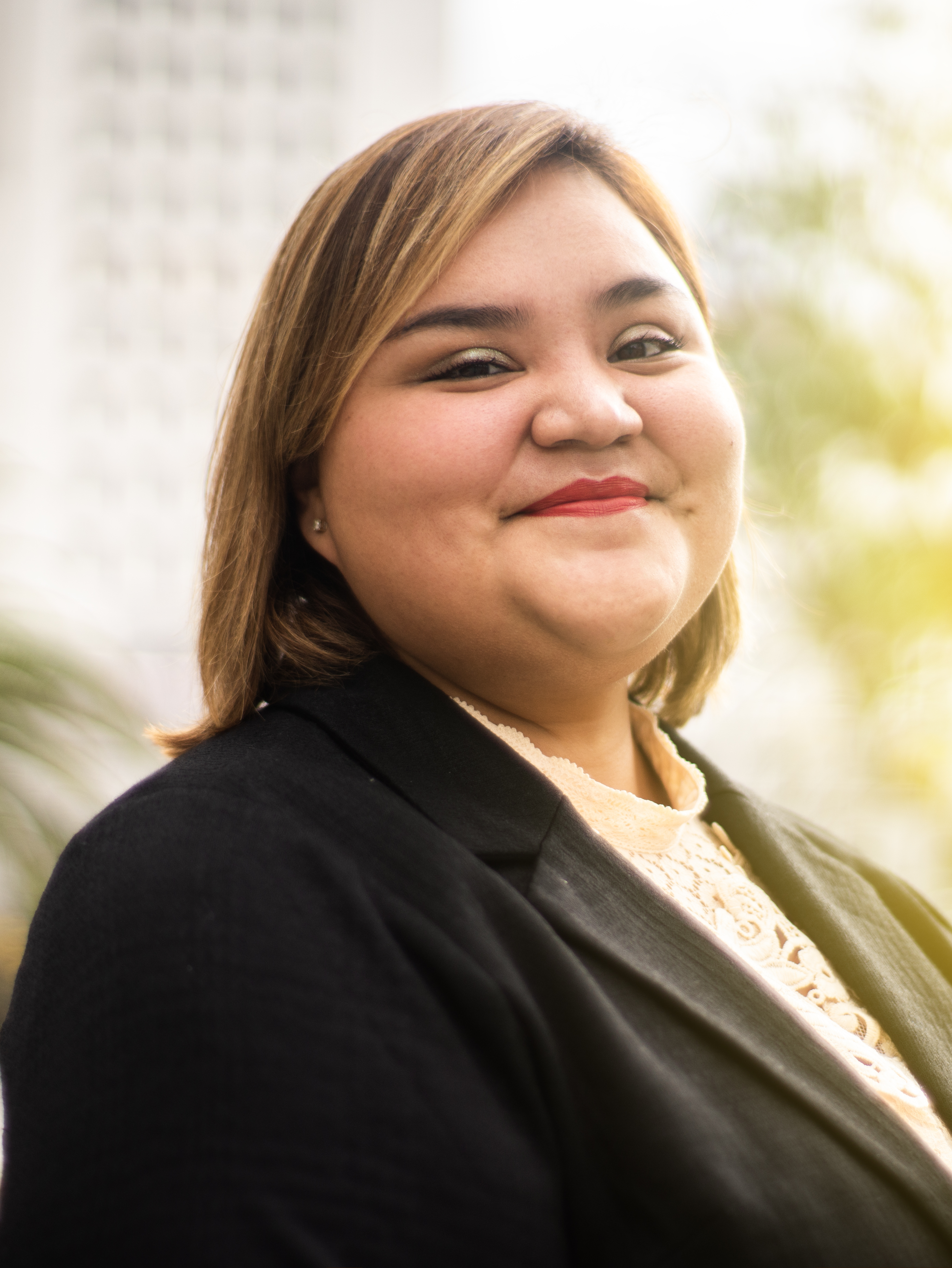
- Official portrait, 2022

Member of the Los Angeles City Council from the 1st district
- Incumbent
- Assumed office December 12, 2022
- Preceded by: Gil Cedillo

Personal details
- Born: 1990 (age 35–36) Los Angeles, California, U.S.
- Party: Democratic
- Education: California State University, Los Angeles (attended); California State University, Long Beach (BA)

Eunisses Hernandez (born 1990) is an American activist and politician, currently serving as a member of the Los Angeles City Council for the 1st district since 2022. A member of the Democratic Party and the Democratic Socialists of America, Hernandez defeated incumbent councilmember Gil Cedillo during the primary in an upset in the 2022 election.

A self-described police and prison abolitionist, Hernandez was endorsed by progressive groups and leaders like City Councilman Mike Bonin and Dolores Huerta, as well as the Los Angeles Times. Following the June 2022 election, news outlets including the Los Angeles Daily News, KABC-TV, and the Los Angeles Times reported that Hernandez had effectively defeated incumbent Gil Cedillo. The election results were certified on July 1, 2022, and Cedillo conceded the same day.

== Early life and career ==
Hernandez was born in 1990 to Mexican immigrants, Juan and Leticia Hernandez, and grew up in Highland Park, Los Angeles. Early in her life, Hernandez thought about becoming a police officer. She attended Franklin High School and later California State University, Los Angeles for one year in 2009, where she majored in civil engineering. During her employment at Universal Studios Hollywood, she graduated from California State University, Long Beach with a bachelor's degree in criminal justice in 2013. It was during her time at CSU Long Beach where she "experienced [...] a revelation" after she took a class for criminology and the war on drugs.

== Career ==
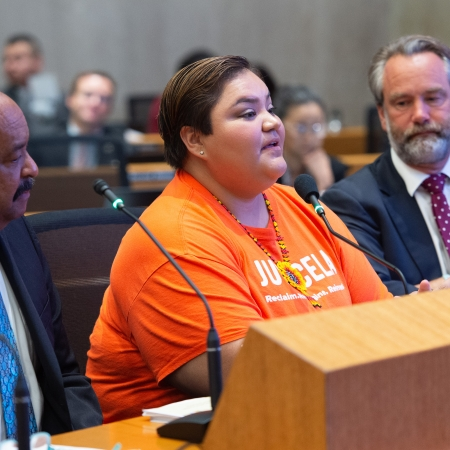
Hernandez giving testimony to the Board of Supervisors in 2020.

Hernandez started her career in 2014 as a policy coordinator for the Drug Policy Alliance where she advocated for the passing of Senate Bill 180 and California Proposition 64. In 2018, she moved to JustLeadershipUSA as a campaign coordinator for JusticeLA where she pushed for a halt to a plan to build a new $3.5 million women's jail at the county's Mira Loma facility in Lancaster. In 2019, she was appointed by the Los Angeles Board of Supervisors to be a community stakeholder for an Alternatives to Incarceration working group.

In 2020, she co-founded La Defensa with Ivette Alé, a women-led organization that supports reducing the number of incarcerated people in Los Angeles County. That same year she co-chaired Measure J, a ballot initiative that would allocate at least 10% of Los Angeles County's funding for community reinvestment and incarceration alternatives. She co-chaired the ballot initiative campaign with future Assemblymember Isaac Bryan and future councilmember Hugo Soto-Martinez; the initiative passed with 57.12% of the vote. In 2021, the measure was temporarily blocked by Los Angeles County Superior Court Judge Mary Strobel, who ruled that Measure J violated California law by infringing on the County Board of Supervisors' authority to set budgets; in 2023, however, the California Court of Appeals reversed this ruling, allowing the measure to take effect.

=== Los Angeles City Council ===
On October 8, 2021, Hernandez announced her campaign for Los Angeles City Council District 1 in the 2022 elections. After three other candidates were disqualified, she was the only opponent against incumbent Gil Cedillo. Hernandez was endorsed by multiple progressive groups and leaders, with Council-member Mike Bonin and Dolores Huerta endorsing her in the primary. Hernandez ultimately unseated Cedillo with 53.9% of the vote, avoiding the need for a runoff.

In May 2023, Hernandez was the only member of the Los Angeles City Council to vote against Mayor Karen Bass's first budget. Hernandez cited the $3.2 billion allocated to the LAPD as the motivation for her vote, giving a speech in which she said that "we are celebrating moving pennies around, while we put a quarter of our entire budget into just one department."

In May 2023, Hernandez spoke at a press event to reveal “La Sombrita", a piece of grated metal on a pole intended to provide shade and lighting for bus riders at a bus stop. The bus stop structure was criticized for failing to provide any meaningful shade.

In August 2023, Hernandez along with Nithya Raman and Hugo Soto-Martinez voted against a four-year package of raises and bonuses for rank-and-file police officers. They argued that it would pull money away from mental health clinicians, homeless outreach workers and many other city needs. They warned of the financial consequences for other agencies, particularly if the city is confronted with a major economic downturn. Hernandez and Raman reeled off a list of services that they said are in need of more money — streetlights, sidewalk repairs, building inspections, alley resurfacing and other city operations.

Hernandez co-introduced a 2023 motion directing the city attorney to draft a sanctuary city ordinance for Los Angeles. The ordinance, which prohibits the use of city resources for federal immigration enforcement, was approved by the City Council in 2024.

Hernandez has supported expanding unarmed crisis response programs in Los Angeles. She co-chairs the City Council's Ad Hoc Committee on Unarmed Crisis Prevention, Intervention, and Community Services, which oversees the city's Unarmed Model of Crisis Response program for mental health and nonviolent emergency calls. In 2026, the City Council voted unanimously on her motion to make the program permanent after city reports found that most calls handled by the program were resolved without police involvement.

In 2024, Hernandez introduced a motion to suspend private construction of a $300 million 1.2 mile gondola lift connecting Union Station to Dodger Stadium. She put forward a motion to provide $500,000 to consultants to study traffic to the Dodger Stadium.

In 2024, there was a major push in the L.A. City Council to implement ethics reform in the aftermath of a number of corruption and harassment scandals. During negotiations to implement more stringent ethics reforms, Hernandez introduced a series of late amendments that watered down the reform.

In May 2026, Hernandez endorsed incumbent LA mayor Karen Bass over her fellow progressive Nithya Raman in the runoff election for Los Angeles mayor.

==== Housing ====
During her campaign and first term on city council, Hernandez has prioritized expanding renter's protections, preventing the demolition of rent-stabilized housing, and initiatives to construct affordable and social housing. During the campaign, she said, "My plan to fight gentrification is to be the biggest barrier I can to luxury and market-rate development," and argued that the city should help community land trusts buy apartments. She also expressed support for the discretionary permit system in Los Angeles, which gives City Council members discretionary power over land-use decisions, allowing them to veto proposed projects.

In office, Hernandez rallied along with councilmembers Nithya Raman, Heather Hutt, and Hugo Soto-Martinez to pass substantially expanded universal rights for Los Angeles renters. She later co-sponsored a motion intended to expand the city's capacity to build a large-scale social housing program in Los Angeles. In 2024, Hernandez cosponsored amendments to the city's tenant anti-harassment ordinance to increase penalties against landlords, which passed over the opposition of three councilmembers. In 2025, in response to the 2025 Los Angeles wildfires, Hernandez co-authored a motion with Councilmember Hugo Soto-Martinez for a moratorium on evictions and rent hikes for affected households. It was the only one of 28 emergency motions that was deferred for later action.

In 2023, she reversed an effort by her predecessor to remove housing height limits in a section of Chinatown. In 2023, Hernandez supported a motion in the City Council to prohibit the sale or rental of recreational vehicles for use as housing. In 2024, Hernandez supported an amendment by councilmember Nithya Raman to allow buildings up to 16 units to be constructed in areas previously zoned for single-family housing, saying that "preserving wealthy single-family neighborhoods represents a continuation of past segregationist policies." The amendment failed by a 10-5 vote. In 2025, Hernandez dissented from a majority of the city council, who passed a resolution in opposition to Senate Bill 79, a bill which upzoned areas within half a mile of transit stops.

== Electoral history ==
Results by precinct map

2022 Los Angeles City Council District 1 election
Primary election
Candidate	Votes	%
Eunisses Hernandez	16,108	53.9
Gil Cedillo (incumbent)	13,700	45.8
Elaine Alaniz (write-in)	80	0.3
Total votes	29,888	100.00
