= Rundberg =

Rundberg is a surname. Notable people with the surname include:

- Arvid Rundberg (1932–2010), Swedish author and journalist
- Claës Rundberg (1874–1958), Swedish sport shooter
- Karl L. Rundberg (1899–1969), American businessman and politician
