= Lisa Specht =

American lawyer, civic leader and former television journalist

- Education: University of West Los Angeles
- Occupations: Lawyer; Civic leader Journalist

Lisa Specht is an American lawyer, civic leader, and former television journalist. She is emeritus chair of the board of the Los Angeles Music Center.

== Early life and education ==
Raised in La Cañada Flintridge, California, Specht graduated from Herbert Hoover High School in Glendale and was the first female editor of the law review at the University of San Fernando College of Law.

== Career ==
Specht is a partner at Manatt, Phelps and Phillips in Los Angeles, providing legal advice to businesses. She has served as a judge pro tem in the West Los Angeles Small Claims Court, and in 1985 ran unsuccessfully for city attorney against James Hahn.

She worked for KABC-TV for ten years starting in 1979, after getting the idea for legal segments on news broadcasts from the medical segments presented by her friend Art Ulene. In 1991 with Robb Weller, she co-presented the NBC reality show Trial Watch, in which she covered a variety of courtroom cases and interviewed defendants, prosecutors, and jurors.

=== Civic positions ===
Specht became chair of the nonprofit board of the Los Angeles Music Center in 2013, In October 2019 she was succeeded by former city councilwoman Cindy Miscikowski and named chair emeritus; the welcome pavilion at its redesigned plaza was named for her. She also served as Chair of the Los Angeles Memorial Coliseum Commission and as a Commissioner on the City of Los Angeles Recreation and Parks Commission, and is a trustee of Pitzer College. The weekly Los Angeles Business Journal newspaper named her among the leaders in its August 2017 edition of "The Los Angeles 500: The Most Influential People in Los Angeles".

== Personal life ==
Specht was married to Ron Rogers, a public relations executive who died in 2016. They owned a cattle ranch in Colorado.
