= A Bridge Home Venice Beach =

American homeless shelter

Coordinates: 33.9939°N 118.4767°W

- Established: 2020
- Headquarters: Venice Beach, California
- Region served: Los Angeles metropolitan area
- Services: homeless services, residential programs

A Bridge Home Venice Beach was a homeless shelter in Venice Beach, California, announced in 2019 and active from 2020 to 2024. The shelter is part of the A Bridge Home (ABH) program, a Los Angeles temporary housing program that opened at least 10 sites, with plans for 26 sites. The idea behind bridge housing is to temporarily house people until they can be moved to permanent housing.

== Conception ==
The shelter was built on land owned by the Los Angeles County Metropolitan Transportation Authority (Metro). The shelter is estimated to have cost $8.6 million dollars to build and $3.4 million dollars per year to operate. Politicians involved in the opening include Los Angeles's 11th City Council district councilmember Mike Bonin and Los Angeles mayor Eric Garcetti.

== Operation ==
The shelter consisted of bungalows and a large tent, accommodated both men and women, and contained 154 beds. The shelter was "low-barrier" (did not require sobriety), but had rules against drugs and alcohol on premises. The organizations People Assisting The Homeless (PATH) and Safe Place for Youth (SPY) provided services in the shelter. The shelter helped around 772 individuals, and around 211 of those individuals ended up in permanent housing.

During some of 2020–2021, in response to the COVID-19 pandemic, the shelter's capacity was reduced to promote social distancing. Also during the pandemic, homeless encampment sidewalk cleanups were paused to discourage the homeless from scattering, which it was feared would spread COVID-19.

== Controversy ==
The shelter was located in a mostly residential neighborhood and near Westminster Elementary School, which was controversial. There was also an issue with "dual residents": people who lived in the homeless shelter sometimes but also kept their tents and lived on the streets sometimes. There was also concern with the low number of people graduating from the homeless shelter into permanent housing: an article by the Westside Current states that "after 2 years, only 30 people" moved from A Bridge Home Venice Beach into permanent housing. This is in contrast to the original shelter goals of filling 154 beds and having those residents stay for 90 days before moving to permanent housing, setting an expectation that 600 people per year would make it into permanent housing. Near the shelter, a neighbor complained of having to clean up vomit, and another neighbor described his acquaintances getting assaulted. In a letter by a group of neighbors, they stated that the neighborhood used to be safe, but became unsafe after the shelter opened. There was also an expectation that construction of the homeless shelter would be coupled with a crackdown on homeless camps near the shelter, however there were around 100 encampments recorded in the area one month after the shelter opened.

== Post-closure plans ==
The shelter will be replaced by 341 apartments, 25% of which will be low-income housing, plus commercial space.

== See also ==
- Homelessness in California#City of Los Angeles
