= Bill Rosendahl =

American politician

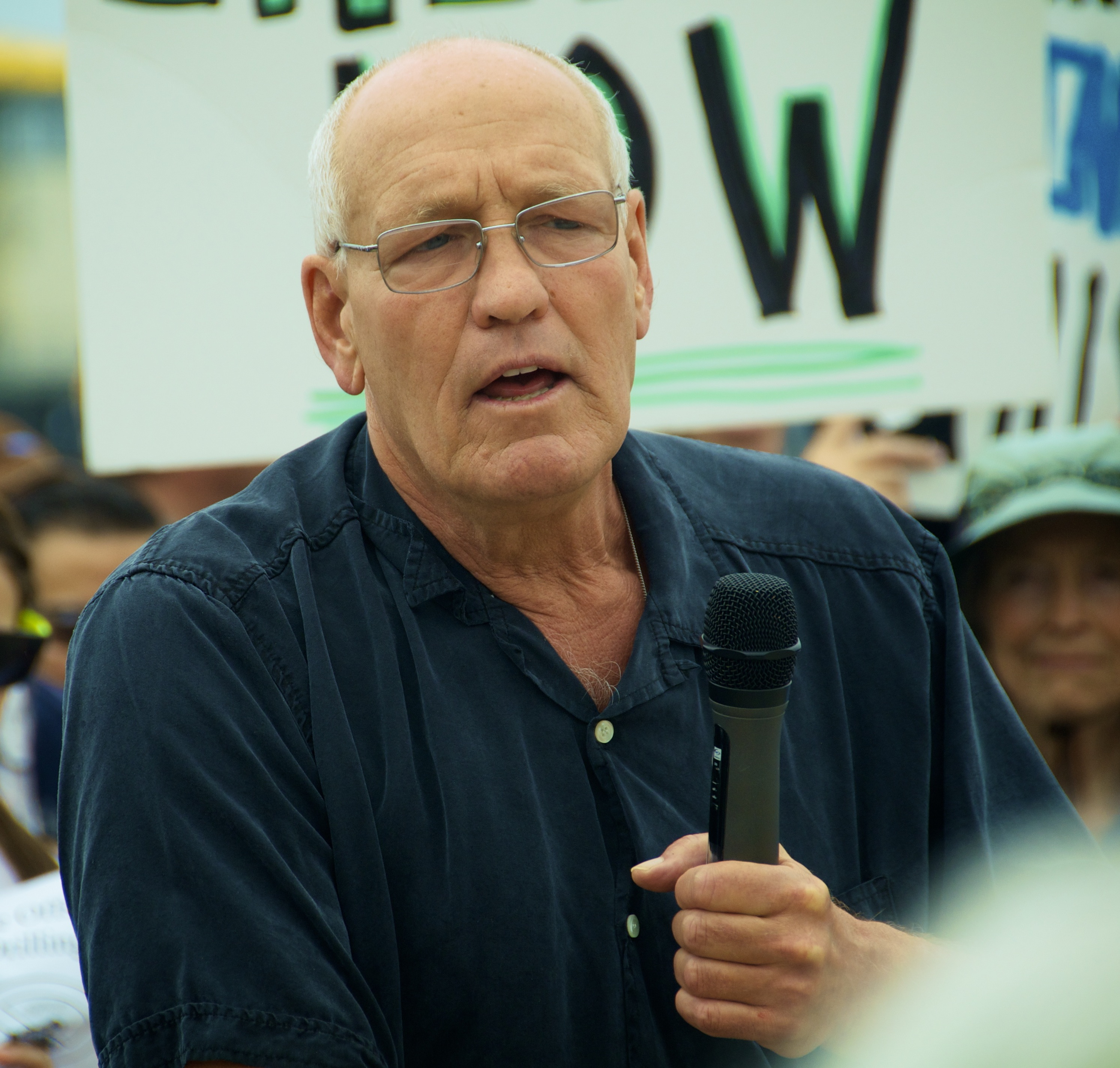
- Rosendahl in 2010

Member of the Los Angeles City Council from the 11th district
- In office July 1, 2005 – July 1, 2013
- Preceded by: Cindy Miscikowski
- Succeeded by: Mike Bonin

Personal details
- Born: William Joseph Rosendahl; May 15, 1945 Englewood, New Jersey, U.S.
- Died: March 30, 2016 (aged 70) Los Angeles, California, U.S.
- Party: Democratic
- Education: Saint Vincent College, University of Pittsburgh

William Joseph Rosendahl (May 15, 1945 – March 30, 2016) was an American politician. He served on the Los Angeles City Council, representing Council District 11 from 2005 to 2013. He was a member of the Democratic Party.

Prior to being a councilman, Rosendahl was an educator, television broadcaster, and a vice president at Adelphia.

== Early life ==
Rosendahl was born the sixth of eight children in Englewood, New Jersey, to a German Catholic household. His parents fled Europe during the rise of the Nazi Germany. They had met in New York City and later moved to Bergenfield, New Jersey, before Englewood to make room for their growing family. While attending St. Cecilia Catholic School, he was elected president of the junior class and president of the student government.

Rosendahl graduated with a bachelor's degree in political science and economics from Saint Vincent College in Latrobe, Pennsylvania. He went on to attend the University of Pittsburgh, where he demonstrated against the Reserve Officers' Training Corps program on campus. He graduated with a Master of Social Work in urban organizing and political views.

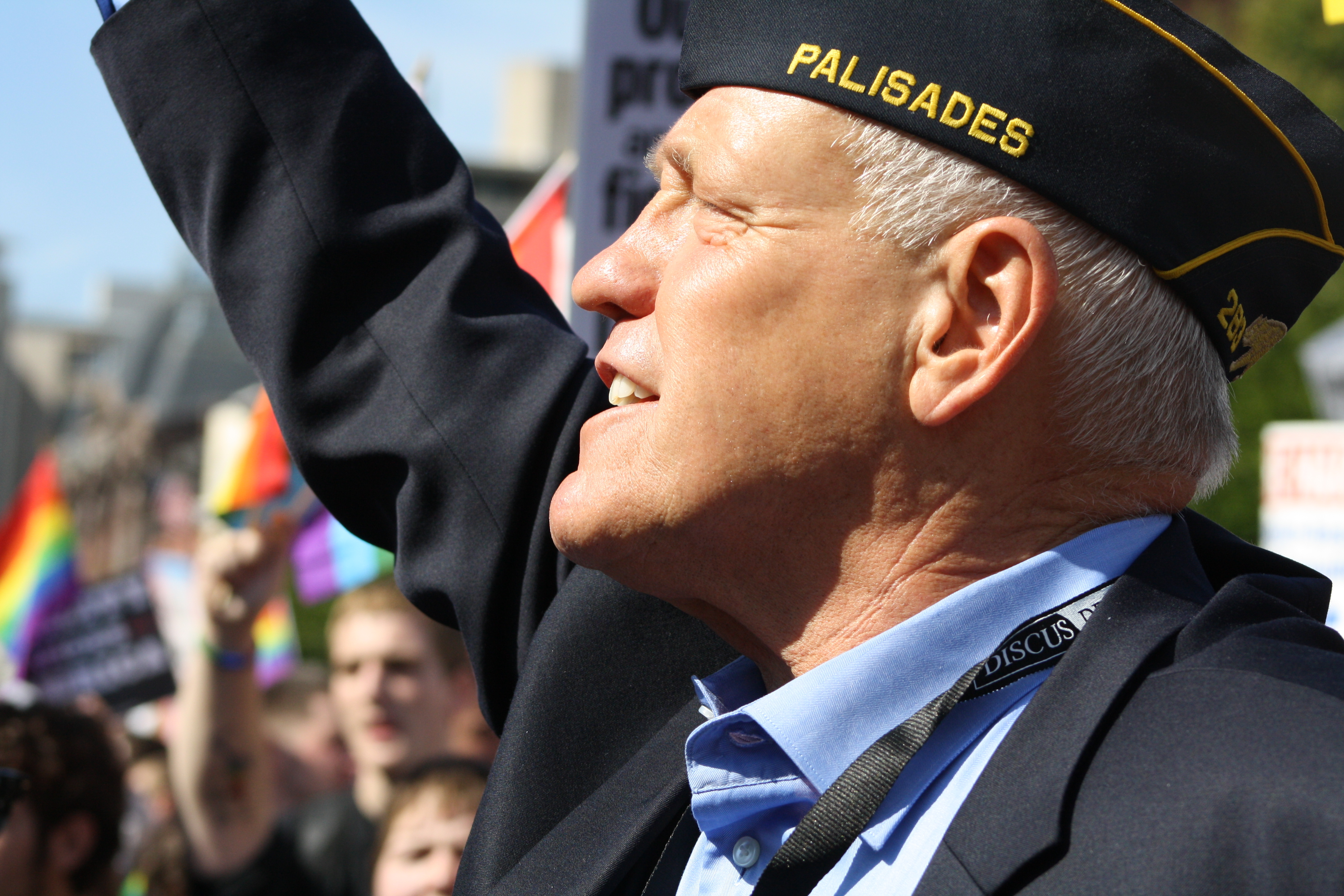
Rosendahl with his American Legion Palisades cap in 2009.

Rosendahl served in the U.S. Army from 1969 to 1971 during the Vietnam War. He spent a year as a psychiatric social worker, counseling troops returning from combat. While stationed at Fort Carson, he was special assistant to General Bernard W. Rogers. Rosendahl was a member of The American Legion, Post 283, in Pacific Palisades, Los Angeles.

== Professional career ==
Prior to his election, Rosendahl was an educator and an award-winning television broadcaster with a long record as a leader in Los Angeles civic affairs. While he served as Distinguished Professor at California State University, Dominguez Hills until his election, Rosendahl was best known as producer and moderator of critically acclaimed public affairs television shows.

He has hosted public affairs programs, such as Local Talk, Week in Review, and Beyond the Beltway, and produced more than 3,000 programs during his 16 years in journalism.

As a cable executive, Rosendahl fought for better service, upgraded technology, more local programming choices, and better wages and working conditions for his employees. His public service won him the Cable Ace Award, The Diamond Award, the Freedom of Information Award, the Los Angeles League of Women Voters Public Service Award and the Beacon Award for Cable's Free Air Time Project.

Rosendahl also engaged himself in civic life. He chaired the California Commission on Tax Policy in the New Economy, served as president of the Los Angeles Press Club, as chairman of the Cable and Telecommunication Association and was a member of the education fund of the Los Angeles League of Women Voters. He was a regular moderator of community forums, steering discussions on various issues including charter reform, secession and the formation of neighborhood councils.

Rosendahl was active in politics throughout his life. He worked on the Eugene McCarthy and Robert F. Kennedy campaigns in the 1968 Democratic Party presidential primaries. During the 1972 United States presidential election, he fundraised for Democratic nominee George McGovern. He later was appointed by the White House to the United States Department of State as Chief of Operations for the U.S. Trade and Development Program. He later worked as an associate in philanthropic work for John D. Rockefeller III.

== Los Angeles City Council (2005–2013) ==
In the May 2005 election, Rosendahl defeated community activist Flora Gil Krisiloff 56.6% to 43.4% to replace Westside City Councilwoman Cindy Miscikowski, who termed out. He represented the Los Angeles City Council District 11, which included neighborhoods from Pacific Palisades to Westchester, Los Angeles. A resident of Mar Vista, Rosendahl was the first openly gay man elected to the Los Angeles City Council and was the city’s highest-ranking LGBT official.

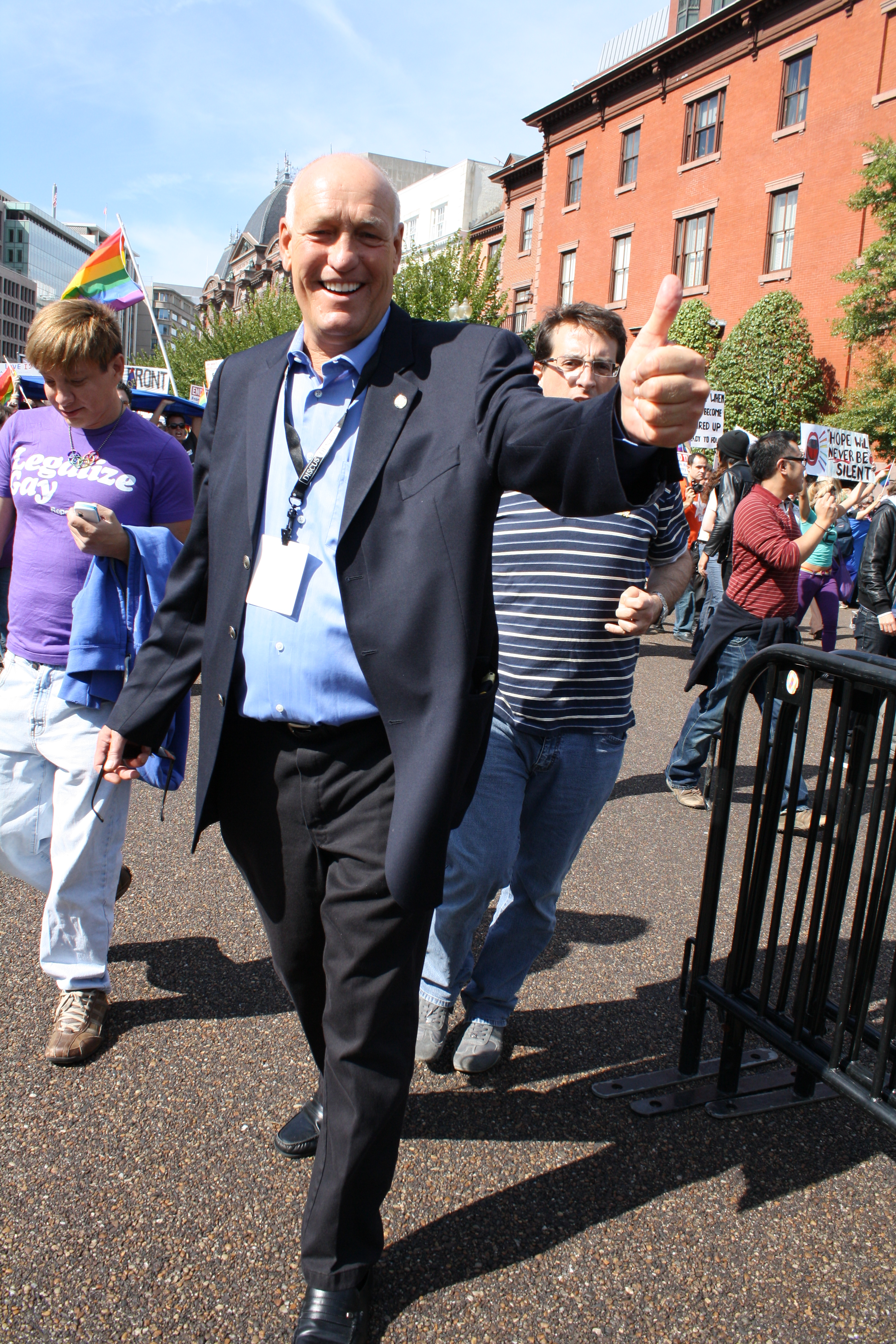
Rosendahl at the National Equality March in October 2009

He has often been described by his colleagues as the "conscience of the City Council". He denounced the Iraq War and the War in Afghanistan.

He was the Chair of the Transportation Committee, Vice Chair of the Trade, Commerce &Tourism, he was a member of Budget & Finance, Vice Chair of the Ad Hoc Stadium Committee, a member of the Ad Hoc on Economic Recovery & Reinvestment and a member of Board of Referred Powers.

Serving as chairman of the Transportation Committee, he attempted to use his position to ease traffic congestion in America's most congested city, using Measure R funding to push for subway construction from finally completing the Green Line to expanding the Expo Line creating new bus routes, and seeking innovative solutions to mitigate the traffic problem. He served as vice-chair of the Commerce Committee, which oversees Los Angeles World Airports, including Los Angeles International Airport. Rosendahl was also a member of the council’s Transportation Committee, Budget & Finance Committee, and Ad Hoc Committee on Homelessness, which he co-founded. He chaired of the Southern California Regional Airport Authority and one of the city's appointees to the Santa Monica Bay Restoration Commission.

From the time he took office in July 2005, Rosendahl focused upon: stopping the expansion of Los Angeles International Airport, promoting mass transit, enhancing public safety, curbing overdevelopment, standing up for tenants’ rights and for affordable housing, seeking solutions to the problem of homelessness and giving neighborhoods a greater voice in city decision-making. According to some his most notable achievement was the historic agreement between LAX and airport neighbors, ending airport expansion and promoting regional aviation.

Rosendahl opted to not run for a third term after his cancer diagnosis in 2012. He was succeeded by his chief of staff, Mike Bonin

== Personal life ==
He was openly gay during the majority of his adulthood but struggled with the idea of being gay in his youth. At the age of 29 he took eighteen months off from work and toured around the world, coming to the conclusion that he was gay. At first he was upset about this realization, due to the struggles he would likely endure. Rosendahl had first suspected that he was gay during early puberty in the Boy Scouts. He noticed that he had an attraction to boys instead of girls. He later checked out a book on homosexuality from a local library and learned about the significance of Fire Island and Christopher Street to gay people. Rosendahl would come to the realization later in his life that homosexuality was simply "another expression of nature," and no reason to be ashamed.

Rosendahl stated in an interview with the Lavender Effect that he was the victim of a gay-bashing incident while in graduate school. He was walking from a gay bar to campus when five men ran up to him screaming obscenities and slurs and then began beating him. He fought back but received injuries. He filed a police report about the incident.

Rosendahl endured discrimination while working at Westinghouse Broadcasting and Cable, where his boss removed his staff and placed him in a windowless office because they suspected that he was gay. At the age of 32, at his mother's funeral, he came out to his family. He later came out to his boss, the chairman of the board of Century Cable and found his boss to be accepting.

Christopher Blauman and Rosendahl were romantic partners for fourteen years. Blauman died from AIDS in January 1995. After Blauman's death, Rosendahl became an AIDS advocate and was an advisor to the AIDS Healthcare Foundation. Later in life, he and Hedi el Kholti were partners for nearly two decades, until Rosendahl's death.

Rosendahl had an affinity for nature and believed that having a connection to the environment was key to preserving the mental health and vitality of gay people. He kept a garden regularly and considered it key to his survival.

== Death ==
In 2012, Rosendahl was diagnosed with stage four cancer. He was told by doctors that he would likely be dead before the upcoming November elections. The disease went into remission in 2013 but came back in 2014. Rosendahl died at his home in Mar Vista, Los Angeles of ureteral cancer on March 30, 2016, at the age of 70.

== See also ==
- Los Angeles City Council
- Los Angeles City Council District 11

Political offices
Preceded by Cindy Miscikowski	Los Angeles City Councilmember, 11th district July 1, 2005 – July 1, 2013	Succeeded by Mike Bonin
