= Harold Harby =

American politician (1894–1978)

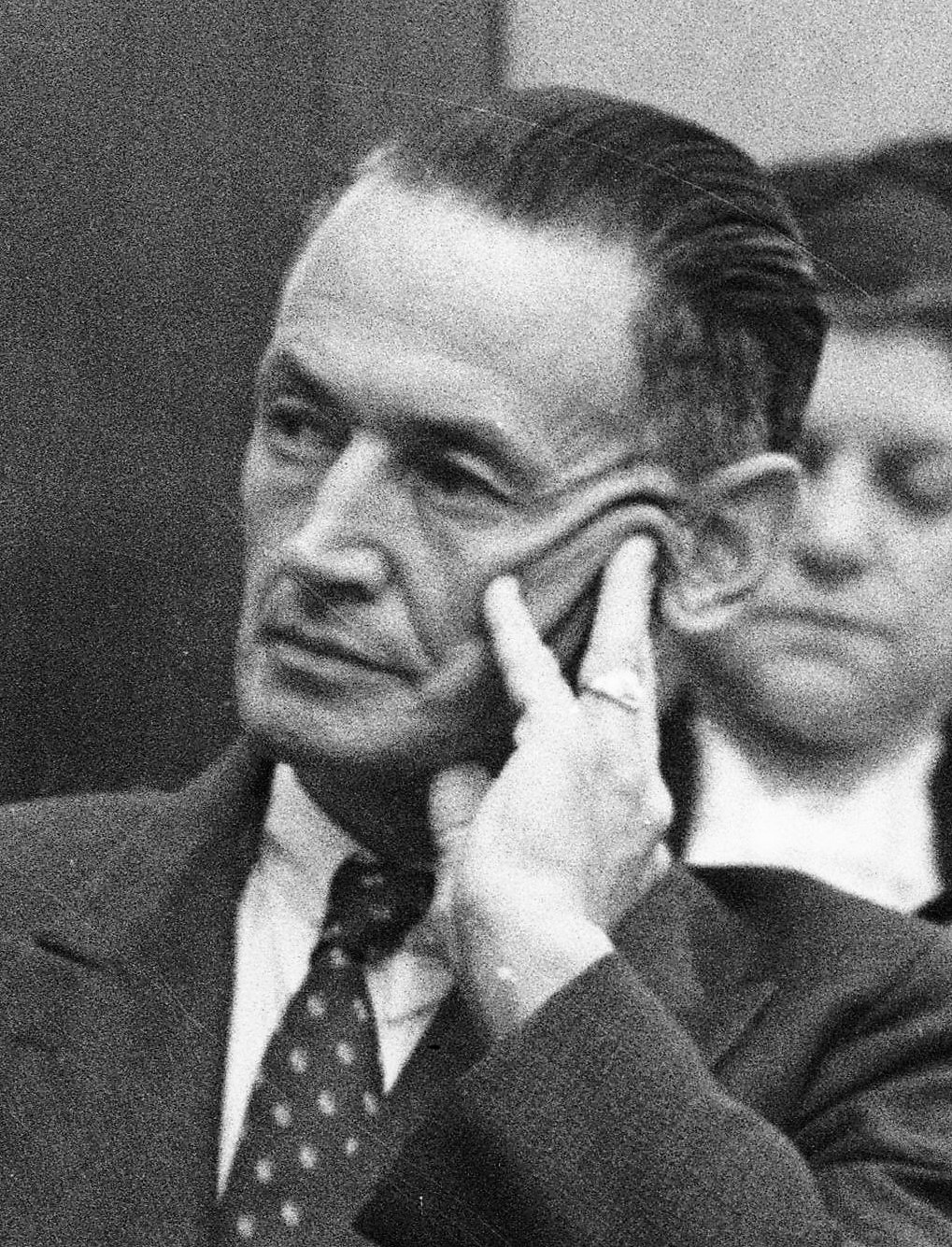
- Harby in 1937

Member of the Los Angeles City Council from the 11th district
- In office July 1, 1939 – January 12, 1942
- Preceded by: Robert S. MacAlister
- Succeeded by: Dave Stannard
- In office July 1, 1943 – June 30, 1957
- Preceded by: Dave Stannard
- Succeeded by: Karl L. Rundberg

Personal details
- Born: September 8, 1894 Gjøvik, Norway
- Died: November 24, 1978 (aged 84) Laguna Hills, California
- Party: Democratic
- Occupation: Politician

Harold Harby (September 8, 1894 – November 24, 1978) was elected to the Los Angeles, California, City Council in 1939, but he had to leave office in 1942 when he was convicted of using a city car for a trip out of the state. He was reelected in 1943 and served until 1957. Harby was noted for casting a 1951 swing vote that killed a $100 million proposal to build a massive public-housing project in the city as well as for his opposition to modern art and music.

== Biography ==
Harby was born September 8, 1894, in Gjøvik, Norway, the son of Mr. and Mrs. O.J. Harby. He attended high school in that country and came to the United States in 1910. He was married in 1917 to Emmalee Thompson of Great Falls, Montana. They had two sons, Harold D. and Thornton L., and in the late 1930s he was living at 2642 Halm Avenue in Los Angeles in the Reynier Village neighborhood.

He moved to California in 1918 to work at West Coast shipyards and then became associated with the oil business, working at various times for Shell Oil, Richfield Oil and Pacific Western Oil.

Harby died November 24, 1978, in Laguna Hills, California, after a lengthy illness. Memorial services were in Forest Lawn Memorial Park, Cypress.

== City Council ==
=== Tenure ===
Harby was a materials and supply executive for Richfield in 1939 when he defeated incumbent Robert S. MacAlister in Los Angeles City Council District 11, which at that time included the West Adams and Venice areas. He was supported by political leader Clifford Clinton and served through 1957—with one exception:

The single break came in 1942, when he fell out with Clinton, who seized on an incident (he discovered that Harby had used a city car for a trip out of state) to oust him from office. Harby said he had been given permission to use the vehicle and the City Council voted to confirm the use as official business. But the matter was taken to Superior Court, where Harby was removed from office.

The City Council appointed Dave Stannard to take his place in May 1942, but the next year, 1943, Harby was reelected by a vote of 6,392 for himself and 5,988 for Stannard. Harby kept winning elections—in 1949 he had no opponent—until 1957, when he was defeated by Karl L. Rundberg.

=== Controversies ===
==== Public housing ====
Harby switched his position from "yes" to "no" in December 1951 to block a City Council vote of 8 to 7 a proposed $100 million public-housing plan that had divided the city, with business and real-estate factions on one side and labor and progressive interests on the other. Harby explained his reason by saying:

I find upon further investigation that much of this proposed housing ... is not essentially a slum clearance project and buildings will be built on heretofore unoccupied territory. When you remove the slum-clearance element from public housing, there is nothing much left but Socialism.

Although he said his mail ran 10 to 1 in favor of his stand, he also displayed a letter containing a death threat, and his Halm Avenue home was "invaded" by protestors and picketed.

==== Art and music ====
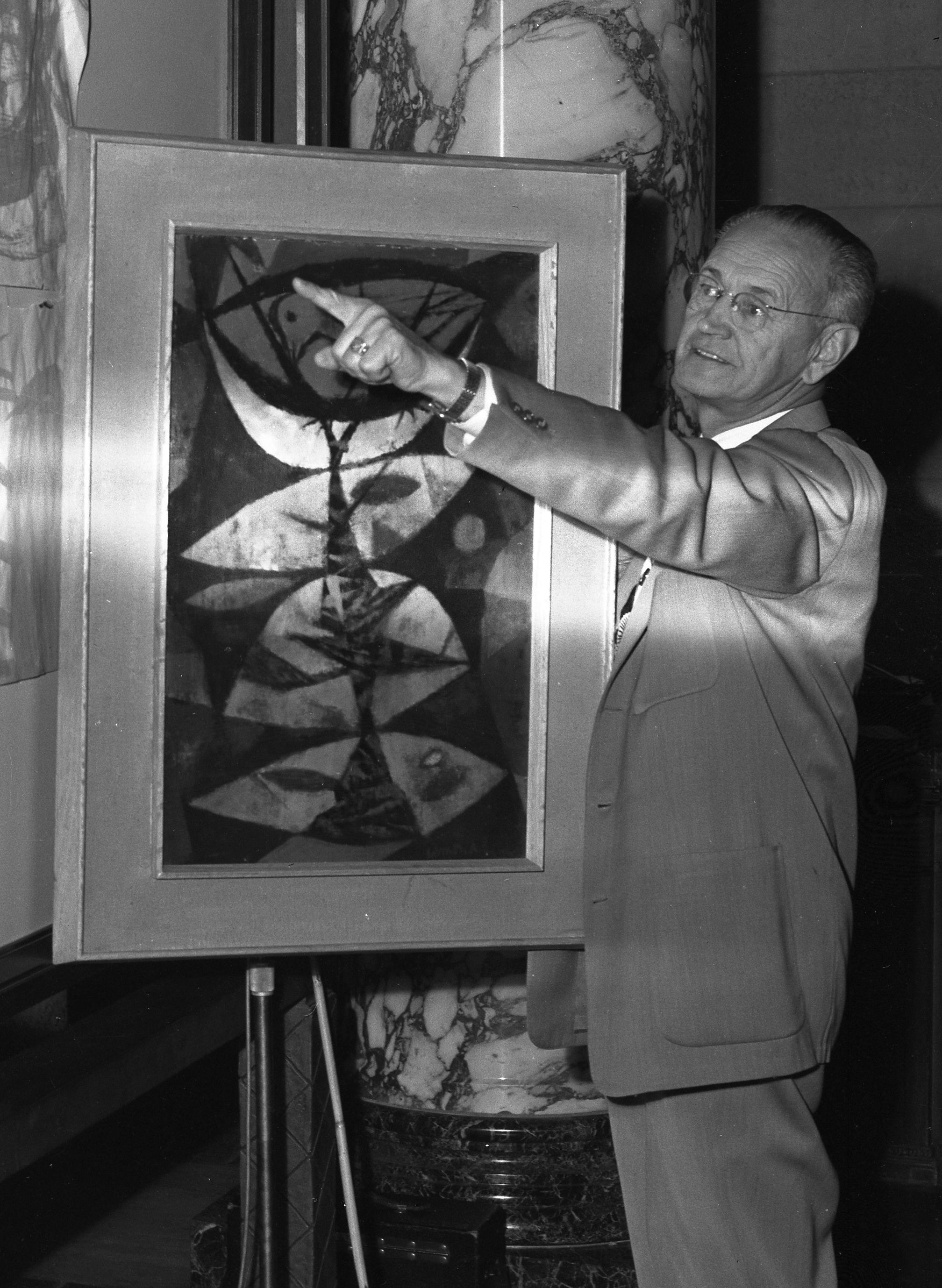
Harby debating on the painting Bird on the Moon in 1954

Painting to which Harby objected

Harby was also known for his opposition to modern art, sculpture and music. He objected to the City Art Department accepting a gift of a painting titled Bird on the Moon, noting that "I never saw any birds on the moon. Is this picture as crazy as it sounds?" He said the whole idea was "nuts, much like most of the rest of this so-called modern art."

He also was the principal opponent to a statuary group by sculptor Bernard Rosenthal that had been designed for the new Police Building across Main Street from the City Hall. He suggested that the "14-foot, 1000-pound brass-and-bronze statue be consigned to a smelter and its metal salvaged for a tablet memorializing policemen who have given their lives in service to the community." The statue in question represented "a father, young boy, mother and a babe in arms expressing the idea that the Police Department is dedicated to the protection of the family."

After Harby's motion was referred to committee, members of the Council marched in a body to view the sculpture. Harby climbed atop a scaffold, pointed to the figure representing the babe in arms and asked, "This is a baby?"

In a letter to the Los Angeles Times, Harby praised the artistry of singer Jeanette MacDonald and attacked modern music, which he called "gibberish" that "to me and millions of others is nothing but the echo of the drums of darkest Africa. ... Meaningless, purposeless and repulsive." He added: "savagery is no substitute for beauty."

==== Other ====
Harby points to baby in statuary group.

Mayor. He was appointed to a committee of five council members in May 1940 to call on Mayor Fletcher Bowron to complain about "persistent and erroneous" remarks the mayor made about the council in his radio addresses.

FDR painting. In October 1945, Harby and Rollin McNitt, chairman of the Democratic County Central Committee, physically interfered with the removal of a portrait of the late President Franklin D. Roosevelt from the space behind the City Council president's rostrum, as previously ordered by the council. It was later removed and drapes hung in the empty space to provide better acoustics.

Tokyo Rose. In December 1947, Harby authored a successful resolution in the Council asking Congress to "keep the female World War II Jap propagandist Tokyo Rose out of America." The resolution noted she was a one-time resident of Los Angeles.

Feud. He and Councilman Kenneth Hahn engaged in what was called a "feud" over various subjects, including their differences concerning the subject of continuing wartime rent control in Los Angeles, with Hahn favoring and Harby opposing. Harby also called a suggestion by Hahn for a pay raise for city employees "political prostitution in its lowest form." Harby used the same term, calling Hahn a "political prostitute" in a raucous debate over the fate of a $110-million-dollar public housing proposal for the city (Hahn in favor and Harby opposed; see above). At one point, Harby "reached over" and shoved Hahn back into his seat.

Bomb shelters. In January 1951 he broached the idea of converting the city's major storm drains into atomic air-raid shelters. The City Council asked the city's Board of Public Works to study the matter.

Anti-Communism. In October 1952, Harby joined a group of people supporting a House Committee on Un-American Activities probe into Communist sympathies among Los Angeles attorneys. Harby repeatedly took photographs of one of the anti-committee picketers who were also on the scene, "then made shaming signs with his finger and chided, 'You ought to be ashamed of yourself.'"

Political offices
Preceded by Robert S. MacAlister	Los Angeles City Council; 11th District; 1939–42	Succeeded by Dave Stannard
Preceded by Dave Stannard	Los Angeles City Council; 11th District; 1943–57	Succeeded by Karl L. Rundberg
