= Mike Bonin =

American politician (born 1967)

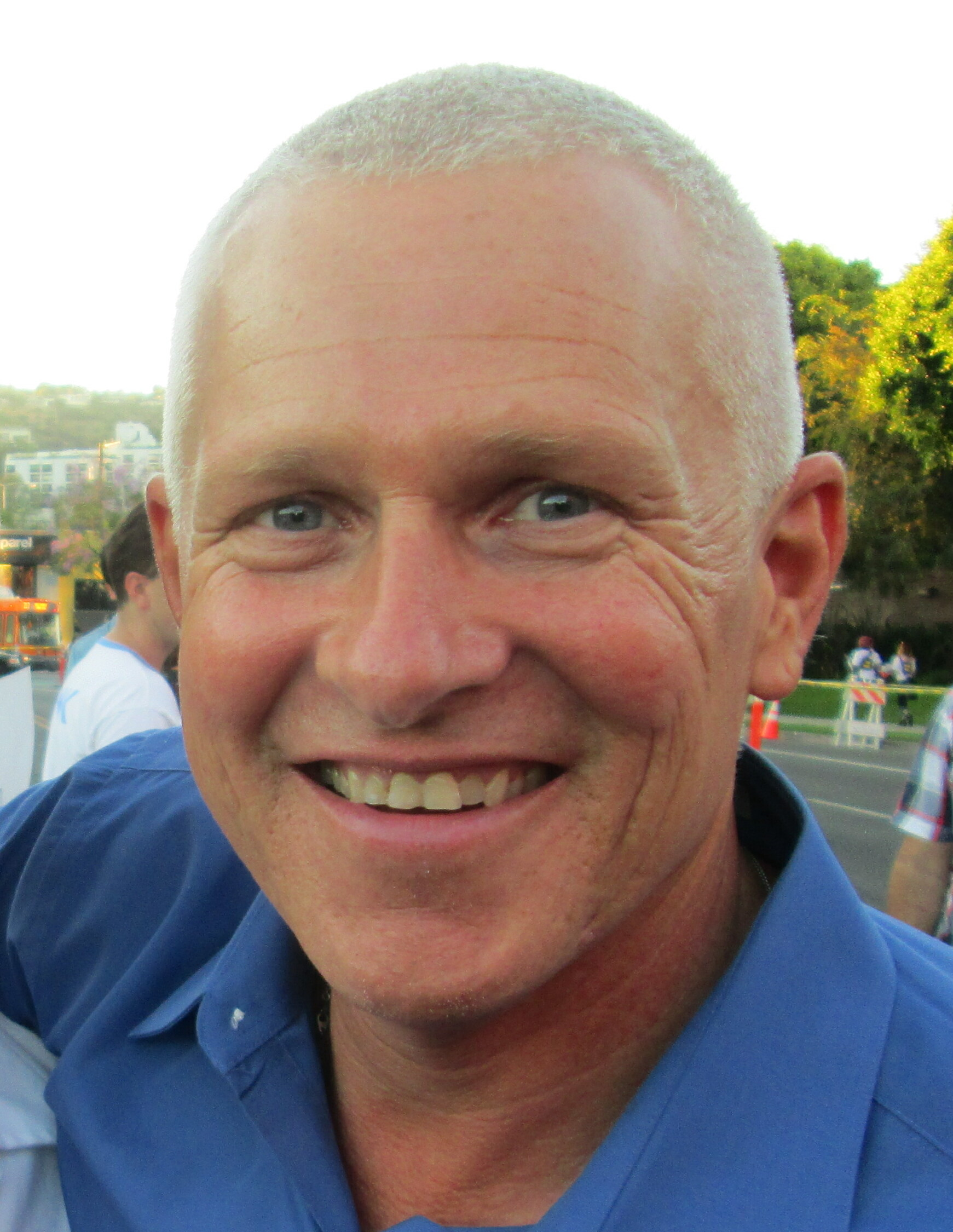
- Bonin in 2012

Member of the Los Angeles City Council from the 11th district
- In office July 1, 2013 – December 11, 2022
- Preceded by: Bill Rosendahl
- Succeeded by: Traci Park

Personal details
- Born: Michael Joseph Bonin; March 19, 1967 (age 59) Clinton, Massachusetts, U.S.
- Party: Democratic
- Education: Harvard University
- Website: www.mikebonin.com

Michael Bonin (born March 19, 1967) is an American politician who served as a member of the Los Angeles City Council for the 11th district from 2013 to 2022. A progressive member of the Democratic Party, he was previously a reporter and a council staffer.

== Early life ==
Bonin graduated from Clinton High School in Clinton, Massachusetts, in 1985. His grandfather William P. Constantino was a state representative and a judge in the town of Clinton. His uncle William P. Constantino Jr. also served as a state representative. He had a sister, Maureen, who died of cancer in 2010.

== Career ==
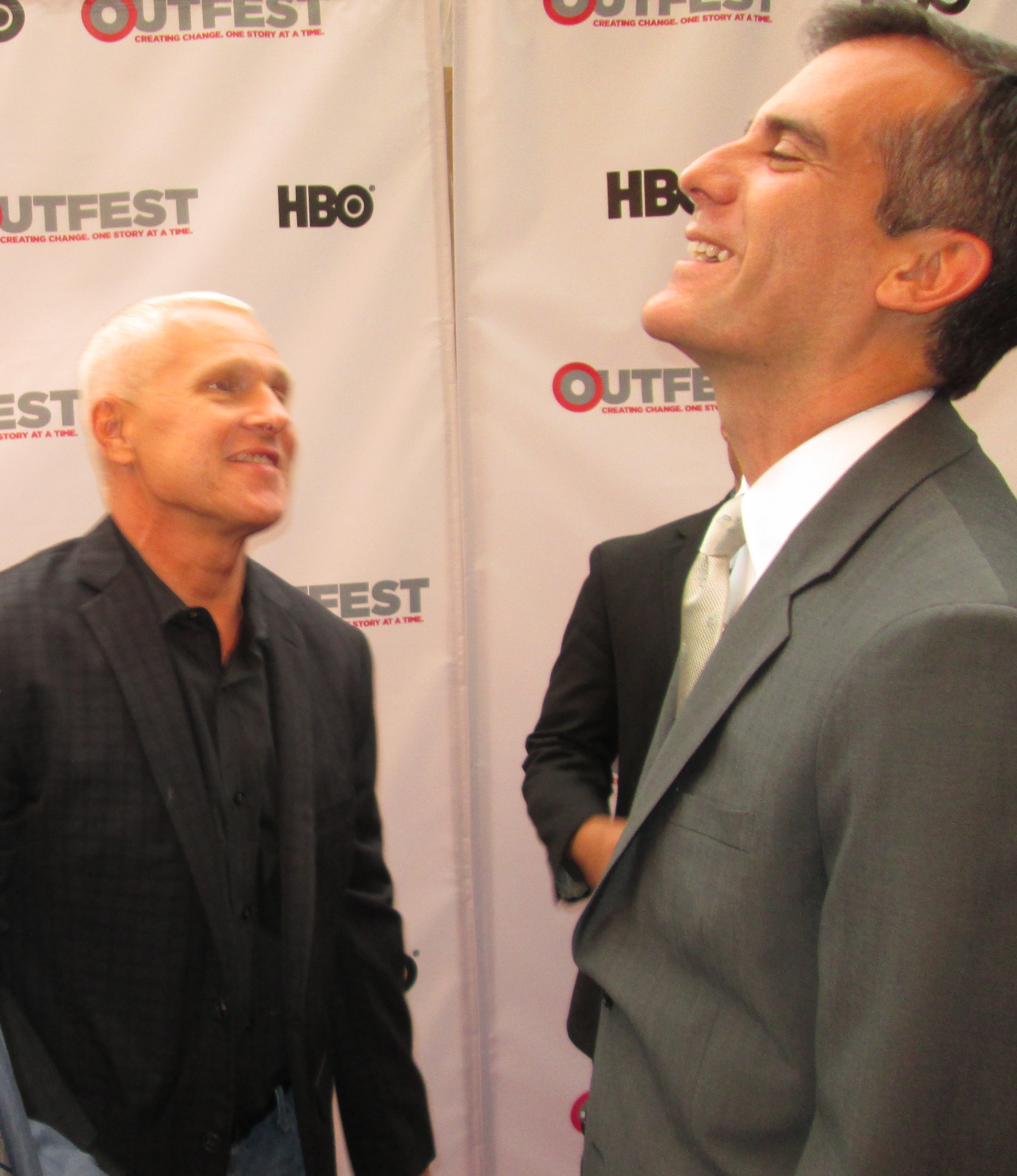
Bonin and Mayor Eric Garcetti in 2012.

From 1989 to 1996 Bonin worked as a reporter at Springfield Newspapers in Springfield, Massachusetts, and Wave Newspapers in Los Angeles.

=== Political career ===
Bonin began his political career in Los Angeles city politics in 1996, joining the staff of L.A. City Councilmember Ruth Galanter. During his seven years with Galanter he worked as a legislative deputy, district director, and deputy chief of staff. From 2003 to 2004 Bonin worked in the Office of Congresswoman Jane Harman as deputy chief of staff and district director. In 2005 Bonin managed Bill Rosendahl's successful campaign for L.A. city council. Rosendahl subsequently appointed Bonin as his chief of staff.

During the summer of 2012, Rosendahl announced he had been diagnosed with cancer, and in October announced he would not seek reelection. He endorsed Bonin. Bonin won the subsequent election with 61% of the vote. Bonin was re-elected on March 7, 2017, defeating Mark Ryavec and Robin Rudisill. Bonin won with 71% of votes cast supporting him.

=== Tenure ===
Bonin was appointed Chair of the City Council's Transportation Committee, and serves as a member of the Los Angeles County Metropolitan Transportation Authority Board of Directors

On September 4, 2013, Bonin and his colleague Paul Koretz introduced the Los Angeles Fracking Moratorium to the City Council. The motion, which instructed the City Attorney to draft an ordinance that would temporarily ban "unconventional oil and gas drilling" techniques like fracking in Los Angeles until they can be proven safe, was approved by the City Council on February 28, 2014.

On February 18, 2014, Bonin and his colleagues Nury Martinez and Curren Price introduced legislation to establish a living wage of $15.37 per hour for employees at large hotels in Los Angeles. The bill was approved by the Council by a 12-3 vote, setting one of the highest minimum wages in the country.

In the fall of 2014, Bonin was one of four co-authors of legislation that would raise the minimum wage in Los Angeles. While supportive of Mayor Eric Garcetti's initial proposal to incrementally increase the minimum wage to $13.25 per hour by 2017, Bonin called for extending the proposed increase to reach $15.25 by 2019.

On September 15, 2017, a campaign for a recall election to remove Councilman Bonin from office was launched. The recall campaign failed to receive support from the required five individuals and was abandoned before it ever formally began.

A second recall campaign was launched in 2021. In November 2021, the group sponsoring the recall claimed that it had submitted sufficient signatures to trigger a recall election. On January 18, 2022, the Los Angeles City Clerk announced that although the recall group received 25,965 valid signatures, it fell 1,350 short of the number needed to trigger a recall election.

On January 26, 2022, Bonin announced that he would not seek reelection for a third term, citing depression and health issues. On October 9, 2022, leaked audio came out that records fellow council members Nury Martinez and Kevin de León making racist remarks about Bonin and his son.

==== Actions on housing ====
In 2018, Bonin supported the construction of A Bridge Home Venice Beach homeless shelter in a residential area of Venice. Amid resistance from residents, the facility was constructed at a cost of $8.5 million dollars. It provided 100 beds for homeless adults and 54 beds for transitional age youth.

In 2019, Bonin opposed California Senate Bill 50, a zoning reform bill which would allow for dense housing near rail stations, major bus routes and areas with high concentrations of jobs. Bonin said that more housing supply would "ravage" the Del Rey neighborhood and cause the displacement of low-income Latino renters.

In May 2021, Bonin sponsored a motion to study situating temporary homeless housing in parking lots near Will Rogers State Beach. This prompted criticism by some residents.

In August 2021, Bonin voted for a resolution condemning California Senate Bill 9, which would permit multi-family housing in some of the areas zoned exclusively for single-family housing.

=== Post-elected office ===
Bonin became executive director of the Pat Brown Institute for Public Affairs at Cal State Los Angeles in May 2025. He also hosts two podcasts about Los Angeles news and politics with the LA Forward Institute, a progressive thinktank, and taught classes about politics at Occidental College and led a Fellow's study group at the USC Center for the Political Future.

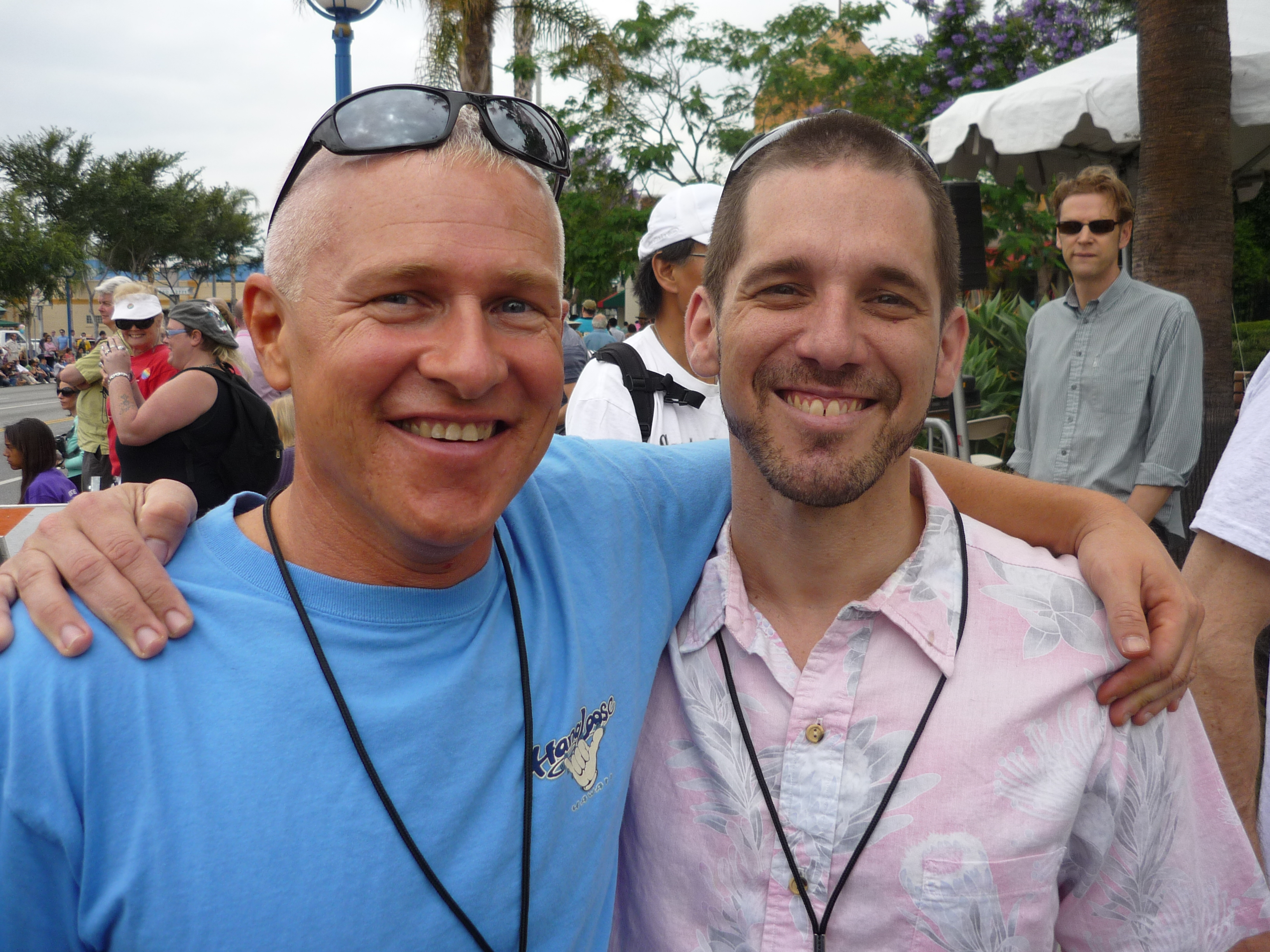
Bonin with his husband, Sean Arian, in 2009.

== Personal life ==
Bonin lives in Mar Vista with his husband, Sean Arian, whom he married in 2014. Mayor Eric Garcetti performed the wedding ceremony. Arian is founder and president of EOS Consulting and also serves as the founder and chief strategist for Bixel Exchange, a technology startup incubator created by the Los Angeles Area Chamber of Commerce and Small Business Development Center. The couple has an adopted son who is black. Bonin is Catholic and a member of St. Monica Catholic Church in Santa Monica.
