= Charles Winchester Breedlove =

American actor and politician

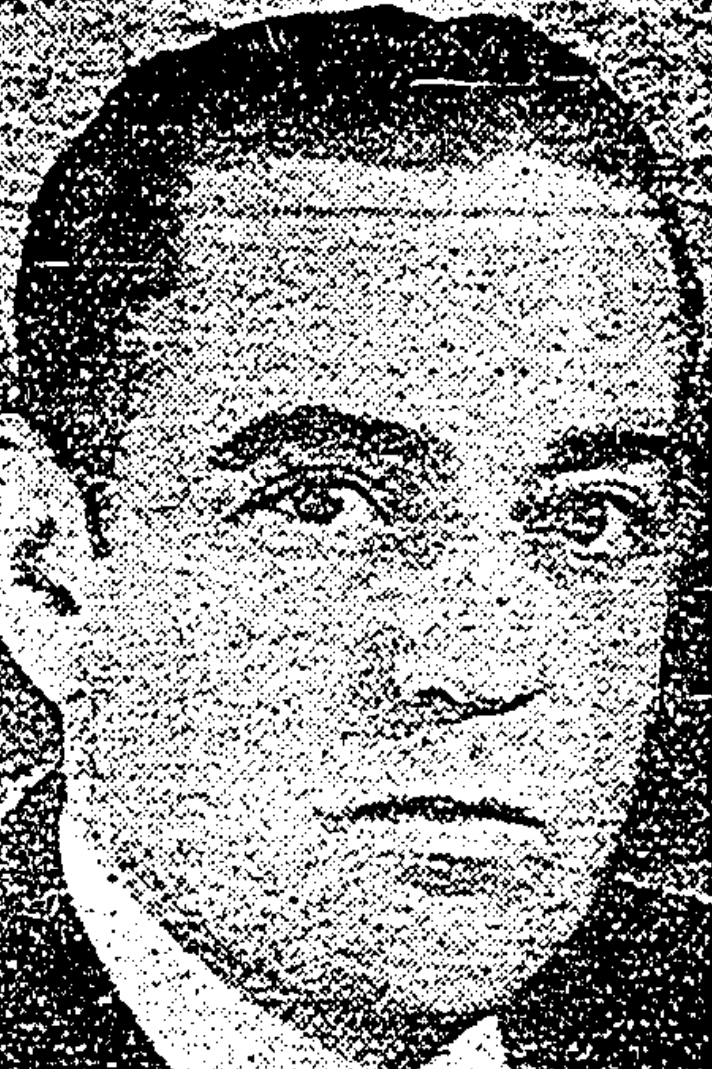
- Breedlove in the 1930s

Member of the Los Angeles City Council for the 11th district
- In office July 1, 1933 – April 26, 1934
- Preceded by: Clarence E. Coe
- Succeeded by: Robert S. MacAlister

Personal details
- Born: November 14, 1898; Fort Smith, Arkansas
- Died: April 26, 1934 (aged 35); West Adams, Los Angeles

Charles Winchester Breedlove (November 14, 1898 – April 26, 1934) was an invalided U.S. Marine, an actor and a motion picture director who died in office while a member of the Los Angeles City Council in the 1930s.

== Biography ==
Breedlove was born on November 14, 1898, in Fort Smith, Arkansas, to John Breedlove and Carrie Bruton. He was one of 12 siblings, the others being James Willoughby, John Chisholm, Wharton Hicks, Napoleon, Otho, Robert Bruton, William Otway, Cassie, Walton David and Willard Stapler.

After graduating from Fort Smith High School, Breedlove joined the U.S. Marine Corps in June 1917 and went to officer training school in Fort Sill, Oklahoma, after which he was commissioned as a second lieutenant. He was injured in action during World War I and spent six months in Walter Reed Hospital. He was discharged in July 1919.

He moved to Los Angeles in August 1919, where he was married to Ester Egan in 1919; they had two daughters, Signa and June. In that city he joined Metro Goldwyn Studios, where he was an actor and assisted in directing motion pictures, then became a director of educational features. He left MGM in January 1929, and moved to Duluth, Minnesota, where for six months he directed play revivals for a little theater group. He next went to China to direct educational films, then returned to Los Angeles, where he directed films with Educational Studio.

Breedlove died at his home, 3003 Chesapeake Avenue, in the West Adams district on April 26, 1934, after two heart attacks that day, his cardiac condition having been diagnosed when he was discharged from the Marines. His funeral service at Patriotic Hall with full military honors, was attended by more than a thousand mourners. Burial followed at Rosedale Cemetery.

== City council ==
=== Election ===
Breedlove was identified as an "outspoken liberal" who was "never in doubt about where he stands—nor reluctant to make it known." He was called "an expert public speaker" whose campaign for Los Angeles City Council District 11 in 1933 against incumbent Clarence E. Coe "made considerable headway by reason of this talent." In 1933, the 11th District council member represented the Westside and Palms areas, from the ocean as far east as La Brea Avenue. Breedlove beat Coe in the final election by 11,275 votes to 9,082.

=== Controversies ===
In his first few months in office, Breedlove's eligibility to hold his seat was challenged by a taxpayer, John S. Carll, who said that Breedlove had not lived in the district for the preceding two years, as required by law. Breedlove testified he left Los Angeles early in 1929, went to Duluth, Minnesota, but returned seven months later. He then went to Tulsa, Oklahoma, "to fulfill a theatrical engagement," and in March 1931 went to China but returned "after a few months abroad." He did admit that in obtaining his passport, he gave Muldrow, Oklahoma, as his "permanent home." The judge hearing the case ruled in Breedlove's favor.

Breedlove was a determined supporter of the tango card games being run at Venice Beach in his district "and spreading throughout the city." He made appearances before women's clubs, where he compared the games to "old-fashioned lotto and to the elements of chance in bridge games, which he intimated some of the ladies probably played for '25 cents a corner.'" He said that taxing the tango parlors would bring needed revenue to the city.

He similarly opposed a City Council decision to outlaw the fad of "walkathons" within the city of Los Angeles—similar to a dance marathon.

Preceded by Clarence E. Coe	Los Angeles City Council; 11th District; 1933–34	Succeeded by Robert S. MacAlister
