= Dave Stannard =

American journalist

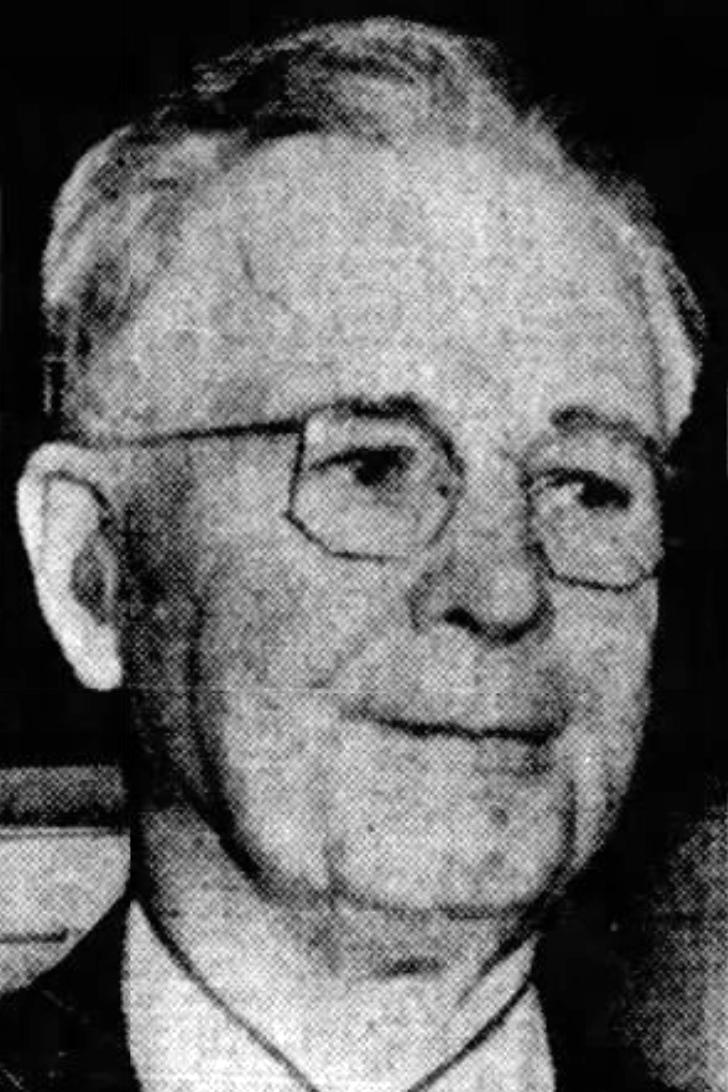
- Stannard in 1942

Member of the Los Angeles City Council for the 11th district
- In office May 18, 1942 – June 30, 1943
- Preceded by: Harold Harby
- Succeeded by: Harold Harby

Personal details
- Born: David Samuel Benjamin Stannard; March 31, 1881 England
- Died: July 14, 1959 (aged 78)
- Political party: Democratic

David Samuel Benjamin Stannard (March 31, 1881 – June 14, 1959) was a journalist and advertising representative named to the Los Angeles, California, City Council in 1942 to replace Harold Harby, who had been stripped of his seat because he used a city car to go on vacation in Montana.

== Biography ==
Stannard was born in England of American parents around 1882 and was educated in Saint Louis, Missouri. He came to Los Angeles while young and worked for newspapers in 1915—including the Los Angeles Express and Tribune—and for the Associated Press. He was employed later by an advertising agency that had the Los Angeles Department of Water and Power as one of its accounts. Living at 8932 West Adams Boulevard, at Fairfax Avenue, he was married and had one son.

== City Council ==
=== Tenure ===
Council Member Harold Harby of Los Angeles City Council District 11 was ousted from his seat after a grand jury indictment and a trial. which found him guilty of using a city car to take a vacation in Colorado. The City Council had the duty to appoint a replacement to fill out Harby's term until the next election. It interviewed some twenty candidates, held several secret meetings and finally made the appointment on May 18, 1942, for the term that would end on election day in 1943. Stannard was sworn in immediately. The district covered the West Los Angeles and Venice areas.

He ran for election in 1943 and was chosen by the voters to fill Harby's unexpired term—a period of just a few weeks—but a resurrected Harby himself stood in the same election for the two-year term following and was chosen in a close vote over Stannard.

=== Positions ===
Defense. In reacting to the then-current Battle of Savo Island and considering additional appropriations for civil defense, Stannard told the council that Southern California was a "hostile area" and that the city should not suffer because of lack of preparations.

Wells. Stannard submitted a resolution that would have forbidden drilling of oil wells within one-half mile of the ocean beach "to prevent future impairment."

Preceded by Harold Harby	Los Angeles City Council; 11th District; 1942–43	Succeeded by Harold Harby
