= Marvin Braude =

American politician (1920–2005)

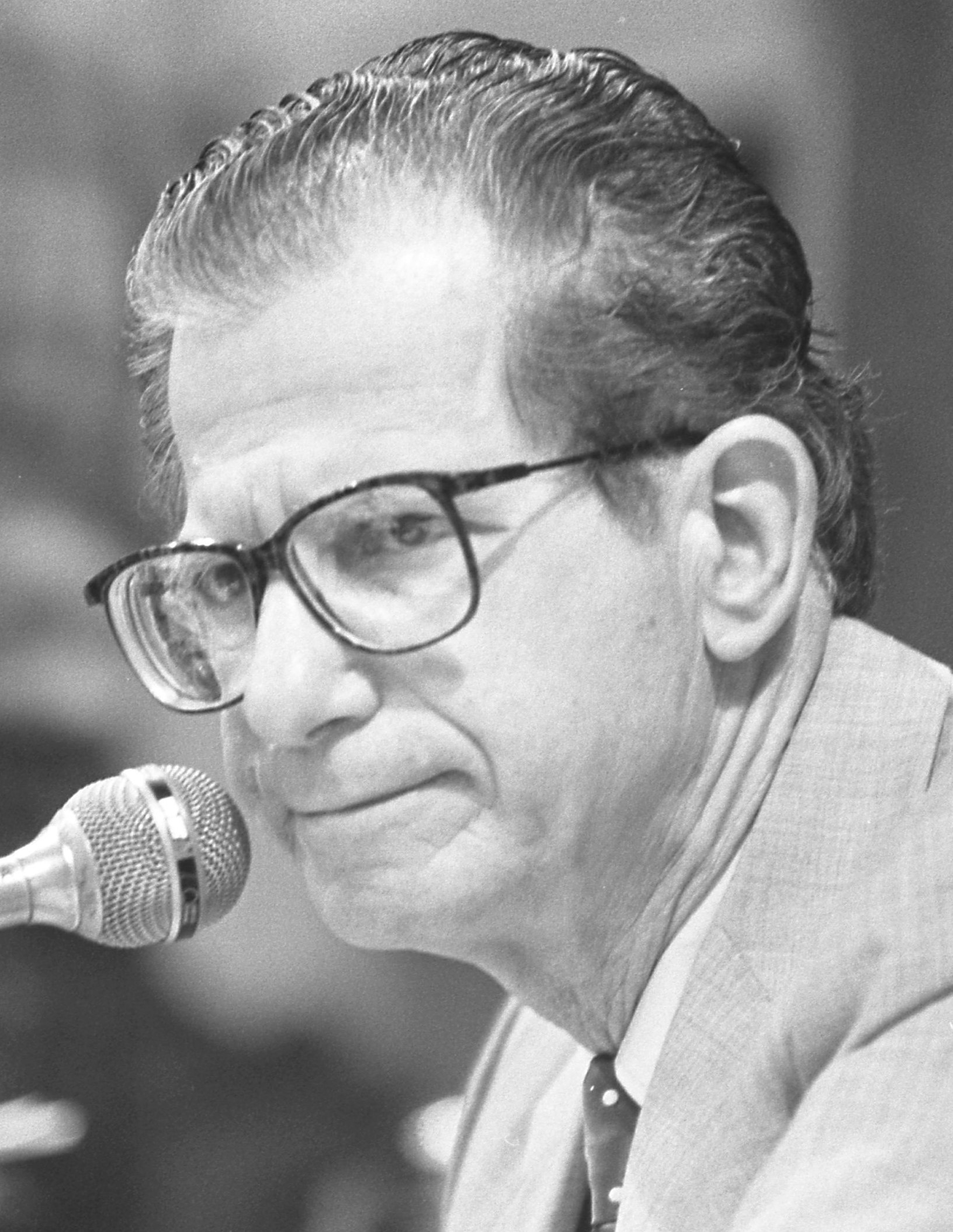
- Braude in 1988

Member of the Los Angeles City Council for the 11th district
- In office July 1, 1965 – June 30, 1997
- Preceded by: Karl L. Rundberg
- Succeeded by: Cindy Miscikowski

President Pro Tempore of the Los Angeles City Council
- In office July 1, 1987 – June 30, 1989
- Preceded by: Joan Milke Flores
- Succeeded by: Joel Wachs

Personal details
- Born: August 11, 1920; Chicago, Illinois, U.S.
- Died: December 7, 2005 (aged 85); Rancho Mirage, California, U.S.
- Political party: Democratic

Marvin Braude (August 11, 1920 – December 7, 2005) was a member of the Los Angeles City Council for 32 years, between 1965 and 1997—the third-longest-serving council member in the history of the city.

During his tenure on the Los Angeles City Council, he led opposition to new housing construction and development as part of a "slow-growth movement." In 1988, the Los Angeles Times described him as "council's strongest critic of growth." He proposed Proposition U, a successful 1986 ballot initiative, that the Los Angeles Times called "the largest one-shot effort to limit development in the city's history."

He was “a champion of bike paths,” advocated for protecting the open space of the Santa Monica Mountains, and successfully pushed the city to ban smoking in restaurants and government buildings.

== Biography ==
Braude was born on August 11, 1920, in Chicago, Illinois, the only son of Benjamin and Rose Braude, and attended the University of Illinois in 1937. He graduated from the University of Chicago in 1941 with a bachelor's degree in political science. He was a research assistant with the Cowles Commission for Research in Economics in 1941 and an instructor in social science at the University of Chicago in 1942. He owned and operated small businesses and a small investment firm until he was elected to the City Council in 1965.

Braude was married to Marjorie Sperry of Chicago on September 26, 1948; they went to Yosemite on their honeymoon and decided then to move to California, which they did in 1951. She became a medical doctor and specialized in psychiatry. The couple moved to the Brentwood district of Los Angeles in 1952. They had two children, Liza, born in May 1953, and Ann, born in July 1955. Marjorie Braude, who became head of the Los Angeles Domestic Violence Task Force, died one month after her husband.

He was co-founder and first president of the Santa Monica Mountains Regional Park Association, founder of Capital for Small Business in Los Angeles and president of the Crestwood Hills Association.

He was described as being "professorial, cranky and wonkish . . . abrupt and cantakerous, especially with those who stood in his way." "The polyester suits he ordered from Sears, Roebuck & Co. catalogs were one of his trademarks. He brought health food in plastic containers to the banquets he was obliged to attend."

Braude died at the age of 84 on December 7, 2005, in Rancho Mirage, California, after breaking his leg in a fall and contracting pneumonia while in the hospital. He chose to be cremated, said his daughter Ann, because he believed using open space for cemeteries was "poor land-use policy." A memorial service was held at University Synagogue in Brentwood, Los Angeles, and donations were asked for the Santa Monica Mountains Conservancy.

== City Council ==
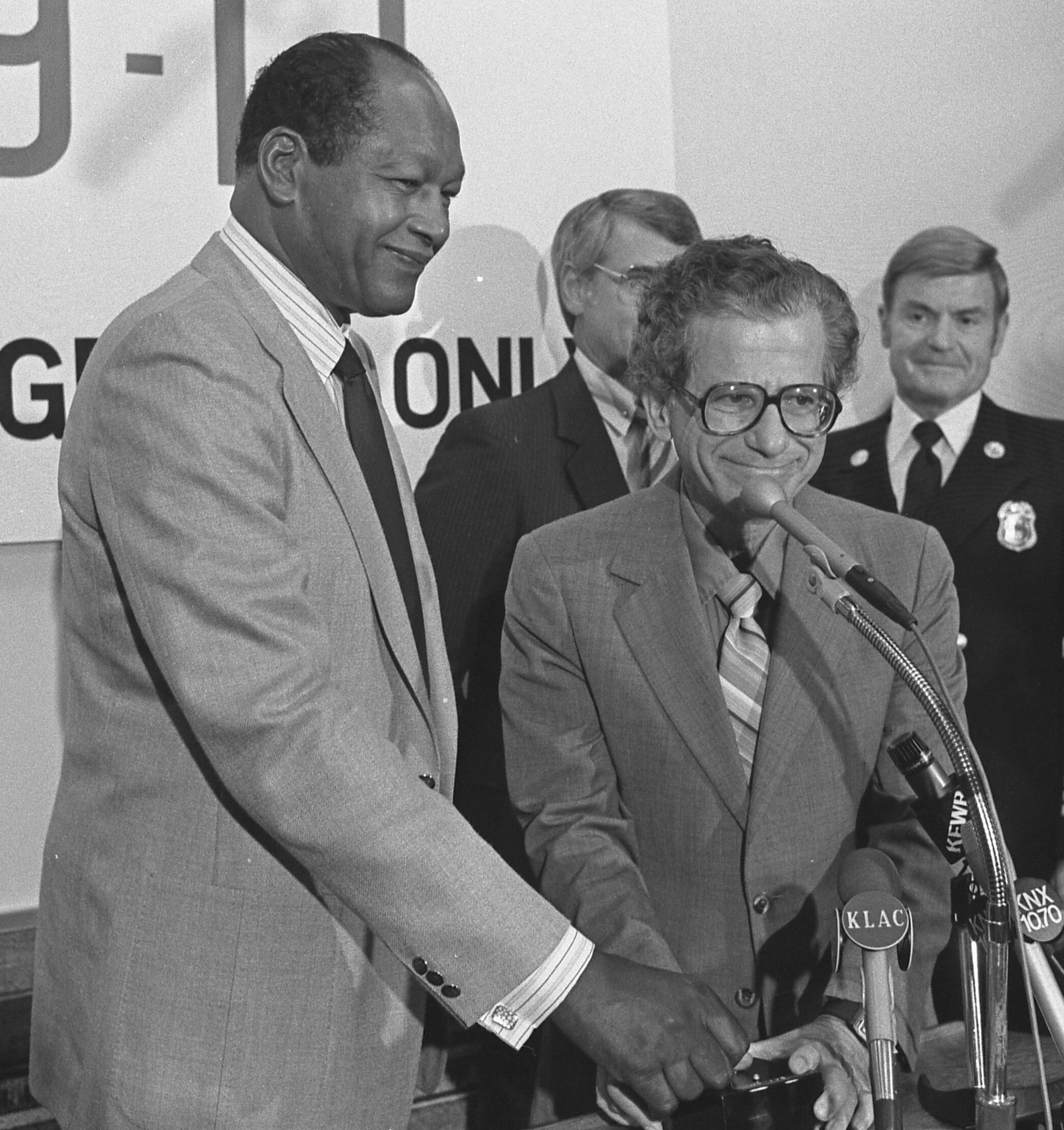
Braude with Mayor Tom Bradley flipping "on switch" for 911 emergency telephone system, 1984.

=== Elections ===
In April 1965, Braude took on conservative incumbent Karl L. Rundberg in Los Angeles City Council District 11 and finished the primary election with less than half the votes of Rundberg (11,033 against 22,397), but in the May 1965 final, a "wave of public indignation over plans to carve a major highway across the Santa Monica Mountains" carried him into office: he beat the veteran Rundberg by 22,023 votes to 18,976.

Braude was not seriously threatened in succeeding elections until 1997, when he faced "a strong challenge" from Cindy Miscikowski, his former chief of staff, among others. In 1996 he said he would begin to donate large sums of money from his $100,000 salary and his extensive financial portfolio to fund city projects within his district if he were reelected. He decided, however, to retire instead of campaigning.

=== Positions ===
- Mulholland Drive. Braude said in 1967 that he would continue a push for Mulholland Drive to be turned into a major parkway, with hiking and riding trails, picnic and camping facilities and other things of scenic, historic and recreational value.
- Bike trails. An avid bicyclist, Braude worked to establish bicycle paths along the Pacific Ocean beachfront, in 1968 leading a contingent of 350 bike enthusiasts from Venice to Playa del Rey and in 1974 leading 175 bikers along the 19-mile bikeway that the county was building along the beach, only to be stopped by sheriff's deputies at the entrance to a Marina apartment complex in what the owner contended was an "unlawful invasion of private property."
- Auto Club. Braude ran unsuccessfully for a seat on the board of directors of the Automobile Club of Southern California after he learned that the club had spent $22,000 in 1970 to help defeat a state ballot proposition that would have allowed some state gasoline tax receipts to go for fighting smog and building rapid transit, which he favored, instead of being strictly limited to laying streets and building highways.
- Slow-growth initiative. With Councilman Zev Yaroslavsky, Braude was the author of Proposition U, a ballot initiative that was designed to make 75% of Los Angeles off limits to commercial development. The measure passed by a wide margin in November 1986.
- Gun control. He called for a "broad-range" attack on the "widespread ownership and use of guns"—saying he would push for legislation to prevent gun violence. "This is something that will take four of six or maybe even 10 years," he said. Council members Jackie Goldberg, Mark Ridley-Thomas, Ruth Galanter and Laura Chick seconded his proposal.
- Leaf blowers. On two separate occasions, he asked the City Council to ban the use of noisy gas-powered leaf-blowers, used by professional gardeners.
- Suit blocked. In 1990 a Superior Court judge ruled that Braude's position as a City Council member precluded him from being able to sue as a private citizen against construction of the Watt City Center, a two-story office complex planned for Downtown Los Angeles,
- Smoking ban. In 1973, he first introduced an ordinance against smoking in restaurants and government buildings. It didn't pass then, so he reintroduced the measure in 1991. "If doctors and the vast majority of Los Angeles nonsmokers will rise up and support this proposal, we can tell the tobacco industry to shove off and take its sleazy act back to North Carolina," he said. This time it passed.
- Reduction in car pollution. In 1996, Braude presented a City Council award to General Motors for its upcoming $35,000 GM EV1, after having called for non-polluting car market in 1988.

== Post-council ==
In September 1997 Braude became at the age of 76 a "distinguished practitioner in residence" at the University of Southern California, giving lectures and advising students on research projects and papers.

== Legacy ==
The Marvin Braude Mulholland Gateway Park in Tarzana, California, the Marvin Braude Constituent Service Center at the Government Center in Van Nuys and the Marvin Braude Bike Trail (formerly the South Bay and Santa Monica Bike Paths) are named after him.

Preceded by Karl Rundberg	Los Angeles City Council; 11th District; 1965–97	Succeeded by Cindy Miscikowski
Preceded by Joan Milke Flores	President Pro Tempore of the Los Angeles City Council; 1987–95	Succeeded by Joel Wachs
