= J. C. Barthel =

American civil engineer

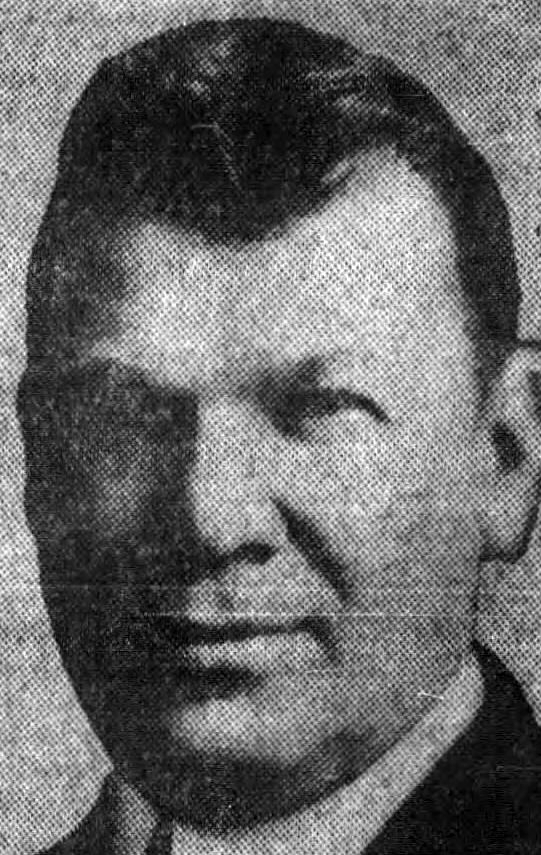
- Barthel in 1931

Member of the Los Angeles City Council for the 11th district
- In office July 1, 1929 – June 30, 1931
- Preceded by: Peirson Mitchell Hall
- Succeeded by: Clarence E. Coe

Personal details
- Born: Julius Carl Barthel; September 29, 1873; Missouri
- Died: April 2, 1952 (aged 78)
- Political party: Republican

Julius Carl Barthel (29 September 1873 – 2 April 1952) was an American civil engineer and politician who was a Los Angeles City Council member from 1929 to 1931.

== Biography ==
Barthel was born in Missouri to German immigrants. He "prepared plans for the docks and other water-front improvements in the San Francisco Bay district" for the War Department. He moved to the Palms district of Los Angeles in 1906 and lived at 9001 National Boulevard. In 1913, he helped organize a state convention in Venice for the Fraternal Order of Eagles.

In the 1920s he was in the real-estate business and was on a committee that worked to bring University of California, Los Angeles (UCLA) to its present home in the Westwood district of West Los Angeles.

In May 1922, Barthel was among forty-six "asserted Klansmen" who were questioned by a grand jury investigating the Ku Klux Klan in the wake of the shooting death of a police constable during a Klan terrorism incident in Inglewood, California.

He made an application to the city of Santa Monica in July 1922 for lease on a plot of land next to the "new government aviation field on Central Avenue" to establish "an aerial passenger service to San Francisco, by way of Santa Barbara, San Luis Obispo and Salinas." He said he "represented a group of associates who would operate four Fokker passenger-carrying planes on regular schedule." He was secretary of the Venice Chamber of Commerce in August 1922.

Barthel was married twice, his first marriage to Letitia Barthel ending in a 1923 divorce, in which Barthel agreed to pay Letitia $50 a month for life, according to a complaint she filed in court. Both Barthel and Letitia remarried, and Barthel ceased payment of the alimony to his first wife. There were two trials. At the second trial, Barthel testified that he had signed the original agreement only because "I feared for my life. She covered me with two guns and kept me prisoner in a room for eleven hours on Easter Sunday, 1923." She denied the claim, and Barthel was ordered by the judge to pay back alimony of $2,400 to Letitia, by then named Letitia Winn, and continue the monthly payments as agreed.

During a hearing that preceded the second trial, Barthel suffered a facial gash when Letitia Winn struck him in the hallway outside the court chamber. "Mrs. Winn moved toward Mrs. Barthel [his second wife, the former Harriet Cleveland], who dodged while spectators yelled for police. Bailiff Danielson dashed into the hall, and restrained Mrs. Winn while the Barthels took refuge in an elevator."

== Public life ==
=== Appointments ===
By 1914, Barthel had become the commissioner of supplies of Venice, California, which at that time was an independent city. He spoke before the Pomona, California, City Council on June 19 of that year on Venice's practice of burning garbage in an incinerator "which is supplied with a patent draft device for economical operation." He said the residue "makes a fine sub-structure for good road building in street improvements, being . . . more desirable and durable than rock."

Barthel was appointed postmaster in Venice by Democratic President Woodrow Wilson, serving from 1915 to 1924, and he was active in Democratic politics in 1916. He was ousted in 1924 in the Republican Calvin Coolidge administration, being replaced by Clyde W. Holbrook. Just a few months later, though, he was secretary and campaign manager for Coolidge in the Beach Cities area and remained active in Republican politics.

=== Elections ===
Barthel made his first run for the Los Angeles City Council in 1927, when the beach area was a part of Los Angeles City Council District 3. He finished fifth in a field of eight. In 1929, though, the beach area was placed in the 11th District, and Barthel defeated a challenge by former Councilman Lester R. Rice-Wray by a vote of 11,410 to 6,637, to win the race. His bid for reelection in 1931 failed with the victory of Clarence E. Coe, who had 5,450 votes to 4,444 for Charles W. Dempster (both nominated in the primary) and 3,621 for Barthel (who ran in the final as a write-in). He ran again in the 11th District in 1933, placing last in a field of nine, and in 1937, where he again finished last — third in a field of three, and in 1939 where he once more finished last, among five candidates.

In 1930, he ran unsuccessfully for the Los Angeles County Board of Supervisors in the 4th District.

=== Council actions ===
In January 1930, Barthel and seven other council members who had voted in favor of granting a rock-crushing permit in the Santa Monica Mountains were unsuccessfully targeted for recall on the grounds that the eight

have conspired with . . . Alphonzo Bell, Samuel Traylor and Chapin A. Day, all multi-millionaires, to grant this group a special spot zoning permit to crush and ship . . . from the high-class residential section of Santa Monica, limestone and rock for cement.

In February 1930, Barthel introduced a motion that would have required the City Council to issue drilling permits in the Venice oil district to "any and all requests" because "Venice people are capable of effecting their own contracts." The motion came as the result of a move by the council to place strict requirements on the oil-drilling companies, "whereby the municipality receives a royalty of the oil in proportion to the extent of land covered by public streets and alleys." The Times reported that

Several days ago it was discovered that one of the applicants [for an oil-drilling permit] is Mrs. Barthel under her maiden name of Harriet Cleveland.

As the council debated the Venice oil district proposal during the next sessions, Barthel studiously avoided debate on the issue, absenting himself from the council chambers when the votes were held.

It was reported in May 1930 that Barthel was among the City Council members who were taking free gasoline from L.A. police stations — in Barthel's case "as much as 300 gallons per month from the Wilshire station." He said he had permission to do so.

Barthel was among six council members who in May 1930 unsuccessfully opposed allocating funds to make a study of lowering the height of Bunker Hill, "which stands as a hindrance to traffic and a bar to development in the northwestern downtown territory."

Preceded by Peirson M. Hall	Los Angeles City Council; 11th District; 1929–31	Succeeded by Clarence E. Coe
