= Clarence E. Coe =

American politician

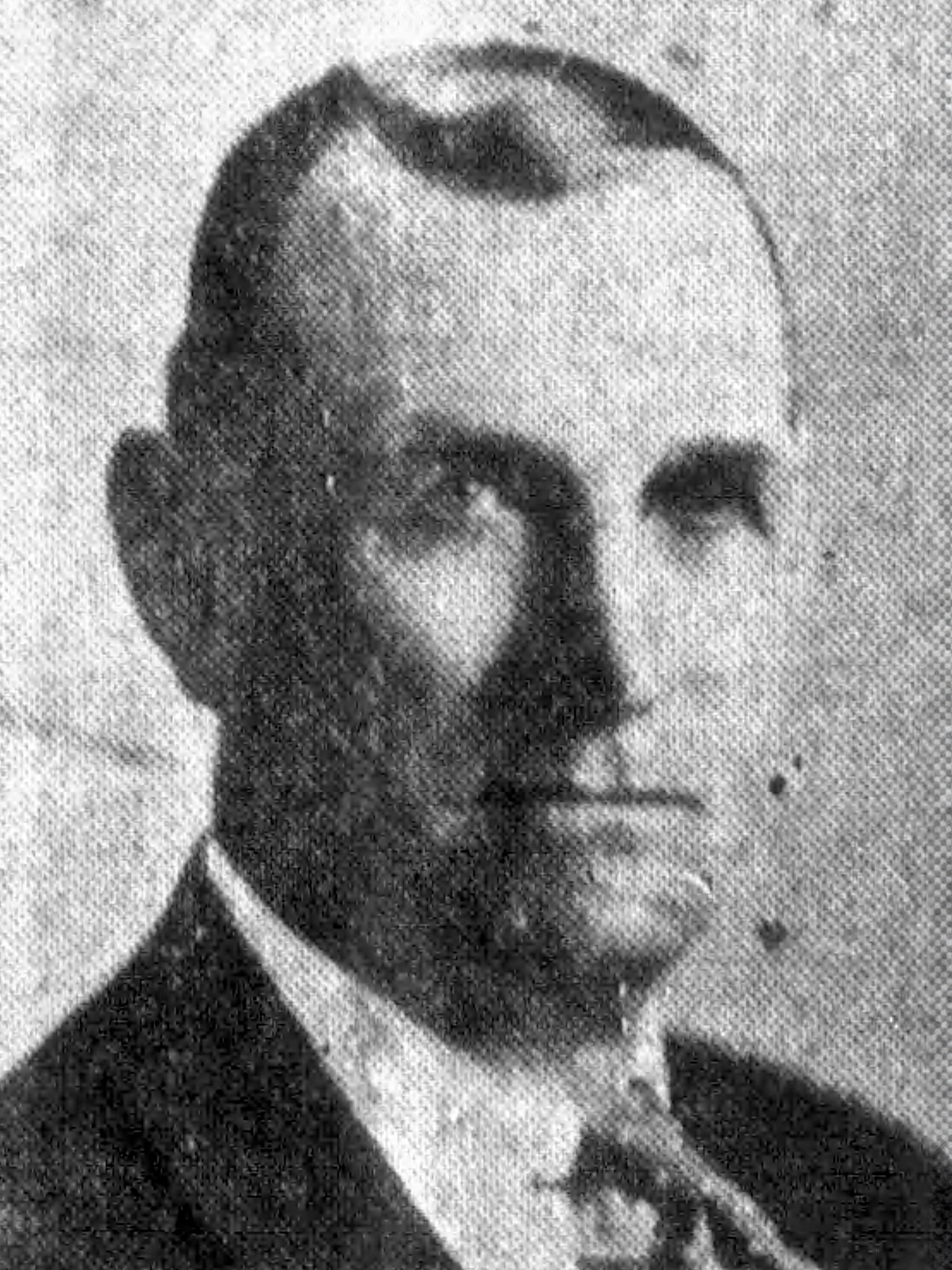
- Coe in 1931

Member of the Los Angeles City Council for the 11th district
- In office July 1, 1931 – June 30, 1933
- Preceded by: J. C. Barthel
- Succeeded by: Charles Winchester Breedlove

Personal details
- Born: January 23, 1873; Le Mars, Iowa
- Died: September 5, 1943 (aged 70); Los Angeles, California
- Political party: Republican
- Relatives: Descendants of Robert Coe

Clarence Elliot Coe (January 23, 1873 – September 5, 1943) was one of the first settlers and farmers in Palms, California, and a member of the Los Angeles Police Commission from 1929 to 1931 and of the Los Angeles City Council from 1931 to 1933.

== Biography ==
Coe was born on January 23, 1873, in Le Mars, Iowa, to Nathaniel Fenton Coe of Jamestown, New York, and Emma Stinton Coe of England. The Coe family was part of the 1882–23 United Brethren Church migration from Iowa to a virtually empty flatlands area in the La Ballona Valley about halfway between Los Angeles and the Pacific Ocean at Santa Monica. They took part in establishing the new community of Palms, California, which was laid out in 1886.

Clarence completed his education in the Palms public school, then went into farming, mostly lima beans. He was married on October 23, 1896, at the age of 23 to Laura Esther Bauder, 17, of Yolo County; they had four children, Thereon Elliott, Etta (Mrs. L.F. Arnold), Mildred (Mrs. Argyle Nelson) and Fenton. At first he lived in a small farm on Sawtelle Boulevard, but by August 1929, he had retired from farming and was living at 3743 Mentone Avenue in Palms, which had been annexed to Los Angeles in 1915. Over the years Coe purchased and developed more property, including the area which is now the city of Beverly Hills.

In 1901, Coe was the vice president of the Young People's Union of the United Brethren Churches of Southern California. Later, he was a trustee in the Palms School District, a member of the Republican County Central Committee and vice president of the Col. R.M. Baker Home for Retired Ministers. "In 1918 he became a director of the Citizens State Bank of Sawtelle, which had a branch in Palms and another in Brentwood Heights. When this bank was merged with the present Security-First National Bank in 1927, he retired also from active participation in its affairs, but he is still a member of the executive board of the Palms branch. . . ."

== Public service ==
=== Appointment and elections ===
Coe was appointed to the Police Commission by Mayor John C. Porter in May 1929. He served for two years until his election to the City Council from the 11th District in 1931. It was "A scattered area, due to its inclosure of county territory. Its eastern boundary is La Brea Avenue, its north boundary is Pico Boulevard, its southern boundary the city limits and its western boundary the ocean." He and Charles W. Dempster were nominated in the primary over J.C. Barthel, the incumbent, who ran in the final election as a write-in. Coe received the most votes in the final election, 5,460, over Dempster, with 4,444, and Barthel, with 3,621; thus he did not have a majority but was the victor anyway. He was defeated for reelection in 1933 by Charles Winchester Breedlove, 9,082 votes to Breedlove's 11,275.

=== Positions ===
- On the Police Commission, Coe consistently voted against the granting of permits for fortune tellers and clairvoyants, and when he got to the City Council, he submitted a resolution that would have outlawed palmistry, astrology and phrenology, calling them "unessential and unuseful."
- As a councilman, he "joined the group opposing the Mayor [Porter] and has been with that group ever since."
- Coe voted in summer 1931 against instructing the city attorney to appeal a judge's decision ordering the city to stop the practice of segregating its swimming pools by race. The vote was 6 in favor of an appeal and 8 opposed, including Coe, a vote that resulted in the pools' being immediately desegregated.

Preceded by J.C. Barthel	Los Angeles City Council; 11th District; 1931–33	Succeeded by Charles Winchester Breedlove
