= Traci Park =

American attorney and politician

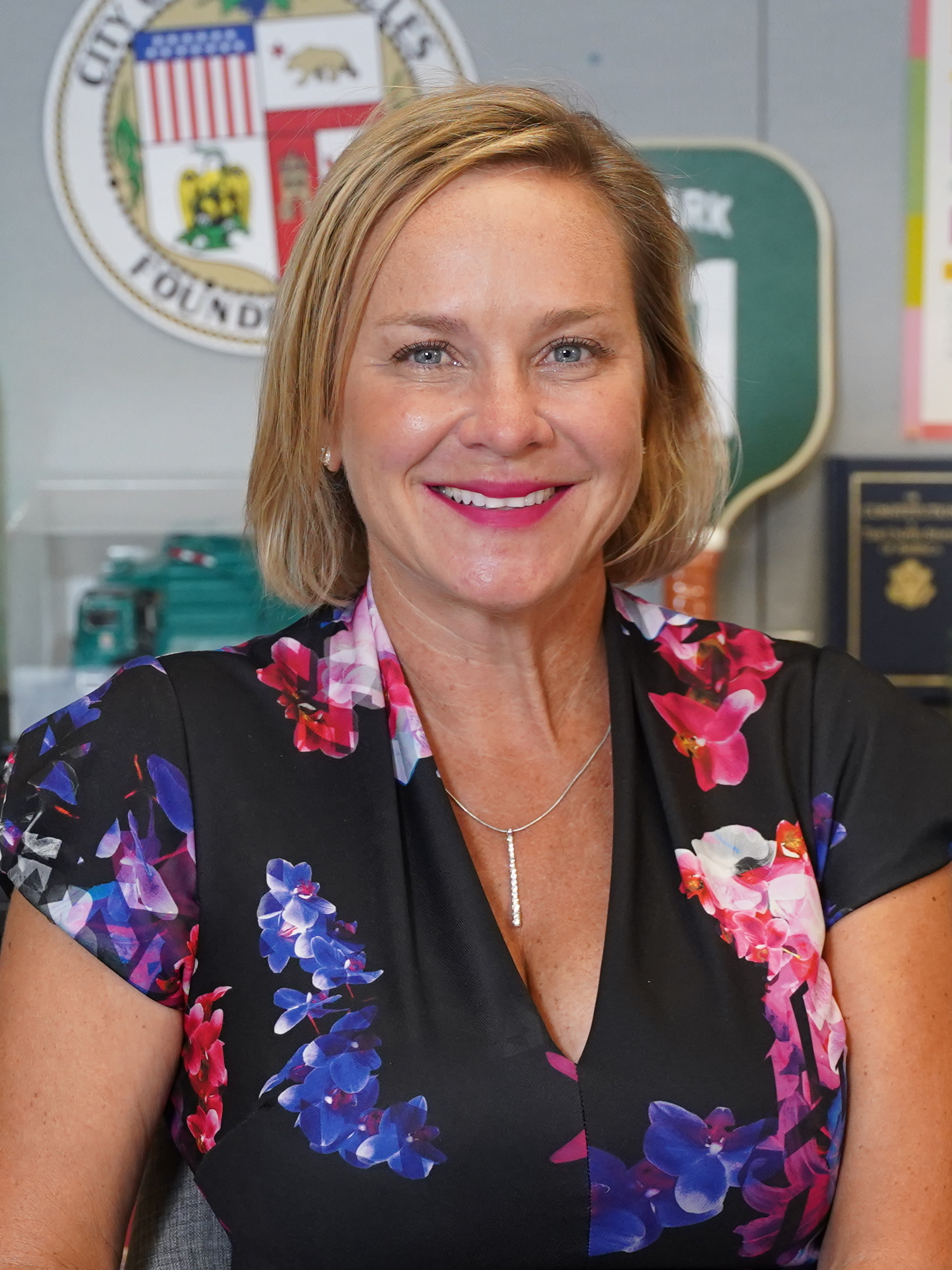
- Park in 2024

Member of the Los Angeles City Council from the 11th district
- Incumbent
- Assumed office December 12, 2022
- Preceded by: Mike Bonin

Personal details
- Born: Traci Irene Park; 1976 (age 49–50)
- Party: Democratic
- Other political affiliations: Republican (formerly)
- Education: Johns Hopkins University (BA); Loyola Marymount University (JD)

Traci Irene Park (born 1976) is an American attorney and politician who has served as a member of the Los Angeles City Council for the 11th district since 2022. Having entered the race to challenge incumbent Mike Bonin, Park won the election for the open seat upon Bonin's announcement of retirement. She has been described as the most conservative Democrat on the Los Angeles City Council.

== Early life and career ==
Park was raised in Downey, California, and Apple Valley, California. Her mother was a school secretary.

Park graduated from Johns Hopkins University in 1997 with a Bachelor's degree in history and a focus on the history of civil rights, later graduating from Loyola Law School in 2001 with a Juris Doctor. According to an interview with Park, she had to borrow money and work two jobs to afford undergraduate school, and then had to borrow more money to go to law school. In an interview, Park said she had wanted to be a lawyer since childhood, citing the television shows Matlock and Night Court as influences. In 2009, she started working for Burke, Williams and Sorensen, a law firm specializing in public entities.

Park was a registered Republican before switching to the Democratic Party years prior to her campaign. In 2015, Park moved to the Venice neighborhood in Los Angeles, drawn by what she called "the culture, the people and the lifestyle."

== Los Angeles City Council (2022—present) ==
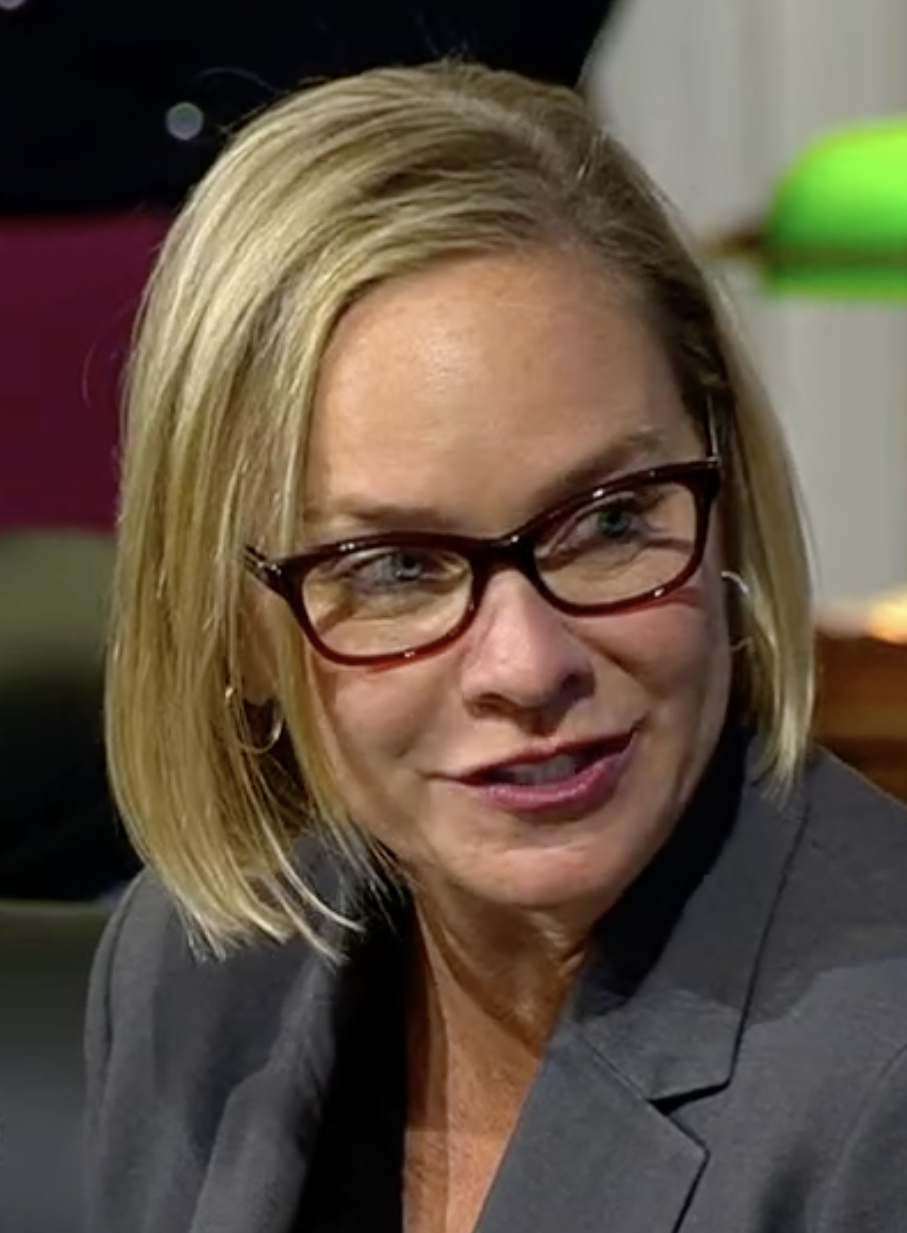
Park speaking to the Los Angeles City Council after her election in 2022.

=== Election ===
Park' political activism began in 2020 when she organized to block the city of Los Angeles from converting a Ramada Inn on her street into a shelter for homeless people. Park and her allies said she suggested restriction regarding who could occupy the former Ramada (individuals over 55 years old, families with children or women who has been victims of domestic violence). She joined a recall effort against incumbent Los Angeles City Council member Mike Bonin of the 11th district after his office declined all of Park's requests.

In July 2021, Park announced her candidacy for Los Angeles City Council, hoping to unseat incumbent Mike Bonin of the 11th district. After Bonin announced his retirement, the seat became open. Both Park and Erin Darling advanced to the general election, with Park narrowly behind Darling in the results, resulting in a runoff election.

During the campaigns, Darling criticized Park for representing the city of Anaheim against a city employee who accused a supervisor of using the N-word; Park countered by accusing Darling of representing "unsavory criminal defendants." Park also criticized Darling for his association with Bonin, as well as Bonin's record with homelessness in the district. In the runoff election, Park defeated Darling by six percent.

During her election campaign, Park opposed converting two city-owned parking lots on Venice Boulevard into 140 housing units for the homeless, as the project was in a tsunami zone. Park's election, along with the elections of council members Eunisses Hernandez and Katy Yaroslavsky, led to record-breaking six women on the Los Angeles City Council.

=== Tenure ===
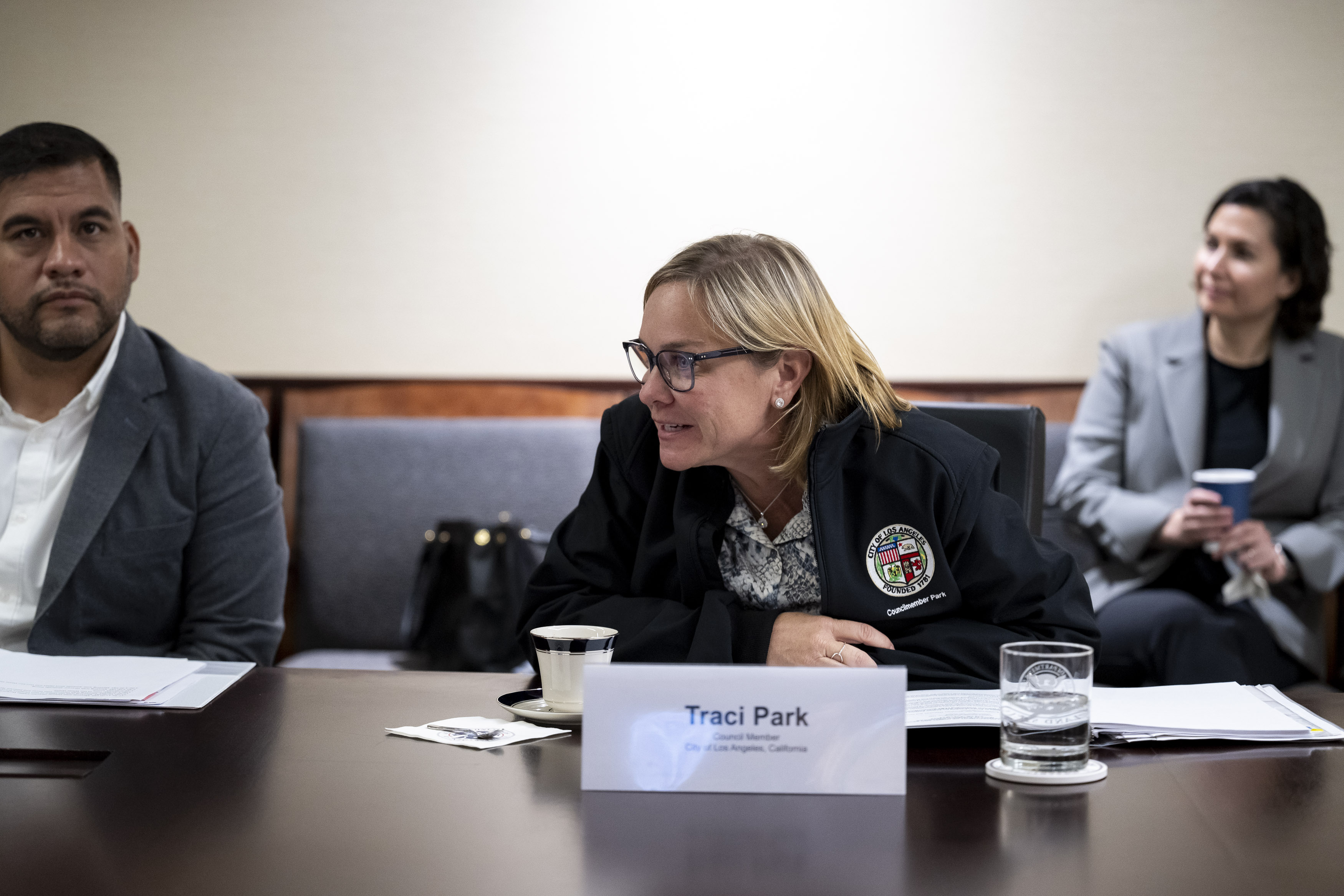
Park speaking at the U.S. Customs and Border Protection Headquarters in October 2023.

During her swearing-in ceremony, protesters were removed after trying to interrupt Park's speech. She voted in favor of the 41.18 ordinance, a measure which aimed to curtail homeless encampments by banning sitting, sleeping and storing property within 500 feet of schools, day-care centers, parks, and recreation centers, in a contrast to her predecessor's refusal to support the ordinance. Park explained that the city would not enforce the measure until all homeless individuals impacted by the ordinance had "the opportunity to come inside" and that the city had "the beds" for all those impacted. In 2024, Park expressed opposition to Measure HLA, which would create hundreds of miles of bus lanes and bike lanes, citing concerns surrounding funding, implementation and potential traffic changes.

Park worked with Mayor Karen Bass to clear homeless encampments. She opposed California state legislation that restricted the ability of localities to ban new housing. In 2023, she assured residents who were protesting plans to build apartment buildings on the Westside, that "there's going to be a lot of meetings" about the plans. That same year, she expressed opposition to tearing down the Marina Freeway and replacing it with housing. After the city cleared a homeless encampment at the Bundy Triangle in Sawtelle and designated it a 41.18 enforcement zone in November 2024, Park's office launched a weekly Friday night market at the site with local vendors and family programming from the Cayton Children's Museum in Santa Monica.

In July 2023, Park joined wildlife officials and the Marine Mammal Care Center at Charlie Beach in Marina del Rey to launch a temporary marine mammal resting zone for sea lions sickened by a toxic algae bloom off the Southern California coast. In May 2024, Park launched the Coastal Care+ program in Venice Beach, a city sanitation operation that removed health hazards and solid waste from homeless encampments along the coastline. As of February 2025, Park serves as Vice Chair of the Santa Monica Bay Restoration Commission's Governing Board.

Her district was ravaged by the 2025 Palisades Fire. According to the Los Angeles Times, Park had become the "face of the recovery" from the Palisades Fire due to her frequent public events and support for fire victims. After the fires, she called for modernization of L.A. fire hydrants. On an interview on ABC News, Park explained that Los Angeles had "chronically underfunded" the Los Angeles Fire Department for "decades," with LA lacking 62 fire stations to meet its needs as of 2025. After the 2025 Palisades Fire displaced the Pacific Palisades Farmers Market, Park welcomed vendors and shoppers to a temporary relocation alongside the Brentwood Farmers Market on San Vicente Boulevard.

In May 2025, Park was one of three council members to vote against the city's $13.9 billion fiscal year 2025–26 budget, calling it "a bottomless pit and taxpayer boondoggle that doubles down on failure."

In 2026, Park advocated for Venice Beach's inclusion in the 2028 Summer Olympics (LA28) after the neighborhood was initially left out of the LA28 venue plan. Following her pushback, Venice was designated to host the triathlon, marathon start and road cycling, with Venice Boulevard serving as the triathlon's transition area and finish line. In February 2026, Park introduced a motion to create a specialized repair team to address widespread streetlight outages across Westside neighborhoods, which she and fellow council member Katy Yaroslavsky attributed to organized copper wire theft.

In 2026, Park worked with Bass to resolve permitting and logistical obstacles that had briefly displaced filming of a Fox Broadcasting Company reboot of the television show Baywatch from Venice Beach. After the production was pushed to other locations within days of beginning its shoot at the Venice Lifeguard Station, Park met with Fox executives to address restrictions on parking, staging and production hours, and stated that the show "was never leaving Venice or Los Angeles." The reboot was seen by officials as a significant effort to retain entertainment industry production in Los Angeles amid a broader decline in local filming.

=== Controversy ===
In July 2024, Park was named as a key figure in a lawsuit against the city of Los Angeles for using "backdoor strategies to thwart and obstruct" the Venice Dell Community project, an affordable housing project in Venice, CA intended to house low income artists, workers, and formerly houseless individuals. According to the lawsuit, Park, along with Hydee Feldstein Soto, allegedly cut off regular meetings with developers, required communication to go through the city attorney's office and failed to sign approvals for the project to break ground. The project, which was originally launched in 2016, had already been awarded $45 million dollars from state and county governments, was unanimously approved twice, in 2021 and 2022, by the Los Angeles City Council and unanimously approved in 2024 by the California Coastal Commission. As a result of the obstruction from both Traci Park and the city, in October 2024, state officials sent a letter to the city asking them to explain their actions “to significantly delay and effectively deny” the Venice Dell Community Project. In the letter, state officials threatened to enact the "builder's remedy," which would essentially strip the city of its ability to say no to new housing developments.

The city of Los Angeles has allocated more than $2 million in legal fees to Nossaman LLP and opened itself to more than $10 million in damages by delaying this project.

On May 26, 2026, Los Angeles County Superior Court Judge Curtis Kin declared that the Board of Transportation Commissioners had exceeded their authority when denying "the use of Lot 731 for the Venice Dell affordable housing project." Traci Park used the Board of Transportation Commissioners December 2024 ruling to erroneously declare the Venice Dell project "dead." Kin ordered the Board to vacate their previous ruling.

== Electoral history ==
2022 Los Angeles City Council District 11 election
Primary election
| Candidate | Votes | % |
|---|---|---|
| Erin Darling | 22,939 | 34.67 |
| Traci Park | 19,168 | 28.97 |
| Greg Good | 6,565 | 9.92 |
| Allison Holdorff Polhill | 5,805 | 8.77 |
| Michael Newhouse | 4,702 | 7.11 |
| Jim Murez | 3,286 | 4.97 |
| Matthew Smith | 2,590 | 3.91 |
| Midsanon "Soni" Lloyd | 1,116 | 1.69 |
| Total votes | 66,171 | 100.00 |
General election
| Traci Park | 50,758 | 52.06 |
| Erin Darling | 46,732 | 47.94 |
| Total votes | 97,490 | 100.00 |
