= Robert S. MacAlister =

American politician

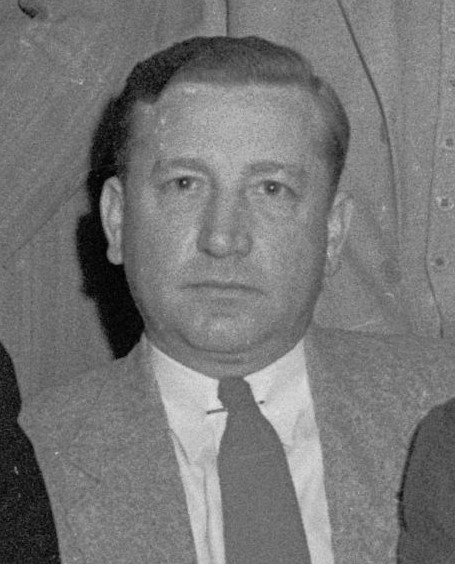
- MacAlister in 1935

Member of the Los Angeles City Council for the 11th district
- In office June 11, 1934 – June 30, 1939
- Preceded by: Charles Winchester Breedlove
- Succeeded by: Harold Harby

Personal details
- Born: May 11, 1897; Camden, New Jersey
- Died: January 15, 1957 (aged 59); Sawtelle, Los Angeles

Robert Stuart MacAlister (May 11, 1897 – January 15, 1957) was an oil-well-supplies salesman and a member of the Los Angeles, California, City Council between 1934 and 1939.

== Biography ==
MacAlister was born on May 11, 1897, in Camden, New Jersey, the son of Alexander and Sarah R. MacAlister. He went to Camden High School and to Swarthmore Preparatory School in Swarthmore, Pennsylvania, and to Lafayette College in Easton, Pennsylvania. In 1917 he left school and enlisted in the Army, seeing service with the 29th Division of the American Expeditionary Force during World War I. He was demobilized and worked his way westward across the country, arriving in Los Angeles in 1920. His first position there was as billing clerk, bookkeeper and collector for eighteen months with the Los Angeles Gas and Electric Corporation, then for six years as sales manager for the Hercules Trailer Manufacturing Company. He was with the Fager Hydraulic Hoist and Body Company until 1933. Afterward, until his seating on the City Council in 1936, he was with the Petroleum Equipment Company and with the insurance firm of Osterloh and Durham. After his City Council service ended in 1939, he was in sales for the Premier Metal Products Company, 929 East Slauson Avenue.

MacAlister was married to Iris G. Doman on July 26, 1922. They had two sons, Robert Jr. and Glen Allan. He moved to California in June 1930. They later divorced.

In October 1940, MacAlister was chairman of the California State Democratic [Party] Federation.

On July 1, 1943, MacAlister was arrested and charged with drunk driving when he made a U-turn in front of a police car, and his then wife, Clara Blaz MacAlister, was charged with being drunk in an automobile. They were acquitted by a jury of the charges of intoxication, and the jury was hung on the charge against MacAlister of drunk driving.

A Democrat and an Episcopalian, MacAlister was a member of the Jonathan Club, the American Legion, the Veterans of Foreign Wars and the Arnama Club, a service club composed of ex-servicemen. For recreation, he played bridge.

MacAlister, who lived at 1115 S. Curson Avenue died of a seizure on January 15, 1957, while on a luncheon engagement with a family friend, Harriet Ravey, in her home at 1028 Meadowbrook Avenue. He had undergone an operation at the Sawtelle Veterans Hospital for removal of a blood clot in the brain. He was buried in Hollywood Memorial Park Cemetery.

== City Council ==
=== Appointment and elections ===
MacAlister was appointed by the City Council on May 8, 1934, to the 11th Councilmanic District seat to take the place of Charles W. Breedlove, who had died in office; he was to serve until the next election, in 1935. MacAlister immediately ran into trouble, though, when it was determined that he had recently moved from 1643 South Hayworth Avenue, within the 11th District, to 1601 Stearns Drive within the 3rd District.

Many of the disappointed candidates, of whom there were twenty-seven, were present in the chamber at the time and expressed their surprise. Many appeared to be grievously indignant, and rushed around protesting.

The council attempted to reconsider its appointment, and a court action was taken: On June 8, a Court of Appeals decision written by Justice Albert Lee Stephens held that MacAlister had been legally appointed and the council could not change its mind.

MacAlister won the race for a full two-year term in the 1935 election, besting the End Poverty in California candidate, Howard B. Rose. He was reelected in 1937, but he lost the 1939 vote to Harold Harby.

=== Highlights ===
1936 MacAlister was forced to withdraw a resolution asking the City Council to adopt a "sympathetic attitude toward the problems of games of skill and science" in the Venice area, which he represented, because of an "unsympathetic attitude" by his fellow council members. Instead, he presented to the Police Commission a petition to that effect bearing the names of 2,000 people.

1939 He and Councilman James M. Hyde issued a joint statement "flatly denying the imputation in certain newspapers that 45 workmen employed in the street traffic engineering bureau" were relatives of council members.

1939 He and other council members were on a "purge list" of Mayor Fletcher Bowron, who urged their defeat in the 1939 election.

Preceded by Charles W. Breedlove	Los Angeles City Council; 11th District; 1934–39	Succeeded by Harold Harby
