= Arvid Rundberg =

Arvid Rundberg was a Swedish author born 1932. He worked as a journalist and travelled Latin America before deciding to embark on his book series on workers in different countries.

== Books ==
Rundberg is most famous for his biographical series on workers in different countries, comprising four books. He would sit down with a worker and interview him about his life, and then write it in the first person.

These series include "En svensk arbetares memoarer" (1976), (Memoirs of a Swedish worker) where Rundberg interviews a Swedish factory worker, Gustav Eriksson, on his life and his time in the Spanish Civil War.

In "En rysk arbetares memoarer" (1975), (Memoirs of a Russian worker), Rundberg interviews Soviet worker Vladimir Arbatskij on his life and his experience of the Russian Revolution.

In "En tysk arbetares memoarer" (1978) (Memoirs of a German worker) Rundberg interviews German lumberman Fritz Bradtke about his experience of the Hitler takeover and his time as a trade unionist.

In "En engelsk arbetares memoarer" (Memoirs of an English worker) Rundberg interviews Max Beyer about his upbringing in the slums of London and his evolution as a Communist.

All of the above workers were socialist just like Rundberg himself.

== Bibliography ==
- Barnatro: en polisroman (2001)
- Mördande arv: en kriminalberättelse (1998)
- Tango: en historisk roman (1993)
- Charlie Bensons krig (1989)
- Mitt Berlin (1987)
- Frisco-Per (1985)
- Resan till Jorden (1984)
- Resa till New Orleans: en roman (1980)
- En tysk arbetares memoarer (1978)
- En engelsk arbetares memoarer (1977)
- En rysk arbetares memoarer (1974)
- En svensk arbetares memoarer: Gustav Ericson (1973)
- Barnsonaten (1973)
- Personakt A 4420 (1972)
- Nittonhundrasextionio (1969)
- Byggnadsarbetare tillsammans med fotograf Jean Hermansson (1969)
- Den stora kappseglingen tillsammans med fotograf Reijo Rüster (1968)
- Kvinnorna i Valerosa (1968)
- Hajgraven (1967)
- Luna: roman om havet och människan (1966)
- Mannen i mitten: porträtt av en hemlig agent (1965)
- 100 år i luften (1965)
- Mannen från Amerika (1964)
- Mr Bilks död (1963)
- Upp periskop! En bok om det svenska ubåtsvapnet (1963)
- De sista (1962)
