= Karl L. Rundberg =

American politician (1899–1969)

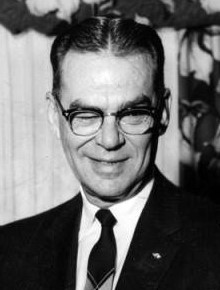

Member of the Los Angeles City Council from the 11th district
- In office July 1, 1957 – June 30, 1965
- Preceded by: Harold Harby
- Succeeded by: Marvin Braude

Personal details
- Born: January 30, 1899 Kansas City, Missouri, U.S.
- Died: April 2, 1969 (aged 70)

Karl L. Rundberg (30 January 1899 – 2 April 1969) was an American businessman and politician. He was notable as a Los Angeles City Council member between 1957 and 1965. He was convicted of accepting a bribe in 1967 when a member of the city's Harbor Commission and was placed on probation. The conviction was reversed by a higher court.

== Early life and education ==
Rundberg was born in Kansas City, Missouri, on January 30, 1899. He attended public schools there. Later he took classes in commercial and industrial illumination at Washington University in St. Louis.

== Career before politics ==
He became a businessman in that city specializing in commercial and industrial lighting and was general manager of Modern Lighting Company there.

He moved to Pacific Palisades to retire. In 1953 he was named assistant director of the city's civil defense organization. He was a member of the American Legion, Westwood Shrine Club, and a director of Richland Avenue Youth House. He was president of the Lions Club in Jefferson City, Missouri.

== City Council ==
=== Elections ===
Rundberg was elected to a four-year term to represent Los Angeles City Council District 11 in 1957, ousting fellow conservative Harold Harby, the incumbent, by 17,524 votes to 10,193. He was easily reelected in the primary election of 1961, but in 1965 he was beaten in the general election by Marvin Braude.

=== Highlights ===
==== Beach noise ====
Rundberg, a conservative Republican, was known for his antipathy toward beatniks, Bohemians and others with non-conformist lifestyles living in the Venice beach area of his district. In a "resounding" City Council session in May 1957, he called them "scum" and "animals" just before the council passed an ordinance, 11–2, to restrict the noise from their bongo and Conga drums by forbidding the playing of any musical instruments on beaches or parks within 750 feet of a residence between 10 p.m. and 7 a.m. Only former policeman Tom Bradley and musician Ernani Bernardi were opposed.

A Police Department spokesman said that officers would take a noise-maker into custody, but only if a citizen made the arrest for disturbing the peace because officially an officer's peace cannot be disturbed. "It's sickening to me," replied Rundberg, "when I hear that a policeman has to stand by . . . because of some legal hair-splitting." He added: "Our people are afraid to come out after dark because of these animals—and that's what they are."

==== Mayor Yorty ====
Rundberg was a foe of Mayor Sam Yorty, on one occasion in 1963 accusing the mayor's office of investigating Rundberg's background with the purpose of recalling him from office. "The whole tribe is not fit to be in public office," Rundberg said of the mayor's staff.

==== Mountains ====
The "blunt-speaking" councilman tangled with actors Steve McQueen and James Garner on successive days in July 1964 as the City Council debated a controversial master plan for the Santa Monica Mountains, with McQueen angrily telling Rundberg "Don't close the door in my face!" at one council meeting, and Garner and Rundberg, with their fists clenched, trading "more harsh words at the top of their voices, their faces less than a foot apart," at the next day's meeting, until they were separated by a police officer.

== Conviction ==
After his City Council term ended, Rundberg was appointed by Mayor Sam Yorty to the city Harbor Commission. In August 1968 Rundberg and fellow commissioner Robert (Nick) Starr were convicted of receiving bribes in return for their help in getting a $12 million city contract for developer Keith Smith at the harbor. Superior Judge William B. Keene sentenced Starr to a year in jail but placed Rundberg on probation because of the latter's ill health.

The conviction was reversed by the State Court of Appeal, which held the jury had not been properly instructed on whether the crime of bribery had been committed.

== Later years ==
After having a history of heart problems, he died on April 2, 1969, leaving his wife, Margaret; a son, Karl Jr., and a daughter, Marie Pohle. He was 70 years old.

Preceded by Harold Harby	Los Angeles City Council; 11th District; 1957–65	Succeeded by Marvin Braude
