= Los Angeles's 11th City Council district =

American legislative district

Councilmember
| Traci Park; D–Venice |
since December 12, 2020
- Demographics: 60.1% White; 5.2% Black; 18.7% Hispanic; 11.6% Asian; 0.4% Other
- Population (2020): 284,600
- Registered voters (2017): 171,819
- Website: cd11.lacity.gov

Los Angeles's 11th City Council district is one of the fifteen districts in the Los Angeles City Council. It is currently represented by Democrat Traci Park since 2022, who succeeded Mike Bonin after his retirement.

The district was created in 1925 after a new city charter was passed, which replaced the former "at large" voting system for a nine-member council with a district system with a 15-member council. The 11th District originally encompassed an area south of Downtown before being moved to the Venice area in 1928, where it has stayed since. It is the largest district in the Los Angeles City Council by square miles.

== Geography ==
The 11th District is bounded by Mulholland Drive on the north, the Pacific Ocean on the west, Imperial Highway on the south and roughly the 405 freeway on the east. The district covers all or a portion of the following: Brentwood, Del Rey, Mar Vista, Marina del Rey, Pacific Palisades, Palms, Playa del Rey, Playa Vista, Sawtelle, Venice, West Los Angeles, Westchester and the Los Angeles International Airport.

The district overlaps California's 36th congressional district and California's 32nd congressional district as well as California's 24th and 35th State Senate districts and California's 42nd and 62nd State Assembly districts.

=== Historical boundaries ===
In 1925, when it was first mapped, it covered an area just south of Downtown, but three years later it was transferred to the Westside of the city. It originally had the district headquarters at 431 West Seventh Street, the present site of the Los Angeles Athletic Club. In 1928, the district was moved from the downtown section of the city and transplanted to the coast region. By 1933, it was scattered area due to its inclosure of county territory. Its eastern boundary is La Brea Avenue, its north boundary is Pico Boulevard, its southern boundary the city limits and its western boundary the ocean. In 1957, it had parts of West Los Angeles, Westwood, Pacific Palisades, Brentwood, Mar Vista and Palms. In 1960, Venice was shifted into the district from the 6th District.

In 1971, it had Pacific Palisades, Brentwood, and West Los Angeles with sections of Tarzana, Encino, Rancho Park, Westdale, Mar Vista and Venice. By 1997, it had 73 square miles, bisected by the Santa Monica Mountains, include ritzy hillside enclaves stretching from Woodland Hills to Encino, Pacific Palisades to Brentwood. Poorer parts of Van Nuys and the West Los Angeles flatlands are included as well.

== List of members representing the district ==
| Councilmember | Party | Dates | Electoral history |
|---|---|---|---|
District established July 1, 1925
| Peirson M. Hall (Westlake) | Democratic | July 1, 1925 – June 30, 1929 | Elected in 1925. Re-elected in 1927. Retired. |
| J. C. Barthel (Castle Heights) | Republican | July 1, 1929 – June 30, 1931 | Elected in 1929. Lost re-election. |
| Clarence E. Coe (Palms) | Republican | July 1, 1931 – June 30, 1933 | Elected in 1931. Lost re-election. |
| Charles W. Breedlove (West Adams) | Democratic | July 1, 1933 – April 26, 1934 | Elected in 1933. Died. |
| Vacant | | April 26, 1934 – June 11, 1934 | |
| Robert S. MacAlister (Faircrest Heights) | Democratic | June 11, 1934 – June 30, 1939 | Appointed to finish Breedlove's term. Elected in 1935. Re-elected in 1937. Lost re-election. |
| Harold Harby (Reynier Village) | Democratic | July 1, 1939 – January 12, 1942 | Elected in 1939. Re-elected in 1941. Removed from office. |
| Vacant | | January 12, 1942 – May 18, 1942 | |
| Dave Stannard (West Adams) | Democratic | May 18, 1942 – June 30, 1943 | Appointed to finish Harby's term. Lost election. |
| Harold Harby (Reynier Village) | Democratic | July 1, 1943 – June 30, 1957 | Elected in 1943. Re-elected in 1945. Re-elected in 1947. Re-elected in 1949. Re-elected in 1951. Re-elected in 1953. Re-elected in 1955. Lost re-election. |
| Karl L. Rundberg (Pacific Palisades) | Republican | July 1, 1957 – June 30, 1965 | Elected in 1957. Re-elected in 1961. Lost re-election. |
| Marvin Braude (Brentwood) | Democratic | July 1, 1965 – June 30, 1997 | Elected in 1961. Re-elected in 1965. Re-elected in 1969. Re-elected in 1973. Re-elected in 1977. Re-elected in 1981. Re-elected in 1985. Re-elected in 1989. Re-elected in 1993. Retired due to term limits. |
| Cindy Miscikowski (Brentwood) | Democratic | July 1, 1997 – June 30, 2005 | Elected in 1997. Re-elected in 2001. Retired due to term limits. |
| Bill Rosendahl (Mar Vista) | Democratic | July 1, 2005 – June 30, 2013 | Elected in 2005. Re-elected in 2009. Retired. |
| Mike Bonin (Venice) | Democratic | July 1, 2013 – December 12, 2022 | Elected in 2013. Re-elected in 2017. Retired. |
| Traci Park (Venice) | Democratic | December 12, 2022 – present | Elected in 2022. Re-elected in 2026. |
