= Cindy Miscikowski =

American politician

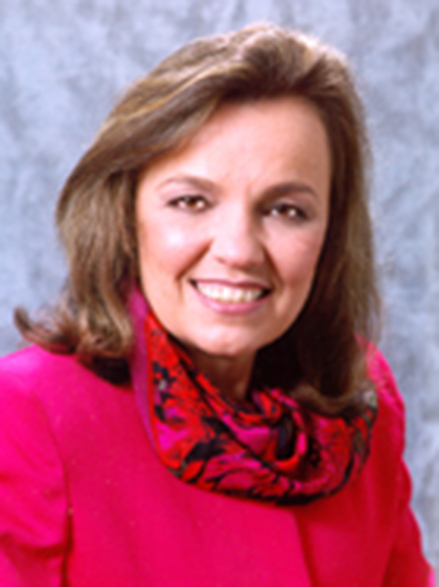
- Official portrait, 2000

Member of the Los Angeles City Council for the 11th district
- In office July 1, 1997 – June 30, 2005
- Preceded by: Marvin Braude
- Succeeded by: Bill Rosendahl

President pro Tempore of the Los Angeles City Council
- In office July 1, 2003 – June 30, 2005
- Preceded by: Mark Ridley-Thomas
- Succeeded by: Wendy Greuel

Assistant President pro Tempore of the Los Angeles City Council
- In office July 1, 2001 – June 30, 2003
- Preceded by: Rudy Svorinich
- Succeeded by: Eric Garcetti

Personal details
- Born: 1948 (age 77–78)
- Party: Democratic

Cynthia Miscikowski (born 1948) is an American politician who represented the 11th District on the Los Angeles City Council for two full terms from 1997 through 2005. Previously, she was an aide to Councilman Marvin Braude and the Executive Director of the Skirball Cultural Center in its beginning stages. She served as the President of the Board of Harbor Commissioners under Mayor Antonio Villaraigosa, overseeing the Port of Los Angeles.

She joined forces with Muslim organizations to try to restrict the number of strip clubs and businesses with liquor licenses in her district, which contains the largest Muslim population of any City Council district in Los Angeles. Miscikowski is Vice Chairman of the LAPD Foundation and was awarded the 2008 Public Service Award by the UCLA Alumni Association.

Preceded by Marvin Braude	Los Angeles City Councilwoman; 11th district 1997–2005	Succeeded by Bill Rosendahl
Preceded by Mark Ridley-Thomas	President Pro Tempore of the Los Angeles City Council; 2003–2005	Succeeded by Wendy Greuel
Preceded by Rudy Svorinich	Assistant President Pro Tempore of the Los Angeles City Council; 2001– 2003	Succeeded by Eric Garcetti
