= 1909 Los Angeles mayoral election =

- November 9, 1909 and December 7, 1909
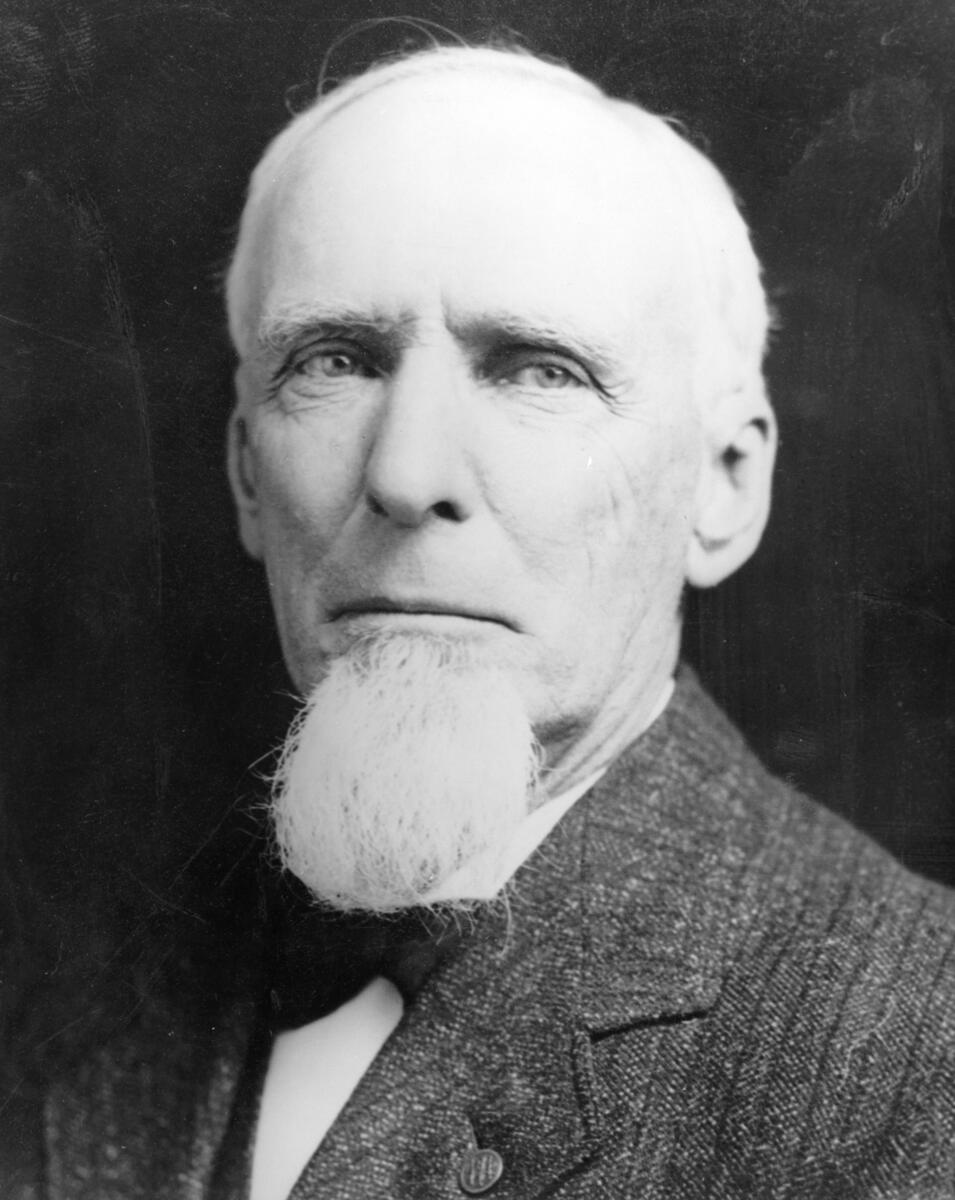

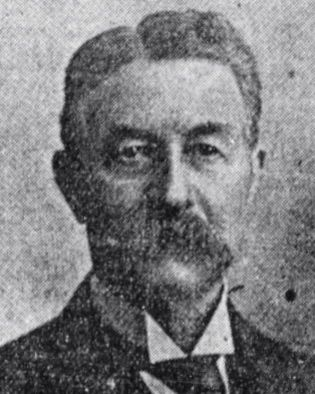

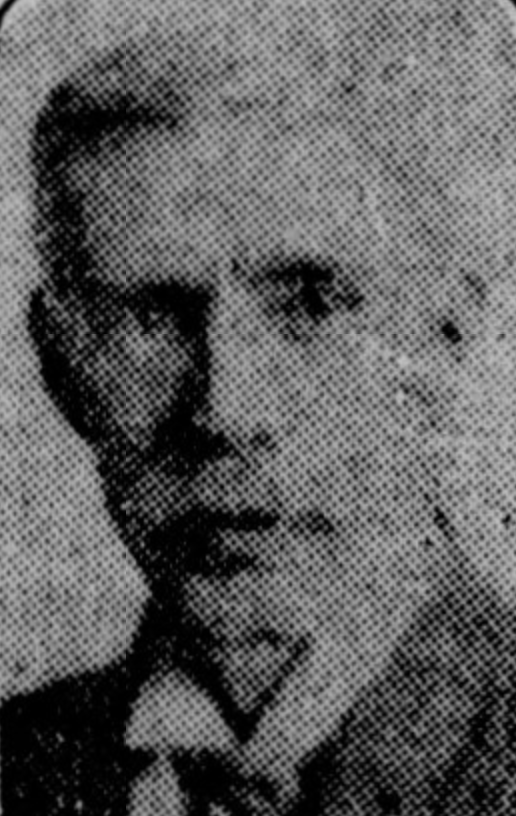

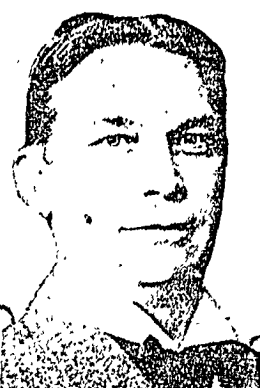
Candidate	George Alexander	George A. Smith
First round	12,143; 39.59%	7,184; 23.42%
Runoff	20,291; 54.47%	16,964; 45.54%
Candidate	William C. Mushet	Oscar E. Farish
First round	7,165; 23.36%	3,254; 10.61%
Runoff	Eliminated	Eliminated
Mayor before election
George Alexander
Elected Mayor
George Alexander

The 1909 Los Angeles mayoral election took place on November 9, 1909, with a run-off election on December 7, 1909. Incumbent George Alexander was re-elected over George A. Smith in the runoff election.

Municipal elections in California, including for mayor of Los Angeles, are officially nonpartisan; candidates' party affiliations do not appear on the ballot.

== Election ==
Incumbent George Alexander won the March 1909 Los Angeles mayoral election to finish Arthur C. Harper's term, and was now seeking a full term. He was challenged by George A. Smith, a fellow Republican and former councilman, William C. Mushet, an Independent who was the Los Angeles city auditor, and Oscar Eugene Farish, a Democrat and former councilman.

In the primary, Smith and Mushet were close in totals to be included on the ballot for the runoff election, and some Mushet supporters floated the idea of Smith withdrawing to allow Mushet on the ballot. In the results, Smith had a lead by a small margin, placing him on the ballot. After the results of the primary were released, Mushet sued for a recount, alleging misconduct in every precinct. A month later, he stated that he had "failed to gain a place on the ballot partly because of a defect in the primary election law."

In the general election, Alexander defeated Smith with a majority vote.

== Results ==
=== Primary election ===
Los Angeles mayoral primary election, November 9, 1909
Candidate	Votes	%
George Alexander (incumbent)	12,143	39.59
George A. Smith	7,184	23.42
William C. Mushet	7,165	23.36
Oscar Eugene Farish	3,254	10.61
W. Scott Lewis	720	2.35
James C. Hurley	116	0.38
J. W. Jones	88	0.29
Total votes	30,670	100.00

=== General election ===
Los Angeles mayoral general election, December 7, 1909
Candidate	Votes	%
George Alexander (incumbent)	20,291	54.47
George A. Smith	16,964	45.54
Total votes	37,255	100.00
