= William C. Mushet =

American politician (1860–1927)

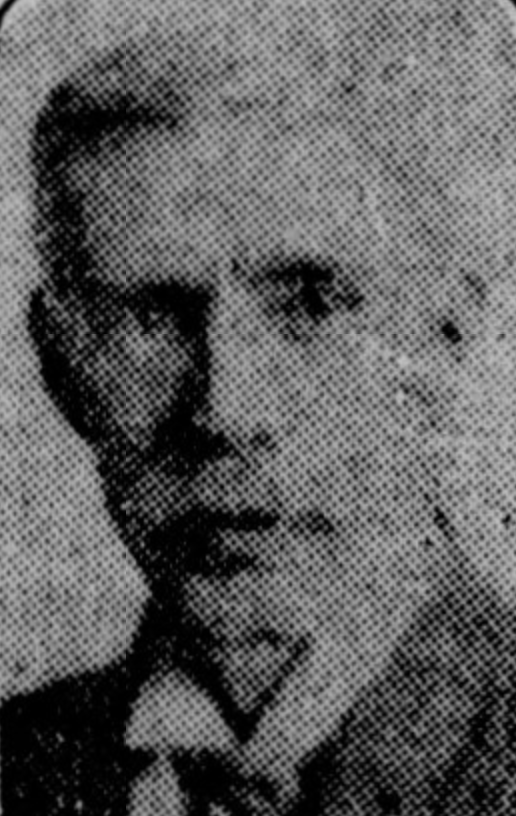
- Mushet in 1911

Member of the Los Angeles City Council for the at-large district
- In office July 5, 1921 – June 30, 1925
- Succeeded by: Constituency eliminated

Los Angeles City Auditor
- In office December 13, 1906 – December 10, 1909
- Preceded by: Lewis H. Schwaebe
- Succeeded by: John S. Myers

Personal details
- Born: December 22, 1860 Manchester, England, UK
- Died: September 18, 1927 (aged 66) Los Angeles, California
- Party: Republican
- Spouse: Hattie Angelina Lobdell
- Children: 6

William Cresswell Mushet (December 22, 1860 – September 18, 1927) was an American politician who was a member of the Los Angeles City Council 1921 to 1925 and was the Los Angeles City Auditor from 1906 to 1909. He was twice an unsuccessful candidate for the Mayor of Los Angeles in 1909 and 1911.

== Biography ==
Mushet was born on December 22, 1860, in Manchester, England and immigrated to San Francisco, California in 1886. He had 6 children with his wife, Hattie Angelina Lobdell.

In 1906, he was elected as the Los Angeles City Auditor. As the City Auditor, he helped with the financially discredited and bankrupt city government and made it stable, as well as creating a reserve fund for the city.

Mushet unsuccessfully ran in the November 1909 Los Angeles mayoral election against fellow Republican and incumbent George Alexander, placing third against Republican challenger George A. Smith. Mushet ran again in the 1911 Los Angeles mayoral election against incumbent Alexander and Socialist challenger Job Harriman, where he did not make the runoff as well although he was endorsed by the Democratic Central City Committee.

In 1921, he won a seat on the Los Angeles City Council for what was the at-large district. As a council-member, he was the Chairman of the Finance Committee in which he helped with the city finances as well as with the repeal of the occupational tax.

Mushet died on September 18, 1927, at his home in Los Angeles.
