= Johannsen =

Johannsen is a surname. Notable people with the surname include:

- Anton Johannsen (1872–1929), German-American labor militant
- Franz Johannsen (1921–2006), German sprint canoeist
- Gunnar Johannsen (born 1940), German cyberneticist, and Professor of Systems Engineering and Human-Machine Systems
- Hans Johannsen (1913–1961), German chief engineer on a U-boat in World War II
- Helmuth Johannsen (1920–1998), German football coach
- Jake Johannsen (born 1960), American comedian
- Kristoffer Johannsen (born 1977), Danish former professional football player
- Kurt Johannsen (bush mechanic) (1915–2002), Australian mechanic
- Kyle Johannsen, Canadian philosopher
- Nicholas Johannsen, German-American amateur economist
- Oskar Augustus Johannsen (1870–1961), American entomologist, specialist of Diptera
- Wilhelm Johannsen (1857–1927), Danish botanist, plant physiologist and geneticist

== See also ==
- Herman Smith-Johannsen (1875–1987), Norwegian-Canadian supercentenarian, cross-country skiing advocate
