= 1911 Los Angeles mayoral election =

- October 31, 1911 and December 5, 1911
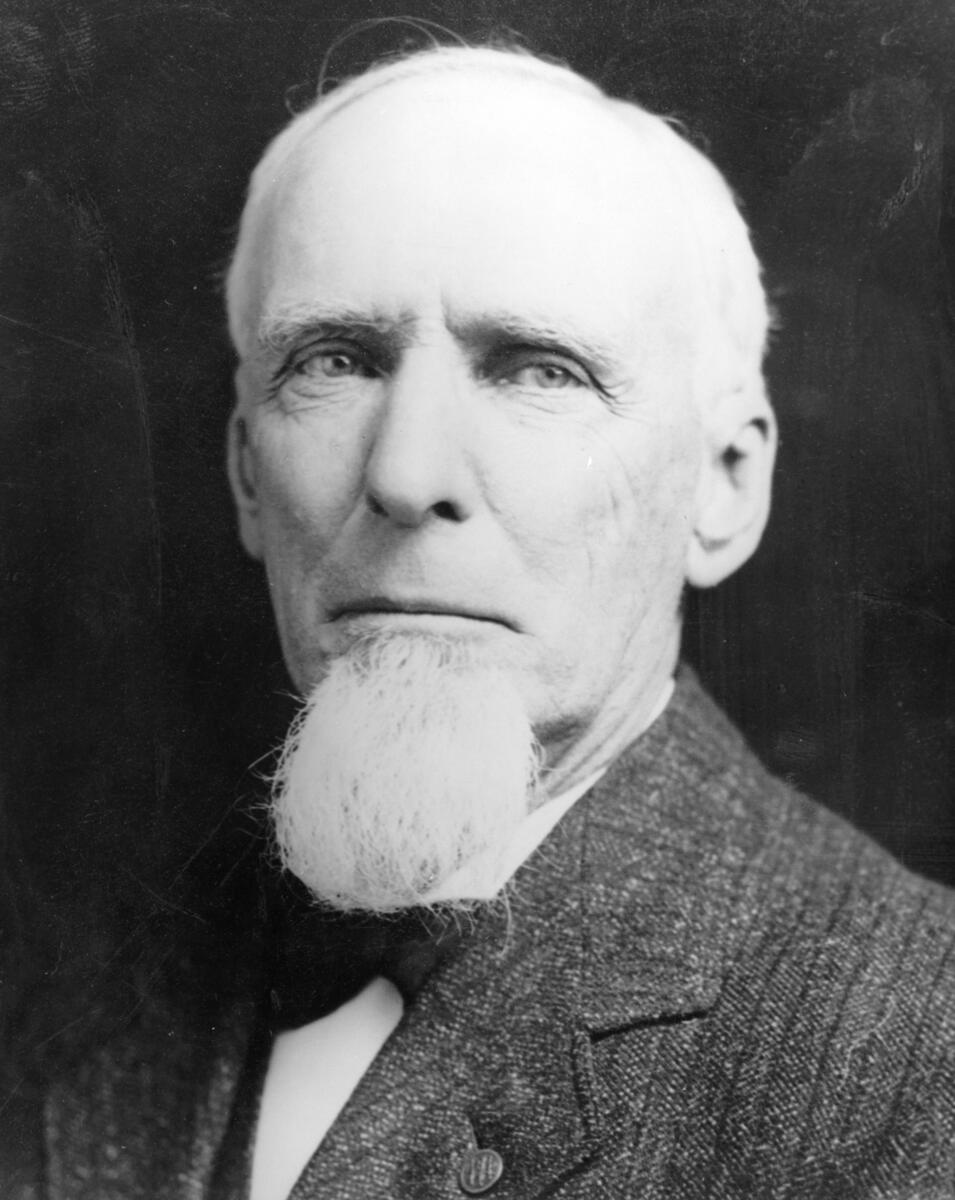

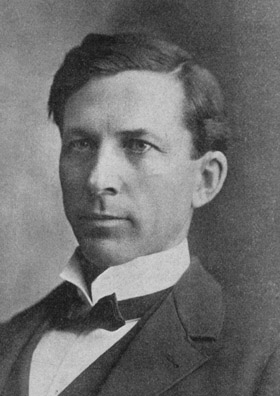

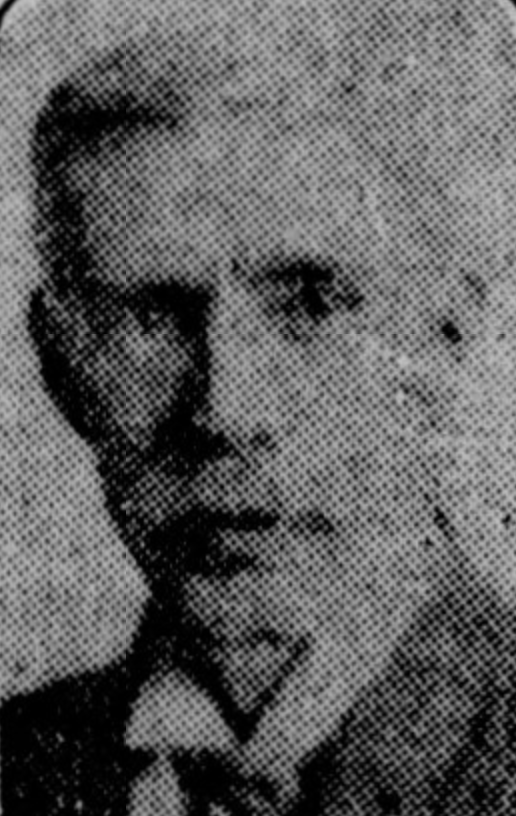
Candidate	George Alexander	Job Harriman	William C. Mushet
First round	16,790; 36.87%	20,183; 44.32%	8,191; 17.99%
Runoff	85,739; 62.34%	51,796; 37.66%	Eliminated
Mayor before election
George Alexander
Elected Mayor
George Alexander

The 1911 Los Angeles mayoral election took place on October 31, 1911, with a run-off election on December 5, 1911. Incumbent George Alexander was re-elected for a second full term against Job Harriman.

Municipal elections in California, including Mayor of Los Angeles, are officially nonpartisan; candidates' party affiliations do not appear on the ballot.

== Election ==
Incumbent George Alexander had been elected in March 1909 and was now seeking a second term. He was challenged by Job Harriman, an ordained minister and Socialist, William C. Mushet, who ran in the previous election, Miles S. Gregory, a fellow Republican and Councilmember, and James O. Becker, a Socialist Labor candidate.

In the primary, Harriman had an 8-point lead above Alexander, and Harriman stated that he believed that he had "been without doubt nominated for mayor of [Los Angeles]." However, in the general election, Alexander won due to Harriman's association with James and John McNamara, who he was one of the lawyers for during their trial for the Los Angeles Times bombing.

== Results ==
=== Primary election ===
Los Angeles mayoral primary election, October 31, 1911
Candidate	Votes	%
Job Harriman	20,183	44.32%
George Alexander (incumbent)	16,790	36.87%
William C. Mushet	8,191	17.99%
Miles S. Gregory	327	0.72%
James O. Becker	52	0.11%
Total votes	45,543	100.00

=== General election ===
Los Angeles mayoral general election, December 5, 1911
Candidate	Votes	%
George Alexander (incumbent)	85,739	62.34%
Job Harriman	51,796	37.66%
Total votes	137,535	100.00
