= Los Angeles Times bombing =

1910 bombing by trade union activists

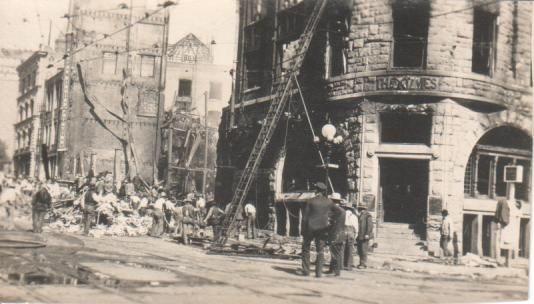
- Rubble of the Los Angeles Times Building in 1910
- Location: 34.05284°N 118.24500°W; Los Angeles, California, U.S.
- Date: October 1, 1910; 116 years ago 1:07 a.m.
- Target: Los Angeles Times Building
- Attack type: Time bombing, arson
- Weapon: Dynamite
- Deaths: 21
- Injuries: 100+
- Perpetrators: John J. McNamara; James B. McNamara; Ortie McManigal; Matthew Schmidt; David Caplan

On October 1, 1910, union members belonging to the International Association of Bridge and Structural Iron Workers (IW) detonated explosives they placed in the Los Angeles Times Building in Los Angeles, California, starting a fire that killed 21 people and injured more than 100 others. It was termed the "crime of the century" by the Los Angeles Times newspaper, which occupied the building.

Brothers John J. ("J.J.") and James Barnabas ("J.B.") McNamara were arrested in April 1911 on suspicion of perpetrating the bombing. At the time of their trial, the pair became a cause célèbre for the American labor movement. J.B. eventually admitted to setting the explosive, and was convicted and sentenced to life imprisonment. J.J. was sentenced to fifteen years in prison for bombing a local iron manufacturing plant, and later returned to the IW as an organizer.

The Times bombing remains both one of the deadliest criminal acts in U.S. history and the deadliest crime to go to trial in California.

== Background ==
The International Association of Bridge and Structural Iron Workers (IW) was formed in 1896. As the work was seasonal and most iron workers were unskilled, the union remained weak and much of the industry remained unorganized until 1902. That year, the IW won a strike against the American Bridge Company, a subsidiary of the newly formed U.S. Steel corporation. American Bridge was the dominant company in the iron industry, and within a year the IW had not only organized almost every U.S. iron manufacturer, but had also won signed contracts including union shop clauses. The McNamara brothers were Irish American unionists. John (known as J.J.) and his younger brother James (known as J.B.) were both active in the IW.

=== Strike against American Bridge Co. ===
James (left) and John McNamara

In 1903, officials of U.S. Steel and the American Bridge founded the National Erectors' Association (NEA), a coalition of steel and iron industry employers. The primary goal of the NEA was to promote the open shop and assist employers in busting the unions in their industries. Employers used labor spies, agents provocateur, private detective agencies, and strike breakers to engage in a campaign against the unions. Local, state, and federal law enforcement agencies generally cooperated in this campaign, which often used violence against union members.

Hard pressed by the open shop campaign, the IW reacted by electing the militant Frank M. Ryan president and J.J. McNamara the secretary-treasurer in 1905. In 1906, the IW struck at American Bridge in an attempt to retain their contract. However, the open shop campaign was a significant success. By 1910, U.S. Steel had almost succeeded in driving all unions out of its plants. Unions in other iron manufacturing companies also vanished. Only the IW held on (though the strike at American Bridge continued).

=== Dynamite campaign ===
Union officials used violence to counter the setbacks they had suffered. Beginning in late 1906, national and local officials of the IW launched a dynamiting campaign. Between 1906 and 1911, the union blew up 110 iron works, though only a few thousand dollars in damages was done. The NEA was well aware who was responsible for the bombings, since Herbert S. Hockin, a member of the IW's executive board, was their paid spy. These hundreds of bombings were later described as perhaps the largest domestic terrorism campaign in U.S. history.

=== Los Angeles strike ===
Employers in Los Angeles had been successfully resisting unionization for nearly half a century. Harrison Gray Otis, publisher of the Los Angeles Times, was vehemently anti-union. Otis first joined and then seized control of the local Merchants Association in 1896, renaming it the Merchants and Manufacturers' Association (colloquially known as the M&M), and used it and his newspaper's large circulation to spearhead a twenty-year campaign to end the city's few remaining unions. Without unions to keep wages high, open shop employers in Los Angeles were able to undermine the wage standards set in heavily unionized San Francisco. Unions in San Francisco feared that employers in their city would also soon begin pressing for wage cuts and start an open shop drive of their own. The only solution they saw was to re-unionize Los Angeles.

The San Francisco unions relied heavily on the IW, one of the few strong unions remaining in Los Angeles. The unionization campaign began in the spring of 1910. On June 1, 1910, 1,500 union members struck iron manufacturers in the city to win a $0.50 an hour minimum wage ($17 an hour in 2025 dollars) and overtime pay. The M&M raised $350,000 ($12,093,750 in 2025 dollars) to break the strike. A superior court judge issued a series of injunctions which all but banned picketing. On July 15, the Los Angeles City Council unanimously enacted an ordinance banning picketing and "speaking in public streets in a loud or unusual tone", with a penalty of fifty days in jail, a $100 fine, or both. Most union members refused to obey the injunctions or ordinance, and 472 strikers were arrested. The strike, however, proved effective: by September, 13 new unions had formed, increasing union membership in the city by almost 60 percent.

== Leading up to the explosion ==
On June 3, 1910, two days after the start of the strike, Eugene Clancy, the top IW official on the West Coast, wrote to J.J.: "Now, Joe, what I want here is Hockin," referring to Herbert Hockin, the union official in charge of the dynamite bombings. However, Hockin had been caught taking money earmarked for bombing jobs, and McNamara no longer trusted him. He asked another dynamiter, Jack Barry of St. Louis, to go to California, but Barry turned down the job when he learned of the targets. McNamara finally sent his younger brother, J.B., to California on the bombing mission.

== Bombing ==
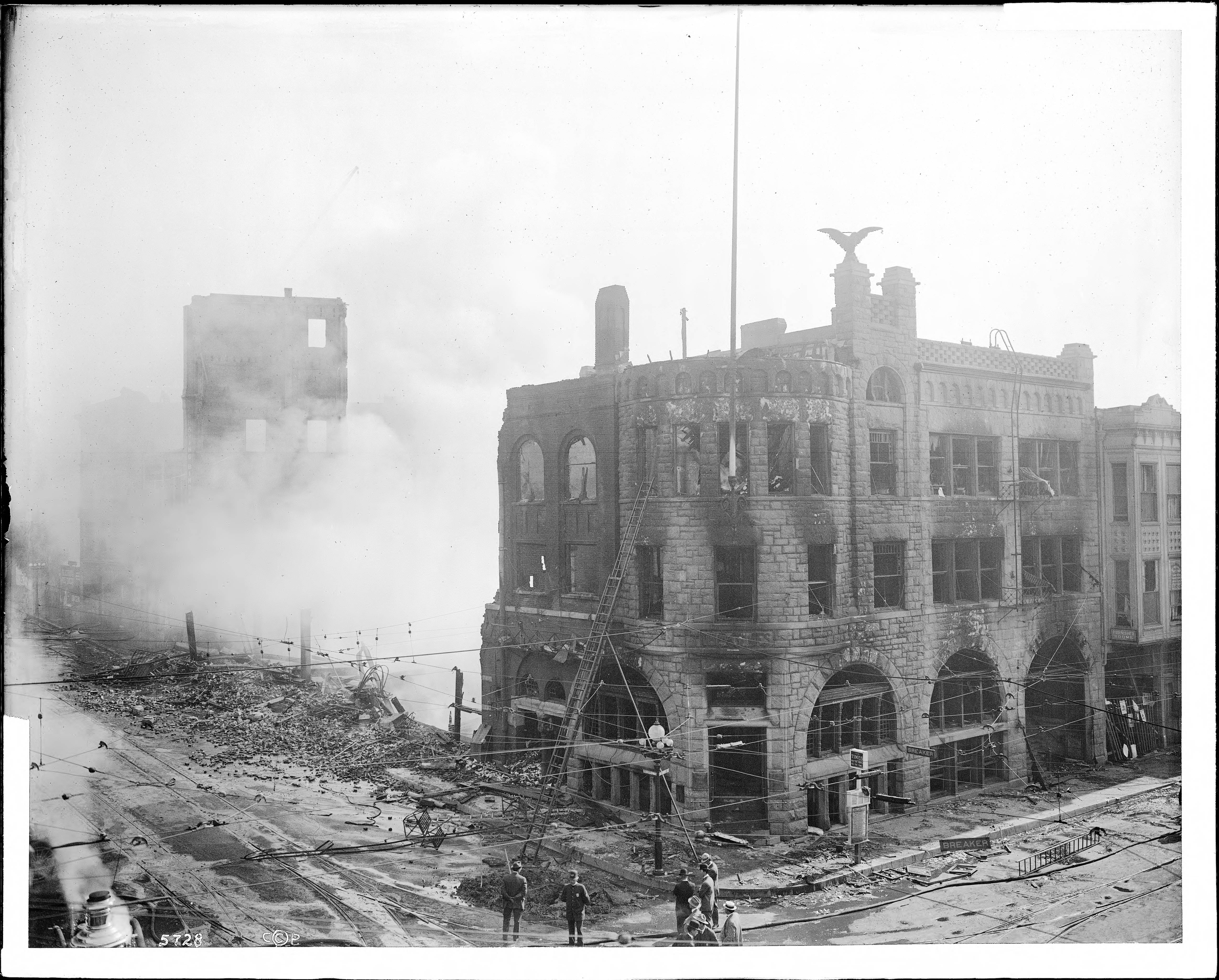
The Los Angeles Times Building after the bombing disaster on October 1, 1910. Nicknamed "the fortress", the 1886 brick and granite building was on Broadway and First Street, across the street from the present 1935 building.

On the evening of September 30, 1910, J.B. left a suitcase full of dynamite in the narrow alley between the Los Angeles Times Building and the Times Annex, known as "Ink Alley", which contained the paper's printing press. The suitcase was left near barrels of flammable printer's ink. The dynamite had a detonator connected to a mechanical windup clock, set to close an electric battery circuit at 1:00am, and set off the explosion. J.B. left similar bombs, also set to explode at 1:00am, next to the homes of both Times publisher Otis and Felix Zeehandelaar, secretary of the M&M. He then boarded a train to San Francisco, and was out of town when the bomb at the Times Building went off.

This was an escalation of the bombing campaign. Previously, only non-union workplaces had been targeted. Now the IW was expanding the targets to the homes of anti-union leaders, and a newspaper noted for its anti-union editorial policy.

At 1:07 a.m. on October 1, 1910, the bomb went off in the alley outside the three-story Times Building, located at First Street and Broadway. The sixteen sticks of dynamite in the suitcase bomb were not enough to level the whole structure, but the bomb ignited natural gas piped into the building. The Times was a morning paper, and so had employees working during the late-night early-morning hours. The bombers were unaware that a number of Times employees were working overnight to produce an extra edition the next afternoon which would carry the results of the Vanderbilt Cup auto race. The bomb collapsed the side of the building, and the ensuing fire destroyed both the Times Building and Ink Alley. Of the 115 people still in the building, 21 died (most of them in the fire). The Times called the bombing the "crime of the century", and Otis excoriated unions as "anarchic scum," "cowardly murderers," "leeches upon honest labor," and "midnight assassins."

An unresolved contradiction was J.B.'s knowledge of the gas pipes in the Times Building. After he confessed to the bombing, he insisted that he had not known of the gas pipes. However, Ortie McManigal testified that before their arrest, J.B. had told him that he had gone into the Times Building – he was challenged twice, but each time passed by saying he was on his way to the composing room – went into the basement and wrenched off a gas valve to maximize the destruction.

=== Other bombs ===
On the morning of October 1, Zeehandelaar's maid found a package behind a bush beneath a bedroom window. Police were called, and opened and disarmed the bomb. The spring of the mechanical clock had apparently been wound too tightly, slowing the clock, and preventing the bomb from exploding on time. The unexploded bomb contained valuable clues as to the bombers' method. In addition, investigators were able to trace the dynamite back to its source.

The caretaker at the Otis home heard of the Zeehandelaar bomb, and decided to search around the estate. He found a leather suitcase behind some bushes under a bay window. Again the police arrived, and carried the suitcase away from the house and out in the open. However, while they were cutting open the suitcase, the clockwork alarm went off inside the suitcase. The police ran to safety just before the bomb exploded. Investigators speculated that, like the Zeehandelaar bomb, the clock mechanism at the Otis house had been wound too tightly, delaying the explosion.

On the same night as the Times explosion, there was a reported attempted break-in at an auxiliary building, in which two men were chased off by a security guard. The incident was at first assumed to be another bombing attempt.

The IW strike committee in Los Angeles and Samuel Gompers, president of the American Federation of Labor (AFL), immediately condemned the bombing and claimed no labor union or individual could have been responsible.

=== Bombing returns to L.A. ===
After several months, it appeared that the Times bombers had escaped arrest and gone to ground. The IW decided it was time for more bombings in Los Angeles and sent McManigal with a list of five bombing targets, including the Times auxiliary printing plant, the Llewellyn Iron Works, the Baker Iron Works, and two non-union construction sites: the Los Angeles County Hall of Records and the Hotel Alexandria. J.J. told McManigal that he had promised the "coast bunch" a Christmas present, and wanted the explosions to take place on Christmas Day. McManigal set off a dynamite bomb at the Llewellyn Iron Works, partially wrecking the plant with the damage costing $25,000, but he found two of the other sites too closely guarded, and never visited the remaining two. J.J. was angry that only one of the sites was bombed, but McManigal told him that security was too tight.

== Tracking down the bombers ==
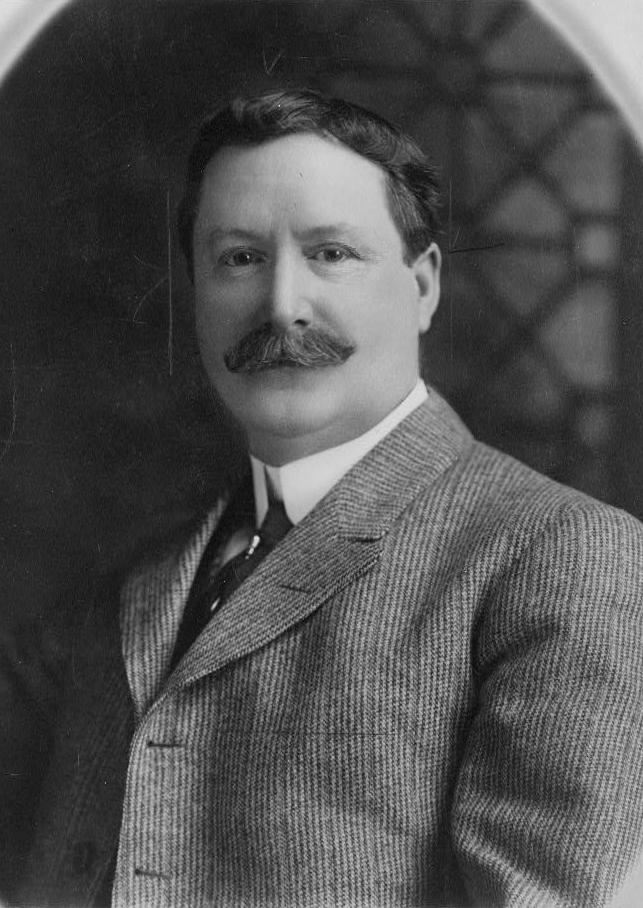
William J. Burns

The Times and law enforcement authorities announced that the perpetrators would be caught immediately, but weeks passed and no arrests were made. The City of Los Angeles posted a $25,000 reward for the capture of the bombers, and the M&M raised another $50,000.

On October 2, 1910, Mayor George Alexander hired private detective William J. Burns to catch the guilty parties. Burns had been investigating the nationwide wave of iron manufacturing plant bombings for the past four years on behalf of the NEA, and took the City job as part of his investigation. From Hockin, his paid IW spy, Burns learned that McManigal had been handling the union's bombing campaign on orders from union president Frank Ryan and secretary-treasurer J.J. McNamara. McManigal and J.J. were borderline alcoholics who liked to drink and hunt at the same time. Burns infiltrated one of their late-winter hunting trips with a spy, and during the trip J.J. boasted of having blown up the Times Building. The undercover private eye also surreptitiously took a photo of J.J. that Burns presented to a hotel clerk in Los Angeles, who recognized him as a "Mr. J. B. Bryce" who had checked in the day before the bombing and hurriedly checked out the following morning.

=== Arrest of J. B. McNamara and Ortie McManigal ===
On April 14, 1911, Burns, Burns' son Raymond, and police officers from Detroit and Chicago went to the Oxford Hotel in Detroit and arrested McManigal and J.B. McNamara. Dynamite, blasting caps and alarm clocks were found in their suitcases. The men were told they were being arrested for robbing a bank in Chicago. Since they had watertight alibis for that alleged crime, both men agreed to accompany Burns and the police officers back to Chicago.

In Chicago, McManigal and J.B. were not taken to a police station, but to the private home of Chicago Police Sergeant William Reed and held from April 13 until April 20. Burns apparently convinced McManigal that he knew everything and that McManigal could save himself by cutting a deal with authorities. McManigal agreed to tell all he knew in order to secure a lighter prison sentence, and signed a confession. He said that he had not participated in the Times bombing, but that J.B. had told him all about it, and that it was done by J.B. and two others, Matthew Schmidt and David Caplan (Schmidt and Caplan evaded arrest until 1915). McManigal also said that others involved included Ryan, J.J., Hockin and other IW leaders.

Burns wired California officials and secured extradition papers for McManigal and both McNamara brothers. Burns then left for Indianapolis, where the IW had their headquarters. With the assistance of officials of the NEA, he convinced Indiana Governor Thomas R. Marshall to issue an arrest warrant for J.J.

=== Raid on union headquarters and arrest of J. J. McNamara ===
On April 22, Burns and two local police detectives burst into an executive board meeting of the IW and arrested J.J. He was taken before a local circuit court, where the judge refused his request for an attorney and, without legal authority to do so, released him into the custody of Burns. From arrest to departure took thirty minutes. The same day, McManigal and J.B. were taken by Los Angeles police via train to California. All three men arrived in Los Angeles on April 26.

== Organized labor unites in defense of the McNamaras ==
The national labor movement was outraged by the way the McNamaras had been treated, and labor leaders were quick to defend the brothers' innocence. They contended that Burns had engaged in kidnapping, misrepresentation of his status as a law enforcement officer, and unlawful imprisonment in his handling of McManigal and J. B. McNamara. The local circuit judge had unlawfully denied J. J. McNamara access to legal representation and had no authority to approve his extradition. Both McNamaras had been arrested on the basis of a confession wrung from a third man who, they believed, had been kidnapped and perhaps coerced into confessing.

To many in organized labor, the McNamara case appeared to be a repeat of the Bill Haywood case of 1906. In that case, leaders of the Western Federation of Miners were accused of using dynamite to assassinate an ex-governor of Idaho. As in the McNamara case, a union member had confessed and implicated union leadership, the defendants were extradited in a highly irregular manner, and the prosecution's investigation was led by a detective with strong ties to anti-union business interests. In that case, the accused union leaders were found not guilty.

Labor leaders were also convinced of the McNamaras' innocence by other factors as well. The open shop movement and virulent hostility shown by Otis convinced many that the whole event was a frame-up (with some, including Eugene V. Debs, accusing Otis himself of bombing the Times Building). Burns repeatedly implied that Gompers and other labor leaders were involved in the national bombing campaign, and AFL officials feared a national campaign of arrests designed to destroy the nascent labor movement might be in the works. Meanwhile, George Alexander, Mayor of Los Angeles, was locked in a very close re-election battle against Job Harriman, a Socialist Party of America candidate. The bombing, some felt, might simply be a plot to keep Harriman out of City Hall.

Organized labor found J. J. McNamara an attractive figure to rally behind. By outward appearances, he did not look like a man who would dynamite his enemies. He was 34 years old, handsome, with an athletic build, always well-dressed and well-spoken. He had earned a law degree at night while working for the Iron Workers' Union. J. J. McNamara assured Gompers that he had nothing to do with the Times bombing. Gompers believed him completely, and threw all his influence behind the McNamaras. With Gompers' endorsement, the entire US labor movement supported the McNamaras, with parades, mass rallies, publicity campaigns, and donations to the McNamaras' defense fund.

Burns was offended by accusations from labor supporters that he had planted the evidence that he had seized at the union headquarters in Indianapolis. He was particularly critical of Samuel Gompers. Burns did not believe that Gompers was part of the dynamite plot, but blamed Gompers for being irresponsible in accusing Burns of framing the McNamaras, in the face of overwhelming evidence. Burns wrote that Gompers could not have been unaware of the four-year dynamiting campaign, which should have given him pause.

=== Gas explosion defense ===
The defense blamed the L.A. Times explosion on an accidental ignition of a gas leak, and denied that dynamite was in any way involved. The rest of the evidence, such as the other bombs found in Los Angeles the next morning, and all the material seized at union headquarters at Indianapolis, they claimed was planted. They accused Otis of taking advantage of a tragic accident to imprison union leaders on fabricated charges.

To support the accidental gas explosion theory, the State Federation of Labor of California appointed a committee to travel to Los Angeles and investigate the matter. The committee included a number of Western Federation of Miners members, who would have been familiar with dynamite. The committee reported back that there were no signs of a dynamite explosion at the Times building, and that it was solely a gas explosion. They also concluded that Otis knew that it was an accident, but had fabricated charges against the McNamaras, partly to discredit labor unions, and partly to evade blame for his negligence that allowed the gas accident to happen. The report declared:

On the other hand. those who are familiar with the peculiarities of explosions by dynamiting, the evidence furnishes an overwhelming certainty that there was no dynamite connected with the affair.

Some went farther. Eugene Debs accused Harrison Otis of blowing up his own building to frame labor leaders. He referred to the bombing as: "a job that General Otis did himself or had it done, for I know the man well."

== Clarence Darrow for the defense ==
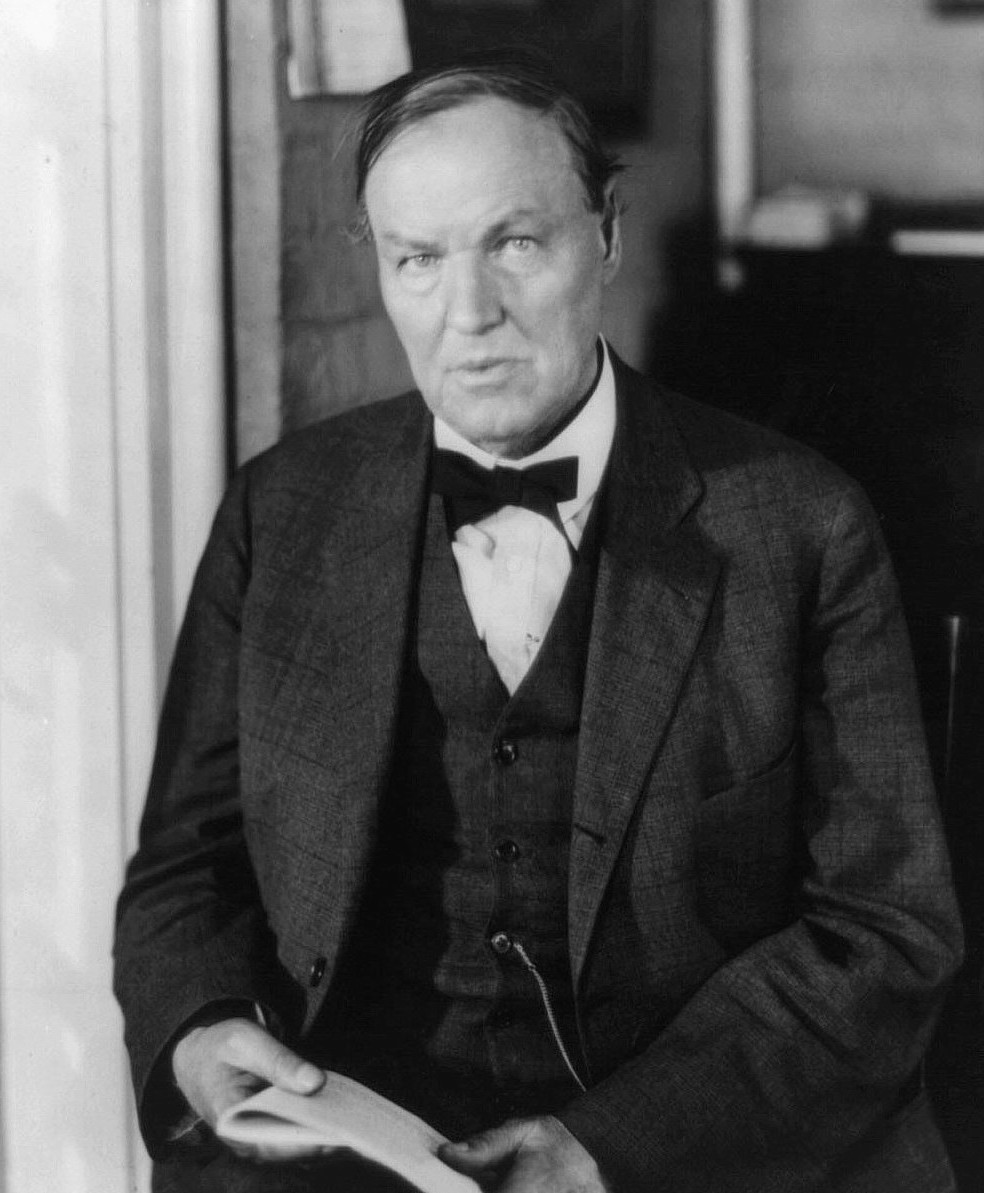
Clarence Darrow

Iron Workers president Frank Ryan asked Clarence Darrow to defend the McNamaras. Darrow had become a hero in labor circles for his successful defense of labor leader Bill Haywood in 1906. However, Darrow was in ill health, and although organized labor was convinced of the McNamaras' innocence, Darrow realized that the evidence against them was overwhelming and that the brothers were almost certainly guilty. Soon after the arrest, and before he agreed to represent the McNamaras, he confided this to a journalist as the reason he was reluctant to take the case. Ryan turned to Harriman, who agreed to be the brothers' defense attorney. Gompers, however, visited Darrow in Chicago and convinced him that the case required his expertise. Reluctantly, Darrow consented to be lead defense attorney. Harriman stayed on as his assistant. Darrow also recruited former Los Angeles county assistant district attorney Lecompte Davis, pro-union Indiana judge Cyrus F. McNutt, and president of the Los Angeles Chamber of Commerce Joseph Scott as co-counsel for the defense.

The McNamaras were arraigned on May 5, 1911. They pleaded not guilty. McManigal, who had turned state's evidence, was not charged at that time.

Darrow argued that he would need $350,000 ($12,000,000 in 2025) for the defense. The AFL, who had already paid Darrow a $50,000 retainer, immediately began to raise the additional funds. The AFL Executive Council established a permanent "Ways and Means Committee" to seek money. The federation appealed to local, state, regional and national unions to donate 25 cents per capita to the defense fund, and set up defense committees in larger cities throughout the nation to take donations.

Darrow also insisted that he needed popular support, to put political pressure on the prosecution. Pins, buttons and other paraphernalia were sold to raise money, and a film about J. J. McNamara—A Martyr to His Cause—was produced. It premiered in Cincinnati, Ohio, and an estimated 50,000 people paid to see it. Labor Day throughout the nation was declared to be "McNamara Day", and mass marches were held in 13 major cities in support of the defendants.

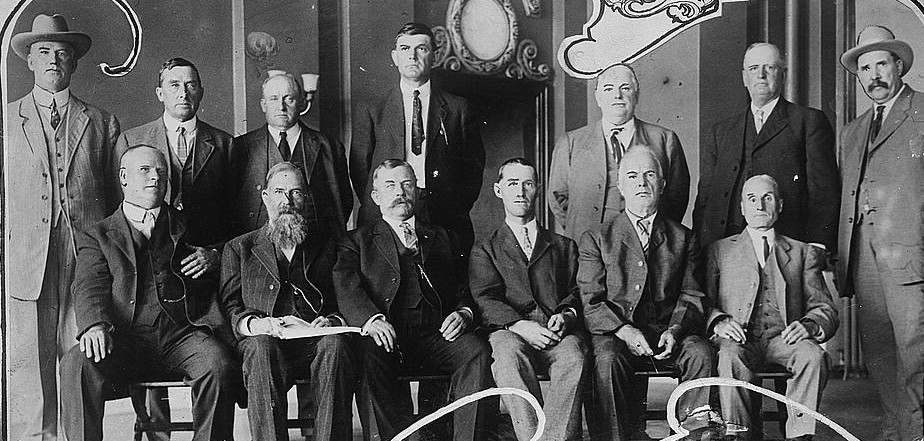
Members of the pool from which the jury was chosen.

Jury selection began on October 25. As voir dire continued, Darrow became increasingly concerned about the outcome of the trial. He felt J. B. could not be relied on as a witness and would break down under cross-examination. On October 15, he learned that the prosecution had acquired masses of evidence to support 21 separate charges. On October 18, he learned that U.S. Attorney General George W. Wickersham had obtained enough evidence on his own to secure, with President William Howard Taft's approval, a federal subpoena against the McNamaras. The first panel of jurors was exhausted on October 25, forcing the court to order an additional panel of jurors to appear. The jury was finally seated on November 7.

=== Plea negotiations ===
As jury selection continued, muckraking journalist Lincoln Steffens arrived in Los Angeles. Steffens, convinced the McNamaras were guilty, visited them in jail. Steffens proposed to defend their actions in print as "justifiable dynamiting" in the face of employer violence and state-sponsored repression of labor unions. J.B. was an eager proponent of Steffens' plans, but J.J. refused to cooperate unless Darrow agreed. Darrow was stunned by Steffens' report that the brothers had admitted their guilt to him, but with his health worsening and his pessimism about the defense growing, Darrow agreed to permit the McNamaras to cooperate with Steffens.

The weekend of November 19–20, Darrow and Steffens met with newspaper publisher E. W. Scripps. During their discussions of the trial, Darrow raised the possibility of pressuring the prosecution into accepting a plea bargain. In exchange for light prison terms for the McNamaras, the AFL would end its debilitating strike and organizing efforts against Los Angeles employers. Steffens met with Otis and Harry Chandler, Otis' son-in-law and assistant general manager at the Los Angeles Times. Both men agreed to the plan. The success of the AFL's public opinion campaign had apparently worried both newspapermen, and the Iron Workers' success in maintaining (even widening) the strike had weakened the resolve of many in the Los Angeles business community. Chandler offered to open negotiations with the district attorney, John D. Fredericks.

Although a group of Los Angeles businessmen had endorsed the secret talks, they had no legal power over the prosecutor. Fredericks refused to sanction any plan which let the McNamaras go free. The National Erectors' Association had learned of the talks (both the defense and prosecution had their paid spies in the other's camp), and was pressing Fredericks to reject any plea bargain. As a compromise, Fredericks demanded that J.B. receive life in prison and J.J. receive a much shorter term.

=== McNamaras plead guilty ===
The agreement was laid before the McNamara brothers. J. B. initially refused to agree to any plea bargain that did not set his brother free. But when Darrow told him that a settlement was possible only if both brothers pleaded guilty, J. B. gave his consent. Darrow sent for a representative of the AFL. The shocked labor leader refused to accept the agreement until Darrow convinced him that the defense had almost no chance.

Darrow had hoped that a plea bargain (rather than an admission of guilt in open court) would be all that was needed. But Los Angeles employers were worried that defense attorney Harriman would trounce Mayor Alexander on election day (December 5). Nothing short of an actual admission of guilt in open court would discredit Harriman and prevent his victory, and the employers were pressing hard for one.

The defense's position weakened further when, on November 28, Darrow was accused of attempted bribery of a juror. The defense team's chief investigator had been arrested for bribing a juror, and Darrow had been seen in public passing the investigator money. With Darrow himself on the verge of being discredited, the defense's hope for a simple plea agreement ended.

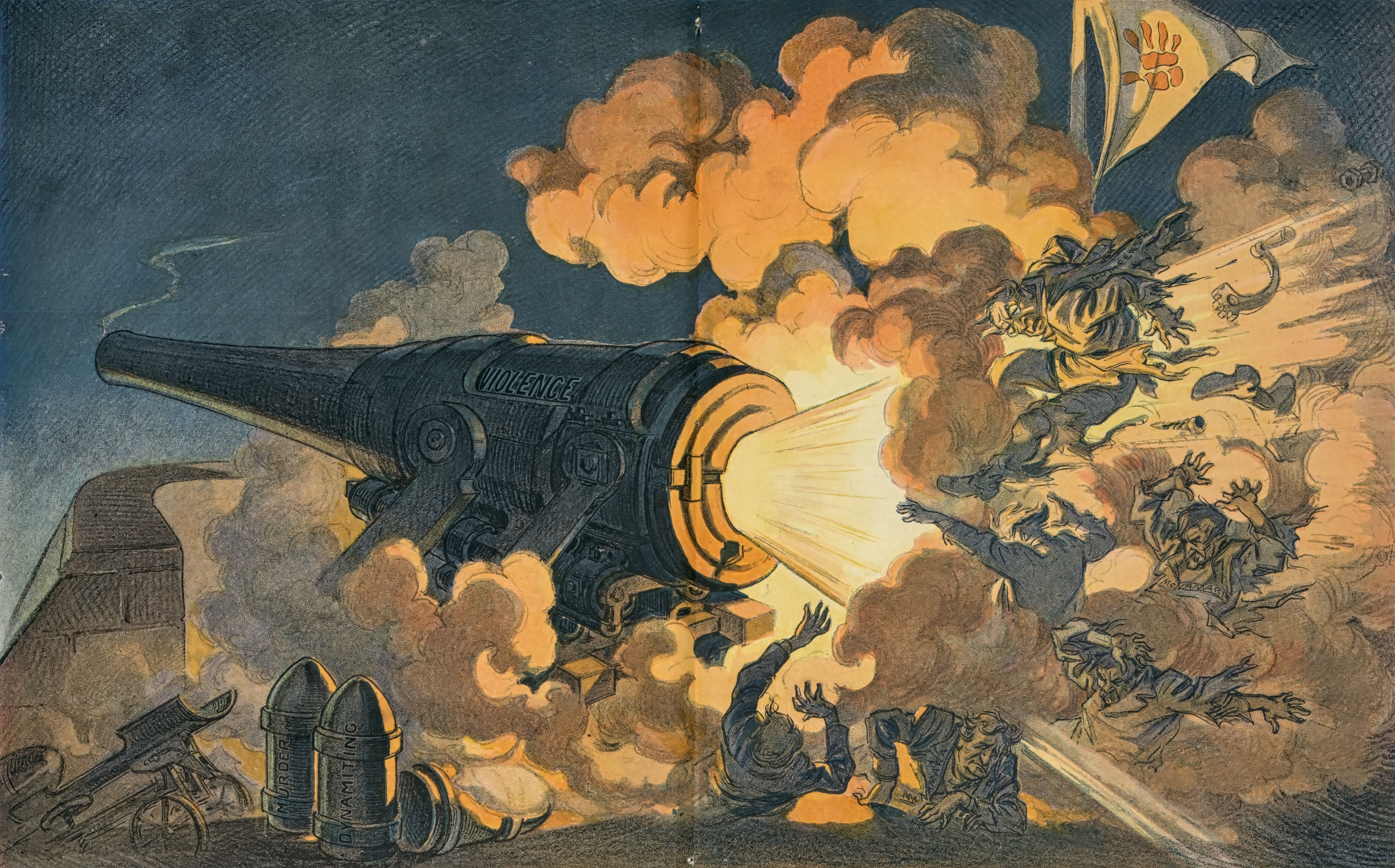
Puck magazine edition of December 27, 1911 (v. 70, no. 1817) depicting the flareback of the bombing.

On December 1, 1911, the McNamara brothers changed their pleas in open court to guilty. James B. McNamara admitted to murder by having set the bomb that destroyed the Los Angeles Times Building on October 1, 1910. John J. McNamara, setting foot for the first time in court, admitted to having ordered the bombing of the Llewellyn Iron Works on December 25. J.J. McNamara later told an interviewer that Darrow had kept the McNamara brothers isolated from public opinion. Had they known how strongly the public was on their side, they would not have agreed to the plea deal, he claimed.

At his sentencing hearing, Jim McNamara's confession was read in court:

I, James B. McNamera, having heretofore pleaded guilty to the crime of murder, desire to make this statement of facts: On the night of September 30, 1920, at 5:45 p.m., I placed in Ink Alley, a portion of the Times building, a suitcase containing sixteen sticks of 80 per cent dynamite, set to explode at one o'clock the next morning. It was my intention to injure the building and scare the owners. I sincerely regret that these unfortunate men lost their lives. If the giving of my life would bring them back I would gladly give it. In fact, in pleading guilty to murder in the first degree I have placed my life in the hands of the state.

Judge Bordwell rejected the defendants' assertions that they did not intend to harm the Times workers:

A man who would put sixteen sticks of 80 per cent dynamite in a building * * * in which you, as a printer, knew gas was burning in many places, and in which you knew there were scores of human beings toiling, must have no regard whatever for the lives of his fellow beings. He must have been a murderer at heart.

After sentencing, Judge Bordwell issued a long statement minimizing the role of Lincoln Steffens in bringing about the plea deal. Bordwell wrote that the prosecution had long sought a plea deal, but could not agree to J. B.'s insistence that his brother go free. The judge stated that what really broke the deadlock was the arrest of Bert Franklin, a detective hired by the defense, on a charge of attempted bribery of jurors. The bribery attempt, he wrote, revealed how desperate the defense was, and forced them to agree to a prison sentence for J. J.

=== Reactions to the guilty pleas ===
Prosecutor Fredericks justified the plea deal because by having the McNamaras plead guilty, he said, there would be no doubt of their guilt; without a guilty plea, their supporters would always believe that they were framed.

Darrow was later criticized for misleading and pressuring the McNamaras into each pleading guilty. There remained a suspicion that, following the arrest of his chief jury investigator Burt Franklin on charges of attempted bribery of jurors, Darrow needed to hurry up the guilty pleas, because he knew that he would be accused of attempted bribery as well, and one of his defenses would be that a plea deal had already been agreed upon, so that he had no motive to bribe jurors. Darrow defended the guilty pleas by citing the overwhelming evidence against the brothers:

From the first there was never the slightest chance to win. To those who say it would have been better to have gone to trial and suffered complete defeat, I would call attention to the fact that there were thirty or forty hotel registers, three in Los Angeles, many in San Francisco and others in different parts of the country. There were scores of witnesses to identify J. B. McNamara as being present practically on the very day, and one at least, in the building. There was overwhelming evidence of all kinds, which no one could have surmounted if they would.

Following the guilty pleas, Darrow was criticized for using deception to raise money for his clients' defense: allowing supporters to believe in their innocence, in order to raise a war chest of $200,000 from contributions by working men, and spend about $100,000 of it to mount an expensive effort, while knowing all along that the McNamara brothers were guilty. Darrow said that his first duty was to his clients, and that he did whatever needed to raise the funds for the best defense possible.

Samuel Gompers was traveling by rail in New Jersey when the change in plea was made. A reporter with the Associated Press boarded his train, woke him, and handed him the dispatch regarding the guilty verdicts. "I am astounded, I am astounded", he said. "The McNamaras have betrayed labor."

The Socialist Party, however, refused to condemn the McNamara brothers, arguing that their actions were justified in view of the supposed employer- and state-sponsored terror their union had faced for the last 25 years. Haywood and Debs echoed that sentiment. Wrote Debs:

It is easy enough for a gentleman of education and refinement to sit at his typewriter and point out the crimes of the workers. But let him be one of them himself, reared in hard poverty, denied education, thrown into the brute struggle for existence from childhood, oppressed, exploited, forced to strike, clubbed by the police, jailed while his family is evicted, and his wife and children are hungry, and he will hesitate to condemn these as criminals who fight against the crimes of which they are the victims of such savage methods as have been forced upon them by their masters.

Darrow's co-counsel on the McNamara case, Job Harriman, was defeated by Mayor Alexander in a landslide loss on December 5. Although Harriman had run ahead of Alexander in the 5-way primary, winning 44% of the vote to Alexander's 37%, following the McNamara confession Harriman received just 38% of the votes in the runoff.

The two brothers entered San Quentin State Prison on December 9. J.B. McNamara's post-trial conclusion was: "You see? ... The whole damn world believes in dynamite."

== Big trial in Indianapolis ==
As part of the McNamara brothers' plea bargain, Los Angeles prosecutors had agreed not to pursue other labor union officials for the L.A. bombings. But the federal government was not a party to the agreement, and in 1912 brought charges against 54 union men, mostly national and local officials of the Iron Workers Union, for involvement in a five-year nationwide campaign of dynamite. Because such things as murder or destruction of property were not federal crimes, the defendants were charged with the federal crime of conspiracy to illegally transport dynamite on railroad trains. A number of different attorneys represented different defendants, but leading the defense was sitting US senator from Indiana, John W. Kern.

Leading up to the trial, the number of defendants was reduced from 54 to 48. The McNamara brothers were dropped from the trial because they were already imprisoned in California; two more pleaded guilty; one was a fugitive and could not be found; and the trial of one was delayed because of an injury. Judge A. B. Anderson dismissed charges against eight men after the trial started, for lack of evidence.

Frank Eckhoff, a friend of John J. McNamara, testified that, following the Times bombing, James B. McNamara had asked him to murder Mary Dye, a stenographer at union headquarters, because "she knew too much." Jim McNamara had wanted him to plant an explosive under her seat on a commuter train. Eckhoff had refused.

On December 28, 1912, the jury found 38 of the remaining 40 guilty. Two days later, Judge Anderson handed out sentences, calling the dynamite campaign "a veritable reign of terror," and commenting:

The evidence shows some of these defendants to be guilty of murder, but they are not charged with that crime; this court cannot punish them for it, nor should it be influenced by such consideration in fixing the measure punishment for the crimes charged.

Six defendants were given suspended sentences. Union president Frank Ryan was handed the longest sentence, seven years. Six more men, including San Francisco labor leader Olaf Tveitmoe and prosecution informer Herbert Hockin, were given six years. The others received sentences of between a year and a day and four years. All prisoners were sent to the federal penitentiary at Leavenworth, Kansas.

Thirty defendants appealed. In June 1914, the US Seventh Circuit Court of Appeals reversed and ordered new trials for five of the convictions, including that of Olaf Tveitmoe. In the case of Tveitmoe, the court ruled that evidence implicating him in the Los Angeles Times bombing was irrelevant to the federal charges, because that incident did not involve interstate transportation of dynamite. Citing abundant evidence in the trial record, the court upheld the remaining 25 convictions. The following month, the US district attorney announced that, in light of the court of appeals ruling, that the government would not retry the five defendants whose convictions were reversed; the five were released.

The Iron Workers suffered severe membership losses, and appealed to the AFL for funds. The AFL declined to offer financial assistance but instead reiterated their support and sent a number of high ranking AFL officials, including Gompers, to speak at the next convention of the Bridge and Structural Iron Workers convention. With the encouragement of the AFL and a speech endorsing the action by Gompers, the Iron Workers delegates re-elected Ryan president.

== Final cases: Caplan and Schmidt ==
After the Indianapolis trials, the only cases remaining were of David Caplan and Matthew Schmidt, two anarchists who had helped Jim McNamara buy the dynamite used in the Los Angeles bombings. Both were indicted in 1911, but they became fugitives and evaded the police.

On July 4, 1914, a dynamite bomb exploded in a New York tenement apartment occupied by three anarchists. All three men died in the explosion, which destroyed the building, killed a woman in the next apartment, and injured many more. Police speculated that the bomb was intended to be used the following day in Tarrytown, New York, where a number of anarchists, including one of the dead bombers, were due to face charges connected with attempted invasion of the Rockefeller summer estate. The incident seemed unconnected with the Iron Workers bombings, but William J. Burns learned that fragments of the bomb showed similar construction to the Los Angeles Times bombs.

Based on the similarity of bombs, Burns concentrated his search on anarchist circles in New York City. He found Matthew Schmidt, and was at the scene when New York City policemen arrested Schmidt on February 13, 1915. Burns' agents had been watching Schmidt for some time, hoping to arrest Caplan as well, but finally settled for Schmidt alone. But a search of Schmidt's belongings found a letter that led them to the Seattle area, where local police arrested David Caplan on February 18, 1915.

San Francisco labor leader Olaf Tveitmoe, who had been released from prison the previous year, promised that the two men would be defended at the expense of West Coast labor unions. The Carpenter, official organ of the Carpenters Union, blamed the prosecution of Caplan and Schmidt on "the enemies of labor."

Schmidt and Caplan were tried separately in Los Angeles. Matthew Schmidt was convicted of murder in December 1915, and received life imprisonment. Upon his conviction, Olaf Tveitmoe, secretary of the California Building Trades Council said: "There will be ten years' war in Los Angeles. They will pay for this."

David Caplan's first trial ended in a deadlocked jury. In December 1916, a second jury found him guilty of second degree manslaughter. The court sentenced him to ten years in prison. He was released in 1923 after 6 1/2 years, with time off for good behavior.

== Aftermath ==
The labor movement in Los Angeles collapsed, and union membership in the city remained minuscule almost a century later. Employers refused to honor additional terms of the plea agreement, which required the convening of a meeting of labor union and employers and an end to the open shop campaign. Instead, employers redoubled their efforts to break the labor movement in Los Angeles. The Central Labor Council suffered severe membership losses in the early months of 1912, and the labor movement in the city did not begin to show signs of growth until the 1950s.

Darrow was indicted on two charges of jury tampering. His chief investigator turned state's evidence, and even implicated Samuel Gompers in the bribery attempt. Darrow was in financial difficulty, and asked for AFL assistance in raising funds for his defense. Gompers declined to give it. When the presidents of the United Mine Workers of America and Western Federation of Miners issued an appeal for donations, the AFL Executive Council postponed consideration of a donation until the issue was moot. Darrow was acquitted in his first trial. When charges were brought in the second bribery case, the trial ended in a hung jury.

Journalist Lincoln Steffens was so troubled by the vituperation heaped on the McNamara brothers that he began a campaign to ease economic and class differences in the United States. By mid-1912, a number of prominent individuals — including social workers Jane Addams and Lillian Wald, industrialist Henry Morgenthau, Sr., journalist Paul Kellogg, jurist Louis Brandeis, economist Irving Fisher, and pacifist minister John Haynes Holmes—had asked President Taft to appoint a commission on industrial relations to ease economic tensions in the country. Taft requested that Congress approve a commission, and it did so on August 23, 1912. The reports of the Commission on Industrial Relations, led by Frank P. Walsh, helped establish the eight-hour day and the World War I-era War Labor Board, and profoundly influenced most New Deal labor legislation.

Ortie McManigal served two and a half years in prison before being released on parole.

J. B. McNamara became a hero to radicals who believed in violence. Although he had not previously been political, he embraced violent radicalism in return. Despite repeated attempts by left-wing labor leaders and certain politicians to win his release, he refused to file any parole requests. James B. "J.B." McNamara died of cancer in San Quentin on March 9, 1941.

J. J. McNamara left prison after nine years, and the Iron Workers' union welcomed him back as an organizer. He was convicted of threatening the destruction of a building unless the contractor hired union members, and was sent back to prison. Released once more, the union discovered that he had embezzled $200, and fired him. J. J. spent the rest of his life drifting from job to job, and died in Butte, Montana, on May 8, 1941.

== See also ==
- Domestic terrorism in the United States
- Anarchism and violence
- Propaganda of the deed
- September 1920 Wall Street bombing
- Palmer Raids
- Espionage Act of 1917
- 1919 United States anarchist bombings
- Milwaukee Police Department bombing
- Anton Johannsen, a carpenter indicted but not charged
- List of homicides in California
