= Charles Navarro =

American politician

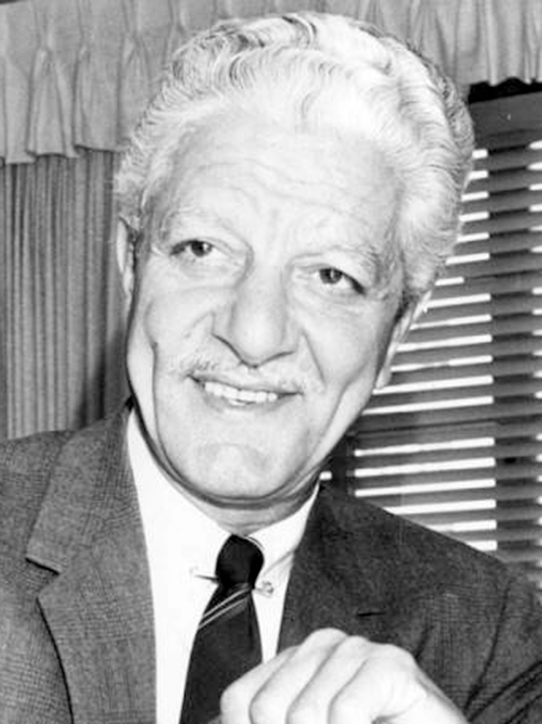
- Navarro in 1961

13th Los Angeles City Controller
- In office July 1, 1961 – June 30, 1977
- Preceded by: Daniel O. Hoye
- Succeeded by: Ira Reiner

Member of the Los Angeles City Council for the 10th district
- In office July 1, 1951 – June 30, 1961
- Preceded by: G. Vernon Bennett
- Succeeded by: Joe E. Hollingsworth

Personal details
- Born: January 19, 1904 New York City, New York, U.S.
- Died: September 7, 2005 (aged 101)
- Political party: Republican

Charles Navarro Guarino (January 19, 1904 – September 7, 2005) was an American politician. He was a Los Angeles City Council member between 1951 and 1961 and city controller from 1961 to 1977.

== Biography ==
Navarro was born in New York City to Italian immigrant parents. He was a self-taught guitarist and banjo player who moved to Los Angeles when he was 19 to be a professional musician. He worked for Paramount and Universal Studios. He also owned an apartment building on San Marino Street in Los Angeles. Navarro was married to Rose Northey for 70 years, then married Seda Stevens.

Navarro retired in 1977 and spent the last 28 years of his life overseeing his investments and enjoying "dining at his favorite Westside steakhouses. . . . At 100-plus he was walking without a cane, driving his Cadillac and going to church every Sunday." He died in his sleep at the age of 101 on September 7, 2005, and was survived by his wife and a stepson, Armen Haig Stevens.

== Political career ==
=== City Council ===
1951
At the beginning of 1951, four candidates had begun their campaigns for election to Los Angeles's 10th District seat on the City Council — the incumbent, G. Vernon Bennett, as well as Assemblyman Vernon Kilpatrick, 1332 Hope Street; Sam B. Whitworth, 2106 Wilmot Street; Charles Downs, 1607 Venice Blvd.; and Navarro, 2700 San Marino Street. Downs was a former City Council member who had lost his seat and went to prison in 1925 on a corruption charge. The district was "in the south-central section of the city," bounded by Wilshire and Jefferson boulevards and La Brea Avenue and Main Street.

The Los Angeles Times, which favored Navarro's election, wrote of him:

In a district which has been a favorite haunt for left-wingers for some considerable time, Navarro comes right out and says he's downright against all kinds of bureaucracy, Socialism or any other kind of ism. . . . Although the Council job is supposedly nonpartisan, he's up against two old-line, left-wing Democrats, G. Vernon Bennett, the incumbent, and Assemblyman Vernon Kilpatrick, who's willing to ditch his State post for a city job if he can get it. Bennett, 16 years in the Council, is nearing 70 and during recent months was in trouble with the police. He appears to be on the way out.

The April primary was seen as a dirty one: "Three of the candidates were accused of having police records, one of being an ex-convict. Another was linked with activities of the Communist Party." Navarro came in second, with 5,077 votes to 5,301 for Kilpatrick, 3,835 for Bennett, 2,250 for Hubbard and 1,423 for Downs. Bennett promptly sued for Navarro's disqualification on the grounds that he had not listed his birth name on the ballot. Navarro answered that he had dropped his last name, Guarino, "because the first two were better suited to his work as a professional musician." A Superior Court judge dismissed Bennett's claim. Navarro won the May election, 9,001 votes to Kilpatrick's 7,321.

1953
In the 1953 election, Navarro had four opponents: "John A. Somerville, Negro dentist and a member of the Municipal Police Commission; Courtland G. Mitchell, Negro real estate man; Charles Downs, contractor, and Ben F. Hayes, insurance investigator." Navarro won with 14,892 votes over Somerville, 8,316; Hayes, 2,781; Downs, 1,385, and Mitchell, 901.

1955
The 1955 election in the 10th District was the closest ever seen in Los Angeles, not being decided until a count of absentee ballots. The final returns were 11,336 for Navarro, the victor, 6,236 for African-American businessman George L. Thomas; 3,086 for African-American newspaper publisher Louis Lomax; 1,555 for automobile dealer Milton Mackaig; and 477 for pet shop proprietor Sam B. Whitworth.

=== City controller ===
Navarro announced in December 1960 his determination to unseat 70-year-old Dan O. Hoye, who had been city controller for 24 years and who said that his ambition was to equal the 28-year record of his predecessor in office, John Myers. Navarro, chairman of the City Council's finance committee, was endorsed by the president of the Merchants and Manufacturers Association and the Los Angeles Times. Navarro won the election, 187,122 votes against 133,569 for Hoye, 67,318 for certified public accountant Harry C. Fischer and 25.683 for management consultant Cecil R. Kay.

The city controller was unopposed in the next two elections: He received 470,324 votes in 1965 and 379,971 in 1969. He won the 1973 election, with 300,511 votes against 56,924 for Democratic businessman David Gold. Other 1973 candidates were Hoag, 34,428 votes; Day, 27,957; Blount, 26,458; Taylor, 17,086, and Rees, 11,667.

Navarro testified twice before City Council committees in opposition to proposals to make the city controller an appointive office rather than elective — in 1969 and in 1977.

He testified also in the 1975 trial of a woman who was charged with taking part in a "multimillion dollar plan to defraud the Los Angeles municipal treasury by cashing stolen city checks." He said his signature had been forged. The same year he persuaded the City Council to purchase two check-writing machines that "would make forging a controller's signature virtually impossible."

Navarro left office in 1977.

Political offices
Preceded by Daniel O. Hoye	Los Angeles City Controller; 1961–77	Succeeded by Ira Reiner
Preceded by G. Vernon Bennett	Los Angeles City Council; 10th District; 1951–61	Succeeded by Joe E. Hollingsworth
