= Gil Garcetti =

American politician and attorney

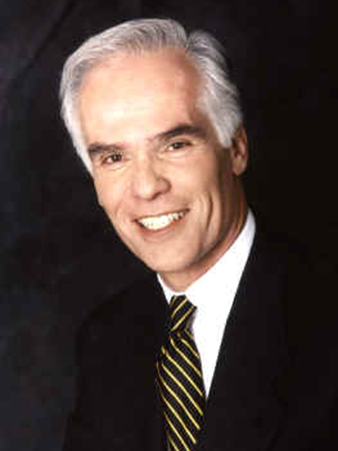
- Official portrait, 1992

40th District Attorney of Los Angeles County
- In office December 7, 1992 – December 4, 2000
- Preceded by: Ira Reiner
- Succeeded by: Steve Cooley

Personal details
- Born: Gilbert Salvador Iberri Garcetti; August 5, 1941 (age 85) Los Angeles, California, U.S.
- Party: Democratic
- Spouse: Sukey Roth
- Children: 2, including Eric
- Education: University of Southern California (BA); University of California, Los Angeles (JD)

Gilbert Salvador Iberri Garcetti (born August 5, 1941) is an American politician and lawyer. He served as Los Angeles County's 40th district attorney for two terms, from 1992 until November 7, 2000. He is the father of former U.S. Ambassador to India and former Los Angeles Mayor Eric Garcetti.

== Early life and education ==
Garcetti was born in Los Angeles on August 5, 1941, the son of Salvador Garcetti and Juanita Iberri. His father was born in Parral, Chihuahua, Mexico, and brought to the United States as a child after his own father, Massimo Garcetti, a judge and immigrant to Mexico from Italy, was hanged during the Mexican Revolution. Gil's mother was born in Arizona, one of nineteen children born to a father whose parents were from Sonora, Mexico, and a mother born in Arizona, to Mexican parents.

In 1959 Garcetti graduated from George Washington High School in South Los Angeles. The school has since become Washington Preparatory High School.

Garcetti received a bachelor's degree in management from the University of Southern California and a Juris Doctor from the University of California, Los Angeles.

== Career ==
Before becoming Los Angeles County District Attorney, Garcetti served within the office for over twenty years, from trial prosecutor to managerial positions and eventually becoming chief deputy district attorney for his predecessor, Ira Reiner (district attorney from 1984 to 1992). Reiner demoted Garcetti shortly after his 1988 re-election.

Garcetti challenged his former mentor in the 1992 election. The campaign featured both candidates saying their opponent was corrupt. Reiner said Garcetti was a "secretive" person and "(was) not to be trusted in a position of power." Garcetti bested Reiner in the non-partisan June primary (where the top two candidates would advance should no candidate win an absolute majority), taking 34 percent to Reiner's 25, outpacing the incumbent by more than 100,000 votes. In September 1992, just two months before the general election, Reiner announced that he was suspending his campaign, saying he could not stomach the negative tactics he felt that were needed to win. California law allowed candidates to be removed from the ballot only if they died more than 59 days before the election, so Reiner remained on the ballot. Garcetti won the general election with more than 81 percent of the vote.

=== Los Angeles District Attorney ===
Entering the 1992 elections, Los Angeles County, California was still recovering from the aftermath of the 1992 Los Angeles riots. His first term was dominated by his office's prosecution of the O. J. Simpson murder case. The long, costly criminal trial ended with a "not guilty" verdict on October 3, 1995. Despite the setback, Garcetti won re-election in 1996, narrowly defeating challenger John Lynch.

Garcetti focused both his terms working to solve a number of issues including domestic violence, hate crimes, welfare fraud and combating LA's street gangs. In late 1999 the LAPD's Rampart scandal erupted with allegations of extreme police misconduct from the city's Rampart Division which likely contributed to Garcetti's defeat in the 2000 election.

Garcetti was challenged for re-election in 2000 by Steve Cooley, a veteran of the L.A. County D.A.'s office. In a situation much like Garcetti's demotion in 1988 that led him to challenge Reiner in 1992, Cooley was demoted by Garcetti after Garcetti's 1996 re-election after Cooley supported Garcetti's opponent, John Lynch.

Garcetti came in second in a competitive three-person primary, taking 37 percent of the vote to Cooley's 39. In the two-person runoff, Garcetti lost overwhelmingly, losing by a margin of approximately 64 to 36 percent.

== Other activities ==
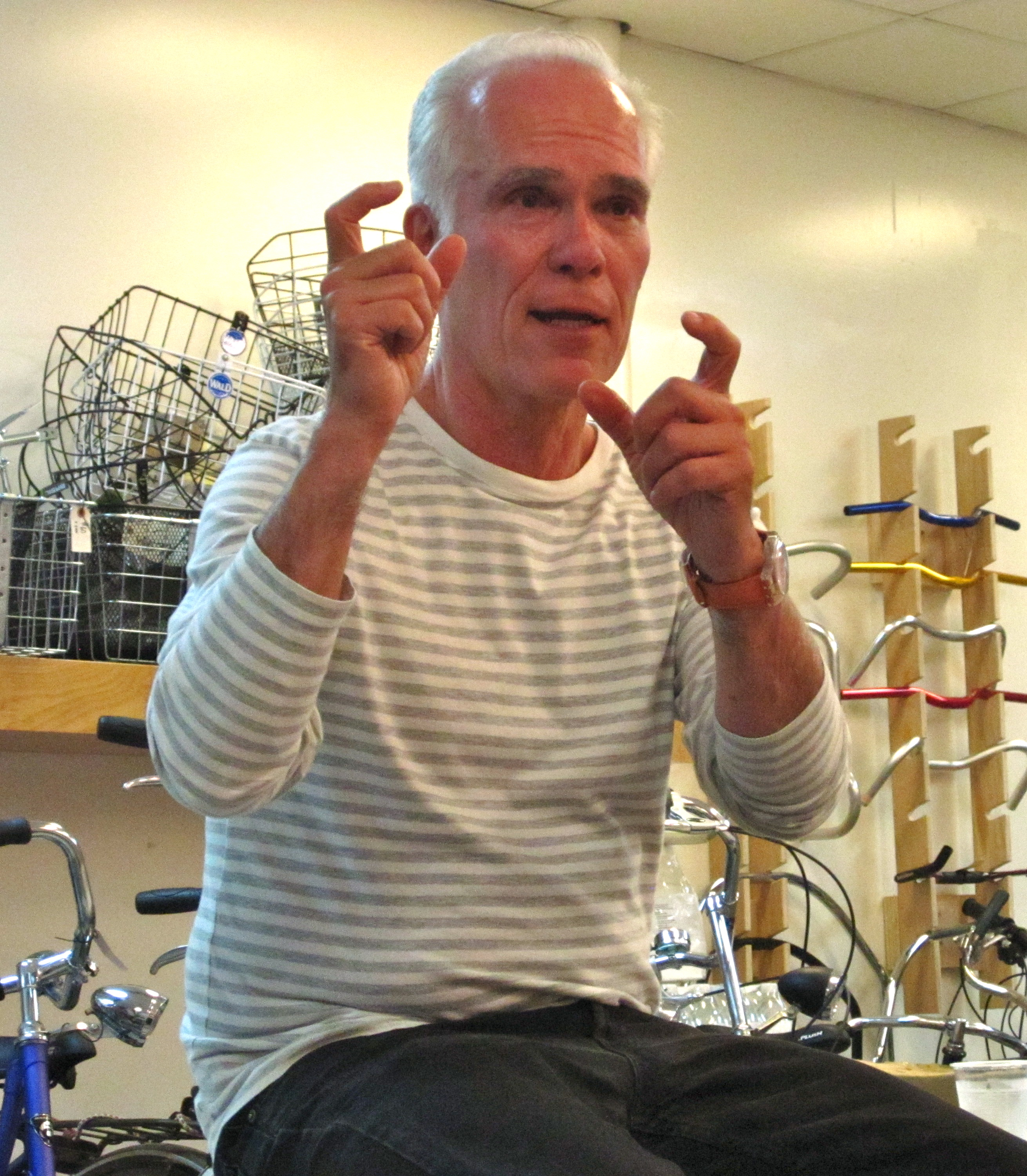
Garcetti in 2010.

=== Politics ===
The 2000 election ended Garcetti's 32-year career with the LA County district attorney's office. In 2002, Los Angeles City Council president Alex Padilla appointed Garcetti to the Los Angeles city ethics commission for a five-year term. In the fall of 2002, Garcetti was a fellow at the Institute of Politics at the John F. Kennedy School of Government at Harvard University. He has been developing a foundation to help Latino and African-American students complete their high school education. He is currently a strong proponent of Proposition 34, an initiative that will replace the death penalty with life in prison without the possibility of parole. Garcetti has argued that the death penalty is broken beyond repair, that it is "horrendously expensive" and that it carries the risk of executing an innocent person.

=== Photography ===
After leaving the DA's office, Garcetti focused on art photography, producing two collections on the Walt Disney Concert Hall: Iron: Erecting the Walt Disney Concert Hall (Balcony Press 2002), focusing on the ironworkers who constructed the landmark, and Frozen Music (Balcony Press 2003), focusing on the finished building itself. Photos from these works were featured in an exhibit at the National Building Museum in Washington, D.C., and at the Pasadena Museum of California Art. His most recent exhibition, Dance in Cuba: Photographs by Gil Garcetti (Balcony Press 2005), was featured at the UCLA Fowler Museum of Cultural History in Spring 2006. Water is Key: A Better Future for Africa (Balcony Press 2007) was published via a grant from the Conrad N. Hilton Foundation to the Pacific Institute as a benefit to NGOs supporting clean water projects in Africa.

=== The Closer ===
Gil Garcetti was a consulting producer on the TNT series The Closer from its debut in 2005 and Major Crimes from its debut in 2012.

His son, Los Angeles City Councilmember, Eric Garcetti, appeared as the fictional Mayor of Los Angeles Ramon Quintero, in two episodes each of both series, before becoming the real-life Mayor of Los Angeles in 2013. In his first appearance, father and son appeared together onscreen, with Gil playing the LAPD Chief of Police.

== Personal life ==
Garcetti was married to Sukey Roth, who is of Russian Jewish descent.

Gil and Sukey Garcetti have two children. Their son, Eric, was elected to the LA City Council three times (2001, 2005, 2009) and twice as mayor of Los Angeles (2013, 2017), before becoming U.S. Ambassador to India in 2023. Their daughter, Dana Garcetti-Boldt, a former deputy district attorney in Garcetti's office, became an acupuncturist. She later returned to the law and is now serving as a Los Angeles County Deputy Public Defender.

Garcetti was portrayed by Bruce Greenwood in the 2016 miniseries The People v. O. J. Simpson: American Crime Story and by Mark Moses in the 2017 miniseries Law & Order True Crime: The Menendez Murders.

== Electoral history ==
Los Angeles County District Attorney primary election, 1992
Party	Candidate	Votes	%
Non-partisan	Gil Garcetti	488,985	34.01
Non-partisan	Ira Reiner (incumbent)	367,984	25.59
Non-partisan	Robert K. Tanenbaum	272,841	18.97
Non-partisan	Sterling E. Morris	198,125	13.78
Non-partisan	Howard Johnson	109,742	7.63

Los Angeles County District Attorney election, 1992
Party	Candidate	Votes	%
Non-partisan	Gil Garcetti	2,061,218	81.64
Non-partisan	Ira Reiner (incumbent)	463,247	18.35

Los Angeles County District Attorney primary election, 1996
Party	Candidate	Votes	%
Non-partisan	Gil Garcetti (incumbent)	436,240	37.35
Non-partisan	John F. Lynch	251,590	21.54
Non-partisan	Malcolm Jordan	196,488	16.82
Non-partisan	Harold Greenberg	172,591	14.78
Non-partisan	Sterling E. Morris	83,220	7.12
Non-partisan	Steve S. Zand	27,595	2.36

Los Angeles County District Attorney election, 1996
Party	Candidate	Votes	%
Non-partisan	Gil Garcetti (incumbent)	1,124,631	50.1
Non-partisan	John F. Lynch	1,119,865	49.89

Los Angeles County District Attorney primary election, 2000
Party	Candidate	Votes	%
Non-partisan	Steve Cooley	573,236	38.31
Non-partisan	Gil Garcetti (incumbent)	558,066	37.3
Non-partisan	Barry Groveman	364,902	24.39

Los Angeles County District Attorney election, 2000
Party	Candidate	Votes	%
Non-partisan	Steve Cooley	1,448,418	63.77
Non-partisan	Gil Garcetti (incumbent)	822,846	36.23

== See also ==
- Garcetti v. Ceballos
- O.J.: Made in America

== Additional sources ==
- Robert Greene, Former District Attorney Gil Garcetti Nominated to City Ethics Commission, Metropolitan News-Enterprise, August 15, 2002; accessed May 19, 2006
- Benjamin Parke, D.A. Gil Garcetti criticized for Belmont school failure, Rampart scandal, Daily Bruin, February 10, 2000; accessed May 19, 2006
- Scott Simon, The Legacy of the O.J. Simpson Case, Weekend Edition (NPR), June 12, 2004; accessed May 19, 2006
- Scott Simon, Garcetti Photos Capture Disney Hall, Ironworkers, Weekend Edition (NPR), September 11, 2004; accessed May 19, 2006

Legal offices
Preceded by Ira Reiner	Los Angeles County District Attorney; 1992–2000	Succeeded by Steve Cooley
