= Daniel O. Hoye =

American politician

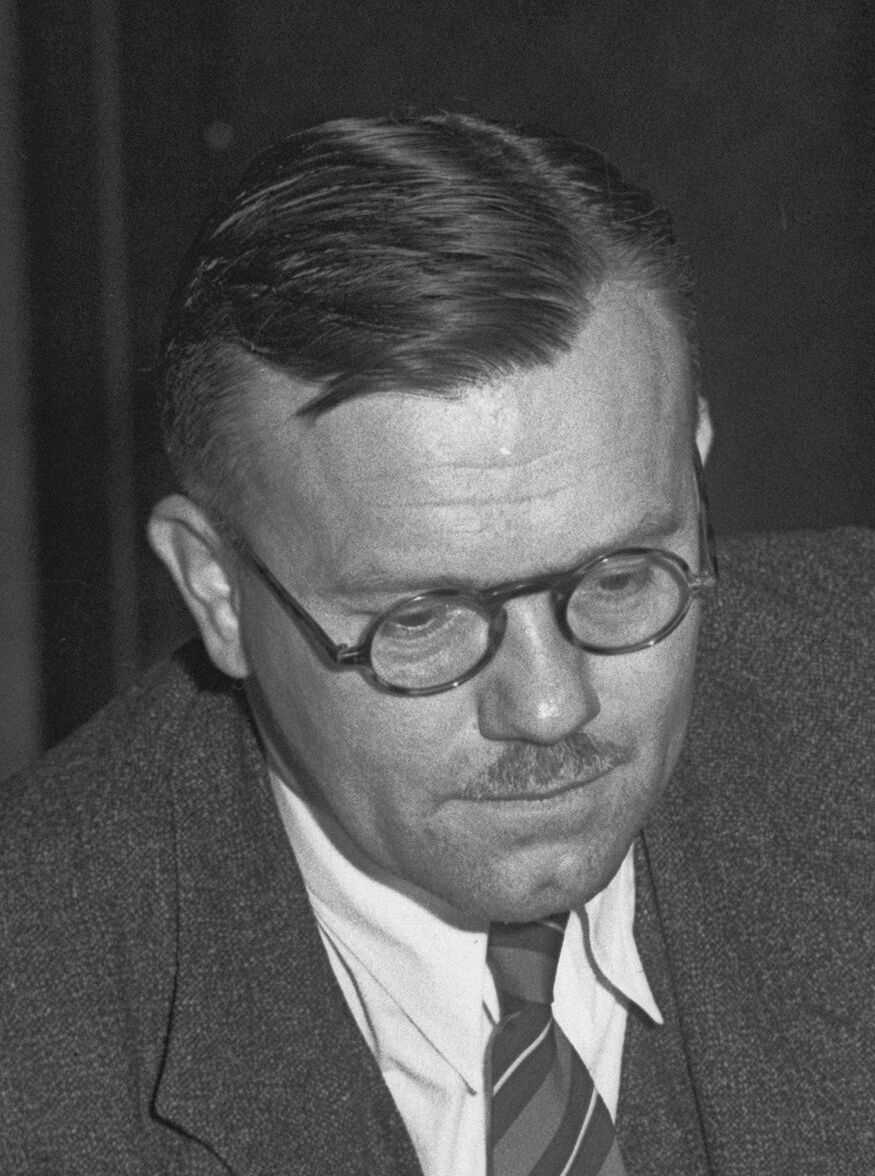
Hoye in 1935.

Daniel O. "Dan" Hoye served as Los Angeles City Controller from 1937 to 1961. On January 19, 1937, after the resignation of John S. Myers, Hoye was appointed by the Los Angeles City Council to replace him. He served until 1961, when he was defeated by Charles Navarro.

Political offices
Preceded by John S. Myers	Los Angeles City Controller; 1937–1961	Succeeded by Charles Navarro
