= Ira Reiner =

American lawyer (born 1936)

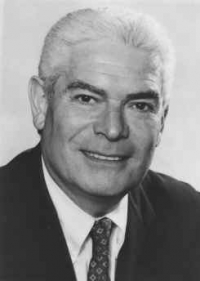

39th Los Angeles County District Attorney
- In office December 3, 1984 – December 7, 1992
- Preceded by: Robert Philibosian
- Succeeded by: Gil Garcetti

38th Los Angeles City Attorney
- In office July 1, 1981 – December 2, 1984
- Preceded by: Burt Pines
- Succeeded by: James Hahn

Los Angeles City Controller
- In office July 1, 1977 – June 30, 1981
- Preceded by: Charles Navarro
- Succeeded by: James Hahn

Personal details
- Born: Ira Kenneth Reiner; February 15, 1936 (age 90)
- Education: University of Southern California (BS); Southwestern Law School (JD)

Ira Kenneth Reiner (born February 15, 1936) is an American attorney and politician who served as the Los Angeles City Attorney from 1981 to 1984 and Los Angeles County District Attorney from 1984 to 1992. The McMartin preschool trial occurred during his tenure as DA.

== Education ==
Reiner earned a Bachelor of Science degree from the University of Southern California and a Juris Doctor from the Southwestern Law School in 1964.

== Career ==
From February 6 to July 17, 1970, Ira Reiner represented Leslie Van Houten in the Tate-LaBianca murder trials. He was dismissed, and replaced by Ronald Hughes.

He was the Los Angeles city controller from 1977 to 1981, and was the Los Angeles city attorney from 1981 to 1984, both times being succeeded by James Hahn. He was the Los Angeles County District Attorney from 1984 to 1992. As district attorney, he supervised the prosecution of several notorious cases, including the murder trial of Richard Ramírez, the widely publicized police arrest of Rodney King, and the McMartin preschool trial, the best known case of day care sex abuse hysteria.

In 1990, Reiner was an unsuccessful candidate for the Democratic nomination for California attorney general, losing to San Francisco District Attorney Arlo Smith, who in turn was defeated by Republican former Congressman Dan Lungren. In 1992, Reiner sought re-election as district attorney, but trailed Gil Garcetti in the June non-partisan primary. Initially Reiner stayed in the race, but in September he dropped out.

After retirement from office he entered private practice with the firm Riley and Reiner. He also served as a Fellow at the USC Center for the Political Future in 2022 and 2023.

== See also ==
- Bob Ronka, Los Angeles City Council member, 1977–81, candidate opposite Ira Reiner in 1981

Political offices
Preceded by Charles Navarro	City Controller of Los Angeles, California; 1977–1981	Succeeded by James Hahn
Legal offices
Preceded by Burt Pines	City Attorney of Los Angeles, California; 1981–1984	Succeeded by James Hahn
Preceded by Robert Philibosian	Los Angeles County District Attorney; 1984–1992	Succeeded by Gil Garcetti
