= Job Harriman =

American socialist (1861–1925)

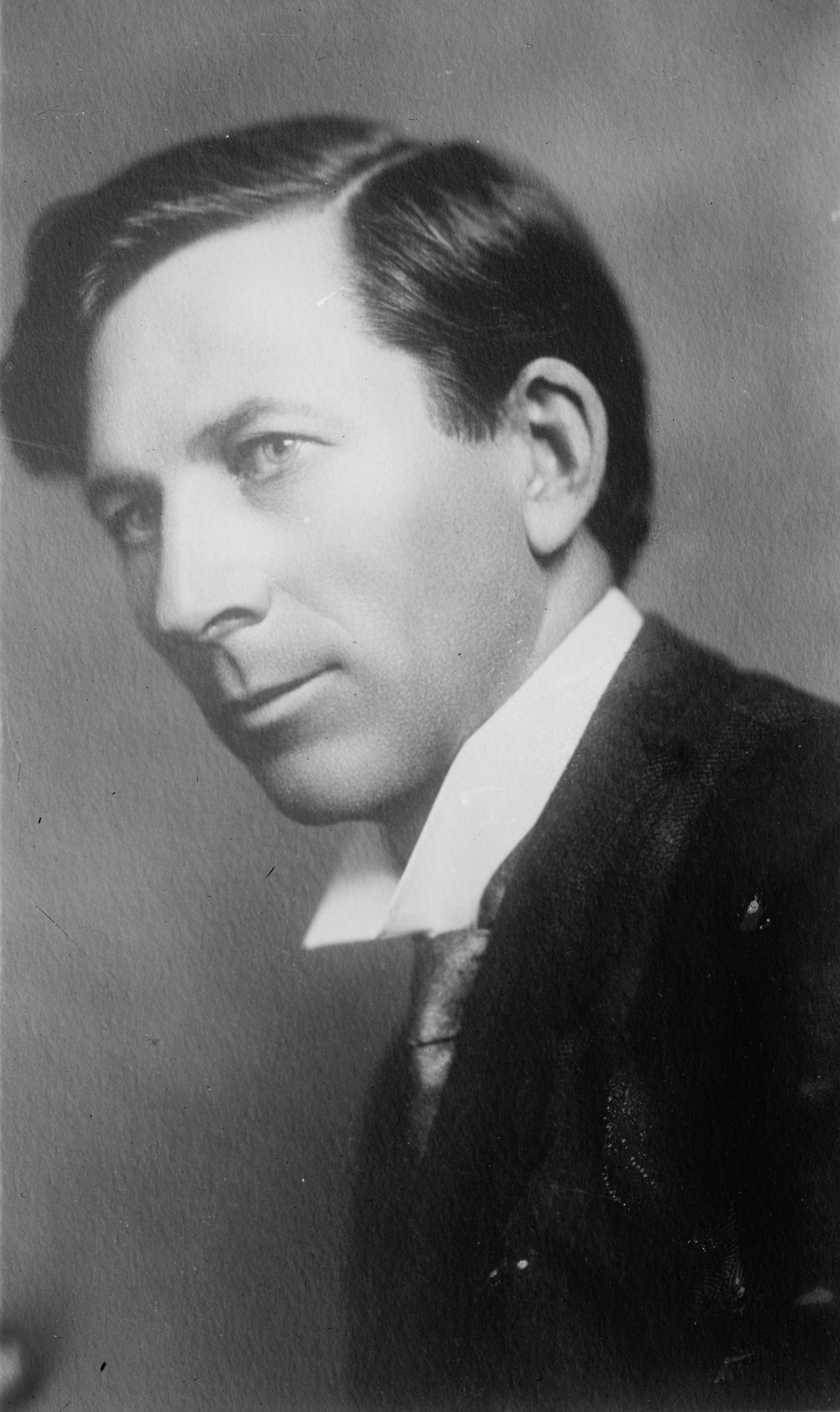
- Harriman c. 1900
- Born: January 15, 1861; Frankfort, Clinton County, Indiana, U.S.
- Died: October 26, 1925 (aged 64); Sierra Madre, Los Angeles County, California, U.S.
- Occupation: Politician
- Spouse: Mary Theodosia Gray
- Children: Gray Chenoweth Harriman

Job Harriman (January 15, 1861 – October 26, 1925) was an American minister who later became an agnostic and a socialist. In 1900, he ran for vice president of the United States along with Eugene Debs on the ticket of the Socialist Party of America. He later twice ran for mayor of Los Angeles, drawing considerable attention and support. He also founded a socialist utopian community called Llano del Rio in California, later relocated to Louisiana.

== Early years ==
Harriman was born on January 15, 1861, in Frankfort, Clinton County, Indiana. He lived on the family farm until he was 18.

Harriman's early life was filled with religious influences by his parents. After graduating from Butler University in 1884, he went on into the ministry. He gradually came to doubt the ability of the church to fundamentally affect the lives of common people and to see organized religion as a trap. He recalled in 1902:

It is in doubt and not in faith that the salvation of the world is to be found. Faith is a delusion and a snare: a pitfall, a prison. It intimidates the intellect. With fear of eternal damnation religion crushes intellectual activity; with hero worship it destroys individuality; with hopes for the beyond it prevents the growth of ideals for the present. It makes of us a race of intellectual cowards; it changes but little if any our daily conduct toward each other. But doubt sets us free.

As Harriman moved away from a belief in spirituality and towards philosophical materialism, he came into contact with socialist literature, being particularly impressed with the 1886 utopian novel, Looking Backwards, by Edward Bellamy. In 1886, he moved to San Francisco and where he established a local Nationalist Club, dedicated to attempting to put Bellamy's ideas into practice in America.

Later, Harriman came into contact with the writings of Karl Marx, which turned his early Christian socialist inclinations towards Marxism.

Harriman married the sister of a college roommate, Mary Theodosia Gray. In 1895, the couple had twins, a girl and a boy, with the girl dying as a young child.

Harriman left the church and took up the study of law, becoming a lawyer and establishing his own law firm.

== Political career ==
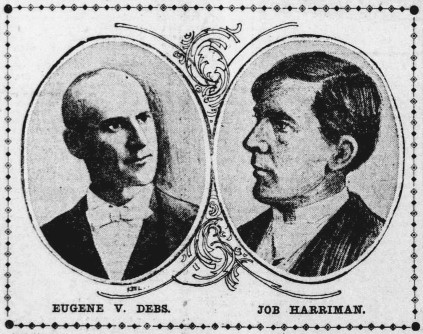
The 1900 Social Democratic Party of America ticket for President and Vice President of the United States with Eugene V. Debs and Job Harriman portraits

Harriman was initially a member of the Democratic Party but, as he became conscious of socialist ideas, he left that organization and joined the Socialist Labor Party (SLP). He was a gubernatorial candidate for California on the SLP ticket in 1898.

Harriman broke with the SLP during the acrimonious split of 1899, which was largely linked to the SLP's insistence on establishing competing socialist dual unions with the existing trade unions affiliated with the American Federation of Labor. Harriman thereafter was affiliated with the East Coast-based variant of the Social Democratic Party of America (SDP), a group whose members included Henry Slobodin and Morris Hillquit.

In 1900 during unity negotiations between the Eastern and Midwestern SDP organizations, Harriman ran for vice presidency of the United States on the Social Democratic Party of America ticket along with presidential candidate Eugene V. Debs.

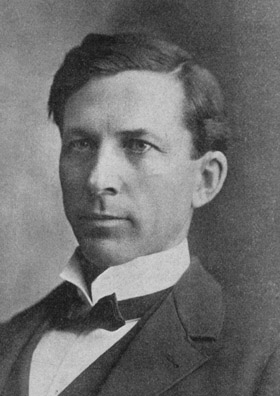
Harriman c. 1902

Harriman twice ran for mayor of Los Angeles on the Socialist ticket during the 1910s. In the 1911 primary, he came in first with 44% of the vote. Harriman was one of the lawyers for the McNamara Brothers, along with Clarence Darrow. He was unaware of their guilt, and thus was taken by surprise by a plea bargain negotiated by Darrow, which, unfortunately for Harriman, was announced after the primary but before the general election. His association with the widely reviled McNamaras proved fatal to his campaign and George Alexander won the election. He ran again in 1913, earning 26% of the vote in the primary.

== Llano Cooperative Colony ==
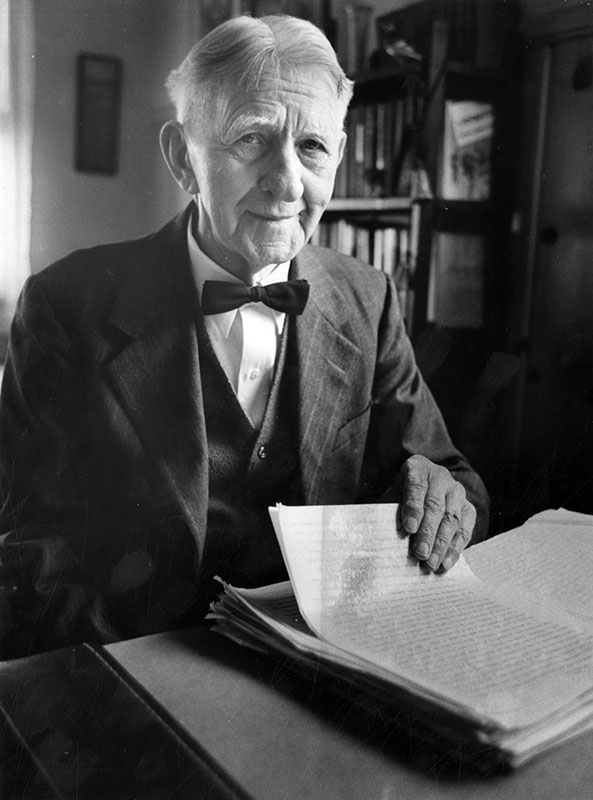
Harriman later in life

Following the narrow defeat in his second bid for mayor of Los Angeles, Harriman turned his back on electoral politics. He instead sought to establish a self-sufficient community upon socialist principles. Together with a group of like-minded investors, he purchased a 2,000-acre (8.1 km^{2}) parcel of land in Antelope Valley in California, which the group named Llano del Rio. The land included water rights — a critical factor due to the location of the land in an oasis in the Mojave Desert.

Advertisements were taken in the socialist press and shares sold to interested families for $500 cash. In addition, each family was asked to contribute a minimum of $2,000 in personal property to a "common storehouse" established for the benefit of the entire community.

Beginning with just five families, by 1914 the Llano community had grown to over 1,000 people. Tents were replaced by adobe buildings and various enterprises, such as a sawmill, kiln, cannery and bakery, were established. The group issued its own monthly magazine, The Western Comrade (later changing its name to The Llano Colonist) with Harriman acting as editor.

Local farmers began to complain that the socialist community was consuming more than its fair share of precious water, resulting in a stream of lawsuits over the issue. Worse yet, the community proved incapable of advancing beyond a very basic economic level, causing discontent among its members. A new location was found in Leesville, Louisiana, in 1918, but the new environs did not suit Harriman and he soon returned home to Los Angeles. The Llano community survived in difficult conditions into the 1930s.

== Death and legacy ==
Harriman died on October 26, 1925, in Sierra Madre, Los Angeles County, California. He was survived by his wife, Mary Theodosia Gray, and his son Gray Chenoweth Harriman.

== Works ==
- Single-tax vs. Socialism: Debate between James G. Maguire and Job Harriman, June 16, 1895. With James G. Maguire. San Francisco: American Section, Socialist Labor Party, 1895.
- The Class War in Idaho: The Horrors of the Bull Pen: An Indictment of Combined Capital in Conspiracy with President McKinley, General Merriam and Governor Steunenberg, for their Crimes against the Miners of the Coeur d'Alenes. New York: Volks-Zeitung Library, vol. 2, no. 4 (July 1, 1900).
- The Socialist Trade and Labor Alliance Versus the "Pure and Simple" Trade Union: A Debate Held at the Grand Opera House, New Haven, Conn., November 25, 1900, between Daniel De Leon Representing the Socialist Trade and Labor Alliance and the Socialist Labor Party, and Job Harriman Representing the "Pure and Simple" Trade Union and the Social Democratic Party. Stenographically Reported by B. F. Keinard. New York City: New York Labor News Co., 1900.
- The Socialist Party and the Trade Unions, Los Angeles: Los Angeles Socialist, 1902.
- Lewis-Harriman Debate: Socialist Party vs. Union Labor Party: Simpson Auditorium, Los Angeles, California. With Arthur M. Lewis. Los Angeles: Common Sense Pub. Co., n.d. [1906].
- The Western Comrade (editor). Los Angeles, CA, and Leesville, LA: 1913–1918. Vols. 1-2 | Vols. 3-4 | Vol. 5 Owned by Harriman from June 1914 (vol. 2, no. 2).

== See also ==
- 1910 Los Angeles Times bombing
