= Joe E. Hollingsworth =

American politician

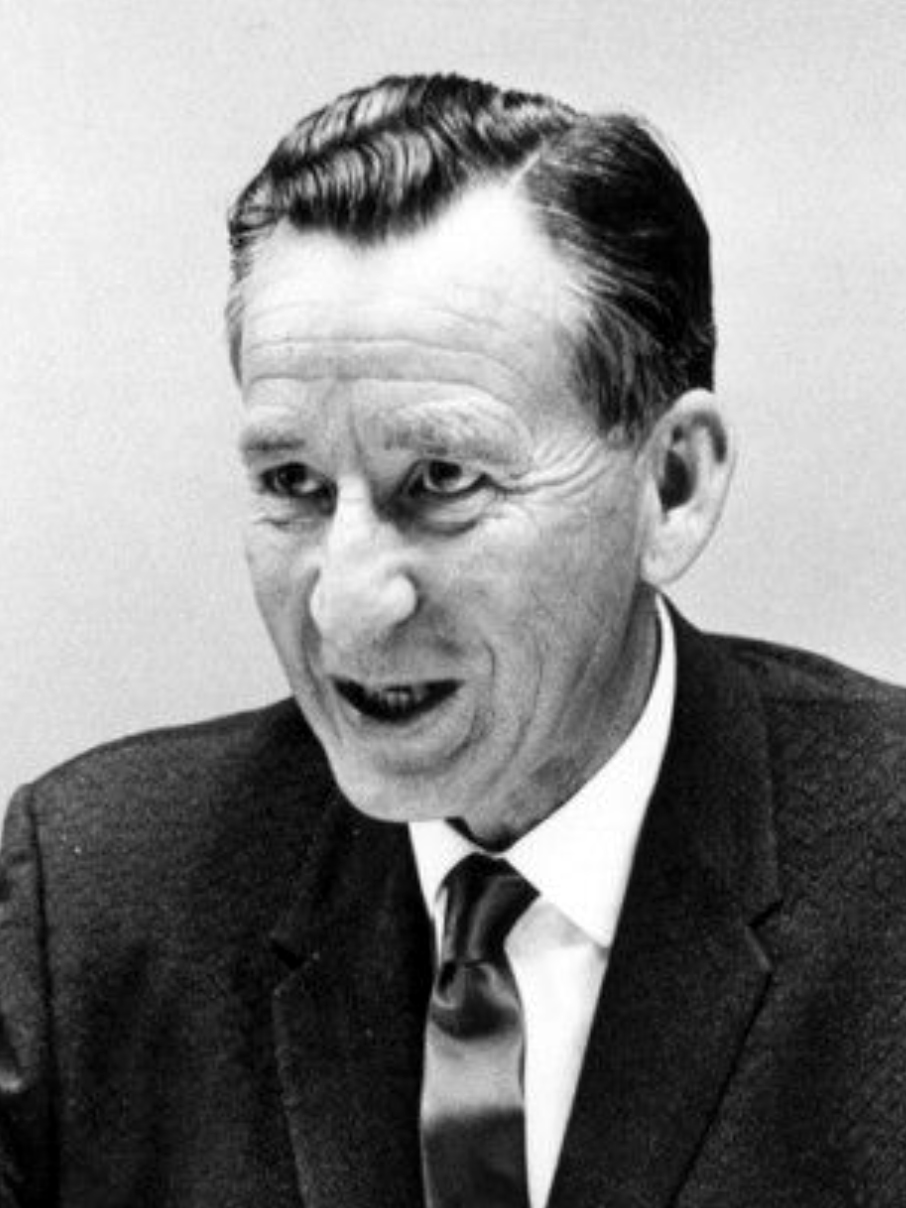
- Hollingsworth in 1961

Member of the Los Angeles City Council for the 10th district
- In office August 25, 1961 – April 2, 1963
- Preceded by: Charles Navarro
- Succeeded by: Tom Bradley

Personal details
- Born: August 25, 1908; Los Angeles, California
- Died: November 12, 1975 (aged 67)
- Political party: Republican

Joseph E. Hollingsworth (August 25, 1908 – November 12, 1975) was an American politician was appointed in 1961 to replace Charles Navarro as Los Angeles City Council member for the racially mixed 10th district. He served for two years until he was ousted by retired policeman and future mayor Tom Bradley. He was the last Caucasian council member from that district.

== Biography ==
Hollingsworth, born on August 25, 1908, was the son of Anna Hollingsworth Bostic, who immigrated from Germany. A native of Los Angeles, he lived with his family at 5483 Village Green and was "active in youth work"; in 1961 he was a construction supervisor for the Baldwin Hills Company, developer of Baldwin Hills Estates. His wife was Alice and his children were Joe Jr. and Alison. In 1969 he was named a vice president of Los Angeles Federal Savings. He was a veteran of World War II and co-founded Baldwin Hills Post 706 of the American Legion. He co-founded the Southern California Pop Warner Football Federation.

Hollingsworth died November 12, 1975; funeral services were held in Inglewood on November 15.

== Political career ==
In June 1961 Hollingsworth and 10 other people applied for the 10th District councilmanic position left vacant by the election of the incumbent, Charles Navarro, as city controller. Eventually there were more than 30 candidates. Although Mayor Sam Yorty had favored appointment of a Negro in the district, a council committee unanimously recommended 52-year-old Hollingsworth, a Caucasian, and the City Council followed suit on August 25, 1961, by a vote of 8 to 6, "after a stormy 2-1/2-hour council session."

One of his first acts was to appoint Cage S. Johnson, 49, a "restaurant service supervisor and part-time television actor," as the "first Negro to serve as field secretary to a City Council member," but nevertheless a recall drive was organized at a community meeting, with H. H. Brookins named as chair. Brookins said that 16 applicants for city councilman were Negroes and that the council, by appointing Hollingsworth, "had dealt the Negro community a fast shuffle." The recall petitions were rejected by a court "because they failed to list the voter registration number and the date of registration of the persons who circulated them."

At the next election, in April 1963, there were only two candidates, Hollingsworth and Tom Bradley, and also two elections — one for the unexpired term left by Controller Navarro, ending June 30, and one for a full four-year term starting July 1. Bradley won by 17,760 votes to 10,540 in the first election and by 17,552 votes to 10,400 in the second. Hollingsworth's last day in office was April 12, 1963. He was the last Caucasian council member from the 10th District.

Preceded by Charles Navarro	Los Angeles City Council; 10th District; 1961–1963	Succeeded by Tom Bradley
