= William Miller Bowen =

American politician

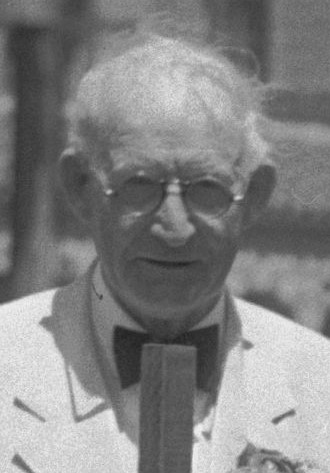
- Bowen in 1932

Member of the Los Angeles City Council from the 5th ward
- In office December 12, 1900 – December 8, 1904
- Preceded by: Charles Hulbert Toll
- Succeeded by: George A. Smith

Personal details
- Born: January 16, 1862 Lowell, Indiana
- Died: December 22, 1937 (aged 45) Los Angeles, California
- Party: Republican
- Occupation: Lawyer and civic leader

William Miller Bowen (January 16, 1862 – December 22, 1937) was an American lawyer and civic leader in Los Angeles. He was a member of the Los Angeles City Council is known as the "Father of Exposition Park."

== Biography ==
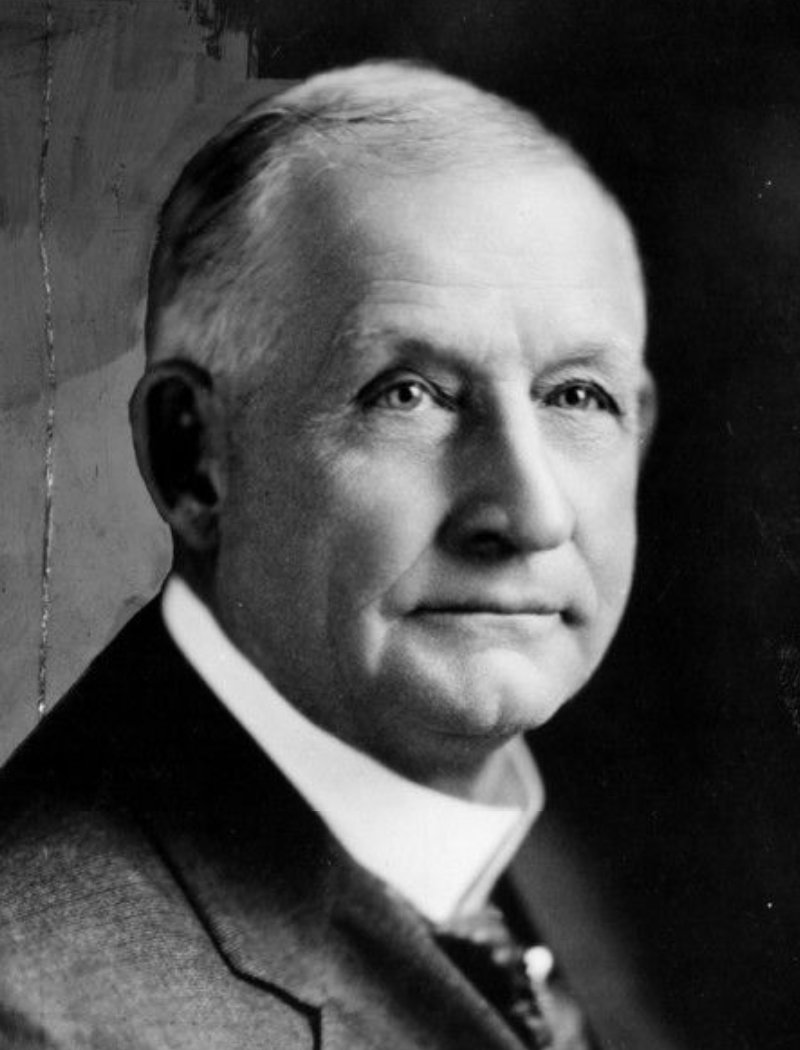
Bowen in 1902 as a City Councilman.

Bowen was born on a farm in Lowell, Indiana during the American Civil War. He graduated from Drake University in Des Moines, Iowa in 1894 and was admitted to the bar in both Iowa and California that year. He also farmed in Oklahoma before moving to California.

Bowen was a member of the City Council in 1900-04, and as acting mayor in 1904 he vetoed a council resolution that would have placed a bond issue of $250,000 to build a new city library in Central Park, today's Pershing Square. The library was later built on the site of the Los Angeles State Normal School on Fifth Street.

Almost from the time he landed here he became interested in the tract which he afterward dedicated as Exposition Park. At that early day the place was known as Agricultural Park. . . . On it were a race track, a rabbit chasing course, a clubhouse and two saloons which formed a hangout for race-track touts and gamblers.

One day he found some of his Sunday-school pupils visiting the race track and rabbit course, and that impelled him to help organize a Society for the Prevention of Cruelty to Animals, and he "fostered measures which outlawed gambling in the community and ended coursing and racing" in the park.

In the 1910s, he was active in keeping the land on which Exposition Park is now built from being developed by private interests, arguing successfully in state courts for public ownership. He was a member of the park's Board of Governors, resigning in 1936. A bronze tablet was dedicated in his honor in the State Building within the park, and an oak tree was given his name.

In 1914 he was chairman of the Los Angeles Republican Central Committee.

In December 1918, as park commissioner, he made a proposal on behalf of Mayor Frederic T. Woodman that a "gigantic monument," 250 feet high, be erected in Exposition Park in honor of military and naval troops who had fought in the World War just ended and that it be surmounted by a "victory" figure, nine feet high, to rest on a bronze ball four feet in diameter. Access would be provided by a passenger elevator.

He was the attorney for and a member of the Board of Regents of the University of California.

== Death ==
Bowen died at his home on December 22, 1937, "the victim of choking on a fruit loop which followed a paralytic stroke." He was survived by his wife, Louise, and a daughter, Mrs. Mary Lorenzen.
