= Elijah E. Unger =

American official (1857–1903)

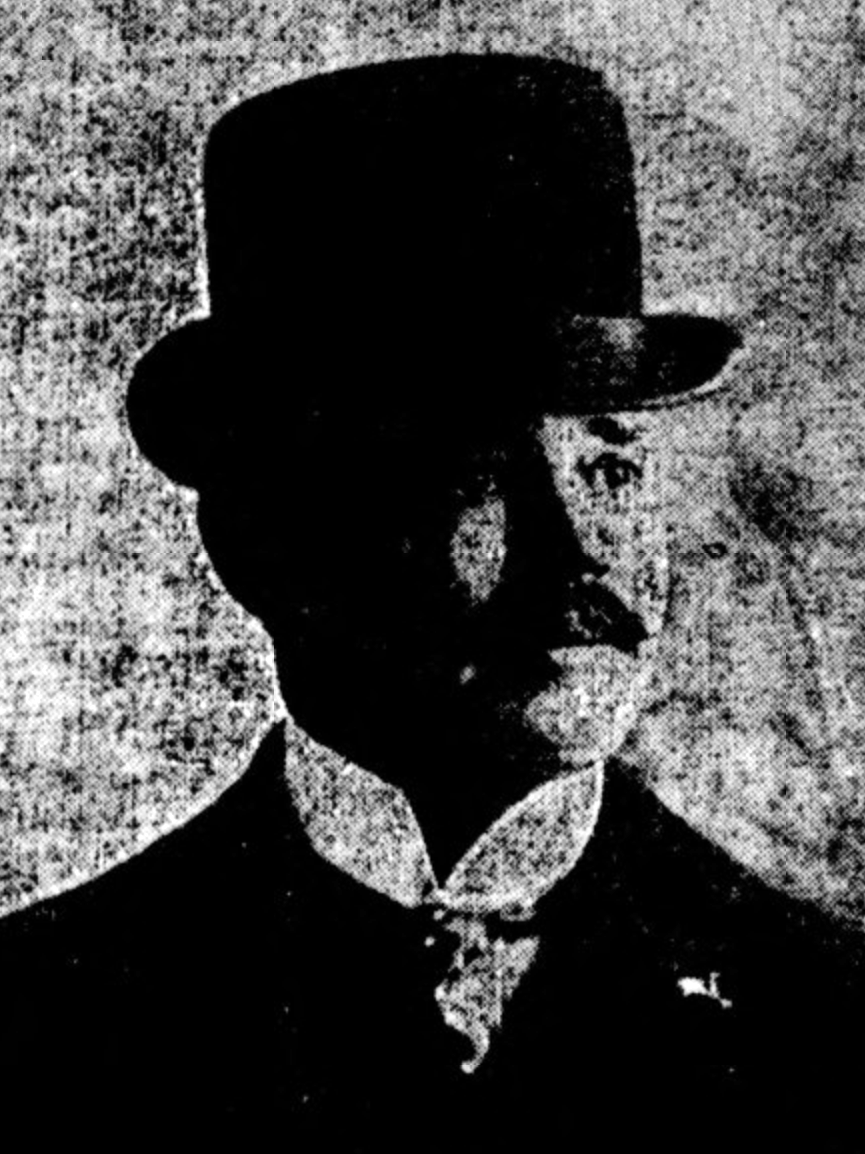
Unger in 1903.

Elijah E. Unger (August 1857 – October 17, 1903) served as Los Angeles City Auditor from 1900 until his death on October 17, 1903.

Preceded by E. A. Carson	Los Angeles City Auditor; 1900—1903	Succeeded by Lewis H. Schwaebe
