= Los Angeles City Controller =

Elected official of Los Angeles who acts as the city's chief accounting officer

- Seal of Los Angeles

- Flag of Los Angeles

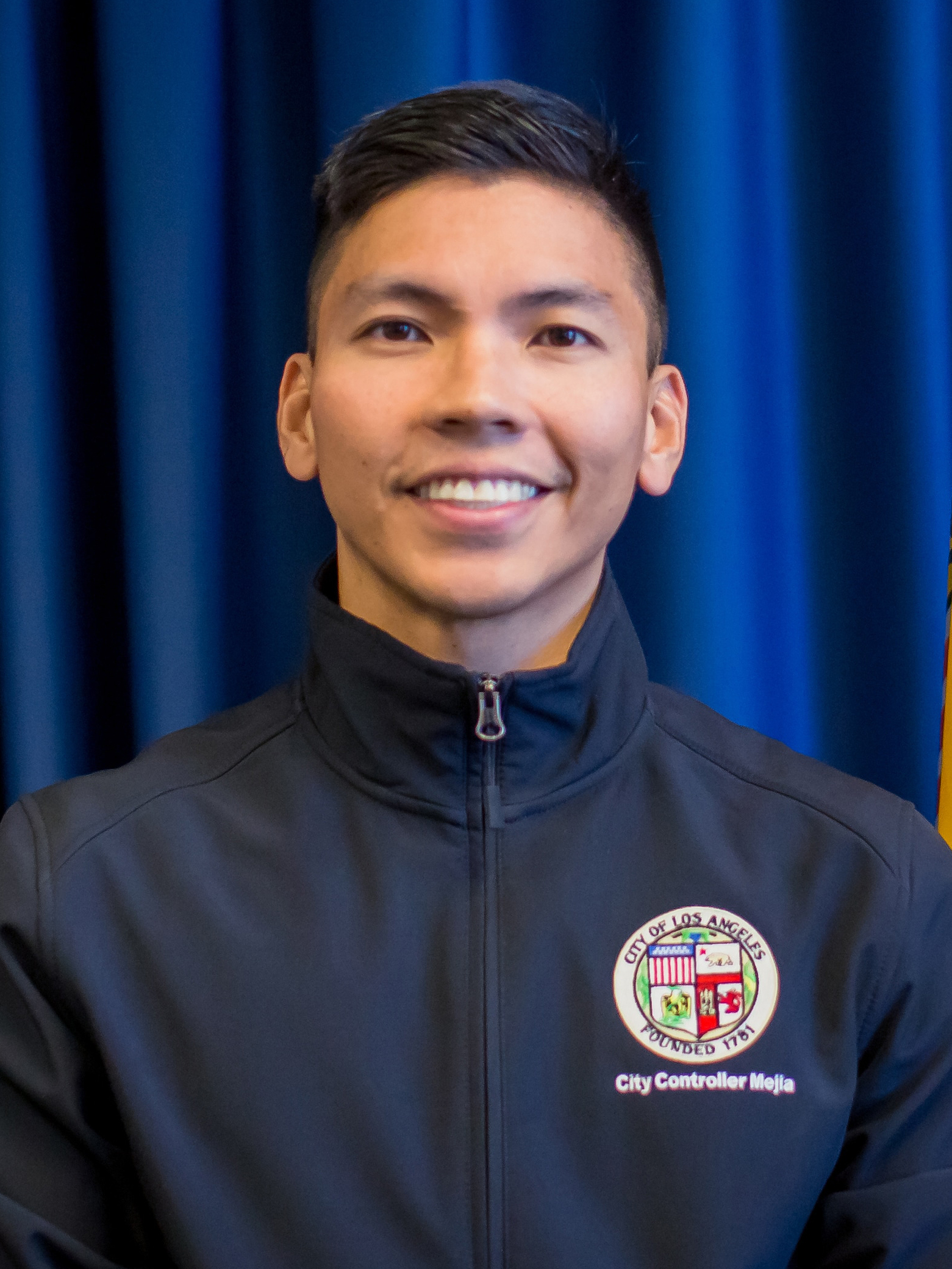
- Incumbent; Kenneth Mejia since December 12, 2022
- Type: Comptroller
- Term length: 4 years (renewable once)
- Website: controller.lacity.gov

The Los Angeles city controller is an official in the government of the city of Los Angeles, California. The city controller is the paymaster and chief accounting officer of the city. Along with the mayor and the city attorney, the city controller is chosen by popular vote every four years.

The position began in 1878 as the Los Angeles city auditor. In the early days, the job included secretarial duties for the Los Angeles Common Council. Upon the re-election of John S. Myers in 1925, when the city approved a new charter, the name of the position was changed to city controller. In 2000, another update to the city charter added the power and responsibility of conducting "performance audits" of departmental effectiveness.

== List of city controllers ==
City Auditor (1879–1925)

No.	Photo	Officeholder	Tenure start	Tenure end
1		William W. Robinson	December 5, 1879	December 13, 1886
2		Freeman G. Teed	December 13, 1886	December 10, 1888
3		M. F. Stiles	December 10, 1888	February 21, 1889
4		Frank E. Lopez	February 25, 1889	December 12, 1892
5		Fred H. Teale	December 12, 1892	December 16, 1896
6		Thomas E. Nicols	December 16, 1896	December 15, 1898
7		E. A. Carson	December 15, 1898	December 12, 1900
8		Elijah E. Unger	December 12, 1900	October 17, 1903
9		Lewis H. Schwaebe	October 19, 1903	December 13, 1906
10		William C. Mushet	December 13, 1906	December 10, 1909
11		John S. Myers	December 10, 1909	June 30, 1935

City Controller (1925–present)

No.	Photo	Officeholder	Tenure start	Tenure end
11		John S. Myers	June 30, 1935	January 19, 1937
12		Dan O. Hoye	January 19, 1937	June 30, 1961
13		Charles Navarro	July 1, 1961	June 30, 1977
14		Ira Reiner	July 1, 1977	June 30, 1981
15		James Hahn	July 1, 1981	June 30, 1985
16		Rick Tuttle	July 1, 1985	June 30, 2001
17		Laura N. Chick	July 1, 2001	June 30, 2009
18		Wendy Greuel	July 1, 2009	June 30, 2013
19		Ron Galperin	July 1, 2013	December 9, 2022
20		Kenneth Mejia	December 12, 2022	Incumbent
