= Anton Johannsen =

German-American anarchist

- Born: 29 April 1872; Nordstrand, Province of Schleswig-Holstein, German Empire
- Died: Chicago, Illinois, U.S.
- Occupation: Labor leader
- Known for: Indicted for Los Angeles Times bombing; Vice-President of the Chicago Federation of Labor

Anton Johannsen (April 29, 1872 – ?) was a North Frisian-born carpenter, anarchist, and labor activist who was indicted for the Los Angeles Times bombing.

In 1933, he was appointed by a Democratic governor to the States' Industrial Commission, and in 1935 received his highest status serving as Vice President of the Chicago Federation of Labor.
