= John S. Myers =

City Auditor and Controller of Los Angeles (died 1946)

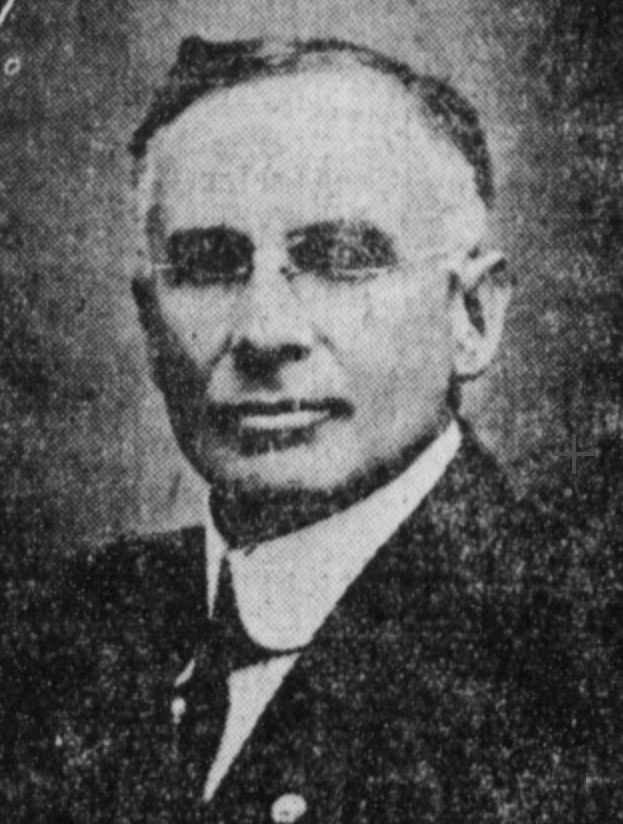
Myers in 1909

John S. Myers (died December 26, 1946) was an American politician who served as Los Angeles City Auditor and Los Angeles City Controller for a total of 28 years.

Meyers served as Auditor of the City of Los Angeles longer than anyone else. He succeeded William C. Mushet in 1909 and held the title of Auditor until it was changed to Controller in 1925 under the new city charter. He served in that capacity until he resigned on January 19, 1937.

== Biography ==
John S. Myers was born in Indiana.

On December 7, 1909, Myers was first elected to serve as City Auditor of Los Angeles, California. He served eight two-year terms in the role. In 1925, the position was changed to that of Los Angeles City Controller following the inception of a new charter: Myers was reelected and served three four-year terms. He retired on January 19, 1937.

Myers had a son, Lindley S. Myers. He died on December 26, 1946.

| Preceded by William C. Mushet | Los Angeles City Auditor; 1909–1925 | Succeeded by — |
| Preceded by — | Los Angeles City Controller; 1925–1937 | Succeeded by Daniel O. Hoye |
