= Hans Johannsen =

German chief engineer on a U-boat in World War II

- Born: 29 January 1913; Stadum, Nordfriesland
- Died: 5 March 1961 (aged 48); Burg on Fehmarn
- Military career
- Allegiance: Nazi Germany
- Branch: Kriegsmarine
- Service years: 1935–45
- Rank: Oberleutnant (Ing.)
- Units: U-6, U-3, U-5, U-96, U-802
- Conflicts: World War II
- Awards: Knight's Cross of the Iron Cross

Hans Johannsen (29 January 1913 – 5 March 1961) was a German chief engineer on a U-boat in World War II and recipient of the Knight's Cross of the Iron Cross.

== Awards ==
- Wehrmacht Long Service Award 4th Class (1 January 1939)
- Iron Cross (1939) 2nd Class (20 April 1940) & 1st Class (2 March 1941)
- U-boat War Badge (1939) (3 January 1941)
- German Cross in Gold on 17 November 1942 as Leutnant (Ing.) on U-96 in the 7. Unterseebootflottille
- U-Boat Front Clasp in Bronze (13 November 1944)
- Knight's Cross of the Iron Cross on 31 March 1945 as Oberleutnant (Ing.) and chief engineer on U-802
