= Oscar Eugene Farish =

American politician

Oscar Eugene Farish (1868–1917) was an oil man and businessman in Los Angeles, California, at the turn of the 19th and 20th centuries. He was a member of the Los Angeles City Council.

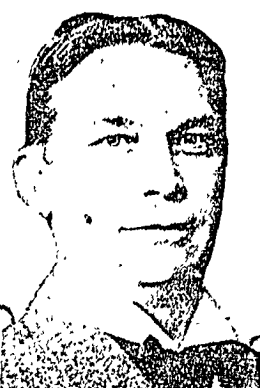
Oscar Eugene Farish

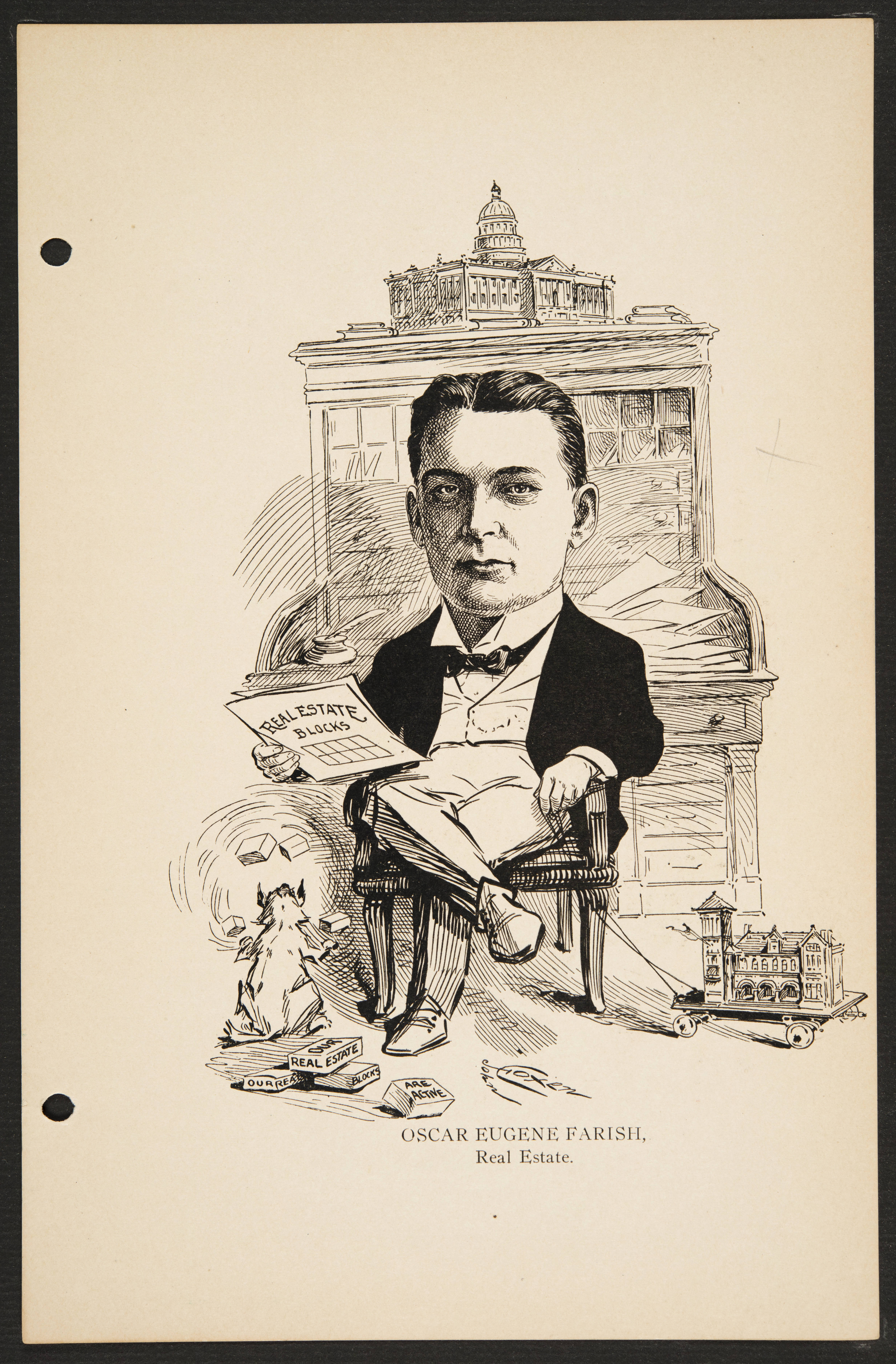
Farish as depicted in Southern Californians "as we see 'em": a volume of cartoons and caricatures of Los Angeles citizens

== Personal ==
Farish was born on July 20, 1868, near Pittsboro, North Carolina, in Chatham County, the son of John W. and Mary Farish. The family moved to Arkansas when Oscar was young. He was married on December 4, 1895, in Pasadena, California, to Alice Aspinall Grinrod of Albany, New York, and they had two daughters, Muriel Estelle (Mrs. Frank Boswell) and Gwendolyn. The family moved to California in 1895, and they lived on West Adams Boulevard in Jefferson Park.

He was a member of the City Club, the California Club, Federation Club, Knights of Pythias, Independent Order of Foresters and the Masonic Lodge. He was a Protestant and a Democrat.

Farish's wife died in 1913. Farish died on December 17, 1917, in Los Angeles after six months' of failing health. He was survived by two daughters, Mrs. Frank Boswell of San Francisco, and Gwendolyn, age 14, who lived with her father at 730 Westlake Avenue. Interment was in Inglewood Cemetery.

== Avocation ==
At the age of nineteen he began work for the Southern Pacific Railroad. After moving to Los Angeles, he was employed by the Blake, Moffitt & Towne wholesale paper company and then was cashier for the Los Angeles Electric Company. In 1897 he entered the oil and real-estate business with W.W. Mines as his partner. In April 1912 he organized the California Realty Corporation.

== Politics ==
Farish was elected to the City Council in 1903 and served for two years. He introduced the idea of the municipal consolidation of the cities of Wilmington and San Pedro with the city of Los Angeles a way to form a harbor for L.A. He also supported the digging of the Broadway Tunnel and was in favor of a railroad terminal at the Los Angeles Plaza.
