= George A. Smith (California politician) =

American politician (1844–1916

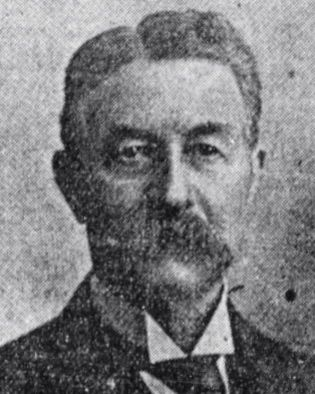
- Smith in 1909

Member of the Los Angeles City Council from the 5th ward
- In office December 8, 1904 – December 13, 1906
- Preceded by: Charles Hulbert Toll
- Succeeded by: William Miller Bowen

Personal details
- Born: November 26, 1844 Sidney, Ontario, Canada
- Died: August 1, 1916 (aged 71) Arlington Heights, Los Angeles
- Party: Republican

George A. Smith (November 26, 1844 – August 1, 1916) was a pioneer resident of Los Angeles, California, a member of its City Council and an unsuccessful candidate for mayor, as well as a Nevada mining speculator.

== Personal ==
Smith was born in Sidney, Ontario, Canada on November 26, 1844, and was married to Harriett Merriman in Colburn, Ontario, on June 11, 1871. They resettled from Trenton, Ontario, to Los Angeles in 1873. Smith died of a heart ailment on August 1, 1916, in his home at 1521 Fifth Avenue in the Arlington Heights neighborhood. He was survived by his widow and three children, Arthur M. Smith, Mrs. W.S. Wilson of Los Angeles and Mrs. A.B. Young of Victorville. Interment was at Rosedale Cemetery.

== Vocation ==
Smith began working as a clerk in a general store near his home in Canada, rising to the position of manager, then going into partnership with his brother. After arriving in Los Angeles, Smith began clerking in a small dry-goods store on North Main Street, A year later he bought a 160-acre (65 ha) ranch in Vernon, California, where he planted orange trees. He entered into the real-estate business in 1887. Smith was engaged in the real estate business in Los Angeles as a member of the Nolan & Smith Company. He retired in 1896. He also had mining interests in Nevada, principally around the Goldfield area, in partnership with Emerson Gee. He had claims also in the Ladd Mountain in Bullfrog, Nevada. Smith was the "chief owner of the biggest antimony deposits" in the United States.

== Municipal government ==
A Republican, Smith was elected to the City Council in 1908 and served one term. While on the council he was instrumental in securing the passage of an ordinance requiring applicants for a saloon license to get the consent of nearby property owners. He was opposed to the idea of civil service in municipal government, telling a reporter that

Men won't work as hard when they know their jobs are secure as when they are likely to be discharged ... Oh, I know that the applicants have to pass some sort of examination, but that ... only proves they are best in that examination ... Men don't do a good day's work under civil service. They know their positions are secure, and they loaf.

At the City Hall, where he was chair of the council's finance committee, he was informally known as "Uncle George." Smith was a witness in a suit brought by employees of a failed newspaper, the Los Angeles Press, testifying that he had given $275 to Winfield Scott, the manager of the newspaper, to "tide the paper over" and that he "had no assurance of [political] support from him." In December 1909 Smith, a Republican, ran against George Alexander, another Republican, for mayor. Alexander won by a vote of 20,291 to 16,964.
