= 1909 Los Angeles mayoral special election =

- March 26, 1909
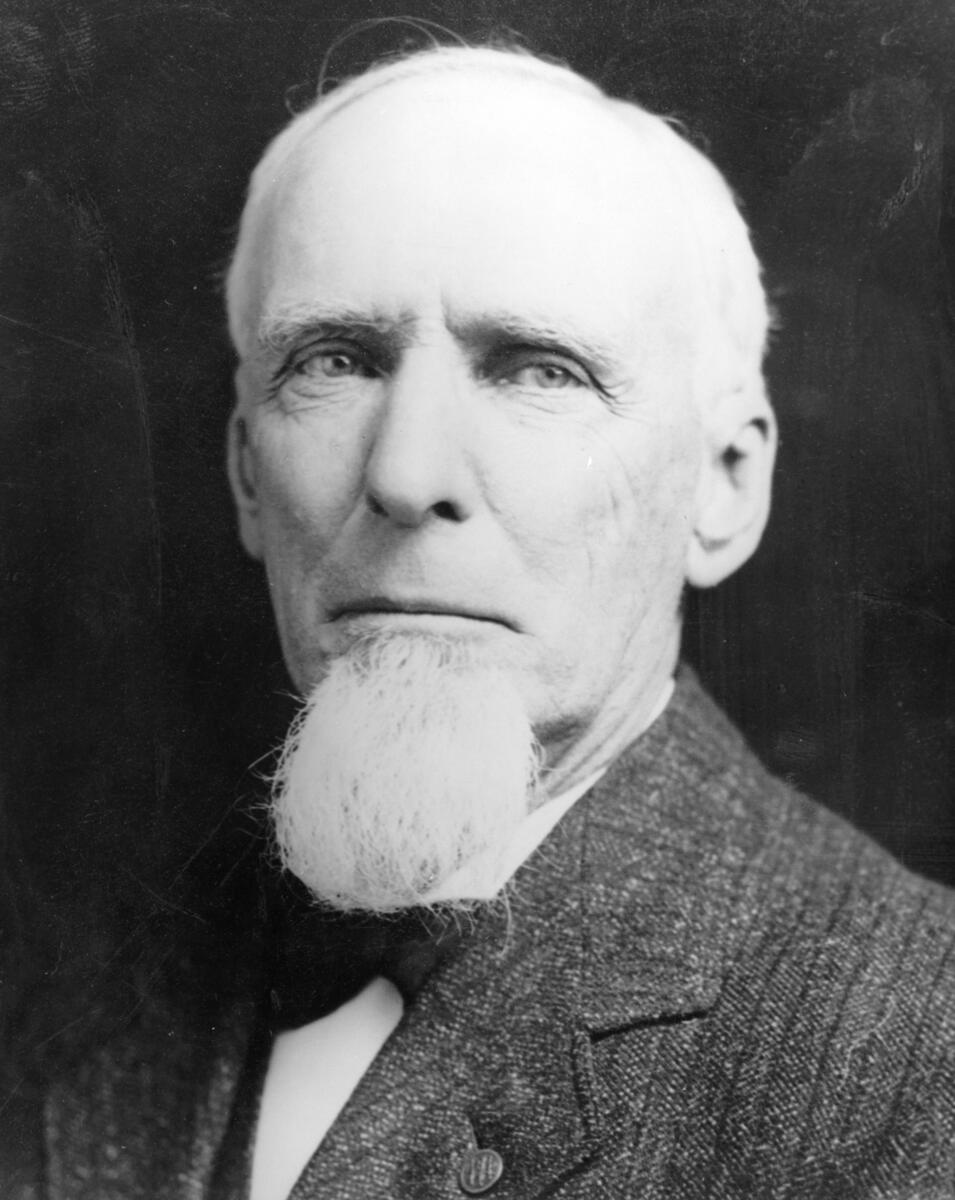

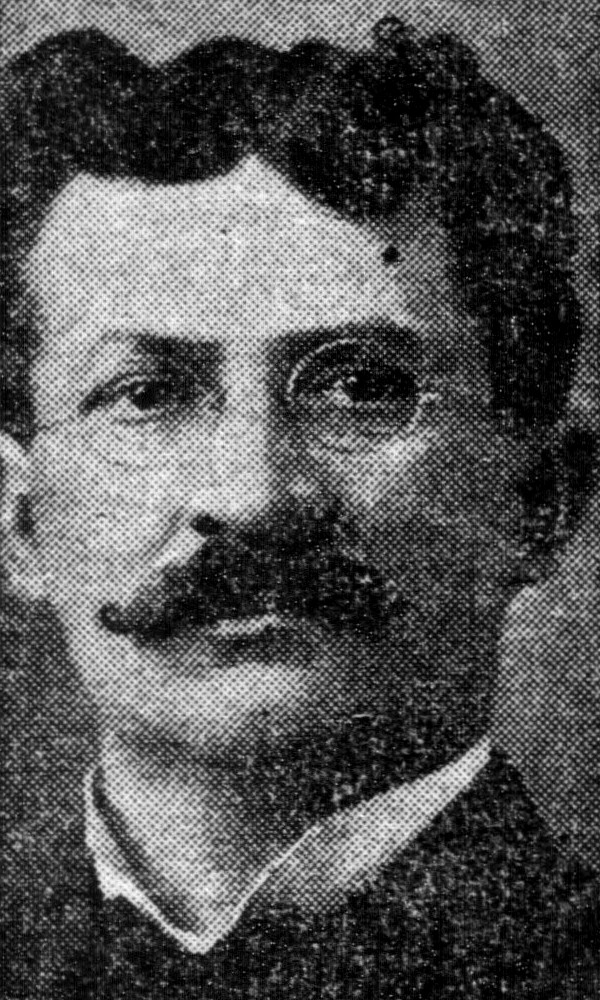
Candidate	George Alexander	Fred C. Wheeler
Popular vote	14,043	12,341
Percentage	53.23%	46.77%
Mayor before election
William D. Stephens
Elected Mayor
George Alexander

The 1909 Los Angeles mayoral special election took place on March 26, 1909, following the recall attempt of incumbent Arthur Cyprian Harper. George Alexander was elected over Fred C. Wheeler by a small plurality. It was the first election "ever held in any American city for the recall of a mayor." It was also the first election held after the charter amendment that instituted nonpartisan elections and made the office of Mayor nonpartisan.

== Background ==
Facing a recall election, incumbent Democratic mayor Arthur Cyprian Harper was forced to resign due to dishonesty that marked his administration. Because of his resignation, Republican politician William Stephens, who had been picked as Harper's opponent, was named acting mayor of Los Angeles while campaigning was going on, which lasted less than two weeks.

Two candidates participated, Republican candidate George Alexander and Socialist politician Fred C. Wheeler. Wheeler had been denied ballot access because his candidacy had allegedly not followed regulations of the city before the ruling was overturned by a judicial appeal.

Wheeler lost to George Alexander by a small plurality of 1,650 votes, with the Associated Press reporting that the vote for Wheeler was a "great surprise". Alexander filled the unexpired term of Harper, which lasted until November 1909.

== Results ==
Los Angeles mayoral recall election, March 26, 1909
Candidate	Votes	%
George Alexander	14,043	53.23
Fred C. Wheeler	12,341	46.78
Total votes	26,384	100.00
