= George Alexander (American politician) =

American politician (1839–1923)

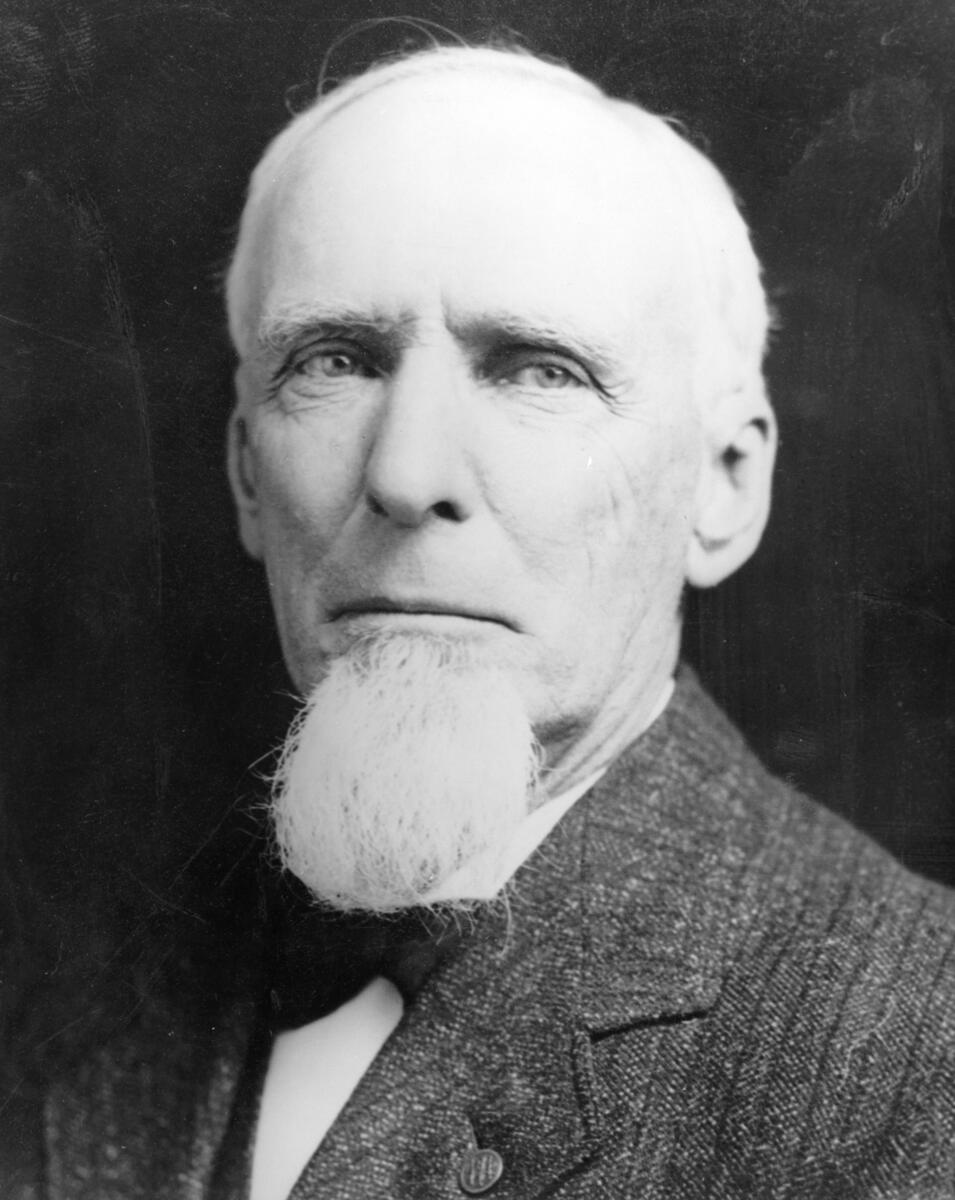
- Mayor George Alexander in office

28th Mayor of Los Angeles
- In office March 26, 1909 – July 1, 1913
- Preceded by: William Stephens
- Succeeded by: Henry H. Rose

Los Angeles County Board of Supervisors 2nd district
- In office 1901–1909
- Preceded by: Robert E. Wirsching
- Succeeded by: Henry D. McCabe

Personal details
- Born: September 21, 1839 Glasgow, Scotland
- Died: August 2, 1923 (aged 83) Los Angeles, California, US

George Alexander (September 21, 1839 – August 2, 1923) was a political figure who, from 1909 to 1913, served as the 28th mayor of Los Angeles, California.

Born in Glasgow, Scotland in 1839, he moved with his parents to the United States at the age of 11. In 1862, during the second year of the Civil War, he married Annie Yeiser in Iowa and participated in combat after enlisting in the Iowa volunteers. After the war, he settled in the small Iowa city of Belle Plaine, and in 1870 started his own grain and feed business.

In 1887, at the age of 48, Alexander moved west to Los Angeles and expanded his grain business. By 1892, he began his governmental career in the County Recorder's office. In 1901, he was elected to the Los Angeles County Board of Supervisors and served until 1909. In 1909 he ran for mayor in an election against council member Fred C. Wheeler and became mayor of Los Angeles on March 26, 1909. He served until July 1, 1913.

George Alexander died in Los Angeles in 1923, seven weeks before his 84th birthday, and is interred there in Angelus-Rosedale Cemetery.

| Preceded by Robert E. Wirsching | Los Angeles County Board of Supervisors; 2nd district 1901—1909 | Succeeded by Henry D. McCabe |
