= 2013 Los Angeles City Controller election =

- May 21, 2013
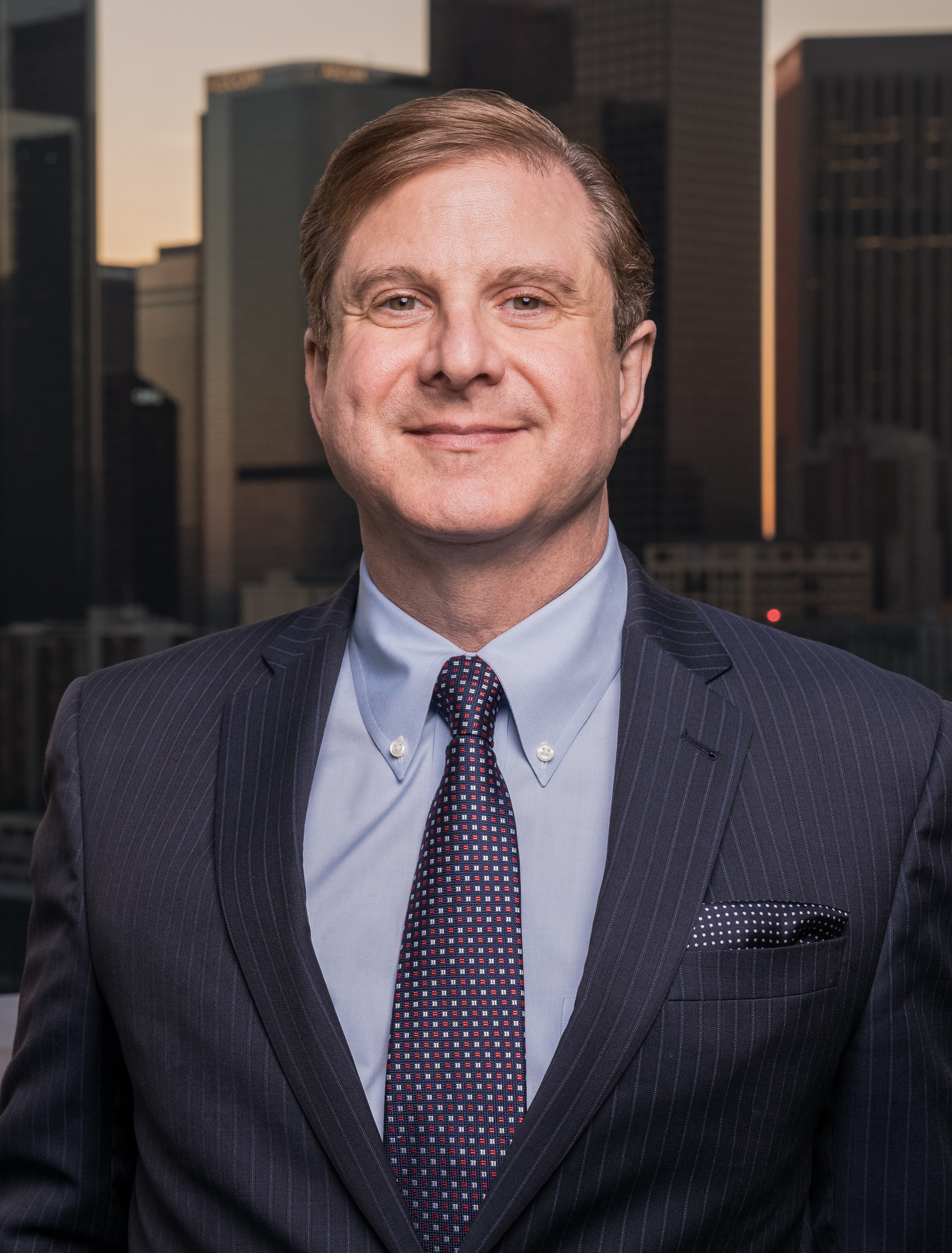

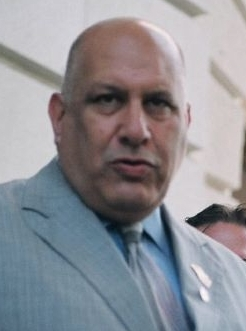

Candidate	Ron Galperin	Dennis Zine
First round	125,006 (37.8%)	120,747 (36.5%)
Runoff	209,897 (56.6%)	160,929 (43.4%)
Candidate	Analilia Joya	Jeff Bornstein	Ankur Patel
First round	31,881 (9.6%)	22,912 (6.9%)	18,955 (5.7%)
Runoff	Eliminated	Eliminated	Eliminated
City Controller before election
Wendy Greuel
Elected City Controller
Ron Galperin

The 2013 Los Angeles City Controller election was held on March 5, 2013 to elect the Los Angeles City Controller. Voters chose from candidates in a nonpartisan primary, but as no candidate received a majority of the vote, a top-two runoff election occurred on May 21, 2013. Incumbent City Controller Wendy Greuel chose not to seek re-election and unsuccessfully ran for mayor.

== Candidates ==
=== Advanced to runoff ===
- Ron Galperin, attorney
- Dennis Zine, city councilman from the 3rd district (2001–2013)

=== Eliminated in primary ===
- Analilia Joya, teacher
- Jeff Bornstein, salesman
- Ankur Patel, graduate student
- Cary Brazeman, community activist and former real estate executive

== Background ==
The Los Angeles City Controller is an official in the city government, serving as the paymaster and chief accounting officer. Similar to the Mayor and City Attorney, the City Controller is elected by popular vote every four years, with a runoff election held if no candidate secures more than 50% of the vote. Elections in Los Angeles have been nonpartisan since 1909, meaning candidates' party affiliations do not appear on the ballot.

The incumbent City Controller was Wendy Greuel, a member of the Democratic Party who was first elected to the position in 2009. While eligible to run for a second term, she chose to run for mayor, placing second in the primary and ultimately losing by 9 points to Eric Garcetti.

== Endorsements ==
Endorsements in bold were made after the primary election.

Ron Galperin

Local officials

- Laura Chick, former Los Angeles City Controller (2001–2009)
- Rick Tuttle, former Los Angeles City Controller (1985–2001)

Trade unions

- Service Employees International Union Local 721

Newspapers

- Los Angeles Times
- Los Angeles Daily News
- La Opinión
Dennis Zine

State legislators

- **Gloria Molina**, former state assemblymember from the 56th district (1982–1987) and member of the Los Angeles County Board of Supervisors from the 1st district (1991–2014)

Local officials

- Antonio Villaraigosa, mayor of Los Angeles (2005–2013)

Labor unions

- Los Angeles Police Protective League

Organizations

- Armenian Council of America PAC

Newspapers

- Los Angeles Sentinel

== Results ==
2013 Los Angeles City Controller election
Primary election
Candidate	Votes	%
Ron Galperin	95,507	37.13%
Dennis Zine	95,268	37.03%
Analilia Joya	24,868	9.67%
Jeff Bornstein	18,282	7.11%
Ankur Patel	14,405	5.60%
Cary Brazeman	8,918	3.47%
Total votes	**257,248**	**100.00%**
General election
Ron Galperin	**209,897**	**56.60%**
Dennis Zine	160,929	43.40%
Total votes	**370,826**	**100.00%**

== See also ==
- 2013 Los Angeles elections
