= 2009 Los Angeles elections =

2009 Los Angeles election
- March 3, 2009

8 out of 15 seats in the City Council 8 seats needed for a majority
	Majority party	Minority party
Party	Democratic	Republican
Seats before	13	2
Seats won	7	1
Seats after	13	2
Seat change	Steady	Steady

The 2009 elections for elected officials in Los Angeles took place on March 3, 2009, with run-off elections on May 19, 2009. The mayor, city attorney, city controller and eight out of the fifteen members of the city council were up for election.

== Results ==
Officially all candidates are non-partisan. *Incumbent.

=== Mayor ===
Incumbent Antonio Villaraigosa was re-elected.

Los Angeles mayoral general election, March 3, 2009
Party	Candidate	Votes	%	±%
Democratic	Antonio Villaraigosa (incumbent)	152,613	55.65%	+22.55%
Independent	Walter Moore	71,937	26.23%	+23.46%
Independent	Gordon Turner	17,554	6.40%	
Independent	David "Zuma Dogg" Saltzburg	9,115	3.32%	
Independent	Stevan Torres	9,114	3.31%	
Republican	David R. Hernandez	5,225	1.91%	
Independent	Craig X. Rubin	4,158	1.51%	
Socialism and Liberation	Carlos Alvarez	3,047	1.11%	
Socialist Workers	James Harris	2,461	0.90%	
Republican	Phil Jennerjahn	2,432	0.89%	
Total votes		274,233	100.00	
Turnout		285,658	17.90%	−10.63%
Registered electors		1,596,165		
Democratic hold		Swing		

=== City attorney ===
Incumbent Rocky Delgadillo could not stand for re-election due to term limits. Carmen Trutanich was elected after the run-off election on May 19, 2009.

Los Angeles City Attorney general election, May 19, 2009
Party	Candidate	Votes	%
Democratic	Carmen Trutanich	131,777	73.99
Democratic	Jack Weiss	104,622	26.01
Total votes		236.399	100.00

=== City controller ===
Incumbent Laura N. Chick could not stand for re-election due to term limits.

Los Angeles city controller general election, March 3, 2009
Party	Candidate	Votes	%	±%
Democratic	Wendy Greuel	168,680	65.40%	
Republican	Kathleen "Suzy" Evans	47,758	18.52%	
Independent	Nick Patsaouras	41,464	16.08%	
Total votes		257,902	100.00	
Turnout		285,658	17.90%	−10.63%
Registered electors		1,596,165		
Democratic hold		Swing		

=== City council ===
District 1

Los Angeles City Council District 1 general election, March 3, 2009
Party	Candidate	Votes	%	±%
Democratic	Ed Reyes	7,608	76.06%	
Independent	Jesus G. "Jesse" Rosas	2,395	23.94%	
Total votes		10,003	100.00	
Democratic hold		Swing		

District 3

Los Angeles City Council District 3 general election, March 3, 2009
Party	Candidate	Votes	%	±%
Republican	Dennis Zine	17,370	71.20%	
Independent	Jeff Bornstein	7,027	28.80%	
Total votes		24,397	100.00	
Republican hold		Swing		

District 5
Incumbent Jack Weiss was running for the city attorney post.

Los Angeles City Council District 5 primary election, March 3, 2009
Party	Candidate	Votes	%	±%
Democratic	David "Ty" Vahedi	6,945	21.71%	
Democratic	Paul Koretz	6,881	21.51%	
Independent	Adeena N. Bleich	5,065	15.84%	
Independent	Ron Galperin	4,874	15.24%	
Independent	Robyn Ritter Simon	4,458	13.94%	
Independent	Robert Schwartz	3,762	11.76%	
Total votes		31,985	100.00	

Los Angeles City Council District 5 general election, May 19, 2009
Party	Candidate	Votes	%	±%
Democratic	Paul Koretz	18,547	50.99%	
Democratic	David "Ty" Vahedi	17,825	49.01%	
Total votes		36,372	100.00	
Registered electors		166,743		
Democratic hold		Swing		

District 7

Los Angeles City Council District 7 general election, March 3, 2009
Party	Candidate	Votes	%	±%
Democratic	Richard Alarcón	8,450	100.00%	
Total votes		8,450	100.00	
Democratic hold		Swing		

District 9

Los Angeles City Council District 9 general election, March 3, 2009
Party	Candidate	Votes	%	±%
Democratic	Jan Perry	7,158	100.00%	
Total votes		7,158	100.00	
Democratic hold		Swing		

District 11

Los Angeles City Council District 11 general election, March 3, 2009
Party	Candidate	Votes	%	±%
Democratic	Bill Rosendahl	20,539	75.07%	
Independent	Harry "Craig" Wilson	6,822	24.93%	
Total votes		27,361	100.00	
Democratic hold		Swing		

District 13

Los Angeles City Council District 13 general election, March 3, 2009
Party	Candidate	Votes	%	±%
Democratic	Eric Garcetti	8,605	72.12%	
Independent	Gary Slossberg	3,326	27.88%	
Total votes		11,931	100.00	
Democratic hold		Swing		

District 15

Los Angeles City Council District 15 general election, March 3, 2009
Party	Candidate	Votes	%	±%
Democratic	Janice Hahn	10,869	76.07%	
Republican	Christopher Salabaj	3,420	23.93%	
Total votes		14,289	100.00	
Democratic hold		Swing		
