= 2013 Los Angeles elections =

- March 3, 2013; May 21, 2013

8 out of 15 seats in the City Council 8 seats needed for a majority
	Majority party	Minority party
Party	Democratic	Republican
Seats before	13	2
Seats won	8	0
Seats after	14	1
Seat change	▲1	▼1

The 2013 Los Angeles election was held on March 5, 2013 in the city of Los Angeles, California. Voters elected candidates in a nonpartisan primary, with runoff elections scheduled for May 21, 2013. The executive offices of Mayor, City Attorney, and City Controller, as well as eight seats of the City Council, were up for election.

Municipal elections in California are officially nonpartisan; candidates' party affiliations do not appear on the ballot.

== Mayor ==
2013 Los Angeles mayoral election
Primary election
Candidate	Votes	%
Eric Garcetti	93,978	32.94
Wendy Greuel	83,308	29.20
Kevin James	46,684	16.36
Jan Perry	45,480	15.94
Emanuel Pleitez	11,716	4.11
Norton Sandler	1,598	0.56
Addie Miller	1,401	0.49
YJ Draiman	1,174	0.41
Total votes	285,339	100.00
General election
Eric Garcetti	222,300	54.23
Wendy Greuel	187,609	45.77
Total votes	409,909	100.00

== City Attorney ==
2013 Los Angeles City Attorney election
Primary election
Candidate	Votes	%
Mike Feuer	116,883	43.76
Carmen Trutanich (incumbent)	80,587	30.17
Greig Smith	46,578	17.44
Noel Weiss	23,045	8.63
Total votes	267,093	100.00
General election
Mike Feuer	238,237	62.27
Carmen Trutanich (incumbent)	144,334	37.73
Total votes	382,571	100.00

== City Controller ==
2013 Los Angeles City Controller election
Primary election
Candidate	Votes	%
Ron Galperin	95,507	37.13
Dennis Zine	95,268	37.03
Analilia Joya	24,868	9.67
Jeff Bornstein	18,282	7.11
Ankur Patel	14,405	5.60
Cary Brazeman	8,918	3.47
Total votes	257,248	100.00
General election
Ron Galperin	209,897	56.60
Dennis Zine	160,929	43.40
Total votes	370,826	100.00

== City Council ==
=== District 1 ===
2013 Los Angeles City Council District 1 election
Primary election
Candidate	Votes	%
Gil Cedillo	6,613	49.38
Jose Gardea	5,797	43.28
Jesse Rosas	983	7.34
Total votes	13,393	100.00
General election
Gil Cedillo	10,152	51.95
Jose Gardea	9,389	48.05
Total votes	19,541	100.00

=== District 3 ===
2013 Los Angeles City Council District 3 election
Primary election
Candidate	Votes	%
Bob Blumenfield	9,895	51.63
Joyce Pearson	3,827	19.97
Cary Iaccino	1,872	9.77
Elizabeth Badger	1,800	9.39
Steven Presberg	900	4.70
Scott Silverstein	873	4.56
Total votes	19,167	100.00

=== District 5 ===
2013 Los Angeles City Council District 5 election
Primary election
Candidate	Votes	%
Paul Koretz (incumbent)	17,096	73.99
Mark Matthew Herd	6,011	26.01
Total votes	23,107	100.00

=== District 7 ===
2013 Los Angeles City Council District 7 election
Primary election
Candidate	Votes	%
Felipe Fuentes	7,699	51.32
Nicole Chase	4,051	27.01
Krystee Clark	1,631	10.87
David Barron	1,620	10.80
Total votes	15,001	100.00

=== District 9 ===
2013 Los Angeles City Council District 9 election
Primary election
Candidate	Votes	%
Curren Price	2,452	27.23
Ana Cubas	2,158	23.96
Mike Davis	1,413	15.69
Terry Hara	1,046	11.62
David Roberts	924	10.26
Ron Gochez	715	7.94
Manny Aldana Jr.	297	3.30
Total votes	9,005	100.00
General election
Curren Price	6,421	52.40
Ana Cubas	5,833	47.60
Total votes	12,254	100.00

=== District 11 ===
2013 Los Angeles City Council District 11 election
Primary election
Candidate	Votes	%
Mike Bonin	17,566	61.20
Tina Hess	5,155	17.96
Frederick Sutton	3,343	11.65
Odysseus Bostick	2,639	9.19
Total votes	28,703	100.00

=== District 13 ===
2013 Los Angeles City Council District 13 election
Primary election
Candidate	Votes	%
Mitch O'Farrell	3,535	18.44
John Choi	3,158	16.47
Sam Kbushyan	2,308	12.04
Josh Post	2,099	10.95
Alexander Cruz de Ocampo	2,012	10.50
Matt Szabo	1,440	7.51
Robert Negrete	1,400	7.30
Octavio Pescador	1,199	6.26
Jose Sigala	721	3.76
Emile Mack	672	3.51
Mike Schaefer	359	1.87
Roberto Haraldson	267	1.39
Total votes	19,170	100.00
General election
Mitch O'Farrell	13,940	52.75
John Choi	12,485	47.25
Total votes	26,425	100.00

=== District 15 ===
2013 Los Angeles City Council District 15 election
Primary election
Candidate	Votes	%
Joe Buscaino (incumbent)	11,723	83.33
James Law	2,255	16.67
Total votes	13,528	100.00
