= 2017 Los Angeles elections =

2017 Los Angeles election
- March 7, 2017; May 16, 2017

8 out of 15 seats in the City Council 8 seats needed for a majority
	Majority party	Minority party
Party	Democratic	Republican
Seats before	14	1
Seats won	8	0
Seats after	14	1
Seat change	Steady	Steady

Elections were held on March 7, 2017, in Los Angeles, California. Voters elected candidates in a nonpartisan primary, with runoff elections scheduled for May 16, 2017. Eight of the fifteen seats in the City Council were up for election, as well as the offices of mayor, city attorney and city controller. Four ballot measures were also on the ballot.

Municipal elections in California are officially nonpartisan; candidates' party affiliations do not appear on the ballot.

== Mayor ==
2017 Los Angeles mayoral election
- March 7, 2017
- Turnout: 20.1%
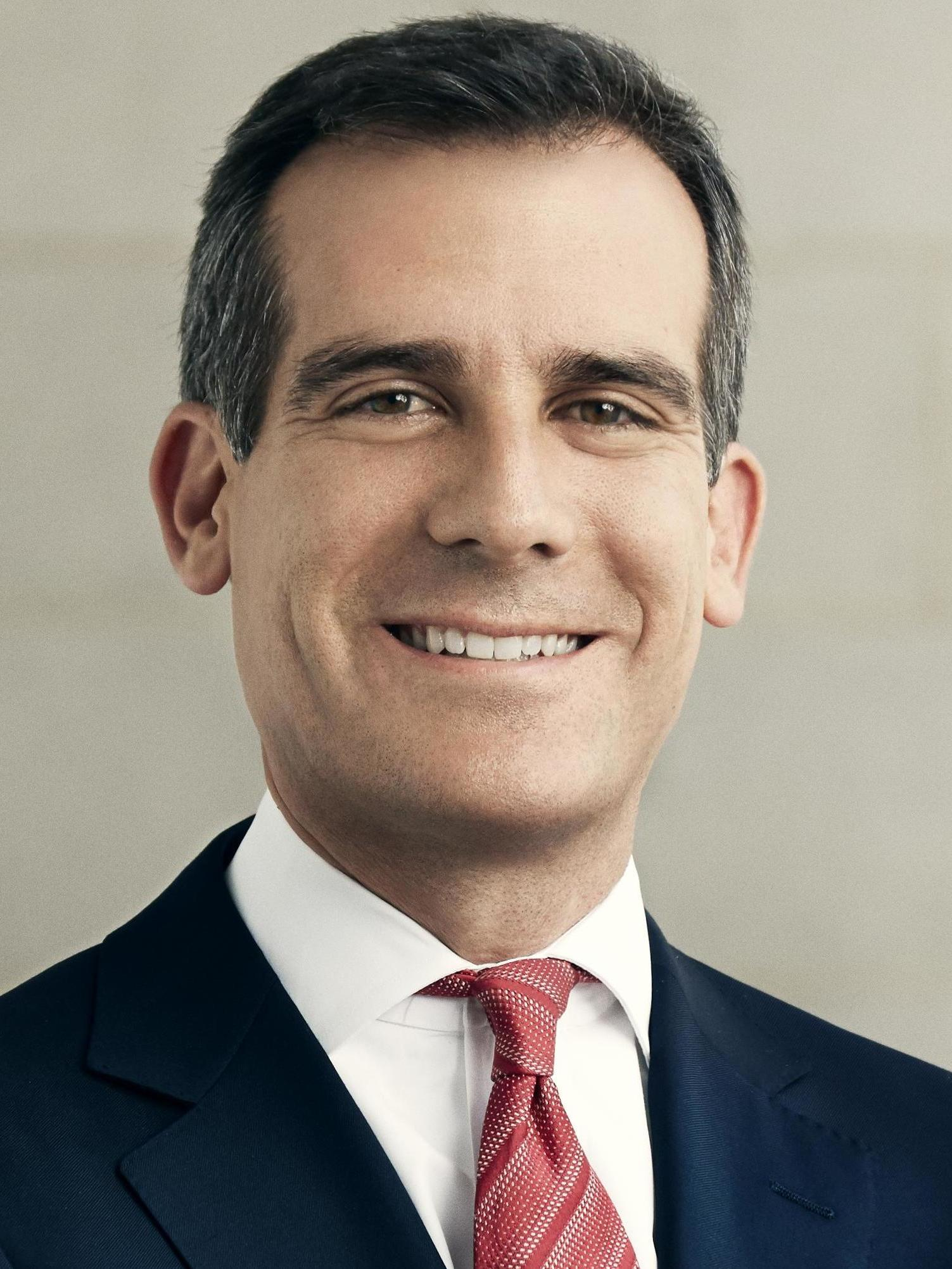
Candidate	Eric Garcetti	Mitchell Schwartz
First round	331,310; 81.37%	33,228; 8.16%
Mayor before election
Eric Garcetti
Elected Mayor
Eric Garcetti

2017 Los Angeles mayoral election
Primary election
Candidate	Votes	%
Eric Garcetti (incumbent)	331,310	81.37
Mitchell J. Schwartz	33,228	8.16
David Hernandez	13,346	3.28
Diane Harman	5,115	1.26
David Saltsburg	4,809	1.18
Dennis Richter	4,558	1.12
YJ Draiman	3,705	0.91
Frantz Pierre	3,386	0.83
Eric Preven	3,023	0.74
Yuval Kremer	2,436	0.60
Paul E. Amori	2,231	0.55
Total votes	407,147	100.00

== City Attorney ==
2017 Los Angeles City Attorney election
- March 7, 2017
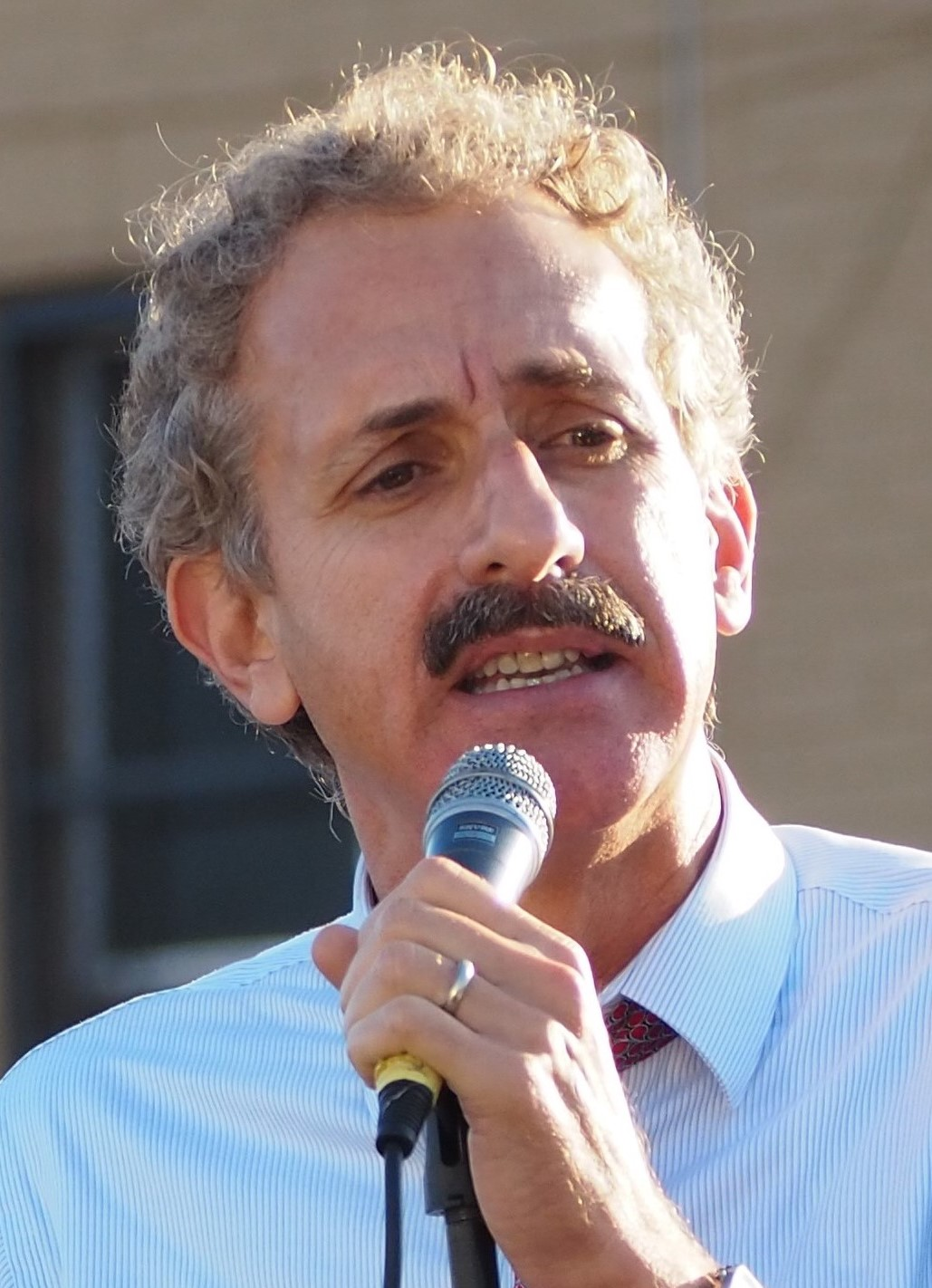
Candidate	Mike Feuer
First round	306,867; 100.00%
City Attorney before election
Mike Feuer
City Attorney
Mike Feuer

2017 Los Angeles City Attorney election
Primary election
Candidate	Votes	%
Mike Feuer (incumbent)	306,867	100.00
Total votes	306,867	100.00

== City Controller ==
2017 Los Angeles City Controller election
- March 7, 2017
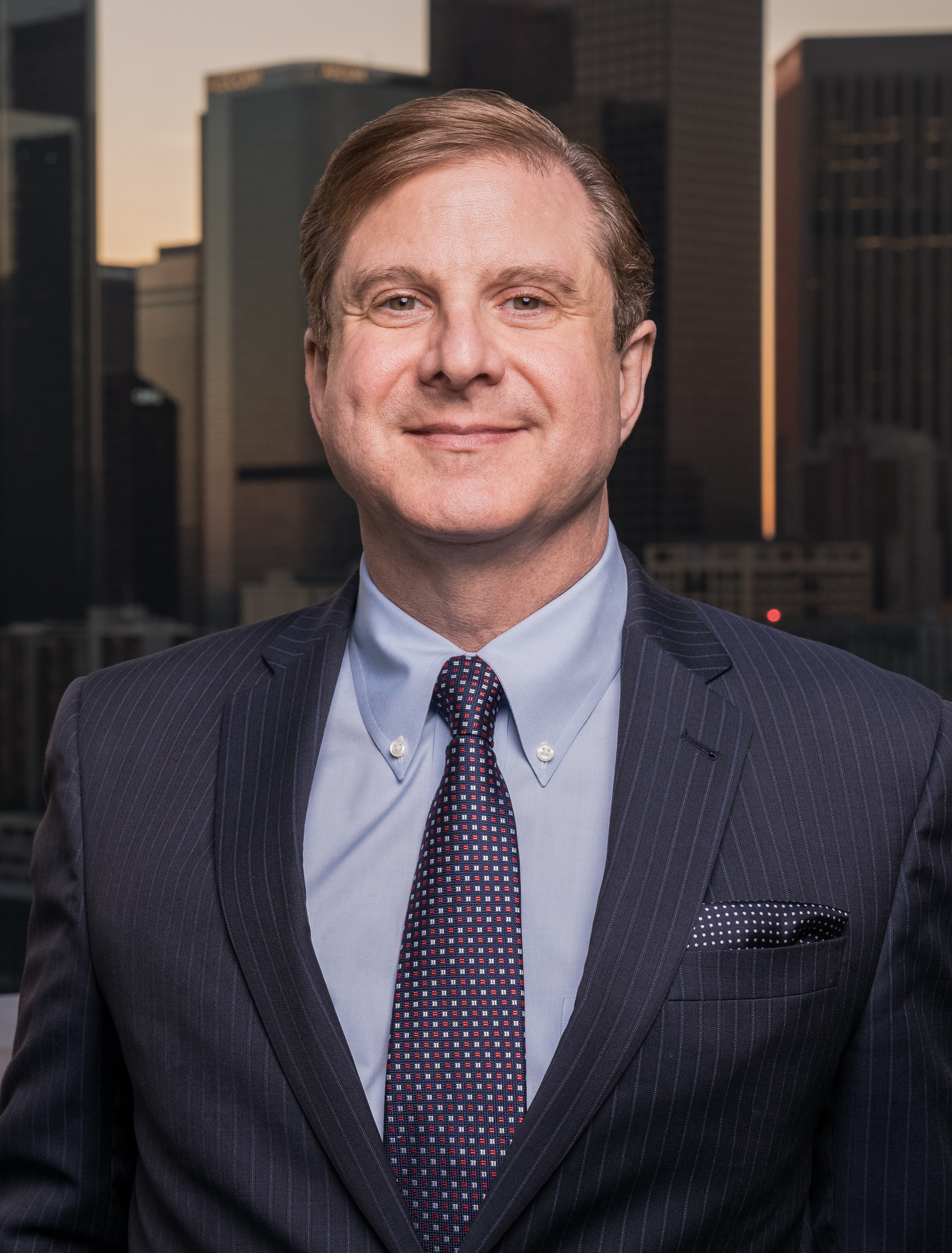
Candidate	Ron Galperin
First round	291,321; 100.00%
City Controller before election
Ron Galperin
City Controller
Ron Galperin

2017 Los Angeles City Controller election
Primary election
Candidate	Votes	%
Ron Galperin (incumbent)	291,321	100.00
Total votes	291,321	100.00

== City Council ==
=== District 1 ===
2017 Los Angeles's 1st City Council district election
- March 7, 2017 and May 16, 2017
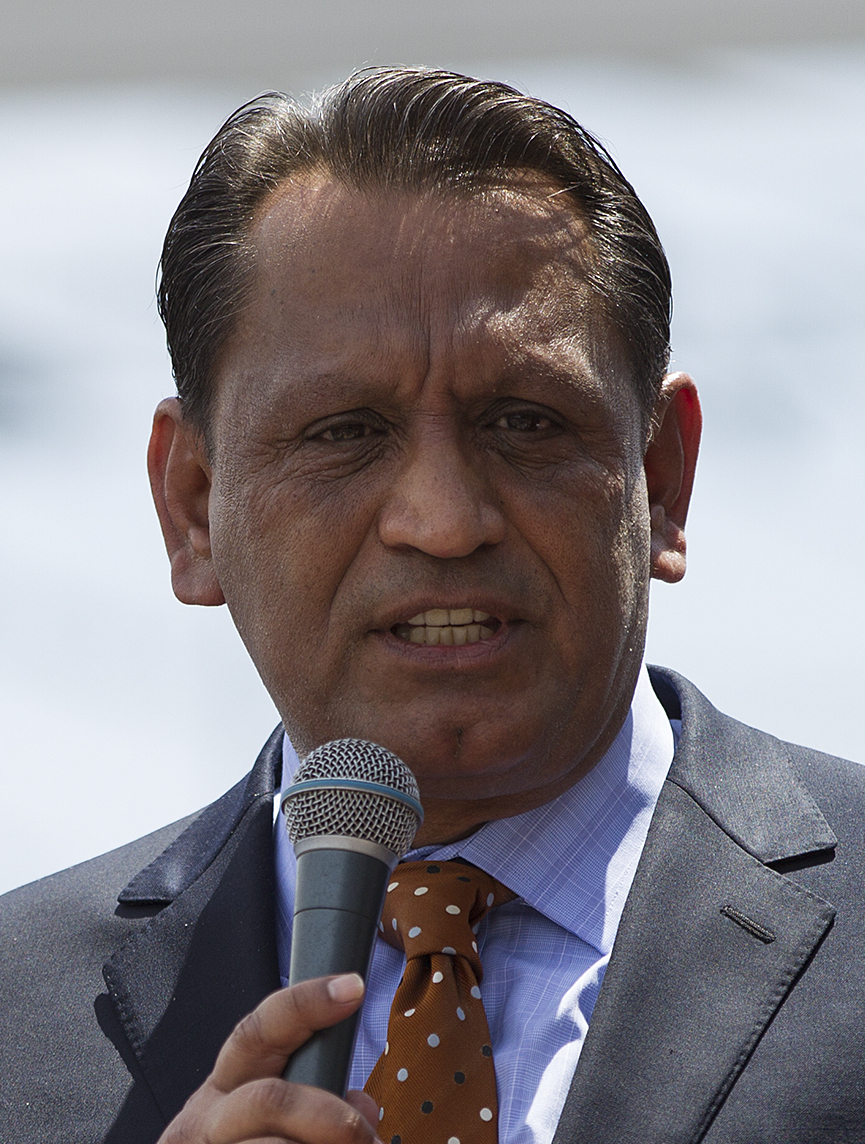

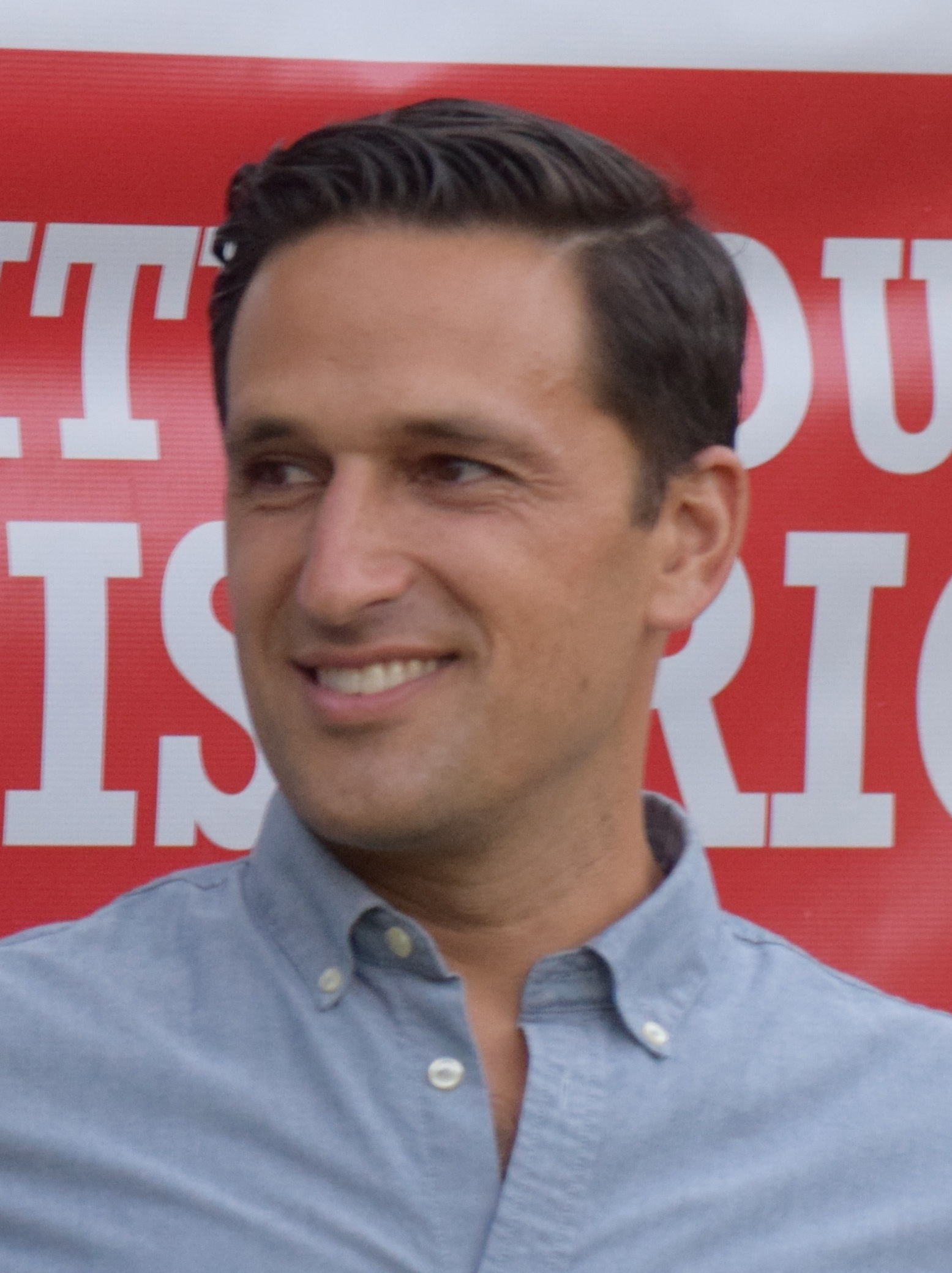

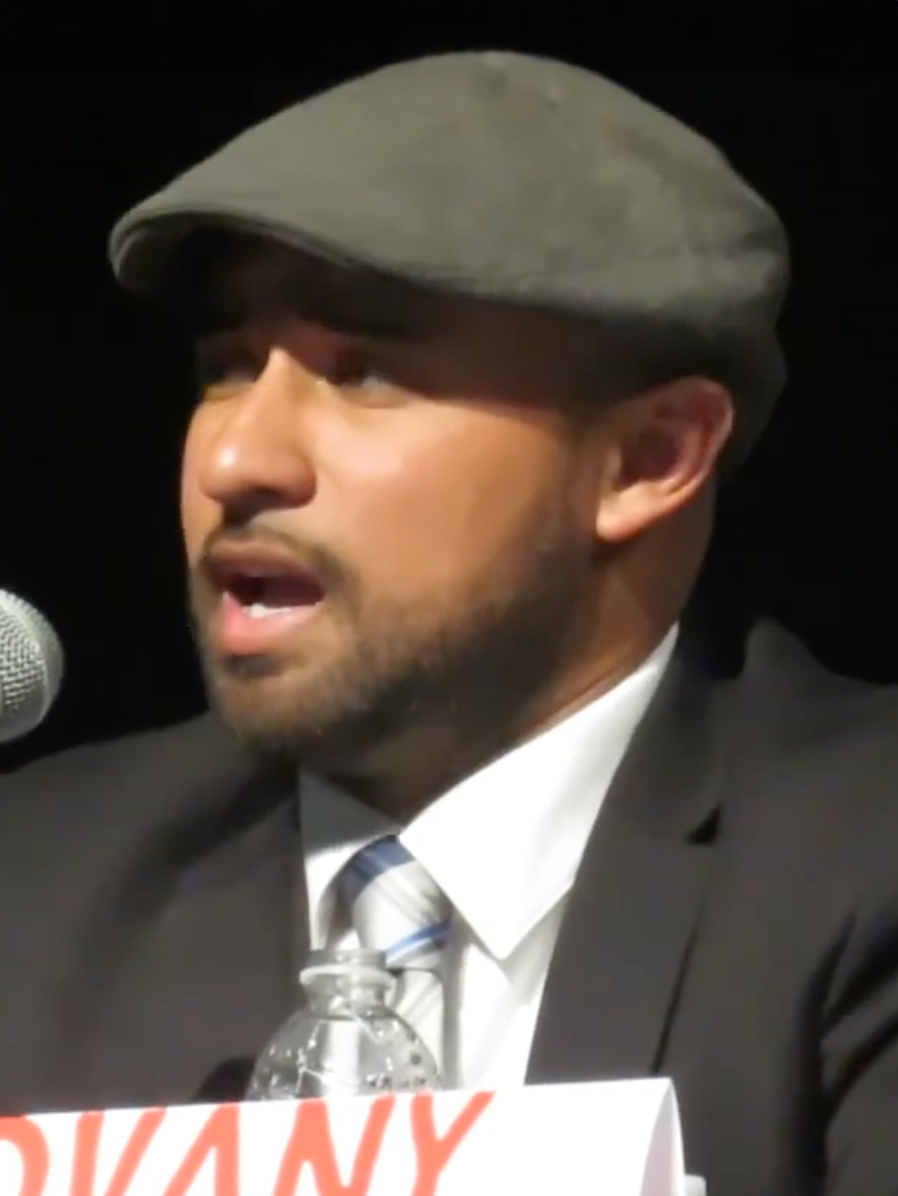
Candidate	Gil Cedillo	Joe Bray-Ali	Giovany Hernandez
First round	10,396; 49.34%	8,000; 37.97%	1,798; 8.53%
Runoff	11,415; 71.63%	4,521; 28.37%	Eliminated
City Councilmember before election
Gil Cedillo
City Councilmember
Gil Cedillo

The 1st district covered mostly Northeast Los Angeles, including MacArthur Park, Koreatown, Mount Washington and Cypress Park. The incumbent was Gil Cedillo, who was first elected in 2013 and was seeking a second term. Cedillo nearly won election outright in the primary, but support for community activist and former bike store owner Joe Bray-Ali forced him into a runoff.

Bray-Ali's campaign collapsed after a series of scandals involving him surfaced. In April 2017, it was revealed by LAist that Bray-Ali had made racist, fat shaming, and transphobic comments Voat, which prompted councilmember Mitch O'Farrell and the Los Angeles Times to pull their endorsements. Despite calls on Bray-Ali to drop out, he refused to do so and apologized for the comments. Bray-Ali also admitted to having extramarital affairs and failing to pay taxes.

In the runoff election, Cedillo defeated Bray-Ali in a landslide.

==== Candidates ====
- Luca Barton (write-in)
- Joe Bray-Ali, cycling activist
- Gil Cedillo, incumbent councilor
- Giovanny Hernandez, community organizer
- Jesse Rosas, resident

==== Endorsements ====
Joe Bray-Ali

City councilmembers

- ~~Mitch O'Farrell, member of the Los Angeles City Council for the 13th district~~ (rescinded endorsement after scandals)

Newspapers and other media

- ~~Los Angeles Times~~ (rescinded endorsement after scandals)
Gil Cedillo

State officeholders

- Xavier Becerra, attorney general of California
- Jerry Brown, governor of California

State senators

- Kevin de León, president pro tempore of the California State Senate

Mayors

- Eric Garcetti, mayor of Los Angeles

City councilmembers

- Paul Krekorian, member of the Los Angeles City Council for the 2nd district
- Nury Martinez, member of the Los Angeles City Council for the 6th district
- Curren Price, member of the Los Angeles City Council for the 9th district
- David Ryu, member of the Los Angeles City Council for the 4th district
- Herb Wesson, council president and member of the Los Angeles City Council for the 10th district

Organizations

- Americans for Democratic Action
- Los Angeles County Young Democrats

==== Results ====
2017 Los Angeles's 1st City Council district election
Primary election
Candidate	Votes	%
Gil Cedillo (incumbent)	10,396	49.34
Joe Bray-Ali	8,000	37.97
Giovany Hernandez	1,798	8.53
Jesse Rosas	875	4.15
Luca Barton (write-in)	28	0.13
Total votes	21,097	100.00
General election
Gil Cedillo (incumbent)	11,415	71.63
Joe Bray-Ali	4,521	28.37
Total votes	15,936	100.00

=== District 3 ===
2017 Los Angeles's 3rd City Council district election
- March 7, 2017
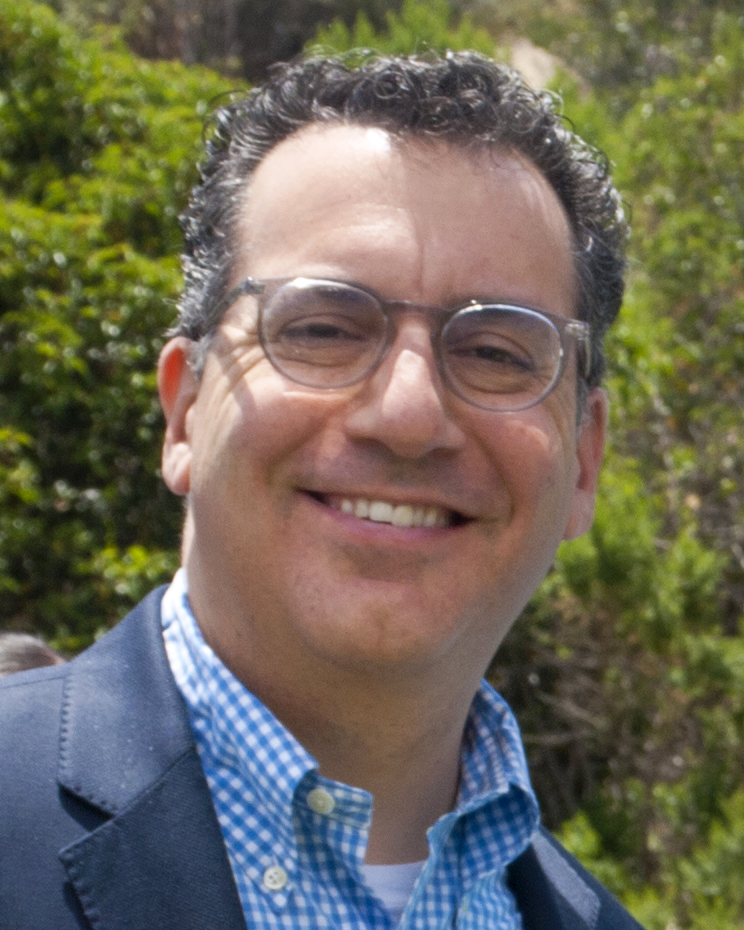
Candidate	Bob Blumenfield
First round	19,063; 100.00%
City Councilmember before election
Bob Blumenfield
City Council member
Bob Blumenfield

The 3rd district encompassed southwestern San Fernando Valley neighborhoods of Los Angeles, including Canoga Park, Reseda, Tarzana, Winnetka, and Woodland Hills. The incumbent was Bob Blumenfield, who was elected in 2013 and was seeking a second term. He ran unopposed and won election outright in the primary.

==== Results ====
2017 Los Angeles's 3rd City Council district election
Primary election
Candidate	Votes	%
Bob Blumenfield (incumbent)	19,063	100.00
Total votes	19,063	100.00

=== District 5 ===
2017 Los Angeles's 5th City Council district election

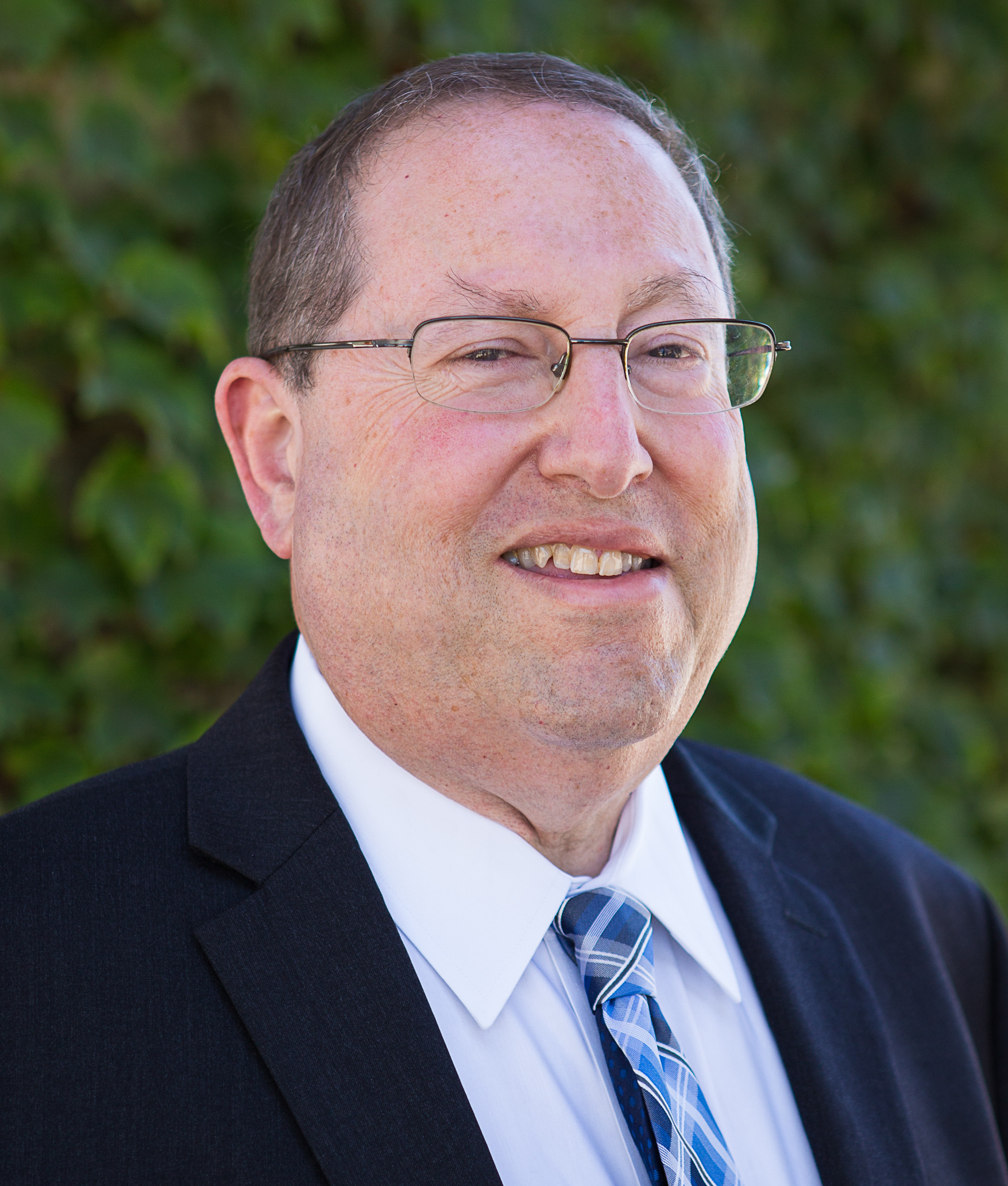

Candidate	Paul Koretz	Jesse Max Creed
First round	25,914; 65.88%	11,986; 30.47%
City Council before election
Paul Koretz
City Council
Paul Koretz

The 5th district covered most of the Mid-City West region, including Bel Air, Beverly Crest, Beverly Grove, Beverlywood, Carthay Circle, Century City, Cheviot Hills, Fairfax District, Holmby Hills, Melrose, Palms, Pico-Robertson, Westwood, Westside Village, and Encino.

The incumbent was Paul Koretz, who was first elected in 2009 and was seeking a third term. Koretz was re-elected over Jesse Max Creed and Mark Matthew Herd by a landslide.

==== Candidates ====
- Jesse Max Creed, attorney
- Mark Matthew Herd, community organizer and activist
- Paul Koretz, incumbent councilor

==== Results ====
2017 Los Angeles's 5th City Council district election
Primary election
Candidate	Votes	%
Paul Koretz (incumbent)	25,914	65.88
Jesse Max Creed	11,986	30.47
Mark Matthew Herd	1,435	3.65
Total votes	39,335	100.00

=== District 7 ===
2017 Los Angeles's 7th City Council district election
- March 7, 2017 and May 16, 2017
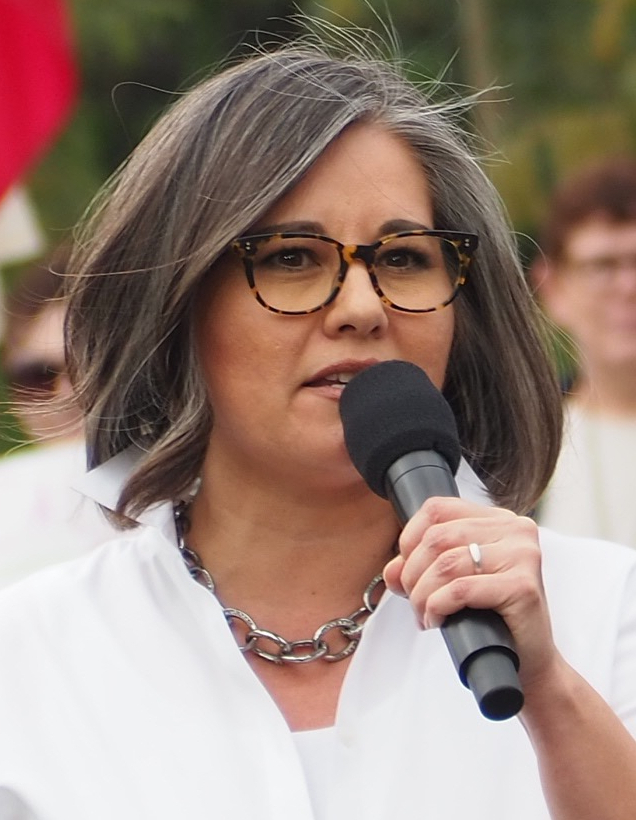

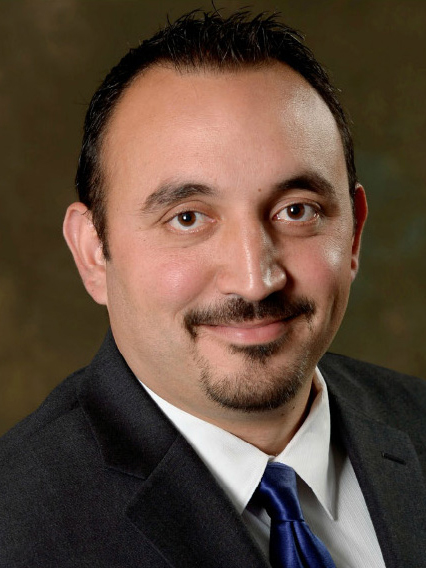

Candidate	Monica Rodriguez	Karo Torossian	Mónica Ratliff
First round	6,091; 27.82%	3,603; 16.46%	3,104; 14.18%
Runoff	9,588; 53.64%	8,287; 46.36%	Eliminated
Candidate	Arthur Miner	Dale Gibson	Venessa Martinez
First round	1,775; 8.11%	1,351; 6.17%	1,160; 5.30%
Runoff	Eliminated	Eliminated	Eliminated
City Council before election
Vacant
City Council
Monica Rodriguez

The 7th district covered Northern Los Angeles, including Sunland-Tujunga, Lake View Terrace, Pacoima and Shadow Hills. The district was the only open seat due to the resignation of Felipe Fuentes on September 11, 2016, in order to start working as a lobbyist. Former Los Angeles Board of Public Works Commissioner Monica Rodriguez and City Council staffer Karo Torossian advanced to the runoff. In the runoff election, Rodriguez defeated Torossian by seven points with the help of labor spending. Torossian did not concede the race until ten days later after results showed Rodriguez's margin of victory widening.

==== Candidates ====
- Olga Ayala, community organizer
- Nicole Chase, Boys & Girls Club development director
- Fred A. Flores, veterans advocate
- Dale Gibson, stuntman
- Terrence Gomes, financial adviser
- John T. Higginson, equestrian center owner
- Venessa Martinez, state deputy attorney general
- Arthur Miner, pub owner and engineer
- Mónica Ratliff, Los Angeles Unified School District board member
- Monica Rodriguez, former Public Works commissioner
- Constance Saunders, lender mortgage subservicer
- Mike Schaefer, public interest advocate
- Karo Torossian, City Council planning director for Paul Krekorian

==== Results ====
2017 Los Angeles's 7th City Council district election
Primary election
Candidate	Votes	%
Monica Rodriguez	6,091	27.82
Karo Torossian	3,603	16.46
Mónica Ratliff	3,104	14.18
Arthur Miner	1,775	8.11
Dale Gibson	1,351	6.17
Venessa Martinez	1,160	5.30
Olga Ayala	931	4.25
Fred A. Flores	854	3.90
Nicole Chase	596	2.72
Carlos Lara	314	1.43
Krystee Clark	290	1.32
Mark Reed	275	1.26
Mike Schaefer	266	1.21
Connie Saunders	258	1.18
Franki Marie Becerra	226	1.03
David Jesse Barron	218	1.00
John T. Higginson	169	0.77
Terrence Gomes	149	0.68
José G. Castillo	139	0.63
Bonnie D. Corwin	127	0.58
Total votes	21,896	100.00
General election
Monica Rodriguez	9,588	53.64
Karo Torossian	8,287	46.36
Total votes	17,875	100.00

=== District 9 ===
2017 Los Angeles City Council District 9 election
Primary election
Candidate	Votes	%
Curren Price (incumbent)	6,565	62.96
Jorge Nuño	2,400	23.02
Adriana Cabrera	1,462	14.02
Total votes	10,427	100.00

=== District 11 ===
2017 Los Angeles City Council District 11 election
Primary election
Candidate	Votes	%
Mike Bonin (incumbent)	31,865	71.00
Mark Ryavec	7,047	15.70
Robin Rudisill	4,967	13.30
Total votes	43,879	100.00

=== District 13 ===
2017 Los Angeles City Council District 13 election
Primary election
Candidate	Votes	%
Mitch O'Farrell (incumbent)	17,053	59.26
Sylvie Shain	4,338	15.07
Jessica Salans	3,902	13.56
David de la Torre	1,534	5.33
Doug Haines	1,123	3.90
Bill Zide	829	2.88
Total votes	28,779	100.00

=== District 15 ===
2017 Los Angeles City Council District 15 election
Primary election
Candidate	Votes	%
Joe Buscaino (incumbent)	12,497	74.85
Caney Arnold	2,750	16.47
Noel Gould	1,449	8.68
Total votes	16,696	100.00

== Ballot measures ==
=== Measure M ===
Cannabis Regulation After Citizen Input, Taxation and Enforcement
Choice	Votes	%
For	319,017	80.45
Against	77,523	19.55
Total	396,540	100.00

=== Measure N ===
Cannabis Activity Permits, Regulation and Taxation
Choice	Votes	%
For	134,787	34.95
Against	250,896	65.05
Total	385,683	100.00

=== Measure P ===
Maximum Term of Harbor Department Leases
Choice	Votes	%
For	251,398	68.42
Against	116,059	31.58
Total	367,457	100.00

=== Measure S ===
Building Moratorium; Restrictions on General Plan Amendments; Required Review of General Plan
Choice	Votes	%
For	121,101	29.60
Against	288,012	70.40
Total	409,113	100.00
