= Los Angeles's 3rd City Council district =

American legislative district

Councilmember
Bob Blumenfield; D–Reseda
since July 1, 2013
- Demographics: 44.8% White; 3.9% Black; 36.4% Hispanic; 11.7% Asian; 0.31% Other
- Population (2020): 256,822
- Registered voters (2017): 138,309
- Website: cd3.lacity.gov

Los Angeles's 3rd City Council district is one of the fifteen districts in the Los Angeles City Council. It is currently represented by Democrat Bob Blumenfield since 2013 after winning an election to succeed Dennis Zine, who termed out and ran for City Controller that year.

The district was created in 1925 after a new city charter was passed, which replaced the former "at large" voting system for a nine-member council with a district system with a 15-member council.

== Geography ==
The Third District extends to the western boundary of both Los Angeles City and Los Angeles County, bordering Ventura County. To the east, it ends at White Oak and Lindley Avenue. It includes the neighborhoods of Woodland Hills, Tarzana, Reseda, Winnetka and Canoga Park.

The district is inside California's 32nd congressional district, 46th State Assembly district, 20th and 27th State Senatorial districts.

=== Historical boundaries ===
At its creation, it was mostly south of the Santa Monica Mountains east of Sawtelle, with its eastern boundary at Western Avenue, and its southern boundary running along Washington Boulevard to embrace the Palms area. It included the Los Angeles Country Club and the Sawtelle district, and all the Santa Monica Mountains west of Sawtelle to the Ventura County line, including Pacific Palisades and Topanga Canyon. In 1928, the northern boundary was at the "crest of the Santa Monica Mountains and the west boundary the city limits. The Pacific Ocean is the westerly portion of the south boundary of the district, then the line runs southeast along the city limits of Santa Monica to Cambridge Street, south to Pico Boulevard, southeast on Manning avenue and easterly in an irregular line to Eighth Street and Western Avenue. The line runs north on Western avenue to Melrose avenue. . . ." In 1933, due to its size, it lost much of its territory, with the new boundaries south by Pico Boulevard, east by Highland Avenue, north by Hollywood Hills, extending west to the ocean and Santa Monica Canyon."

In 1940, the district was an irregularly shaped east-west district including the area south of West Hollywood and Beverly Hills, with Westwood, Brentwood and Pacific Palisades, to the coast. By 1951, it had West Hollywood, UCLA and contiguous territory and then ventures over the Santa Monica Mountains to take in a portion of the San Fernando Valley, including Tarzana, Woodland Hills and other communities." In 1960, the district gave up Encino and part of Woodland Hills.

By 1964, the district was reduced in size when the 12th District was transferred from Downtown Los Angeles to the San Fernando Valley, taking over some of the 3rd's area. It included the southwest corner of the Valley, including Woodland Hills, Tarzana and parts of Encino, Canoga Park and Reseda. By 1981, "although the district is largely white and middle class, it is complicated and anything but homogenous. A study in contrasts, it has expensive ranch homes in Woodland Hills that are minutes away from shack-like dwellings in Canoga Park, a largely Hispanic barrio dating from the early 1900s." In 1985, Canoga Park, West Hills were now in District 12, and Reseda, west Van Nuys and parts of Tarzana and Woodland Hills were included in the district.

== Officeholders ==
=== 1889–1909 ===
Councilmember	Party	Years	Electoral history
Single-member ward established February 25, 1989
William H. Bonsall (University Park)	Republican	February 25, 1889 – December 12, 1892	Elected in 1889. Re-elected in 1890. [data missing]
Frank S. Munson (Westlake)	Republican	December 12, 1892 – December 16, 1896	Elected in 1892. Re-elected in 1894. [data missing]
Zachariah D. Mathuss (Arlington Heights)	Democratic	December 16, 1896 – December 15, 1898	Elected in 1896. Retired.
Louis F. Vetter (Downtown)	Republican	December 15, 1898 – December 12, 1900	Elected in 1898. Lost renomination.
Frank Walker (Downtown)	Democratic	December 12, 1900 – December 5, 1902	Elected in 1900. Retired to run for Mayor of Los Angeles.
Oscar E. Farish (Jefferson Park)	Democratic	December 5, 1902 – December 8, 1904	Elected in 1902. [data missing]
Sidney W. Hiller (Angelino Heights)	Republican	December 8, 1904 – December 13, 1906	Elected in 1904. [data missing]
Walter J. Wren (Westlake)	Republican	December 13, 1906 – December 10, 1909	Elected in 1906. Retired.
Single-member ward eliminated December 10, 1909

=== 1925–present ===
Councilmember	Party	Dates	Electoral history
District created July 1, 1925.
Isaac F. Hughes (Mid-Wilshire)	Republican	July 1, 1925 – June 30, 1927	Elected in 1925. Lost re-election.
Ernest L. Webster (Larchmont)	Independent	July 1, 1927 – June 30, 1931	Elected in 1927. Lost re-election.
James S. McKnight (Miracle Mile)	Progressive	July 1, 1931 – June 30, 1933	Elected in 1931. Lost re-election.
Stephen W. Cunningham (Westwood)	Republican	July 1, 1933 – June 30, 1941	Elected in 1933. Re-elected in 1935. Re-elected in 1937. Re-elected in 1939. Retired to run for Mayor of Los Angeles.
J. Win Austin (Westwood)	Republican	July 1, 1941 – June 30, 1953	Elected in 1941. Re-elected in 1943. Re-elected in 1945. Re-elected in 1947. Re-elected in 1949. Re-elected in 1951. Retired.
Robert M. Wilkinson (Porter Ranch)	Republican	July 1, 1953 – June 30, 1957	Elected in 1951. Re-elected in 1955. Retired.
Patrick D. McGee (Van Nuys)	Republican	July 1, 1957 – June 30, 1961	Elected in 1957. Retired to run for Mayor of Los Angeles.
Thomas D. Shepard (Woodland Hills)	Republican	June 1, 1961 – June 30, 1969	Elected in 1961. Re-elected in 1965. Retired.
Donald D. Lorenzen (Reseda)	Republican	June 1, 1969 – June 30, 1977	Elected in 1969. Re-elected in 1973. Lost re-election.
Joy Picus (Woodland Hills)	Democratic	June 1, 1977 – June 30, 1993	Elected in 1977. Re-elected in 1981. Re-elected in 1985. Re-elected in 1989. Lost re-election.
Laura Chick (Tarzana)	Democratic	June 1, 1993 – June 30, 2001	Elected in 1993. Re-elected in 1997. Retired to run for City Controller.
Dennis Zine (West Hills)	Republican	July 1, 2001 – June 30, 2013	Elected in 2001. Re-elected in 2005. Re-elected in 2009. Retired to run for City Controller.
Dennis Zine (West Hills)	Independent	July 1, 2001 – June 30, 2013	Elected in 2001. Re-elected in 2005. Re-elected in 2009. Retired to run for City Controller.
Bob Blumenfield (Reseda)	Democratic	July 1, 2013 – present	Elected in 2013. Re-elected in 2017. Re-elected in 2022. Term-limited and retired.
Barri Worth Girvan (Woodland Hills)	Democratic	Assuming office on December 14, 2026	Elected in 2026.
