= Joy Picus =

American politician (born 1930)

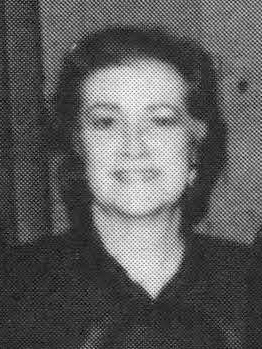
- Picus in 1989

Member of the Los Angeles City Council from the 3rd district
- In office June 1, 1977 – June 30, 1993
- Preceded by: Donald D. Lorenzen
- Succeeded by: Laura Chick

Personal details
- Born: 1930 (age 95–96) Chicago, Illinois
- Party: Democratic
- Education: University of Wisconsin

Joy Picus (born 1930) was an American politician who served as a Los Angeles City Council member for 16 years, from 1977 to 1993, and was a Ms. magazine "Woman of the Year" in 1985.

== Biography ==
Joy Picus is a native of Chicago, Illinois, where her father died shortly after she was born. As a child, she helped her mother manage an apartment building, and at age sixteen she began her political science studies at the University of Wisconsin. She and Gerald Picus, a physicist, were married in Chicago. They lived in Washington, D.C., for a time, then moved to California when Gerald took a job at Hughes Aircraft in 1959. They have three children.

Joy and her husband lived in Woodland Hills in the San Fernando Valley, where she became active in the Parent-Teacher Association and League of Women Voters. She was also president of the Valley branch of the American Association of University Women. She was employed for three years as the Community Relations Director for the Jewish Federation Council, and was a founding member of Temple Aliyah.

She became a feminist after reading Betty Friedan's book The Feminine Mystique in 1964. She said of the book "That was my awakening. Before I didn't know who Susan B. Anthony was." When she became a councilwoman, she sponsored a yearly Susan B. Anthony essay. She had previously sponsored a "Great Expectations" program for high school girls to help them expand their goals.

After her City Council defeat in 1993, she worked to promote "family-friendly" workplaces, women's rights, and recycling. In 2006, she was chair of the Friends of the Griffith Observatory (FOTO).

== City Council ==
=== Elections ===
Picus began her political career in 1973 by challenging the incumbent councilman, Donald D. Lorenzen, in Los Angeles City Council District 3. Lorenzen won in a tight election that demanded a recount; the vote was 27,575 for Lorenzen and 27,027 for Picus. She took on Lorenzen again in 1977, and won by nearly 5,000 votes. Picus said that voters turned against Lorenzen because he forced streetlights upon certain residential districts which resulted in higher taxes. Lorenzen had referred to her as a "wild-eyed environmentalist".

She was first woman to represent the San Fernando Valley on the Los Angeles City Council. At that time, the 3rd District covered the southwest corner of the Valley, including Woodland Hills, Tarzana and parts of Encino, Canoga Park and Reseda.

She was targeted for recall in 1979, a movement that failed for lack of signatures, and she was opposed by the city's police and firefighters' unions, which considered her "anti-labor".

In the 1985 and 1989 elections, Picus was unsuccessfully challenged by Jeanne Nemo, "a Republican activist from Reseda" who was supported by Supervisor Michael Antonovich. Picus recalled that "My opponents were sending partisan mailings to registered Republicans, so I did my own mailing, signed by Maureen Reagan, who's been a friend since we campaigned for the Equal Rights Amendment." Picus won the 1989 vote by a 51.5% majority.

Picus's 16-year incumbency ended in 1993 with her loss to Laura Chick by 17 percentage points.

=== Highlights ===
- In the first year of her service, Picus was said to have "naively" slashed into "City Hall's flock of sacred cows, for example trying to delete funding for the Watts Parade and the Police Band from the city budget. Later, though, she was successful in ending the city practice of "paying for city employees attending veterans' conventions on city time, the full-time salaries of seven police and fire union lobbyists at City Hall and performances of the Police Band and motorcycle drill team on city time."
- Picus became popular among local conservationists, pushing builders to create more open space for parks, supporting transportation projects, and her drive to address waste recycling. She also opposed oil drilling in the Pacific Palisades.
- She was active in developing policies and programs on behalf of working parents and their children. She authored the city's Childcare Policy, "which made Los Angeles one of the first cities in the country to hire a full-time child-care coordinator." She also drove the opening of a child-care center for Civic Center employees in Downtown Los Angeles, financed by the city and federal governments. In 1989, she persuaded the City Council to create preferences in city contracts for companies that offered child-care benefits to their employees.
- Picus was critical of Police Chief Daryl Gates because she did not believe he told the truth when he denied knowing that a member of the Police Department's Intelligence Division "was taking files out of Parker Center and using them for political purposes." She supported a plan to make department heads—including the chief—"subject to review and possible removal at periodic intervals."
- She pushed for a successful 1978 ballot measure that limited veterans' advantage points on Civil Service tests because the practice discriminated against women and non-veterans.
- According to a Los Angeles Times interviewer, Picus was dubbed by some as a "Mary Poppins," from the " 'flighty impression' she sometimes conveys." She replied that her "preparation for political life came from activities primarily with other women," and so she was not "taken as seriously" as men. She emerged, the reporter wrote, "as a woman of enormous ego and drive, with tremendous energy and determination."
- Along with two other council members and the city itself, she was sued by the developers of a proposed office complex on Warner Ridge in Woodland Hills for their efforts in attempting to block the development. The developers won, but "unrelated factors led them to abandon the project."
- A Picus proposal to set up four independent planning commissions to make decisions in different parts of the city was rejected 10-3 by the City Council.

== Ms. magazine ==
Picus was named a "Woman of the Year" by Ms. magazine in 1985 as a result of her successful drive to include an historic "pay equity" plan in the city's collective bargaining agreement with the American Federation of State, County and Municipal Employees. Also known as "comparable worth," the effort refers to upgrading pay rates for jobs that were paid lower wages because they had traditionally been held by women. The magazine credited Picus with "helping bring about a $12 million pay equity agreement between the City of Los Angeles and 3,900 of its employees, most of them women."

== Legacy ==
In 1996 the City Hall South Childcare Center was renamed the Joy Picus Learning Center in her honor.

The Joy Picus Archives covering her years as a Los Angeles City Councilwoman are held at the University Library at California State University, Northridge.

Preceded by Donald Lorenzen	Los Angeles City Council; 3rd District; 1969–77	Succeeded by Laura Chick
