= Donald D. Lorenzen =

American politician (1920–1980)

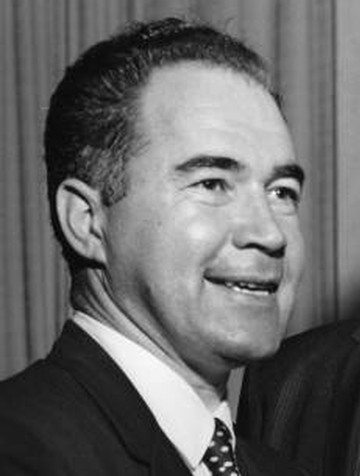
- Lorenzen in 1958

Member of the Los Angeles City Council from the 3rd district
- In office June 1, 1969 – June 30, 1977
- Preceded by: Thomas D. Shepard
- Succeeded by: Joy Picus

Personal details
- Born: January 22, 1920 Elgin, North Dakota, U.S.
- Died: May 15, 1980 (aged 60) Los Angeles, California, U.S.
- Party: Republican
- Spouse: Virginia Laux (m. 1940)
- Children: 2

Donald D. Lorenzen (January 22, 1920 – May 15, 1980) was a San Fernando Valley funeral director who was a member of the Los Angeles City Council from 1969 to 1977.

== Biography ==
Lorenzen was born on January 22, 1920, in Elgin, North Dakota, the son of Dr. and Mrs. Frederick C. Lorenzen. His father was a Danish immigrant and was a medical doctor. The younger Lorenzen attended Elgin High School, Jamestown College, Glendale City College and the California College of Mortuary Science. He and Virginia Laux of San Antonio, Texas, were married on October 2, 1940. They had two sons, David Carl and Jon Robert.

Lorenzen was in the U.S. Air Force during World War II; he and his wife moved to the San Fernando Valley in 1946 and to Reseda in 1952. He operated his own mortuary and founded a bank. His hobbies were flying his light airplane and motion-picture photography.

He died on May 15, 1980, at the age of sixty.

== Public affairs ==
=== Volunteer activities ===
Lorenzen was a president of the Reseda Chamber of Commerce in 1957–58 and of the San Fernando Valley Associated Chambers of Commerce in 1961–62. He was president of the Valley-Wide Better Government Committee and was founder and first chairman of the West Valley Little League. He was president of the San Fernando chapter of Project Hope. He won the Valleywide Fernando Award in 1963.

=== City Council ===
Lorenzen came from second place in the 1969 primary municipal election to win the Los Angeles City Council District 3 seat in the final vote over Howard W. Speer by 32,387 to 23,888. He beat Joy Picus in 1973 in a tight election that demanded a recount; the vote was 27,575 for Lorenzen and 27,027 for Picus. The latter, however, beat Lorenzen in an extremely light vote in 1977, by a vote of 1,148 to 993. Picus said that voters turned against Lorenzen because of the way that the councilman had forced streetlights—and the resulting taxes—upon certain residential districts that did not want them.

=== Positions ===
==== Evergreen Review ====
In 1969 Councilman Lorenzen asked the city's Library Commission to take copies of the avant-garde Evergreen Review magazine off the open shelves of the public library because one of his constituents had read an issue and found "a very dirty story" in it. The commission agreed to ban the magazine from public view for thirty days but make it available to adults on request. Later, it was put back on open shelves for branches that subscribed to it, but public demand had grown so large that there was a waiting list at some libraries. Lorenzen's office, which made another complaint to the commission about photos of nude women in the September 1969 issue had to pay a fine of fifty cents a day for the two overdue copies that it kept out of circulation for two weeks.

==== Secession ====
As chairman of the Valleywide Better Government Committee in 1962, Lorenzen spearheaded an unsuccessful drive for the San Fernando Valley to secede from the city and county of Los Angeles and form its own combined city-county government. Fifteen years later, as a city councilman, Lorenzen said he favored a separate Valley government and independent school district, but described a secession move as "almost impossible."

==== Central Library ====
Lorenzen, a lame-duck member of the City Council in his last month there, helped to push through a plan to upgrade the downtown Los Angeles Central Library instead of building a combined library-retail complex. The plan was developed by architect Charles Luckman, a contributor to Lorenzen's unsuccessful reelection campaign.

Preceded by Thomas D. Shepard	Los Angeles City Council; 3rd District; 1969–77	Succeeded by Joy Picus
