= Thomas D. Shepard =

American politician (1925–2012)

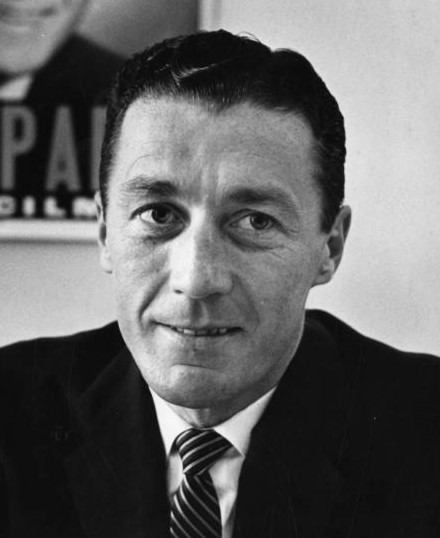
- Shepard in 1961

Member of the Los Angeles City Council from the 3rd district
- In office June 1, 1961 – 1967
- Preceded by: Patrick D. McGee
- Succeeded by: Donald D. Lorenzen

Personal details
- Born: December 19, 1925 Springfield, Ohio, U.S.
- Died: September 8, 2012 (aged 86) Wofford Heights, California, U.S.
- Party: Republican
- Spouse: Carolyn Shepard
- Children: 4

Thomas Donald Shepard (December 19, 1925 – September 8, 2012) was an American politician who served as a member of the Los Angeles City Council between 1961 and 1967. He left office when he was convicted of receiving a bribe, and he served time in state prison.

== Life and career ==
Shepard was born in Springfield, Ohio, on December 19, 1925, and was an infantry sergeant in France and Germany during World War II. He moved to Los Angeles about 1949 after attending Ohio Wesleyan University, Ohio State University and Wittenberg College, all in Ohio; he received a bachelor's degree in social science from Wittenberg. Shepard did graduate work in economics at UCLA. From 1954 to 1957 he was field secretary for City Councilman Robert M. Wilkinson and for Councilman Patrick D. McGee in 1959–60. He also was field secretary for Mayor Norris Poulson.

=== Elections ===
Shepard was elected to a four-year term in the 3rd District in June 1961, succeeding his boss, Patrick D. McGee. In that era, the 3rd District included West Hollywood and contiguous territory and, on the other side of the Santa Monica Mountains, a portion of the San Fernando Valley, including Tarzana and Woodland Hills. He was reelected in 1965.

=== Positions ===
Shepard became known for his opposition to striptease shows in suburban areas and once brought to a City Council meeting a magazine, which he kept in a manila envelope, "with many photographs of youngsters, completely nude, disporting themselves in a wooded area." He told the council in 1964:

The rawest type of lascivious and lustful paperback magazines may be obtained from racks in almost any drug or liquor store and in many markets in the Valley, with much of the offensive material which features teenage nudism disappearing rapidly from the shelves into the hands of impressionable youngsters.

In 1967 he warned of "reports that an army of hippies proposes to visit Los Angeles during the summer and establish headquarters in the city parks" and said he would seek municipal legislation to prevent "commandeering" of the parks by such intruders.

After three public meetings the same year, an eight-member City Council committee "cleared" Shepard and entertainer Art Linkletter of charges that they were linked in a scheme to influence city purchase of the "financially troubled" Valley Music Theater in Woodland Hills.

In December 1967, he announced that he would quit the council early in order to enter the import-export business, basing his decision on the financial need for his family.

=== Indictment and trial ===
Shepard and former Recreation and Parks Commissioner Mel Pierson were indicted by a grand jury in September 1968 on charges of bribery and conspiracy in the rezoning of land in the San Fernando Valley. Shepard's trial ended in acquittal on one charge and a hung jury on another. On the advice of his attorney, John La Follette, he submitted the transcript of the latter case to a judge, who found him guilty. A new lawyer, Phill Silver, appealed and won a new trial for Shepard. He was convicted, in November 1969, of a bribery charge and was sentenced to state prison for a 1-14-year term by Superior Judge Pearce Young, who noted that the power to rezone was the power to create great wealth and using that power wrongfully "is just as bad as stealing public money."

== Post-council ==
In May 1971, Shepard became general manager and vice president of Ries Biological of Los Angeles, which dealt in drugs and medical supplies and devices. He served a 15-month sentence at the Chino Institution for Men, and after his release he was hired by City Council Member Ernani Bernardi in January 1975 "as a project assistant under the federal government's emergency jobs program." He was still working there in 1979.

== Personal life and death ==
Shepard and his wife, Carolyn, lived in Woodland Hills, Los Angeles. They had four childre: Mike, Susan, Connie and Barbara. He died in Wofford Heights, California, on September 8, 2012, at the age of 86.

Preceded by Patrick D. McGee	Los Angeles City Council; 3rd District; 1961–1967	Succeeded by Donald Lorenzen
Preceded by Office established	President Pro Tempore of the Los Angeles City Council; 1965-1967	Succeeded by John S. Gibson Jr.
