= Elgin, North Dakota =

- City
- Location of Elgin, North Dakota
- Coordinates: 46°24′05″N 101°50′51″W
- Country: United States
- State: North Dakota
- County: Grant
- Founded: 1910

Area
  - Total: 0.82 sq mi (2.13 km^{2})
  - Land: 0.82 sq mi (2.13 km^{2})
  - Water: 0 sq mi (0.00 km^{2})
- Elevation: 2,352 ft (717 m)

Population (2020)
  - Total: 543
  - Estimate (2024): 524
  - Density: 660.2/sq mi (254.89/km^{2})
- Time zone: UTC-7 (Mountain (MST))
  - Summer (DST): UTC-6 (MDT)
- ZIP code: 58533
- Area code: 701
- FIPS code: 38-23020
- GNIS feature ID: 1036020
- Website: www.elginnorthdakota.com

Elgin is a city in Grant County, North Dakota, United States. The population was 543 at the 2020 census.

== History ==
Elgin was platted in 1910 when the railroad was extended to that point. The town was originally known as Shanley, but when the Northern Pacific Railroad came through town, they objected to the name as it was too similar to Stanley (the seat of Mountrail County), so the citizens were asked to choose a new name. At one point, one committee member checked the time on his Elgin pocket watch and suggested the brand name, which was found to be acceptable. A post office has been in operation at Elgin since 1910.

On July 4, 1978, an F4 tornado struck Elgin, causing five deaths and 35 injuries. The ninth deadliest storm in North Dakota's recorded history, and the deadliest Independence Day tornado nationwide, Elgin's Independence Day Tornado crumpled the town's water tower.

== Geography ==
According to the United States Census Bureau, the city has a total area of 1.05 square miles (2.72 km^{2}), all land.

=== Climate ===
This climatic region is typified by large seasonal temperature differences, with warm to hot (and often humid) summers and cold (sometimes severely cold) winters. According to the Köppen Climate Classification system, Elgin has a humid continental climate, abbreviated "Dfb" on climate maps.

== Demographics ==
Historical population
Census	Pop.	Note	%±
1920	429		—
1930	505		17.7%
1940	583		15.4%
1950	882		51.3%
1960	944		7.0%
1970	839		−11.1%
1980	930		10.8%
1990	765		−17.7%
2000	659		−13.9%
2010	642		−2.6%
2020	543		−15.4%
2024 (est.)	524		−3.5%
U.S. Decennial Census; 2020 Census

=== 2010 census ===
As of the census of 2010, there were 642 people, 339 households, and 167 families residing in the city. The population density was 611.4 inhabitants per square mile (236.1/km^{2}). There were 416 housing units at an average density of 396.2 per square mile (153.0/km^{2}). The racial makeup of the city was 98.3% White, 0.9% Native American, 0.2% from other races, and 0.6% from two or more races. Hispanic or Latino of any race were 0.2% of the population.

There were 339 households, of which 16.5% had children under the age of 18 living with them, 41.3% were married couples living together, 5.0% had a female householder with no husband present, 2.9% had a male householder with no wife present, and 50.7% were non-families. 49.6% of all households were made up of individuals, and 32.1% had someone living alone who was 65 years of age or older. The average household size was 1.82 and the average family size was 2.59.

The median age in the city was 57.4 years. 17% of residents were under the age of 18; 2.8% were between the ages of 18 and 24; 14.6% were from 25 to 44; 30% were from 45 to 64; and 35.5% were 65 years of age or older. The gender makeup of the city was 45.5% male and 54.5% female.

=== 2000 census ===
As of the census of 2000, there were 659 people, 316 households, and 170 families residing in the city. The population density was 814.5 inhabitants per square mile (314.5/km^{2}). There were 379 housing units at an average density of 468.5 per square mile (180.9/km^{2}). The racial makeup of the city was 97.12% White, 1.06% Native American, 0.30% Asian, 0.76% from other races, and 0.76% from two or more races. Hispanic or Latino of any race were 0.76% of the population.

There were 316 households, out of which 18.7% had children under the age of 18 living with them, 48.7% were married couples living together, 3.5% had a female householder with no husband present, and 45.9% were non-families. 44.9% of all households were made up of individuals, and 25.0% had someone living alone who was 65 years of age or older. The average household size was 1.91 and the average family size was 2.65.

In the city, the population was spread out, with 17.0% under the age of 18, 3.5% from 18 to 24, 16.4% from 25 to 44, 24.6% from 45 to 64, and 38.5% who were 65 years of age or older. The median age was 56 years. For every 100 females, there were 93.3 males. For every 100 females age 18 and over, there were 86.7 males.

The median income for a household in the city was $22,391, and the median income for a family was $30,972. Males had a median income of $28,750 versus $15,417 for females. The per capita income for the city was $18,080. About 8.8% of families and 14.7% of the population were below the poverty line, including 16.9% of those under age 18 and 19.3% of those age 65 or over.

== Notable person ==
- Donald D. Lorenzen (1920–80), member of the Los Angeles City Council (1969–1977)
