= 1961 Los Angeles mayoral election =

- April 4, 1961 and May 31, 1961

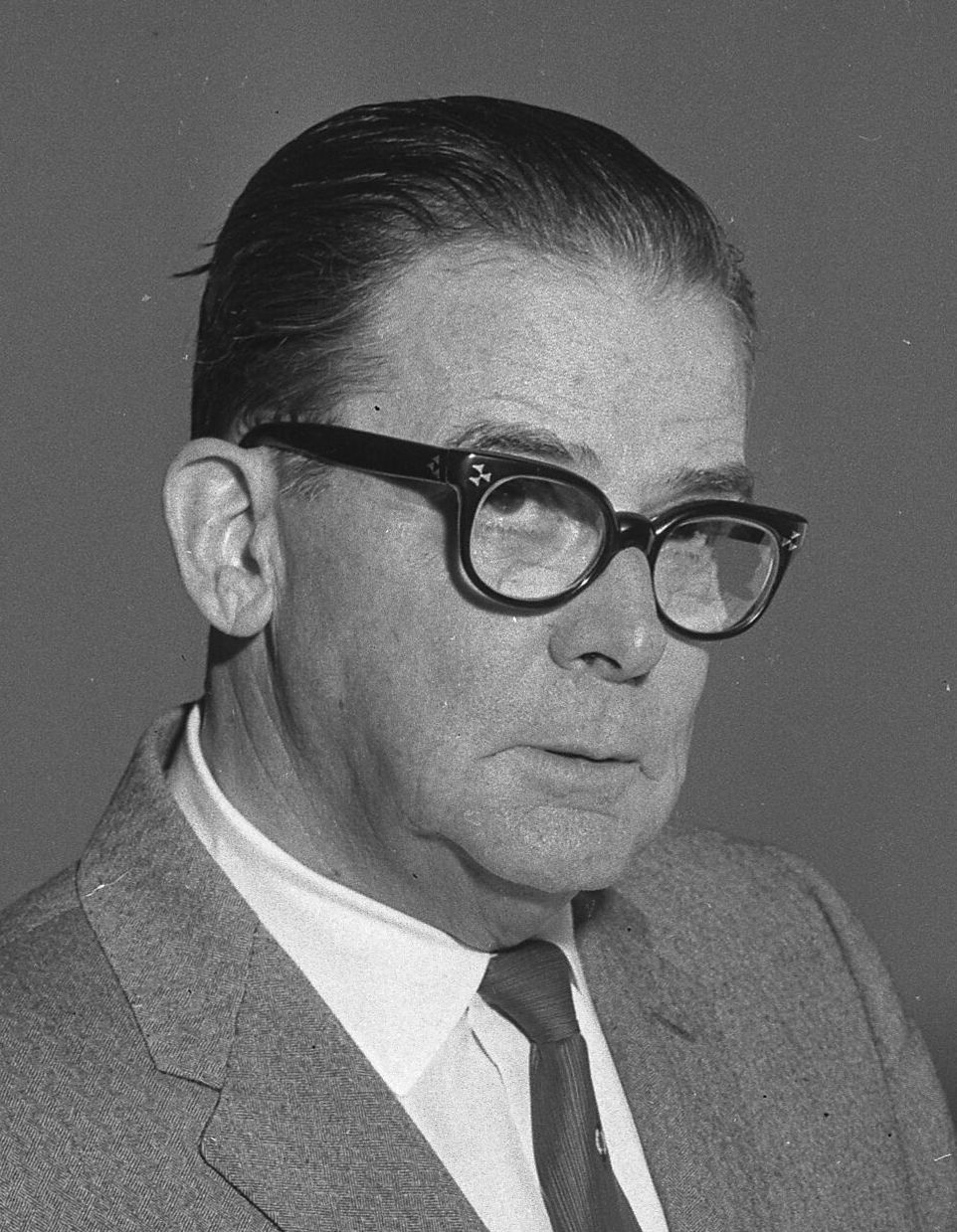

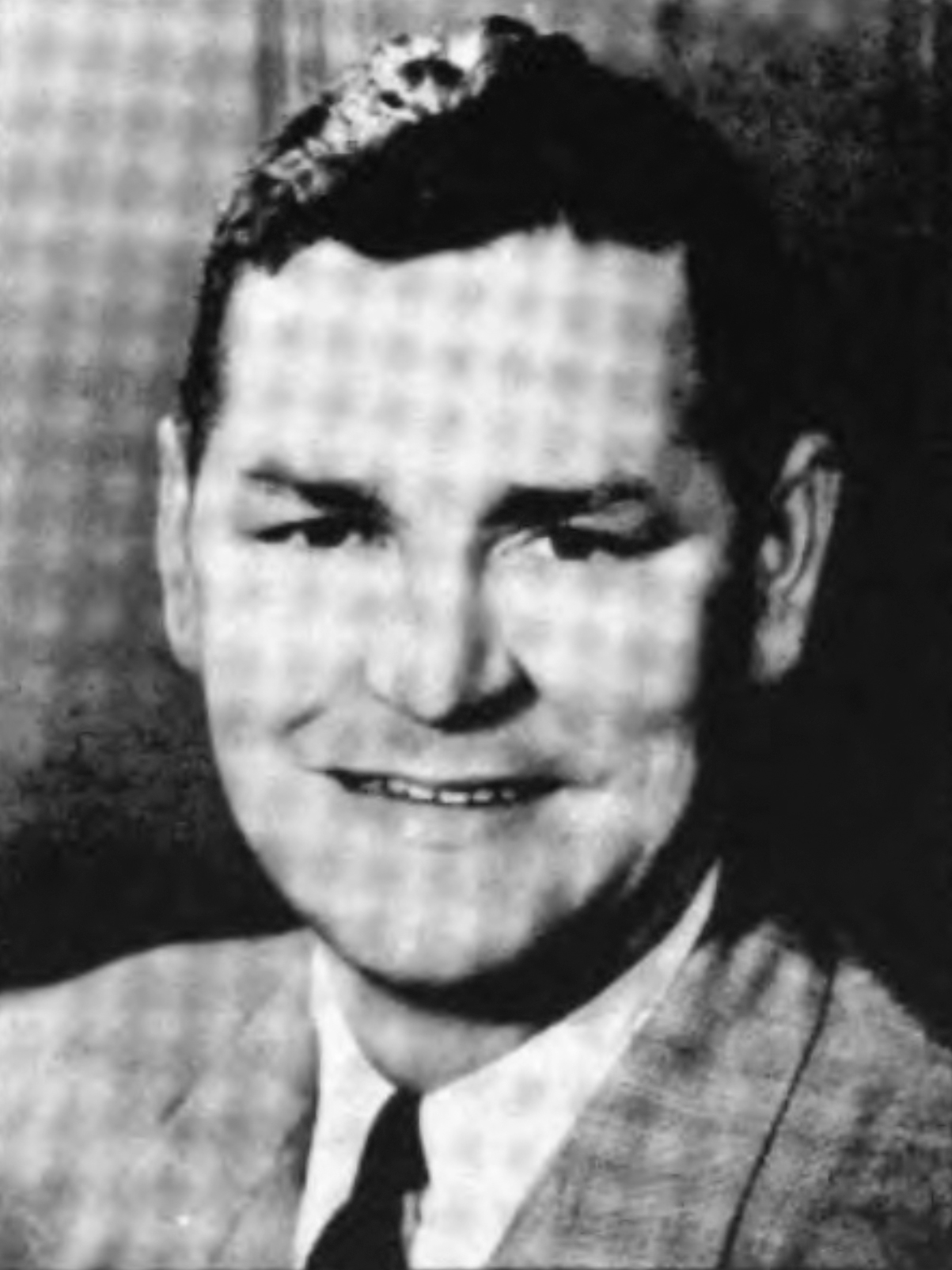
Candidate	Sam Yorty	Norris Poulson	Patrick D. McGee
First round	122,478; 27.10%	179,273; 39.67%	115,635; 25.59%
Runoff	275,249; 51.45%	259,760; 48.55%	Eliminated
Mayor before election
Norris Poulson
Elected Mayor
Sam Yorty

The 1961 Los Angeles mayoral election took place on April 4, 1961, with a runoff election on May 31, 1961. Incumbent Norris Poulson was defeated by Sam Yorty, a former U.S. Representative.

Municipal elections in California, including Mayor of Los Angeles, are officially nonpartisan; candidates' party affiliations do not appear on the ballot.

== Candidates ==
- William Carpenter
- Oscar G. Coover
- Wallace J. Lauria
- Howard M. Kessler
- Patrick D. McGee, member of the Los Angeles City Council and former state assemblyman
- M. Garet Miller
- Norris Poulson, incumbent mayor since 1953
- Robert C. Ronstadt
- Sam Yorty, former U.S. representative and Democratic nominee for U.S. Senate in 1954

== Campaign ==
Poulson ran for re-election for a third term after a movement to "draft" Poulson for a next term. In January 1961, former U.S. Representative Sam Yorty entered the race, criticizing Poulson for his handling of smog and taxes in Los Angeles. Patrick D. McGee, a member of the Los Angeles City Council, also announced his run for mayor. Both Yorty and McGee had talked about rumors surrounding Poulson that said that he had throat cancer, which Poulson denied. In the primary election, Poulson and Yorty advanced to the runoff election. In the runoff, Yorty defeated Poulson in the election, which some newspapers said was because Poulson "could not make a good public appearance."

== Results ==
=== Primary election ===
Los Angeles mayoral primary election, April 4, 1961
Candidate	Votes	%
Norris Poulson (incumbent)	179,273	39.67
Sam Yorty	122,478	27.10
Patrick D. McGee	115,635	25.59
Robert C. Ronstadt	11,340	2.51
Howard M. Kessler	7,558	1.67
William Carpenter	7,267	1.61
M. Garet Miller	4,640	1.03
Oscar G. Coover	2,141	0.47
Wallace J. Lauria	1,598	0.35
Total votes	451,930	100.00

=== General election ===
Los Angeles mayoral general election, May 31, 1961
Candidate	Votes	%
Sam Yorty	275,249	51.45
Norris Poulson (incumbent)	259,760	48.55
Total votes	535,009	100.00
