= Patrick D. McGee =

American politician (1916–1970)

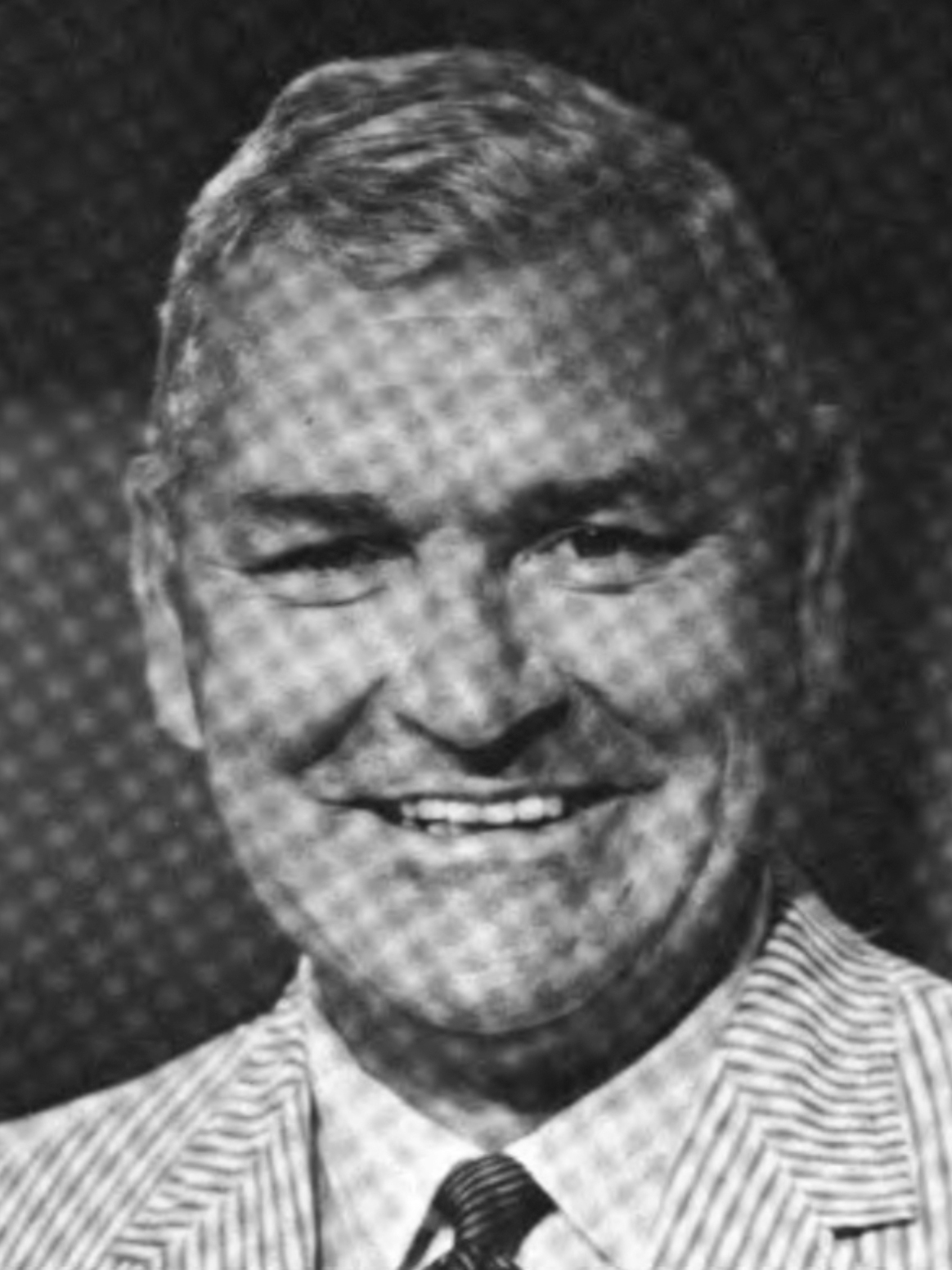
- Official portrait, 1967

Member of the California State Assembly from the 64th district
- In office January 2, 1967 – May 30, 1970
- Preceded by: Lou Cusanovich
- Succeeded by: Bob Cline
- In office January 8, 1951 – August 21, 1957
- Preceded by: Sam Yorty
- Succeeded by: Lou Cusanovich

Member of the Los Angeles City Council from the 3rd district
- In office July 1, 1957 – June 30, 1961
- Preceded by: Robert M. Wilkinson
- Succeeded by: Thomas D. Shepard

Personal details
- Born: March 5, 1916 Osceola, Ontario, Canada
- Died: May 30, 1970 (aged 54) San Francisco, California
- Party: Republican
- Spouse: Eleanor Grace Cornehl (m. 1944)
- Children: Thomas D'Arcy
- Education: Notre Dame University

Military service
- Branch/service: Royal Canadian Air Force; United States Navy
- Battles/wars: World War II

Patrick D'Arcy McGee (March 5, 1916 – May 30, 1970) was a Republican member of the California State Assembly for the 64th district from 1950 to 1957 and from 1966 until his death in 1970. He was a Los Angeles City Council member from 1957 to 1961, when he opposed the city's agreement to bring the Dodgers baseball team to a new stadium in Chavez Ravine.

== Biography ==
McGee was born on March 5, 1916, near Osceola, Ontario, Canada, and moved to Detroit, Michigan. as a child. He attended Notre Dame University until he joined the Royal Canadian Air Force in 1940 and later the U.S. Navy during World War II. He received a Distinguished Flying Cross (United Kingdom) for bravery. He flew many bombing missions over Dresden and other German cities, and won the DFC for bringing his B17 to a safe landing in a field in Dover, GB with a flaming hole in the undercarriage and his co-pilot dead. After the war, he earned a degree at Harvard Law School. He next became a research attorney with the District Court of Appeal in Los Angeles.

At the time of his death, McGee resided in West Van Nuys, California with his wife Eleanor and their son D'Arcy McGee.

He was a golfer and a chess player.

He died in San Francisco on May 27, 1970; he had spine cancer. The rosary was recited and a requiem mass was celebrated at St. Catherine of Siena Catholic Church in Reseda.

== Public life ==
=== Elections ===
==== State ====
McGee ran for the 64th Assembly District seat in election years 1950 through 1956 and won all four times. He sought the 38th District seat in the State Senate in 1962, but lost. He was reelected in the 64th Assembly District in 1966 and 1968,

==== City ====
McGee gave up his Assembly position to run in the conservatively oriented Los Angeles City Council District 3 in the West San Fernando Valley, which included Woodland Hills, Encino, Tarzana, Northridge, Reseda and Canoga Park. He won an easy victory in the 1957 primary for a four-year term.

In 1961, however, he did not campaign for reelection but instead ran for mayor; he came in third after Norris Poulson and Sam Yorty, who then met in a runoff election.

=== State Assembly ===
As an Assembly member, McGee was active in a bid to obtain legislation to establish a rapid transit authority in the Los Angeles area and was also in "the thick of the fight to get Feather River water" for Southern California.

=== City Council ===
Conflict, 1957. McGee occasioned controversy when he announced that he would keep his State Assembly seat while serving as a city councilman because, he said, he could then work with fellow state legislators on a solution to a squabble between Northern and Southern California over water rights. He said he would accept no salary from the state. Nevertheless, Attorney-General Pat Brown ruled that McGee's stand presented "a distinct conflict of interests" but that only the Assembly could eject McGee. City Controller Dan O. Hoye said he would refuse to give McGee his check for July 1957 because of the situation. On August 1 McGee got neither his pay of $1,000 a month from the city nor his $500-a-month salary from the state because he "presumably" was one of 119 state employees who that month received pay envelopes "mailed out by mistake with nothing in them." McGee resigned from the Assembly near the end of the month.

Dodgers, 1958. McGee was one of the three council members—Harold A. Henry and John C. Holland being the others—who voted in 1958 against a proposal to turn Chavez Ravine over to the Brooklyn Dodgers for use as a baseball stadium. Calling the proposed pact with the Dodgers stupid, immoral and misleading, he claimed the contract:

1. Did not provide for revenue for the city.
2. Contained an "illegal and immoral" provision to divide any future oil revenues between the city and a trust fund to be spent for a Dodger youth program, which represented an agreement to "spend public money for private individuals."
3. Failed to specify that if the land were not used for baseball if would revert to the city.
4. Bound the city to spend up to $2 million to improve the land before it is turned over to the Dodgers.
5. Was worded so the Dodgers could violate the agreement but still keep title to the land.

Trampolines, 1960. He urged the city Health Department to study the health effects of the popular trampoline centers then opening up in the city.

Boroughs, 1960. He urged the establishment of a borough system to provide more local representation for the San Fernando Valley.

Preceded by Robert M. Wilkinson	Los Angeles City Council; 3rd District; 1957–61	Succeeded by Thomas D. Shepard
