= Nick Patsaouras =

Greek-American engineer, urban planner, and public official

Nikolas Patsaouras
- Born: 1943 (age 82–83); Greece
- Other name: Nick
- Education: California State University, Northridge (Engineering)
- Occupations: Engineer, Urban Planner, Public Official

Nikolas "Nick" Patsaouras (born 1943) is a Greek-American engineer, urban planner, and public official in Los Angeles, California.

== Background and education ==
Patsaouras was born in Greece, and is an immigrant to the United States. He is an engineering graduate of California State University Northridge.

== Career ==
Patsaouras has served as a member and board president of the Southern California Rapid Transit District, and on the board of Los Angeles Metro, where he was a proponent of bus transit. Patsaouras Transit Plaza at the MTA Gateway Center is named in his honor. He also served on the City of Los Angeles Board of Zoning Appeals and is the Past President of the Board of Water and Power Commissioners with oversight of the Los Angeles Department of Water and Power.

Patsaouras has also been Chair of the Oversight Committee for the UCLA/Harbor Medical Center $400 million addition of ICU/CCU/Trauma Centers. In addition, Patsaouras has been Chair of the Project Advisory Committee for the construction of the $440 Million Los Angeles Police Administration Building.

Patsaouras announced on October 27, 2008, that he would be a candidate to succeed Laura Chick as City Controller of the City of Los Angeles in the 2009 municipal election. He lost to Wendy Greuel, a former member of the Los Angeles City Council. Patsaouras was a candidate for Mayor of Los Angeles in 1993.

Patsaouras is an Electrical Engineer, licensed in the State of California.
