= Walter J. Wren =

American politician

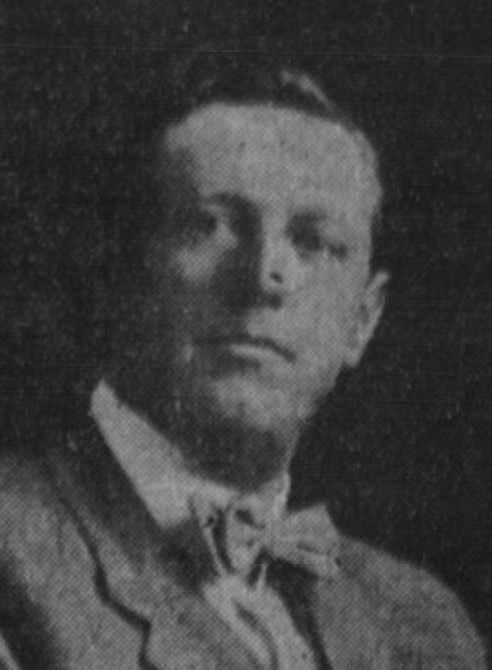
- Wren in 1906

Member of the Los Angeles City Council for the 3rd ward
- In office December 13, 1906 – December 10, 1909
- Preceded by: Sidney W. Hiller
- Succeeded by: District eliminated

Personal details
- Born: 1873
- Died: 1919 (aged 45–46)

Walter J. Wren (ca. 1873–1919) was an insurance man who was a member of the Los Angeles City Council in 1906-09.

== Personal ==
Wren came with his parents to Los Angeles when he was 12 years old and never traveled farther than thirty miles from that city in his lifetime. He was educated in Santa Monica, California, or Los Angeles city schools. He married Jane I. Graham of Pasadena, California, in 1902 and on their fifteenth wedding anniversary they had a daughter, Gene Ethelyn, or Bebe.

On July 12, 1919, Wren died in his home, 2810 West 7th Street, in the Westlake neighborhood of "complications following an attack of influenza." He was survived by his wife and daughter; a sister, Beatrice Wren Norman; his father, Walter H. Wren; and his mother, Catherine Wren. Interment was at Santa Monica Cemetery.

== Political and business ==
Wren was appointed to the Los Angeles Fire Commission in 1905 by Mayor Owen McAleer, and in 1906 he was elected to a three-year term as city councilman from the 3rd Ward (electoral subdivision). In politics, Wren was a Republican, but he won his council election as a nominee of the Non-Partisan City Central Committee.

He was a partner with Egbert Van Allen in the insurance business.
