= Laura Chick =

American politician

Laura N. Chick
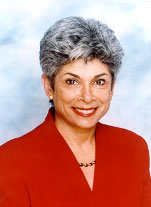
- Official portrait, 2001

17th City Controller of Los Angeles
- In office July 1, 2001 – April 27, 2009
- Preceded by: Rick Tuttle
- Succeeded by: Wendy Greuel

Member of the Los Angeles City Council from the 3rd district
- In office July 1, 1993 – July 1, 2001
- Preceded by: Joy Picus
- Succeeded by: Dennis Zine

Personal details
- Born: 1944 (age 81–82) New York
- Party: Democratic

Laura N. Chick (born 1944) is an American politician. She served as Los Angeles City Controller from 2001 to 2009.

Chick served as a council member for Los Angeles City's Third District from 1993 to 2001, after which she became the first woman to hold citywide office as the Los Angeles City Controller. Known for her bluntness, Chick released over 170 audits and reports during her tenure, including one that exposed a backlog of untested DNA rape kits at the Los Angeles Police Department.

In 2009, Governor Arnold Schwarzenegger appointed her as California Inspector General to oversee the use of federal funds from the American Recovery and Reinvestment Act. Her role ended when the office was eliminated in December 2010. Before entering politics, Chick had been a stay-at-home mother, managed a family-owned retail business, and worked as a social worker.

== Los Angeles City Elected Offices ==
Chick was elected to the Los Angeles City Council from the Third District (Woodland Hills, Tarzana, Reseda, West Hills, Winnetka and Canoga Park), in 1993 and served two terms, until 2001. She defeated Joy Picus, who had served since 1977, and for whom Chick had worked as a political aide.

In 2001, Chick was elected Los Angeles City Controller, becoming the first woman to hold citywide office in Los Angeles. As Controller, she was the Chief Auditor and Chief Accountant of the City. In her nearly eight years in this office, Chick released over 170 audits and reports, many of which focused on problems within city government.

In 2006, Los Angeles Magazine named Laura Chick one of the most influential people in the City. The Los Angeles Daily News editorialized, "…as City Controller, she's often been downtown's lone champion of good government." A Los Angeles Business Journal feature said, "Los Angeles City Controller Laura Chick has emerged as a central voice in the ongoing debate over how the City handles its contracts." In a May 2004 feature article, Los Angeles Magazine states, "Where others couch and evade, she is Ms. Blunt."

One of her last audits to be released as City Controller exposed a backlog of thousands of untested DNA rape kits at the Los Angeles Police Department. The attention her report garnered resulted in City officials making the problem a priority. Her work won her the prestigious ProPublica Prize for Investigative Governance. Chick left the City Controller's position due to term limits in 2009.

Her experience includes managing a family-owned retail business. Laura first entered elected office in 1993 when she defeated a 16-year incumbent for a seat on the Los Angeles City Council. Seven months after taking office her district was devastated by the 1994 Northridge earthquake. Chick focused on turning the area into a redevelopment zone.

== California Inspector General ==
Shortly after President Obama signed the American Recovery and Reinvestment Act of 2009, Governor Arnold Schwarzenegger appointed Laura Chick to act as Inspector General, to provide oversight to the proper use of federal funds. Chick resigned her City Controller post before the end of her term to accept the state position.

The Sacramento Bee heralded Chick's arrival in the Capitol with the headline, "Misuse stimulus cash - you'll answer to her".

Chick took up the state's challenge of overseeing the massive expenditure of American Recovery funds though her Office was given very little resources. With a handful of auditors borrowed from other state departments, she scrutinized local agencies across the state. Chick released nearly 30 reports uncovering misspent stimulus funds totaling millions.

Chick's tenure in this role ended when the Office of the Inspector General was eliminated by Governor Jerry Brown in December 2010.

== Personal life ==
Before entering elective office at the age of 49, Chick had already been a stay-at-home mom, manager of a family-owned retail business, and social worker. She graduated from Beverly Hills High School in 1962, and received her Bachelor's Degree in History from UCLA as well as a Master's degree in Social Work from USC Suzanne Dworak-Peck School of Social Work. Chick moved to Kensington, California, near Berkeley, in 2011 where she still lives. Chick is Jewish. In September 2022, Chick called Controller candidate Kenneth Mejia an extremist who was unfit for office. Mejia was later elected that November.

Political offices
Preceded by Rick Tuttle	City Controller of Los Angeles, California; July 1, 2001 – July 1, 2009	Succeeded by Wendy Greuel
Preceded by Joy Picus	Member of the Los Angeles City Council from the 3rd district 1993–2001	Succeeded by Dennis Zine
