= Mark Matthew Herd =

American libertarian activist

Councilman for Westwood Neighborhood Council
- In office 2010–2014

Personal details
- Born: Mark Matthew Herd; May 29, 1963 (age 63) Santa Monica, California, U.S.
- Party: Libertarian
- Education: University of Arizona
- Website: Official website

Mark Matthew Herd (born May 29, 1963) is an American community organizer and activist. A member of the Libertarian Party, Herd has run for office three times, most notably as the party's 2016 U.S. Senate nominee.

== Early life ==
A native of Los Angeles, Herd is a graduate of University High School and the University of Arizona, where he got his bachelor's degree in economics.

== Politics ==
In 2010, Herd started the Westwood Neighborhood Council, and served 4 years as its councilman.

In 2014, Herd was the Libertarian candidate for California's 33rd congressional district in 2014.

Herd was also the Libertarian candidate for Senator of California in 2016.

In 2017, Herd ran against Paul Koretz and Jesse Max Creed for Los Angeles City Council to represent District 5 .

Herd is the founder and Co-Chairman of the Venice Beach Libertarian Club and Executive Producer of the Libertarian Broadcast Network.
