= Jan Perry =

American politician

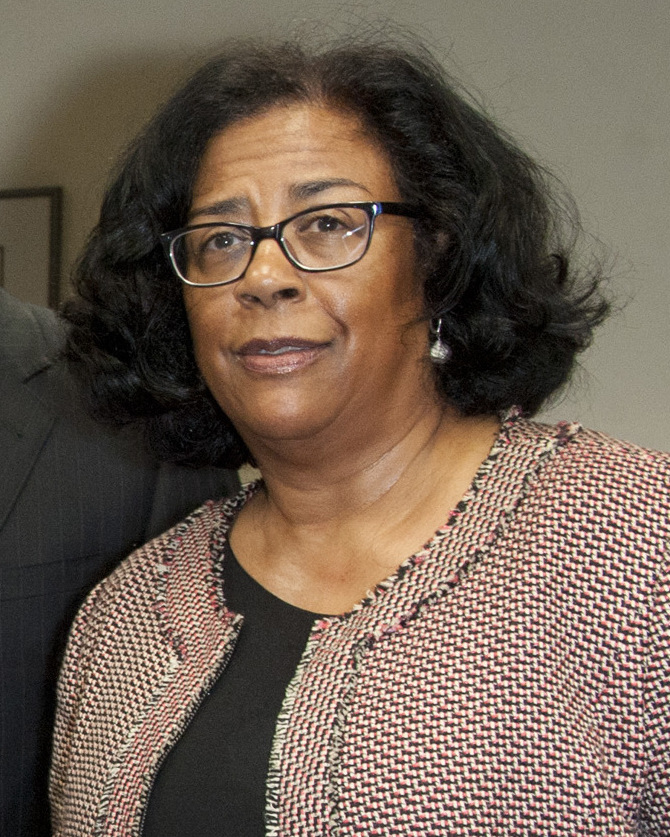
- Perry in 2014

President Pro Tempore of the Los Angeles City Council
- In office July 7, 2009 – November 4, 2011
- Preceded by: Wendy Greuel
- Succeeded by: Ed Reyes

Assistant President Pro Tempore of the Los Angeles City Council
- In office January 1, 2006 – July 28, 2009
- Preceded by: Tony Cárdenas
- Succeeded by: Dennis Zine

Member of the Los Angeles City Council from the 9th district
- In office July 1, 2001 – July 1, 2013
- Preceded by: Rita Walters
- Succeeded by: Curren Price

Personal details
- Born: June 8, 1955 (age 71) Cleveland, Ohio, U.S.
- Party: Democratic
- Education: University of Southern California (BA, MPA)
- Website: Campaign website

Jan C. Perry (born June 8, 1955) is an American politician from California. A member of the Democratic Party, she served on the Los Angeles City Council from 2001 to 2013.

== Career ==
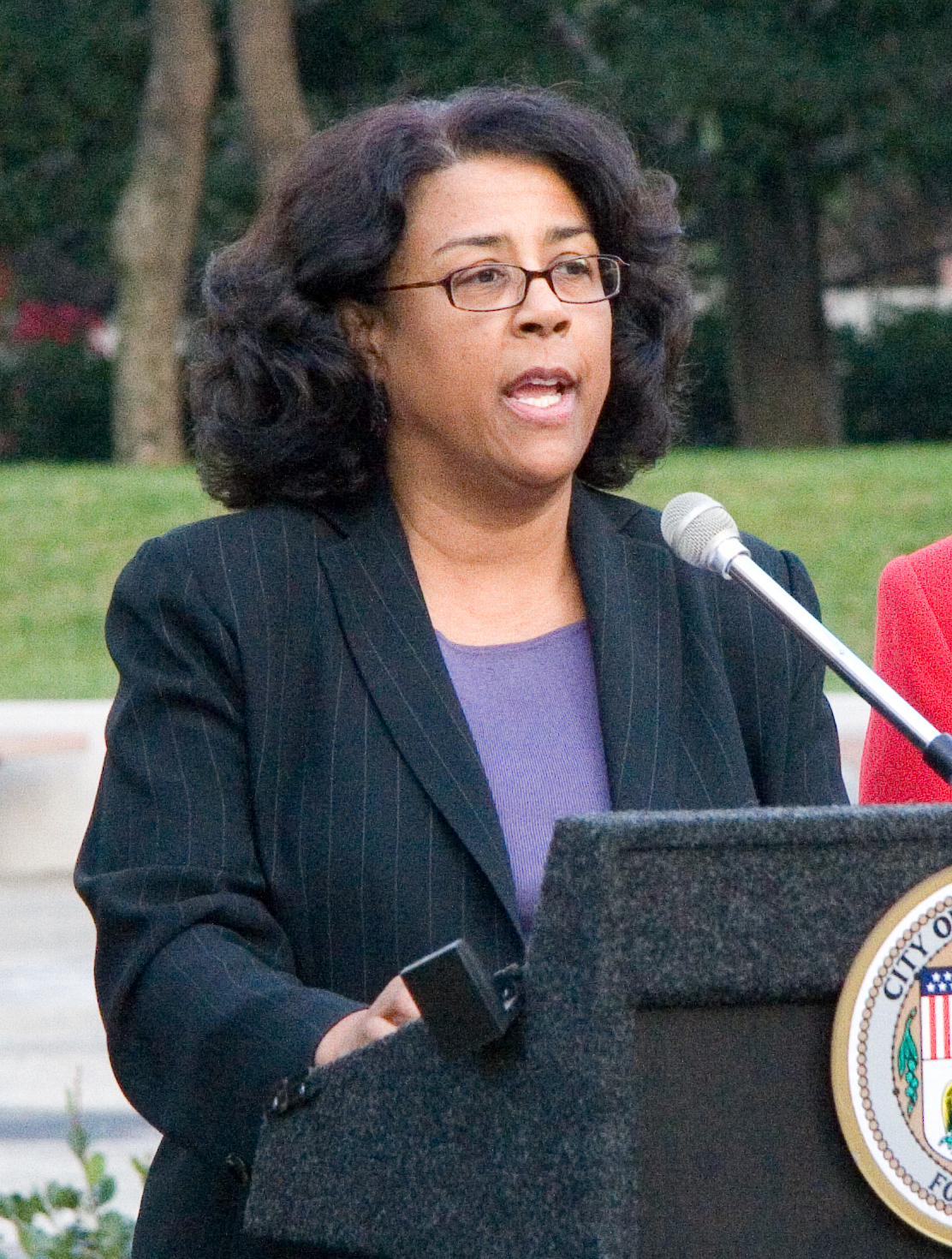
Perry speaking in 2006.

Perry represented the Ninth District on the Los Angeles City Council from 2001 to 2013 and was president pro tempore of the Council. She is a member of the Democratic Party. She was a candidate for mayor of Los Angeles in 2013.

Perry was elected to office in 2001 to succeed Councilwoman Rita Walters, whom she had served as chief of staff. Re-elected in 2005 and 2009, Perry left office in 2013.

She helped enact restrictions on fast food restaurants in her district. As part of a larger campaign to combat high obesity rates, Perry has also funded public parks to promote outdoor activity and supported incentives to encourage more grocery stores to open within her district.

Jan Perry was the general manager of the Los Angeles Economic & Workforce Development Department (EWDD) of the City of Los Angeles. Initially appointed as Interim General Manager of the Los Angeles Economic & Workforce Development Department (EWDD) in July 2013 by Los Angeles Mayor Eric Garcetti, her former rival. She was named general manager in November 2013. She stepped down at the end of 2018.

In 2022, Jan Perry ran for Congress in California's 37th congressional district to succeed Karen Bass, who was elected mayor of Los Angeles. Perry was defeated by Sydney Kamlager.

=== Jan Perry Wetlands ===
A 9-acre underutilized bus maintenance yard was developed into a South Los Angeles storm water wetlands and community park.

The Los Angeles City Council voted to rename the park "The Jan Perry Wetlands" for her work with the project.

The project includes storm water pre-treatment, storm water treatment wetlands of approximately 4 acres, open park space, and a parking lot sloped to drain into the wetlands; it also provides for wildlife viewing and educational opportunities. The project was completed in December 2011.

The project is funded by Los Angeles Proposition "O", 2004 Bond Measure, State and local grant money and funds from the EPA and the Metropolitan Transportation Authority were also used.

== Personal life ==
Perry is a convert to Judaism. She had an Orthodox conversion in the 1980s, studying under Rabbi Chaim Seidler-Feller of UCLA's Hillel.

Political offices
Preceded by Rita Walters	Member of the Los Angeles City Council from the 9th district 2001–2013	Succeeded by Curren Price
Preceded by Wendy Greuel	President pro tempore of the Los Angeles City Council; 2009–2011	Succeeded by Ed Reyes
Preceded by Tony Cárdenas	Assistant President Pro Tempore of the Los Angeles City Council; 2006–2009	Succeeded by Dennis Zine
