= Ron Galperin =

Los Angeles City Controller

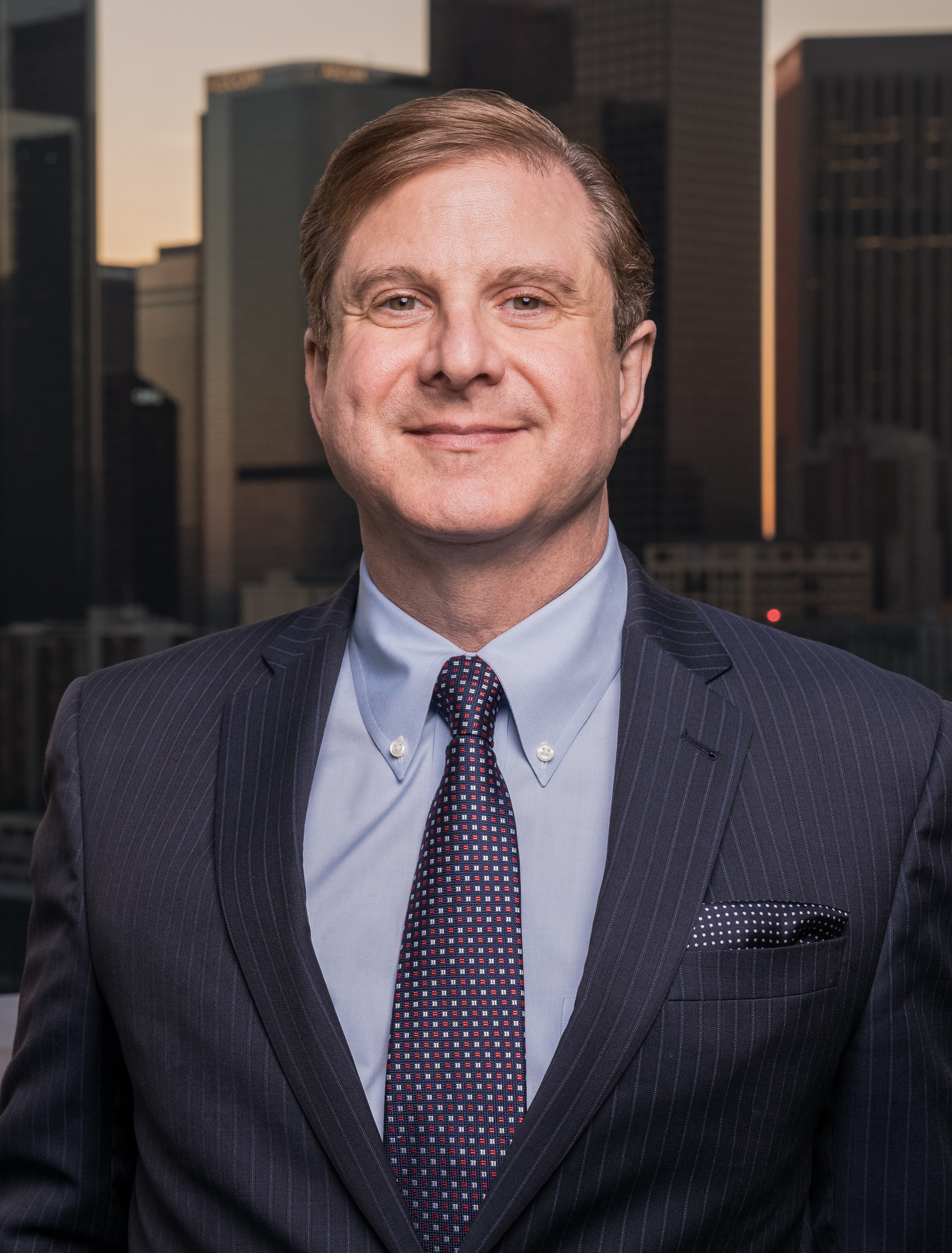
- Official portrait, 2018

19th City Controller of Los Angeles
- In office July 1, 2013 – December 9, 2022
- Mayor: Eric Garcetti
- Preceded by: Wendy Greuel
- Succeeded by: Kenneth Mejia

Personal details
- Born: Ron Shalom Galperin; August 1, 1963 (age 62)
- Party: Democratic
- Spouse: Zach Shapiro
- Education: Washington University in St. Louis (BA); Loyola Marymount University (JD)
- Website: www.lacontroller.org

Ron Shalom Galperin (born August 1, 1963) is an American politician who served as the 19th Los Angeles city controller from 2013 to 2022. He took office on July 1, 2013, and won re-election in 2017. A member of the Democratic Party, Galperin is the first openly gay official and first neighborhood councilmember to be elected to citywide office in Los Angeles.

Galperin was elected Los Angeles City Controller in 2013, and re-elected in 2017. He was a candidate in the 2022 California State Controller election. In 2024, Galperin was a fellow at the USC Center for the Political Future.

== Education ==
Galperin earned a Bachelor of Arts degree in English, business, and political science from the Washington University in St. Louis and his Juris Doctor from Loyola Law School. He was admitted to the State Bar of California on December 12, 1994. In 2018, Galperin completed Harvard University's John F. Kennedy School of Government program for Senior Executives in State and Local Government as a David Bohnett LGBTQ Victory Institute Leadership Fellow.

== Career ==
Prior to his election to the city controller of Los Angeles, Galperin practiced law as both a transactional and litigation attorney for more than 20 years.

Galperin was the first Neighborhood Council member elected to citywide office in Los Angeles. As an officer of his local neighborhood council, he advocated for quality of life improvements and more responsible neighborhood planning. He also developed and taught "L.A. City Government 101" to new neighborhood council members throughout the city and served as a Neighborhood Council Budget Advocate.

Galperin was Chairman of the Los Angeles Commission on Revenue Efficiency. He also served as president of the city's Quality & Productivity Commission.

=== Los Angeles City Controller ===
Galperin was sworn in as the 19th Los Angeles city controller on July 1, 2013. Galperin launched ControlPanel LA, the city's first open data portal, in October 2013. Because of these efforts, Los Angeles has been named the No. 1 Digital City three years in a row by the U.S. Open Data Census. Government Technology magazine named Galperin to its list of the Top 25 Doers, Dreamers and Drivers of 2015.

Galperin created UtilityPanel.LA, a data portal featuring key financial data about DWP spending and payroll.

=== Candidacy for California State Controller ===
In May 2021, Galperin started running for a seat on the Los Angeles County Board of Supervisors, but announced in January 2022 that he would instead run for California State Controller. If elected, he would have been the first openly LGBTQ state controller.

== Personal life ==
Galperin was born to immigrant Jewish parents, one of whom was a Holocaust survivor. He is the first LGBT official elected citywide in Los Angeles. His husband, Zach Shapiro, is a rabbi, and they have two children.

Political offices
Preceded by Wendy Greuel	Los Angeles City Controller; 2013–2022	Succeeded by Kenneth Mejia
