= Wendy Greuel =

American politician

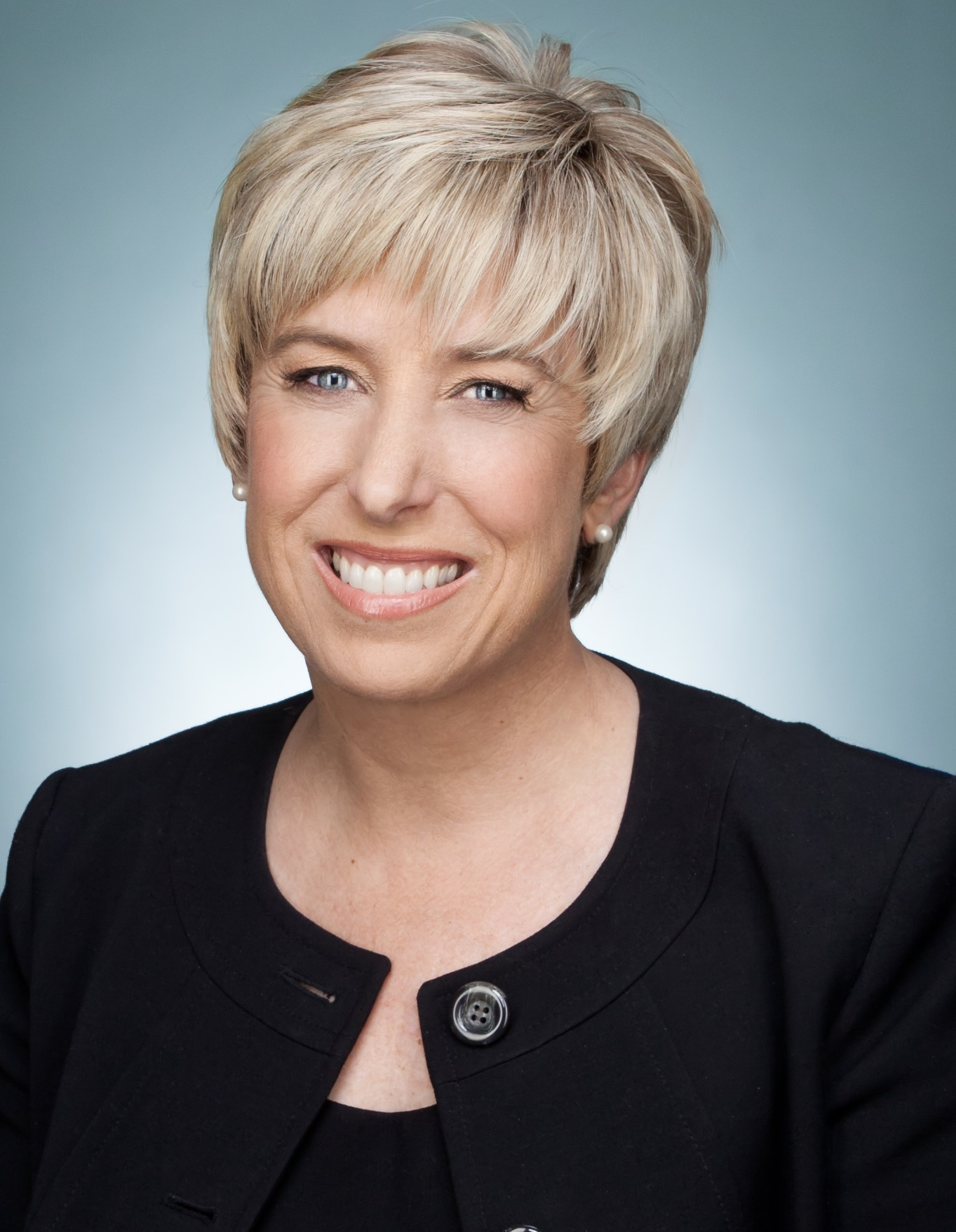
- Greuel in 2012

18th City Controller of Los Angeles
- In office July 1, 2009 – July 1, 2013
- Mayor: Antonio Villaraigosa
- Preceded by: Laura Chick
- Succeeded by: Ron Galperin

Member of the Los Angeles City Council from the 2nd District
- In office July 1, 2002 – July 1, 2009
- Preceded by: Joel Wachs
- Succeeded by: Paul Krekorian

President pro tempore of the Los Angeles City Council
- In office July 1, 2005 – July 7, 2009
- Preceded by: Cindy Miscikowski
- Succeeded by: Jan Perry

Personal details
- Born: Wendy Jane Greuel; May 23, 1961 (age 65) Los Angeles, California, U.S.
- Party: Democratic
- Spouse: Dean Schramm (m. 2002)
- Children: 1
- Education: University of California, Los Angeles

Wendy Jane Greuel (born May 23, 1961) is an American politician. She served as Los Angeles City Controller from 2009 to 2013. Greuel was the second woman elected to citywide office in Los Angeles, after her predecessor Laura Chick.

Previously, she served as a member of the Los Angeles City Council from 2002 to 2009, where she served as President Pro Tempore and represented the 2nd District, which includes portions of the San Fernando Valley. Greuel was a candidate for Mayor of Los Angeles in 2013, losing to Eric Garcetti, followed by a loss running for California's 33rd congressional district.

She was the first woman to advance to a Los Angeles mayoral runoff, performing better than previous female candidates Linda Griego in 1993, Kathleen Connell in 2001 and Jan Perry also in 2013.

== Early and career ==
She was born and raised in the San Fernando Valley, the daughter of a Christian church founder. Greuel graduated from Kennedy High School and served as student body president. During high school, she served as a member of then-Mayor Tom Bradley's Youth Council. She continued her education at the University of California, Los Angeles, during which time she interned for Councilman Joel Wachs, Mayor Tom Bradley and the City of Los Angeles's office in Washington DC.

=== Office of Mayor Tom Bradley ===
Upon graduation, Greuel worked in Mayor Bradley's office for ten years, serving as Bradley's liaison to the City Council, city departments, and the community on public policy issues ranging from child care to homelessness to senior care and health issues.

During this time, she established the city's first AIDS coordinator, secured funding from the City Council for condoms and bleach to stop the spread of AIDS, worked to find housing for L.A.'s homeless population, including Vietnam War veterans, and helped to create LA's Best, a nationally recognized after-school program for public elementary school students.

=== Clinton Administration ===
From 1993 to 1997, Greuel worked in the administration of President Bill Clinton. She served with Housing and Urban Development Cabinet Secretaries Henry Cisneros and Andrew Cuomo, first as the deputy director of the Interagency Council on Homelessness and later as the field operations officer for Southern California, where she became involved in projects offering opportunities for home ownership, job creation, economic development and social services. During her tenure, she managed HUD's response to the 1994 Northridge earthquake, which included securing over $1 billion in federal funding for recovery efforts.

=== DreamWorks ===
From 1997 to 2002, Greuel worked as an executive in government and community affairs for DreamWorks SKG, an entertainment studio in Los Angeles.

== Los Angeles City Council (2002–2009) ==
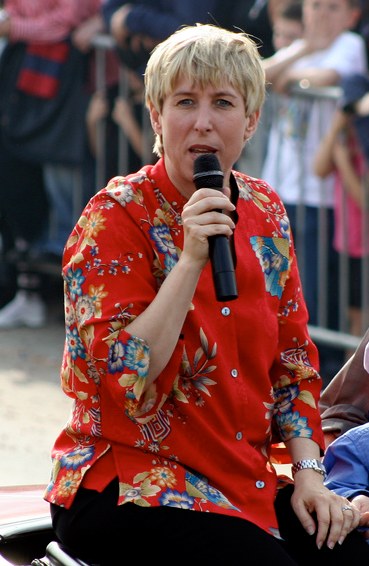
Greuel in 2006

In 2002, Greuel won a runoff election against Assemblyman Tony Cardenas to fill the remainder of the term of second district Los Angeles Councilman Joel Wachs. She was elected to a full term in 2003 and re-elected in 2007. She served until July 2009, when she was elected to the office of City Controller.

At the time of her departure from the City Council, she was President Pro Tempore, chair of the Transportation Committee and Ad-Hoc Committee on Business Tax Reform, vice chair of the Budget and Finance Committee, and member of the Audits and Governmental Efficiency and Energy and Environment Committees.

As Chair of the Transportation Committee, Greuel added 450 left-turn signals to city streets and led a program to synchronize city traffic lights. She also banned road construction during rush hour and created anti-gridlock zones throughout the city to prevent motorists from parking on major thoroughfares during rush hour.

As Chair of the Ad-Hoc Committee on Business Tax Reform, she implemented a business tax reform proposal in 2003 that reduced business taxes by 15% overall, eliminated all business taxes for companies with gross receipts under $100,000 annually and has returned nearly $100 million to local small businesses.

As a member of the Energy and Environment Committee, Greuel preserved nearly 1,200 acres of open space, including securing funding to purchase 225 acres in the Verdugo Mountains to create the sixth largest passive park in the city. She championed the Scenic Preservation Corridor Plan, which prevents development along the Verdugo's ridge lines. Greuel banned smoking in farmers markets and proposed that all new buildings be wired for solar technology.

Through her position on the Audits and Governmental Efficiency Committee, Greuel helped establish the Office of Public Safety in 2004, which consolidated all city-operated security forces (other than the LAPD) and created the Police Fund, a program through which any elected official could address inefficiencies and allocate the money saved to the hiring of new police officers.

She developed the Stolen Vehicle Recovery Program, which enabled Department of Transportation officers (rather than police officers) to tow stolen vehicles, allowing police officers more time to respond to violent crime. Greuel also implemented the 50/50 sidewalk program, expediting sidewalk repairs when neighbors contributed 50% of the cost, created the Waste, Fraud, and Abuse Investigative Unit in the City Controller's office and banned political fundraising among City Commissioners.

Greuel launched a district-wide anti-graffiti campaign and pushed to increase the number of neighborhood watch organizations in her district. She also implemented a safety valet program designed to ensure that all elementary school students were supervised entering and exiting schools.

In 2004, Greuel was an instrumental part of a major controversy in a neighborhood in her district when she chose to close a pedestrian bridge. There was a dispute between homeowners on the north side of the Los Angeles River and renters on the south side. Parking was an issue for the renters; they would use the north side neighborhood as overflow parking and cross the pedestrian bridge to their homes. Without any warning, the bridge was closed in 2005. The renters called for a town hall meeting, after which the bridge remained closed. The LAPD then became involved, saying they would close the bridge for 90 days to see if crime rates (the reason the homeowners cited to close the bridge) were affected. Near the end of the trial period, another town hall meeting was called and the officer in charge said that there was no significant change in the crime rates on the north side of the bridge. In the days before the final recommendation from the LAPD was to be released, this officer was discharged from the case and another officer was put in charge. This second officer recommended the bridge be closed for unknown reasons. This remains a point of contention in the renters' neighborhood, as parking is sparse and residents often have to walk blocks to get home while the bridge remains closed. Greuel stayed adamant that the decision to close the bridge was about crime, not parking: "We've received a variety of complaints from people on the bridge side of graffiti, vandalism, drug sales." The police study during those 90 days, however, refuted those claims.

== City Controller of Los Angeles (2009–2013) ==
Greuel defeated Nick Patsaouras and Kathleen Suzy Evans on March 3, 2009, to become the City Controller of Los Angeles. She took office on July 1, 2009.

=== Audit record ===
By the end of her four-year term, Greuel's office claimed that she had identified over $160 million in waste, fraud and abuse. This assertion emerged as an issue during her 2013 mayoral campaign when her opponent Eric Garcetti argued that the amount was misleading as only several million dollars had actually been recovered. Greuel responded that she had in fact identified over $160 million but that the responsibility for recovering the money belonged to the Mayor and City Council.

In November 2009 and through a follow-up audit in November 2011, Greuel tracked the progress of the LAPD's backlog of untested rape kits. While the department made significant progress in reducing the backlog, Greuel made a series of recommendations to ensure future rape kits would not sit untested on the department's shelves.

In November 2011, Greuel expanded the city's Waste, Fraud, and Abuse hotline to accommodate whistleblower tips in more than 150 languages. A tip in 2012 led to Greuel's audit of the Department of Recreation and Parks that found that the city had spent $2 million to house caretakers at two of its remote camps that had been closed for thirteen and twenty years, respectively.

In October 2011, Greuel called for the city to transition to performance based budgeting, a system that requires departments to plan based on specific goals, rather than the line-item budgeting being used. Mayor Eric Garcetti adopted Greuel's recommendation when developing his first budget for Fiscal Year 2014.

In May 2011, Greuel audited the city's cell phone use and found that the city wasted as much as $1 million annually by overpaying cellphone carriers and maintaining hundreds of phones that were not in use for months at a time, among other practices.

In October 2010, then-City Attorney Carmen Trutanich announced a series of reforms to the workers compensation unit in his office after Greuel uncovered that the unit took too long to settle cases and failed to collect millions of dollars it was due. In 2008, Greuel's predecessor, Controller Laura N. Chick had attempted to audit then-City Attorney Rocky Delgadillo's workers compensation unit; however, when Chick issued subpoenas to six of his employees, he sued to block her efforts. Greuel and Trutanich inherited the lawsuit; when a judge ruled in favor of the City Attorney, Greuel appealed the decision, arguing that the City Controller should have the authority to audit all city departments, including elected officials. In October 2011, an appeals court neglected to say whether elected officials could be audited.

Also in October 2010, Greuel penned an op-ed in The Nation with then-Public Advocate, current New York City Mayor Bill de Blasio blasting the Citizens United decision and announcing that they had joined with leaders from other states to found the Coalition for Accountability in Political Spending to encourage corporations to be transparent about their political spending.

In August 2010, in the aftermath of the pay scandal in the City of Bell, Greuel unveiled a comprehensive list of city employee salaries on her website, making Los Angeles the largest city in the United States to make this information public.

In July 2010, Greuel reported in one of her audits that the City of Los Angeles had failed to collect over $260 million in traffic tickets and other debts owed to the city, 47% of all debts.

In July 2009, Greuel announced that her Delinquent Taxpayer Program had successfully collected nearly $3 million from 16 delinquent taxpayers in just four months. She stated that over $107 million in delinquent taxes was still to be collected.

=== Calendar controversy ===
On January 7, 2013, the Los Cerritos News published Greuel's public schedule since taking office as Los Angeles City Controller. The article alleged that "she has spent an overwhelming majority of her official schedule for the past three years attending lavish dinners, lunches, breakfasts, and social events in an effort to advance her 2013 mayoral campaign" in possible violation of the Los Angeles Governmental Ethics Commission Ordinance.

== 2013 Los Angeles mayoral campaign ==
Greuel was a candidate for Mayor of Los Angeles in the 2013 election. In the primary election, she placed second to Eric Garcetti and came ahead of Jan Perry, Kevin James and Emanuel Pleitez, thereby advancing to the runoff. Her candidacy was endorsed by a number of public officials including former President Bill Clinton, former Mayor Richard Riordan, LA County Supervisors Gloria Molina and Mark Ridley-Thomas, State Assembly Speaker John Perez and former Speaker Bob Hertzberg and labor leader Dolores Huerta. She ultimately lost the general election to Eric Garcetti, who became Mayor on July 1, 2013. Had she been elected, Greuel would have been the city's first woman Mayor. She was the first woman to advance to a Los Angeles mayoral runoff, performing better than previous female candidates Linda Griego in 1993, Kathleen Connell in 2001 and Jan Perry in 2013.

After the election, Greuel was viewed as a potentially formidable candidate to replace outgoing LA County Supervisor Zev Yaroslavsky. However, on January 9, 2014, she announced that she would not be a candidate in the open race.

== Subsequent career ==
Greuel currently works as a consultant to both the Discovery Cube Science Center in the San Fernando Valley and the California State University, Northridge David Nazarian College of Business and Economics. Mayor Garcetti appointed Greuel as Chairwoman of the Los Angeles Homeless Services Authority and Los Angeles County Supervisor Sheila Kuehl appointed her to the Governing Council of the Los Angeles County Initiative on Women and Girls.

She is a member of the Boards of Directors of Abode Communities, the Center for Asian Americans United for Self Empowerment (CAUSE), Emerge California, EMILY's List, the Homeland Security Advisory Council, the Los Angeles YMCA, and Oakwood School, the advisory board of The Everychild Foundation, the President's Advisory Council of The Fulfillment Fund, and was one of eleven members of the LA Unified Advisory Task Force, charged with advising LAUSD Superintendent Michelle King.

== Personal life ==
Greuel is married to attorney Dean Schramm, whom she met during her 2002 campaign; they have a son, born in 2003. Schramm is a former president of the American Jewish Committee - Los Angeles Executive Board, was active in its "Darfur Task Force" and was the executive producer of the documentary Darfur Now. Schramm is Jewish, and the couple have raised their son in the Jewish faith.

Political offices
Preceded by Laura N. Chick	Los Angeles City Controller; 2009–2013	Succeeded by Ron Galperin
Preceded by Joel Wachs	Los Angeles City Council; 2nd District; 2002–09	Succeeded by Paul Krekorian
Preceded by Cindy Miscikowski	President Pro Tempore of the Los Angeles City Council; 2005–09	Succeeded by Jan Perry
