= Dennis Zine =

American politician

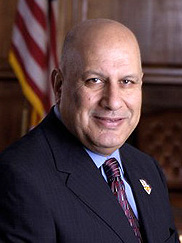
- Official portrait, 2006

Member of the Los Angeles City Council from the 3rd district
- In office July 1, 2001 – July 1, 2013
- Preceded by: Laura N. Chick
- Succeeded by: Bob Blumenfield

Assistant President Pro Tempore of the Los Angeles City Council
- In office July 28, 2009 – January 3, 2012
- Preceded by: Jan Perry
- Succeeded by: Tom LaBonge

Personal details
- Born: Dennis Phillip Zine; August 1, 1947 (age 79) Los Angeles, California, U.S.
- Party: Independent (2011–present); Republican (before 2011)
- Spouse: Divorced
- Children: 2
- Education: Notre Dame High School
- Alma mater: California State University, Los Angeles
- Website: cd3.lacity.org
- Police career
- Country: United States
- Department: Los Angeles Police Department
- Service years: Police Officer: 1969 – 1997; Reserve Officer: 2001 – Present
- Rank: Sworn in as an Officer – 1969 – Police Officer 3 – Sergeant I – Sergeant II
- Awards: – 1992 Civil Disturbance Ribbon; California Highway Patrol, Police Officer of the Year – 1992

Dennis Phillip Zine (born August 1, 1947) is an American politician, who served on the Los Angeles City Council for the 3rd district from 2001 to 2013. A member of the Republican Party who later became unaffiliated in 2011, Zine was elected to City Council in 2001 and re-elected in 2005 and 2009.

== Early life ==
He grew up in Hollywood, California, the son of Lebanese immigrants. His father, Phillip, was a gardener and his mother, Alice, was a homemaker. He attended Notre Dame High School, class of 1966. He attended Cal State Los Angeles, graduating in 1970.

== Career ==
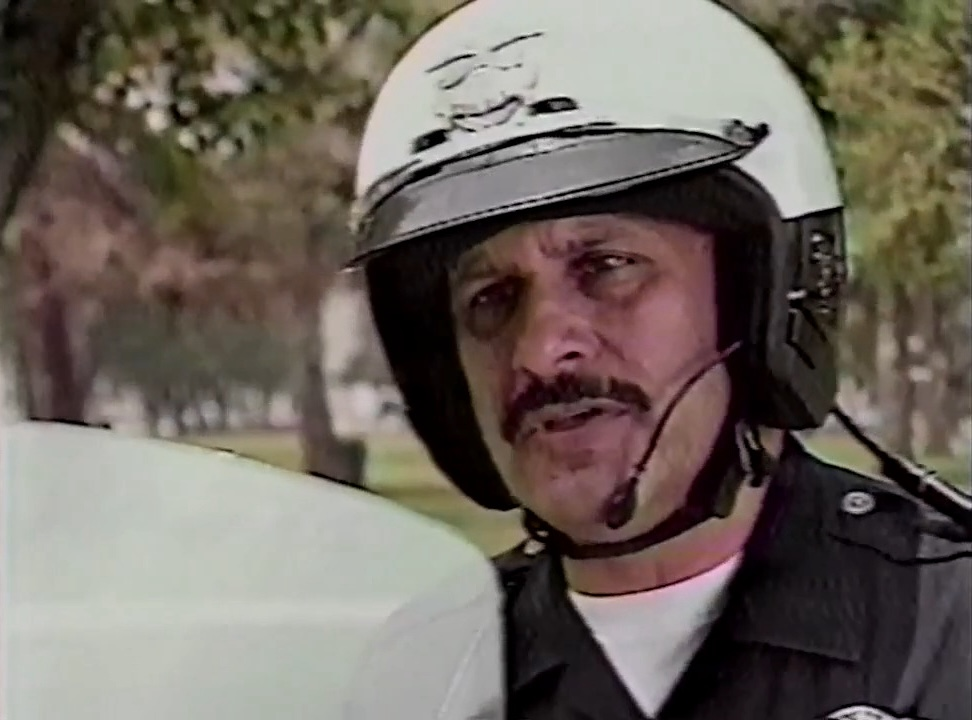
Zine as an officer in 1992

=== Los Angeles Police Department ===
Zine was a police officer with the Los Angeles Police Department for over 28 years. Councilman Zine is a former Los Angeles Police Department sergeant and a current reserve officer. He worked Valley Traffic Detail and served as liaison for Deputy Chief Mark Kroeker in the aftermath of the 1992 riots. He was honored as officer of the year by the California Highway Patrol. He has been elected three times to the Board of Directors of the Police Protective League, representing the 9,100 rank and file officers.

=== Civic engagement ===
Councilman Zine is a past president and active member of The Executives, a support group of Los Angeles Jewish Health (formerly Los Angeles Jewish Home). For over 10 years he has been an active member of Mothers Against Drunk Driving and has served on the Board of Directors of Haven Hills Battered Women's Shelter.

Zine was first elected to public office in 1997 to represent San Fernando Valley interests on the Charter Reform Commission. In this capacity, he served as Vice Chairman.

Zine expanded his government service role as the President of the Independent Cities Association (ICA); as the City's representative with the National League of Cities, serving as a member of the Board of Directors and the Chair of the National Immigration Task Force; and as a member of the League of California Cities Board of Directors. He was also a member of the Los Angeles County Judicial Procedures Commission.

== Los Angeles City Council (2001–2013) ==
=== Elections ===
Zine was elected to represent the 3rd District of the Los Angeles City Council in 2001. He was re-elected in 2005 and 2009, but city term limits prevented him running for a fourth term.

=== Tenure ===
In February 2008, Zine proposed an anti-paparazzi "Personal Safety Law" for Los Angeles to ensure a safety zone for celebrities against photographers. The measure was in direct response to several incidents in which celebrities were hindered from entering medical facilities or caught in pursuits with paparazzi.

Zine was one of two Republican Party members of the City Council until he changed his registration to Decline to State in 2011. The Los Angeles Times reported "He said he did so because he's tired of the 'gridlock' of partisan politics and because his liberal positions on gay marriage and other social issues are out of line with traditional Republican views."

== Post-Council career ==
=== 2013 Los Angeles City Controller election ===
Zine announced his candidacy for the position of Los Angeles City Controller in July 2011, following his City Council predecessor, Laura N. Chick, who served as City Controller from 2001 to 2009. In a primary election field of six candidates, Zine placed second, trailing Ron Galperin, an attorney and businessman who had run for elected City offices unsuccessfully in the past.

In 2018 Zine started and two weeks later halted a campaign for State Assembly in a Special Election to replace Matt Dababneh in California Assembly District 45. Zine garnered 7.7% of the vote.

== See also ==
- Los Angeles City Council District 3
- South Central Farm

Political offices
| Preceded by Laura N. Chick | Los Angeles City Councilmember, 3rd district July 1, 2001 – July 1, 2013 | Succeeded by Bob Blumenfield |
| Preceded by Jan Perry | Assistant President Pro Tem of the Los Angeles City Council; July 28, 2009-January 3, 2012 | Succeeded by Tom LaBonge |
