= 2026 Los Angeles elections =

- June 2, 2026; November 3, 2026

8 out of 15 seats in the City Council 8 seats needed for a majority
Party	Democratic	Independent
Current seats	14	1

The 2026 Los Angeles elections were held on June 2, 2026. Voters will elect candidates in a nonpartisan primary, with potential runoff elections scheduled for November 3, 2026. Eight of the fifteen seats on the City Council are up for election, as are three of the seven seats in the Los Angeles Unified School District Board of Education. Mayor Karen Bass, city attorney Hydee Feldstein Soto, and city controller Kenneth Mejia ran for re-election.

Municipal elections in California are officially nonpartisan; candidates' party affiliations do not appear on the ballot.

== City controller ==
Los Angeles City Controller election
- June 2, 2026
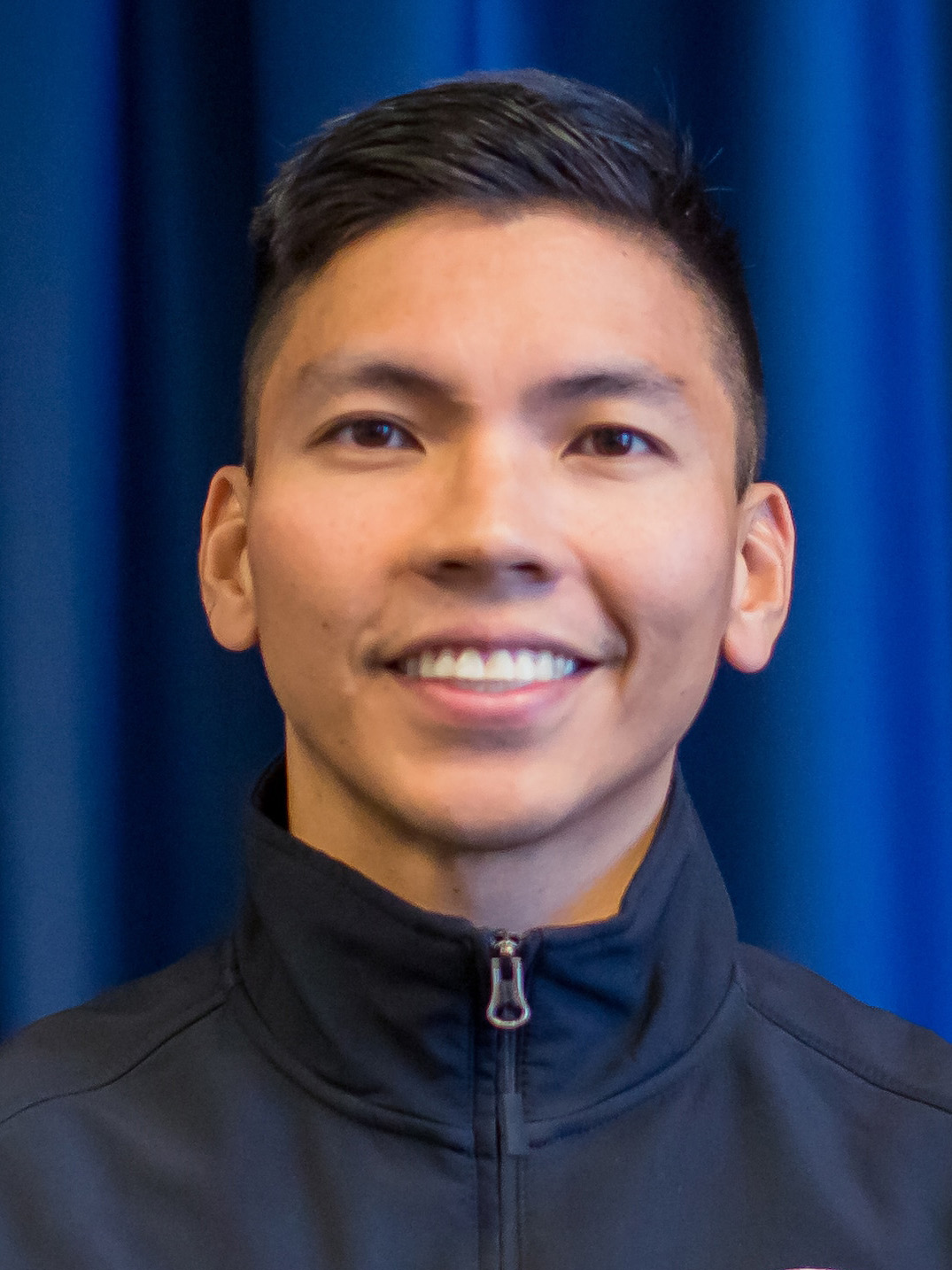

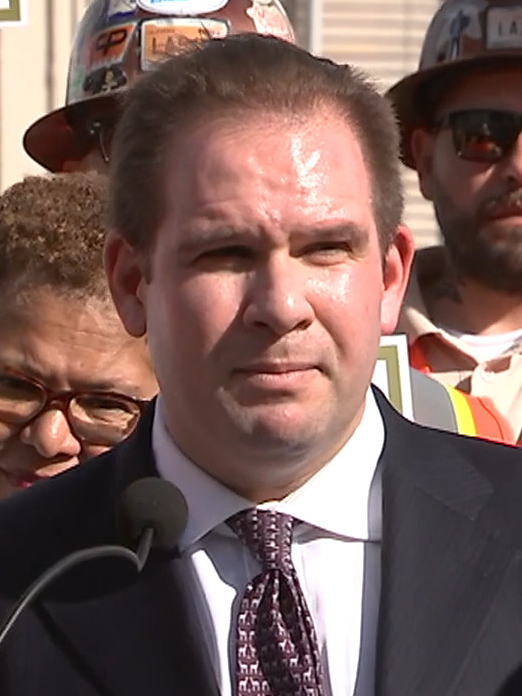
Candidate	Kenneth Mejia	Zach Sokoloff
Popular vote	473,188	277,722
Percentage	63.0%	37.0%
Controller before election
Kenneth Mejia
Elected Controller
Kenneth Mejia

The Los Angeles City Controller is the paymaster and chief accounting officer of the city. The incumbent was Kenneth Mejia, who was first elected in 2022 after defeating councilor Paul Koretz. He initially faced opposition from former state senator Isadore Hall III and capital management executive Zach Sokoloff, before Hall withdrew. Sokoloff's mother, Sheryl Sokoloff, contributed $7.5 million in independent expenditures to the race, which were spent on television advertisements and mailers attacking Mejia. Despite Sokoloff gaining the endorsement of the Los Angeles County Democratic Party, Mejia defeated Sokoloff in the primary, securing a second term as Controller.

=== Candidates ===
- Kenneth Mejia, incumbent city controller
- Zach Sokoloff, capital management executive

=== Withdrew ===
- Isadore Hall III, former California state senator

==== Declined ====
- Monica Rodriguez, city councilmember from the 7th district (2017–present) (ran for re-election)

=== Endorsements ===
Kenneth Mejia

Labor unions

- International Longshore and Warehouse Union
- United Teachers Los Angeles

Organizations

- California Working Families Party
Zach Sokoloff

Local officials

- Laura Chick, former city controller of Los Angeles (2001–2009)
- Paul Koretz, former city councilmember from the 5th district (2009–2022) and candidate for the seat in 2022
- Wendy Greuel, former city controller of Los Angeles (2009–2013)
- Rick Tuttle, former city controller of Los Angeles (1985–2001)

Political parties

- Los Angeles County Democratic Party
Declined to endorse

Labor unions

- Los Angeles County Federation of Labor

=== Results ===
2026 Los Angeles City Controller election
Candidate	Votes	%
Kenneth Mejia (incumbent)	473,188	63.02
Zach Sokoloff	277,722	36.98
Total votes	750,910	100.00

== City council ==
=== District 1 ===
Los Angeles City Council District 1 election
- June 2, 2026; November 3, 2026
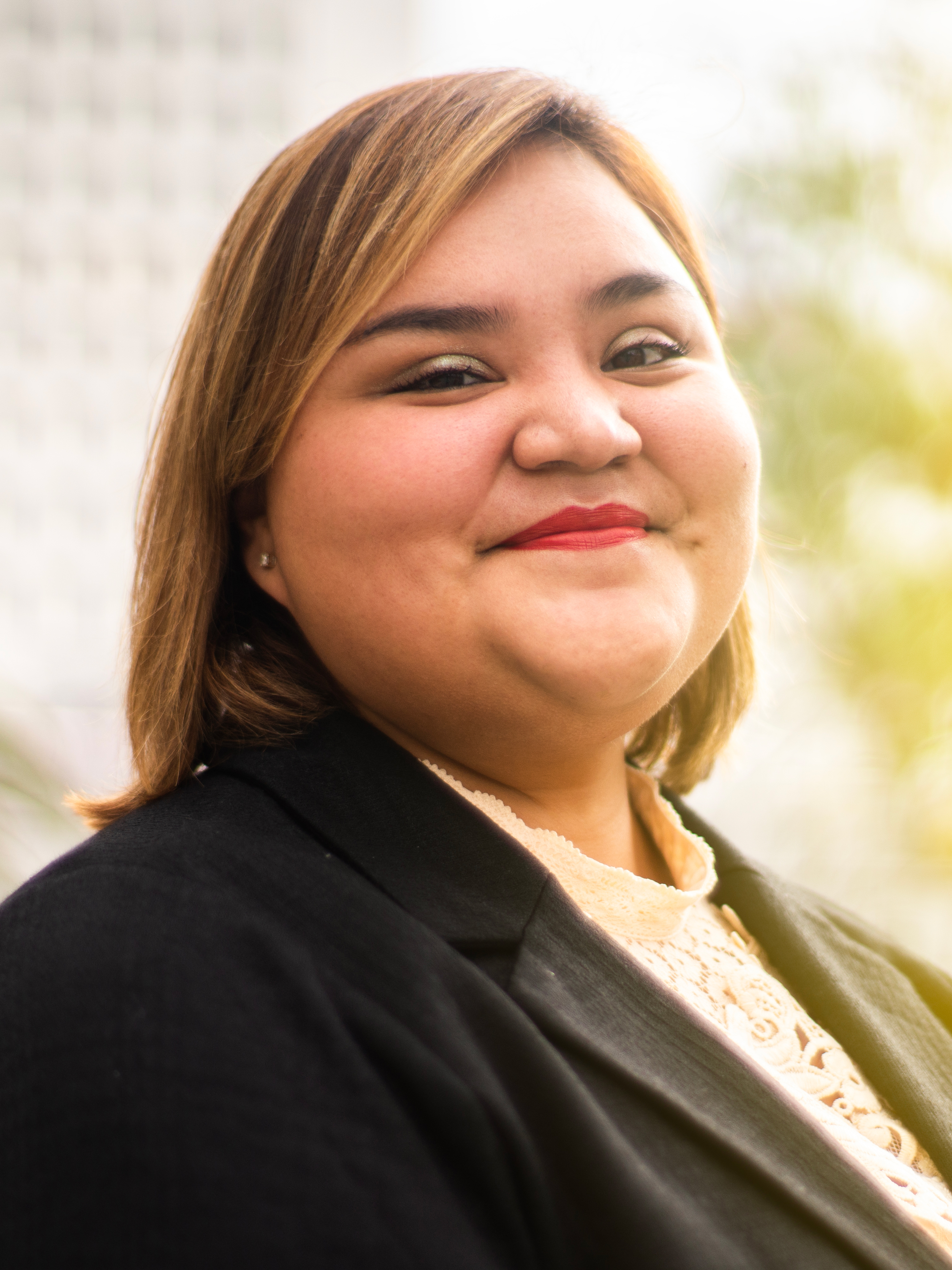

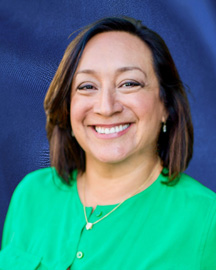

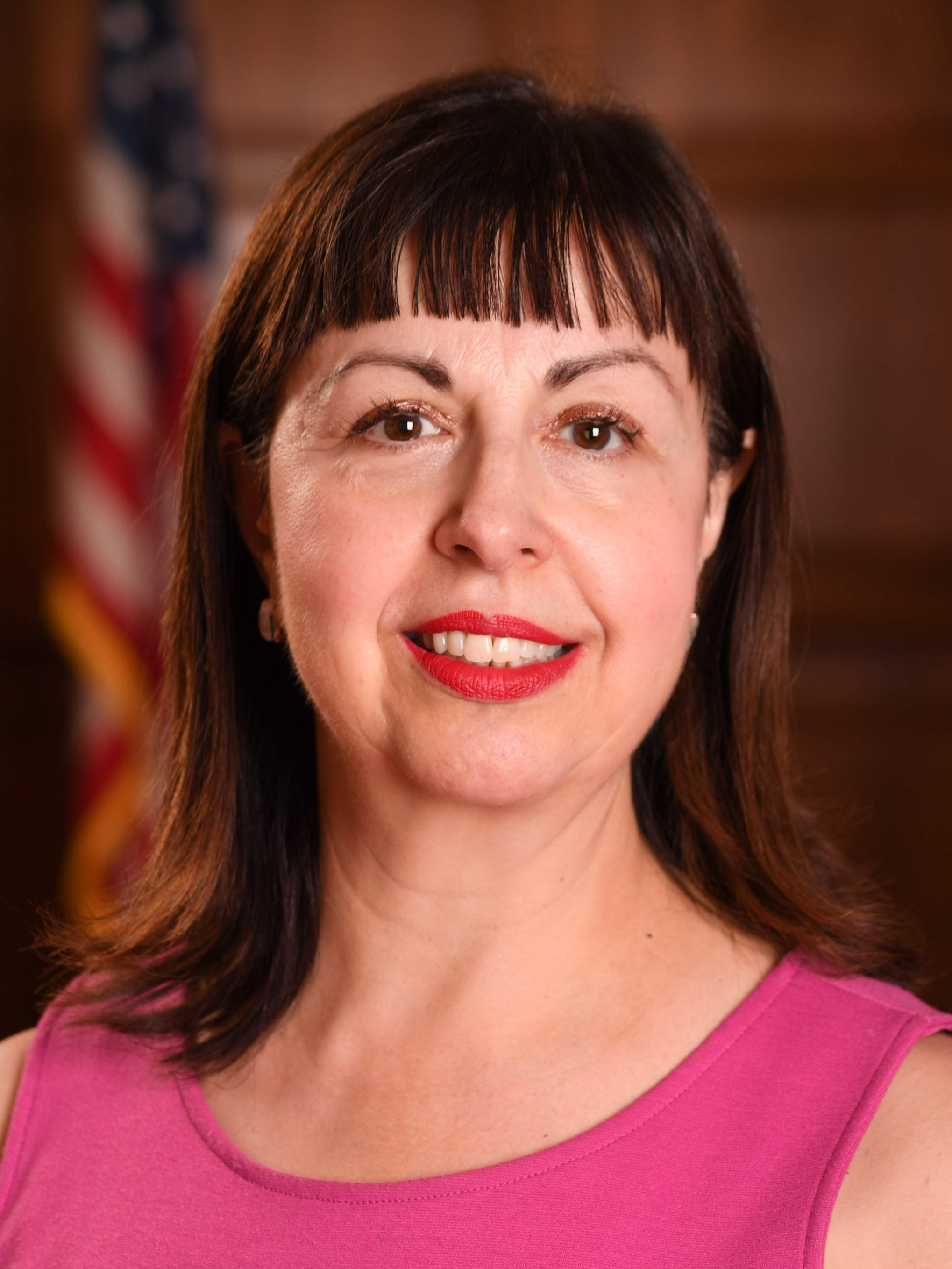
Candidate	Eunisses Hernandez	Maria Lou Calanche	Raul Claros
Popular vote	21,712	5,980	3,832
Percentage	57.7%	15.9%	10.2%
Candidate	Nelson Grande	Sylvia Robledo
Popular vote	3,321	2,791
Percentage	8.8%	7.4%
City Councilmember before election
Eunisses Hernandez
Elected City Councilmember
Eunisses Hernandez

The 1st district encompasses neighborhoods in Northeast Los Angeles and Downtown Los Angeles, including the areas of Glassell Park, Highland Park, Chinatown, Mount Washington, Echo Park, Elysian Park, Westlake, Pico-Union, Koreatown, Angelino Heights, Lincoln Heights, and MacArthur Park. The incumbent was Eunisses Hernandez, who was first elected in 2022 after defeating Gil Cedillo. Hernandez ran for re-election, and won outright in the primary against four challengers.

==== Candidates ====
===== Declared =====
- Raul Claros, former member of the Los Angeles Police Permit Review Panel
- Eunisses Hernandez, incumbent councilmember
- Sylvia Robledo, former field deputy for councilmember Gil Cedillo
- Maria Lou Calanche, member of the Los Angeles Police Commission
- Nelson Grande, actor

===== Disqualified =====
- Annalee Harr
- Joseph Lucey, businessman
- Jesse Rojas, tax preparer and businessman
- Rosa Requeno, community activist

==== Endorsements ====
Eunisses Hernandez

U.S. senators

- Bernie Sanders, Vermont (2007–present) (Independent)

Local officials

- Marqueece Harris-Dawson, president of the Los Angeles City Council (2024–present) from the 8th district (2015–present)
- Kenneth Mejia, city controller of Los Angeles (2022–present)
- Nithya Raman, city councilmember from the 4th district (2020–present)

Labor unions

- Los Angeles County Federation of Labor
- United Auto Workers Region 6
- United Teachers Los Angeles

Organizations

- Los Angeles Democratic Socialists of America

Political parties

- Los Angeles County Democratic Party
- California Working Families Party

==== Results ====
2026 Los Angeles City Council District 1 election
Candidate	Votes	%
Eunisses Hernandez (incumbent)	21,712	57.69
Maria Lou Calanche	5,980	15.89
Raul Claros	3,832	10.18
Nelson Grande	3,321	8.82
Sylvia Robledo	2,791	7.42
Total votes	37,636	100.00

=== District 3 ===
Los Angeles City Council District 3 election
- June 2, 2026; November 3, 2026
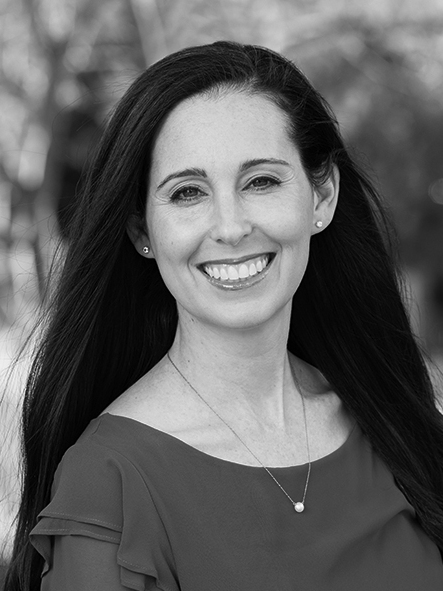

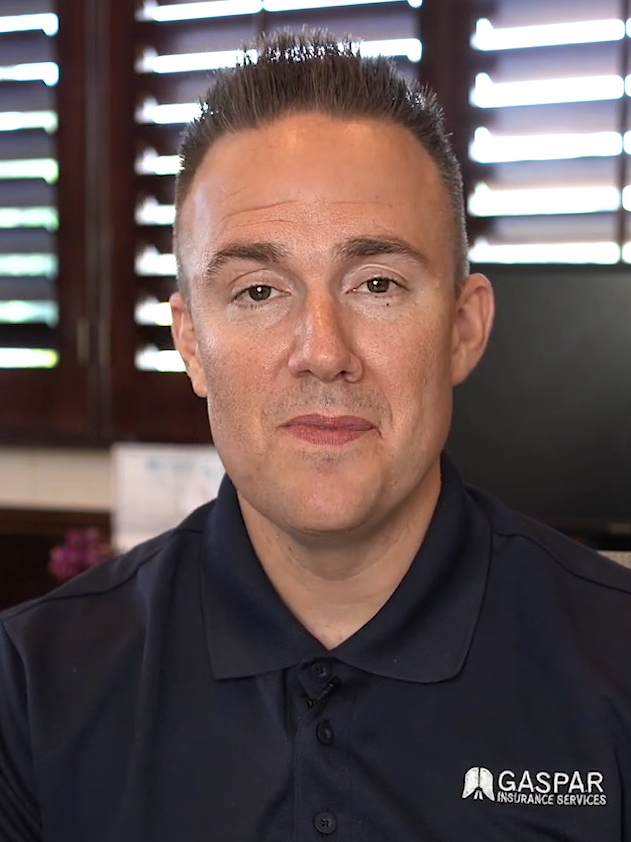

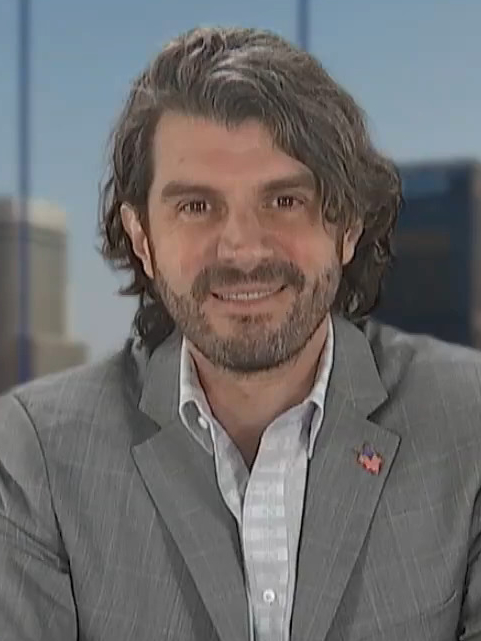
Candidate	Barri Worth Girvan	Tim Gaspar	Christopher Robert Celona
First round	20,539; 42.5%	22,263; 46.1%	5,512; 11.4%
Runoff	TBD	TBD	Eliminated
Councilmember before election
Bob Blumenfield
Elected Councilmember
Barri Worth Girvan

The 3rd district is located in the western San Fernando Valley, bordering Ventura County and including the neighborhoods of Woodland Hills, Tarzana, Reseda, Winnetka and Canoga Park. The incumbent is Bob Blumenfield, who was first elected in 2013. Blumenfield is term-limited cannot seek re-election to office. Insurance executive Tim Gaspar and county director Barri Worth Girvan advanced to the runoff.

==== Candidates ====
===== Advanced to runoff =====
- Tim Gaspar, insurance executive
- Barri Worth Girvan, Director of Community Affairs for County Supervisor Lindsey Horvath

===== Eliminated in primary =====
- Christopher Robert Celona, media executive

===== Disqualified =====
- Lehi White, small business owner
- Jon Rawlings, vice president of Centra Companies

==== Endorsements ====
Tim Gaspar

County officials

- Kathryn Barger, Los Angeles County supervisor from the 5th district (2016–present)

State legislators

- Robert Hertzberg, former majority leader of the California Senate (2019–2022) from SD-18 (2014–2022)

Individuals

- Rick Caruso, founder of Caruso and runner-up for mayor of Los Angeles in 2022

Labor unions

- Los Angeles Police Protective League
Barri Worth Girvan

County officials

- Lindsey Horvath, Los Angeles County supervisor from the 3rd district (2022–present)

Labor unions

- Los Angeles County Federation of Labor

Political parties

- Los Angeles County Democratic Party
Jon Rawlings (did not qualify)

Organizations

- Run for Something

==== Results ====
2026 Los Angeles City Council District 3 election
Candidate	Votes	%
Tim Gaspar	22,263	46.08
Barri Worth Girvan	20,539	42.51
Christopher Robert Celona	5,512	11.41
Total votes	48,314	100.00
General election
Barri Worth Girvan		
Tim Gaspar		
Total votes		

=== District 5 ===
Los Angeles City Council District 5 election
- June 2, 2026; November 3, 2026
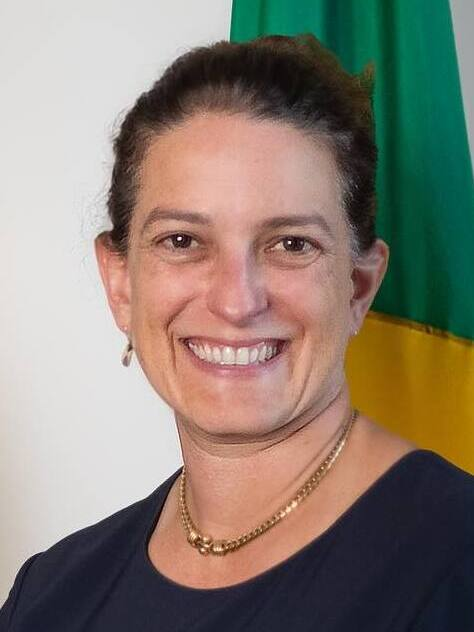

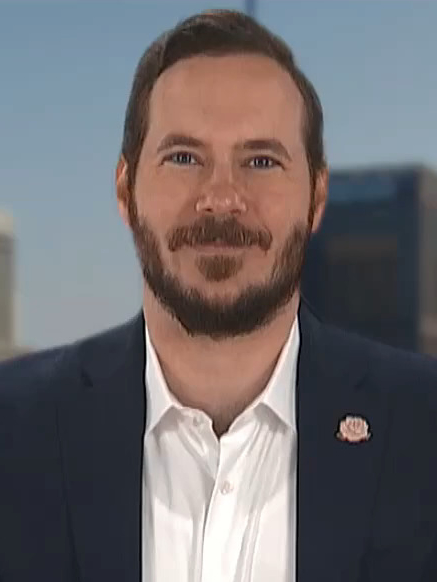

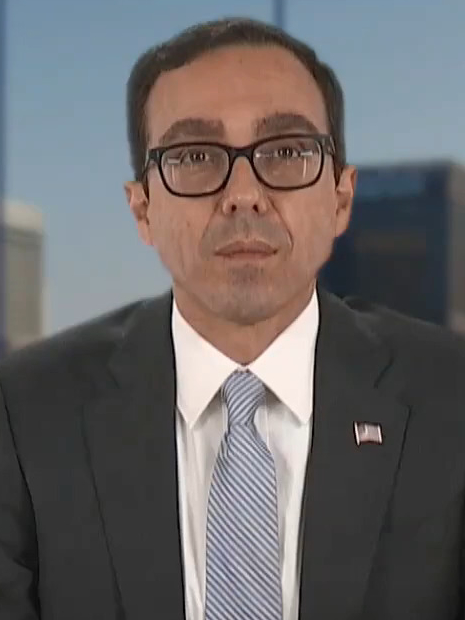
Candidate	Katy Yaroslavsky	Henry Mantel	Morgan Oyler
Popular vote	45,174	18,022	7,223
Percentage	64.2%	25.6%	10.3%
Councilmember before election
Katy Yaroslavsky
Elected Councilmember
Katy Yaroslavsky

The 5th district is located on the Westside region of Los Angeles and includes the neighborhoods of the Fairfax District, Pico-Robertson, Westwood, Beverly Grove and Miracle Mile. The incumbent is Katy Yaroslavsky, who was first elected in 2022 after defeating Sam Yebri. Yaroslavsky ran for re-election, and won outright against two other candidates in the primary.

==== Candidates ====
===== Declared =====
- Katy Yaroslavsky, incumbent councilmember
- Henry Mantel, tenants rights attorney
- Morgan Oyler, small business accountant

===== Disqualified =====
- Peter Gerard Kearns, city employee
- Eddie Ha, real estate agent
- Dory Frank, publicist
- Ashkan Nazarian, co-founder of AAA Diamond of Jewelry

==== Endorsements ====
Henry Mantel

Organizations

- Run for Something
Katy Yaroslavsky

Labor unions

- Los Angeles County Federation of Labor

Political parties

- Los Angeles County Democratic Party

==== Results ====
2026 Los Angeles City Council District 5 election
Candidate	Votes	%
Katy Yaroslavsky (incumbent)	45,174	64.15
Henry Mantel	18,022	25.59
Morgan Oyler	7,223	10.26
Total votes	70,419	100.00

=== District 7 ===
Los Angeles City Council District 7 election
- June 2, 2026; November 3, 2026
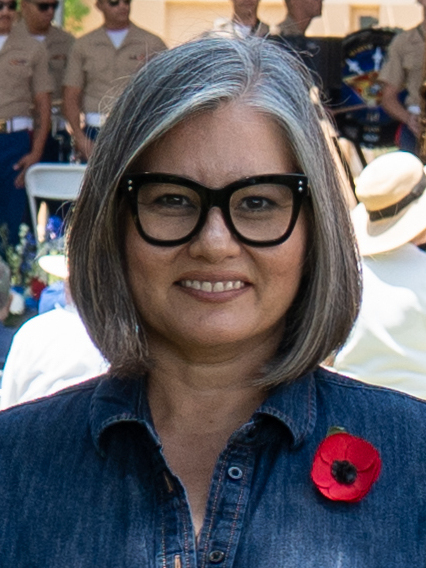
Candidate	Monica Rodriguez
First round	34,801
Runoff	100.0%
Councilmember before election
Monica Rodriguez
Elected Councilmember
Monica Rodriguez

The 7th district is located in the northern San Fernando Valley and includes the neighborhoods of Sylmar, Lake View Terrace, Sunland-Tujunga, Pacoima, Arleta and Mission Hills. The incumbent is Monica Rodriguez, who was first elected in 2017 and re-elected in 2022. The Los Angeles Times speculated that she may run for Mayor or City Controller, but she later filed for re-election. She ran unopposed in the primary after no one filed a petition to challenge her, and was the only city councilmember to run unopposed in the election.

==== Candidates ====
===== Declared =====
- Monica Rodriguez, incumbent councilmember

===== Disqualified =====
- Ernesto Ayala, worker advocate
- Michael Ebenkamp, former president of the North Hills Neighborhood Council
- Daniel Lerma, business owner
- Tony Rodriguez, regional recruiting manager

==== Endorsements ====
Monica Rodriguez

Labor unions

- Los Angeles County Federation of Labor

Political parties

- Los Angeles County Democratic Party

==== Results ====
2026 Los Angeles City Council District 7 election
Candidate	Votes	%
Monica Rodriguez (incumbent)	34,801	100.00%
Total votes	34,801	100.00%

=== District 9 ===
Los Angeles City Council District 9 election
- June 2, 2026; November 3, 2026
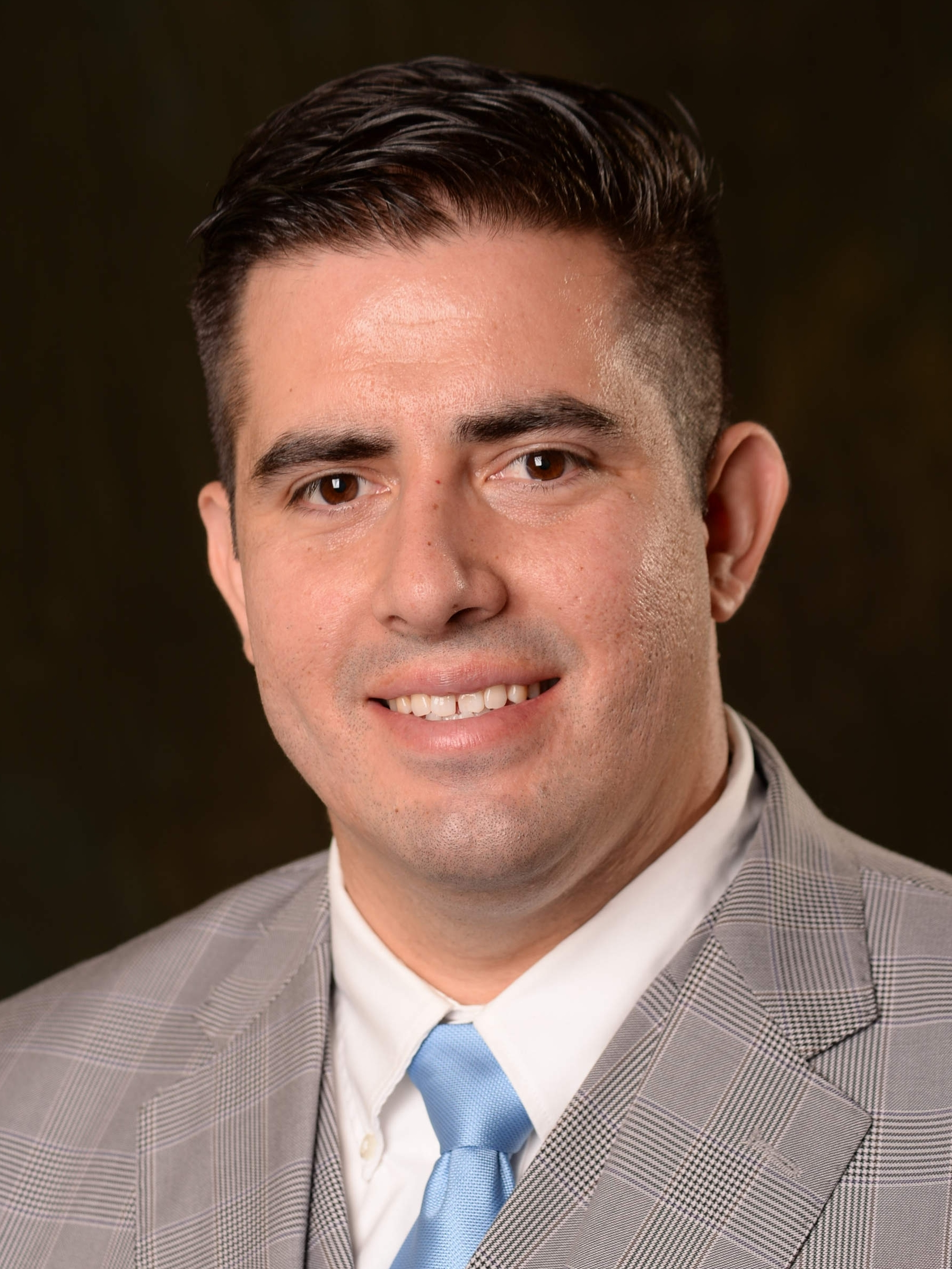

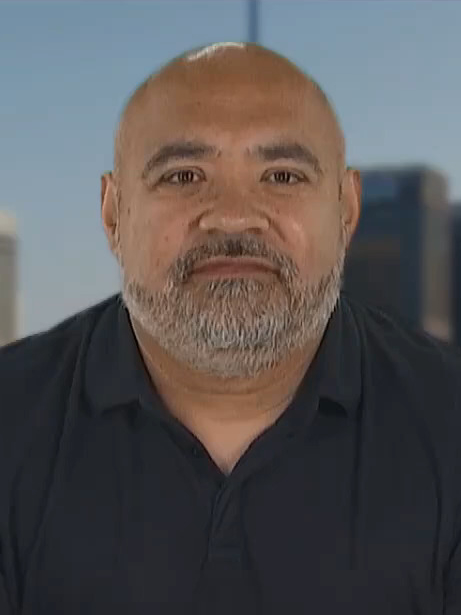

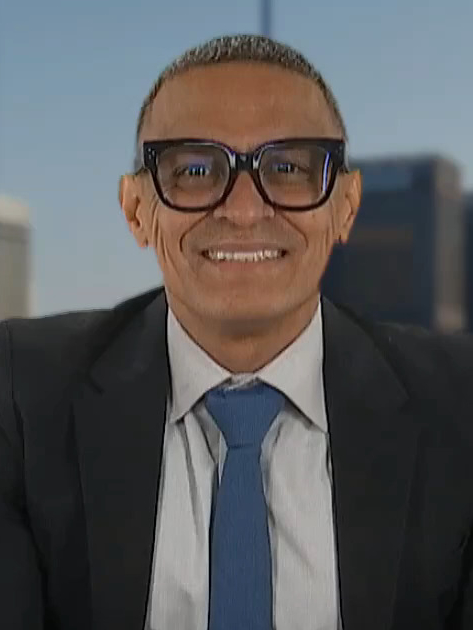

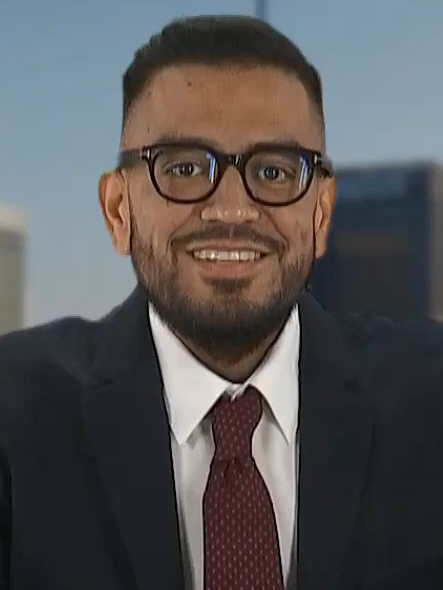
Candidate	Jose Ugarte	Estuardo Mazariegos	Jorge Nuño
First round	8,009; 39.4%	5,340; 26.3%	2,218; 10.9%
Runoff	TBD	TBD	Eliminated
Candidate	Elmer Roldan	Martha Sánchez	Jorge Hernandez Rosas
First round	1,948; 9.6%	1,784; 8.8%	1,042; 5.1%
Runoff	Eliminated	Eliminated	Eliminated
Incumbent Councilmember
Curren Price

The 9th district is situated in the South Los Angeles region and encompasses the neighborhoods of Exposition Park, Historic South Central, and the L.A. Live–Los Angeles Convention Center complex within South Park. The incumbent is Curren Price, who was first elected in 2013. He is term-limited and can not seek re-election to office, and has instead endorsed his chief of staff Jose Ugarte to replace him. Ugarte and community organizer Estuardo Mazariegos advanced to the runoff. The district will have its first Latino representative and first non-Black council member in over 63 years, since Edward R. Roybal last represented it.

Ugarte's candidacy has been dogged by allegations that he violated city ethics rules by failing to disclose income he made from lobbying while working in City Hall.

==== Candidates ====
===== Advanced to runoff =====
- Estuardo Mazariegos, community organizer
- Jose Ugarte, chief of staff to incumbent Curren Price

===== Eliminated in primary =====
- Jorge Nuño, social entrepreneur
- Martha Sánchez, professor and therapist
- Elmer Roldan, executive director
- Jorge Hernandez Rosas, educator and therapist

===== Disqualified =====
- Enrique Hernandez-Garcia, college student
- Nathan Juarez, cashier
- Jo Uraizee, social worker
- Chris Martin, civil rights attorney
- Michelle Washington, social worker
- Adriana Cabrera, president of the Central Alameda Neighborhood Council

==== Endorsements ====
Estuardo Mazariegos

U.S. senators

- Bernie Sanders, Vermont (2007–present) (Independent)

Local officials

- Kenneth Mejia, Los Angeles City Controller

Labor unions

- United Teachers Los Angeles

Organizations

- Los Angeles Democratic Socialists of America
- Run for Something

Political parties

- California Working Families Party
Jose Ugarte

U.S. Representatives

- Diane Watson, U.S. representative for California's 32nd (2001–2003) and 33rd districts (2003–2011)

Statewide officials

- Jerome Horton, former California State Board of Equalization member

State legislators

- Steven Bradford, former California state senator
- Mike Gipson, state assemblymember from AD-65
- Isadore Hall III, former California state senator

Local officials

- James T. Butts Jr., mayor of Inglewood
- Heather Hutt, city councilmember from the 10th district
- Curren Price, incumbent councilmember
- Emma Sharif, mayor of Compton

Labor unions

- United Farm Workers

Newspapers

- Los Angeles Sentinel

Political parties

- Los Angeles County Democratic Party

==== Results ====
2026 Los Angeles City Council District 9 election
Candidate	Votes	%
Jose Ugarte	8,009	39.37
Estuardo Mazariegos	5,340	26.25
Jorge Nuño	2,218	10.90
Elmer Roldan	1,948	9.58
Martha Sánchez	1,784	8.77
Jorge Hernandez Rosas	1,042	5.12
Total votes	20,341	100.00
General election
Jose Ugarte		
Estuardo Mazariegos		
Total votes		

=== District 11 ===
Los Angeles City Council District 11 election
- June 2, 2026; November 3, 2026
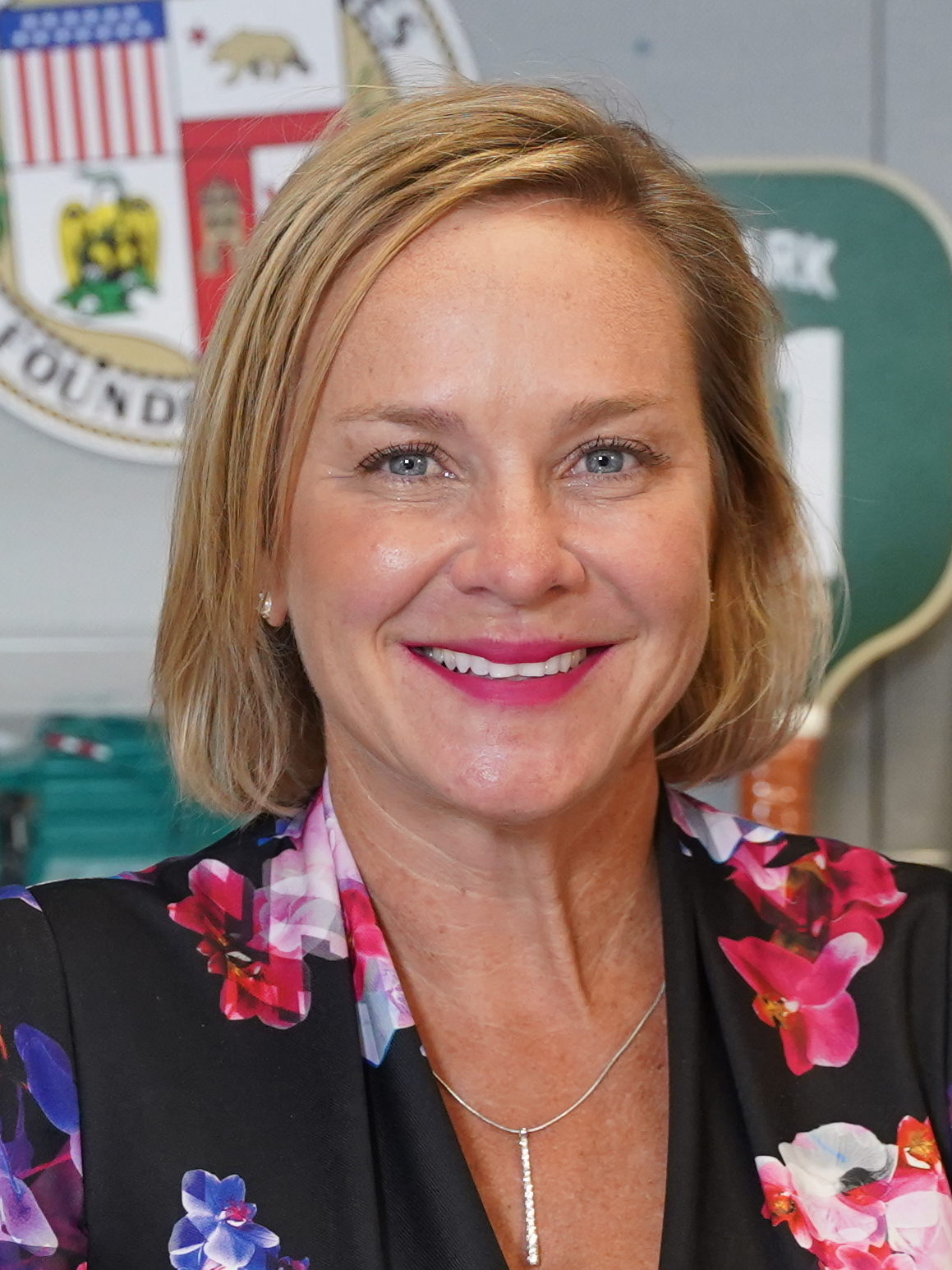

Candidate	Traci Park	Faizah Malik
Popular vote	51,964	34,313
Percentage	60.2%	39.8%
Councilmember before election
Traci Park
Elected Councilmember
Traci Park

The 11th district is located in the Westside region and includes the neighborhoods of Pacific Palisades, Brentwood, Sawtelle, Venice, Playa del Rey, Playa Vista, Westchester, and the Los Angeles International Airport. The incumbent is Traci Park, who was first elected in 2022 after defeating attorney Erin Darling. Park ran for re-election and won outright against civil rights attorney Faizah Malik.

==== Candidates ====
===== Declared =====
- Faizah Malik, civil rights attorney
- Traci Park, incumbent councilmember

===== Disqualified =====
- Jeremy Wineberg, entrepreneur

==== Endorsements ====
Traci Park

Labor unions

- Los Angeles Police Protective League
- United Firefighters of Los Angeles City
Faizah Malik

U.S. senators

- Bernie Sanders, Vermont (2007–present) (Independent)

Local officials

- Mike Bonin, former city councilmember from the 11th district (2013-2022)

Labor unions

- Los Angeles County Federation of Labor
- UNITE HERE Local 11
- United Auto Workers Region 6

Organizations

- Los Angeles Democratic Socialists of America

==== Results ====
2026 Los Angeles City Council District 5 election
Candidate	Votes	%
Traci Park (incumbent)	51,964	60.23
Faizah Malik	34,313	39.77
Total votes	86,277	100.00

=== District 13 ===
Los Angeles City Council District 13 election
- June 2, 2026; November 3, 2026
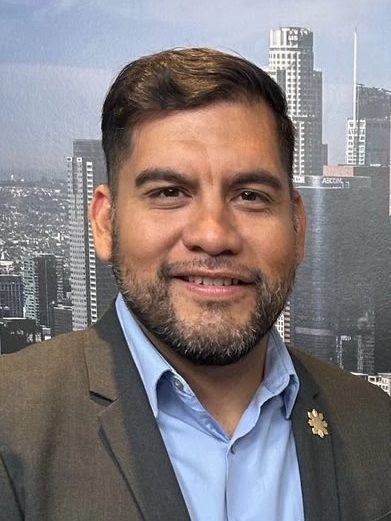

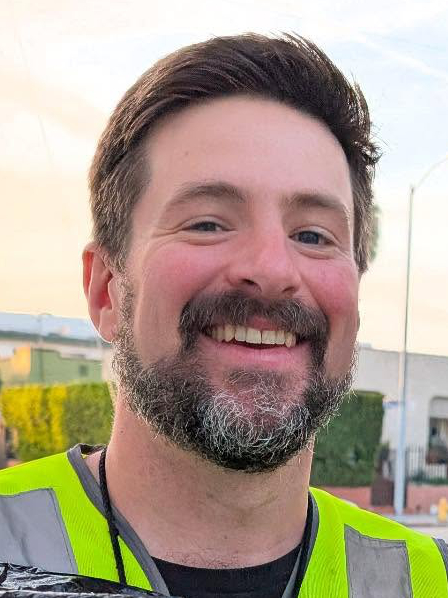
Candidate	Hugo Soto-Martinez	Dylan Kendall
Popular vote	38,748	6,769
Percentage	68.5%	12.0%
Candidate	Rich Sarian	Colter Carlisle
Popular vote	6,550	4,532
Percentage	11.6%	8.0%
Councilmember before election
Hugo Soto-Martinez
Elected Councilmember
Hugo Soto-Martinez

The 13th district is located northwest of Downtown in Central Los Angeles includes the neighborhoods of Hollywood, Silver Lake, Echo Park and Atwater Village. The incumbent is Hugo Soto-Martinez, who was first elected in 2022 after defeating incumbent Mitch O'Farrell. He has declared his intention to run for re-election, facing a challenge from Colter Carlisle, the vice president of the East Hollywood Neighborhood Council. Carlisle is also Soto-Martinez's upstairs neighbor in their East Hollywood apartment complex, which the Los Angeles Times noted as the first time "that a council member will face off against their upstairs neighbor." Soto-Martinez won outright against Carlisle and two other challengers in the primary.

==== Candidates ====
===== Declared =====
- Colter Carlisle, vice president of the East Hollywood Neighborhood Council
- Hugo Soto-Martinez, incumbent councilmember
- Rich Sarian, member of the Hollywood Police Activities League board
- Dylan Kendall, former Hollywood Chamber of Commerce staffer

===== Disqualified =====
- Sebastian Davis, community safety advocate
- Gregory Downer, district improvement advocate
- Kristen Suszek, creative director
- Gilbert Vitela Jr., military veteran
- Nikos Constant, attorney and member of the Silver Lake Neighborhood Council

==== Endorsements ====
Hugo Soto-Martinez

U.S. senators

- Bernie Sanders, Vermont (2007–present) (Independent)

Labor unions

- Los Angeles County Federation of Labor
- United Auto Workers Region 6
- United Teachers Los Angeles

Organizations

- Los Angeles Democratic Socialists of America

Political parties

- Los Angeles County Democratic Party
- California Working Families Party

==== Results ====
2026 Los Angeles City Council District 13 election
Candidate	Votes	%
Hugo Soto-Martinez (incumbent)	38,748	68.46
Dylan Kendall	6,769	11.96
Rich Sarian	6,550	11.57
Colter Carlisle	4,532	8.01
Total votes	56,599	100.00

=== District 15 ===
Los Angeles City Council District 15 election
- June 2, 2026; November 3, 2026
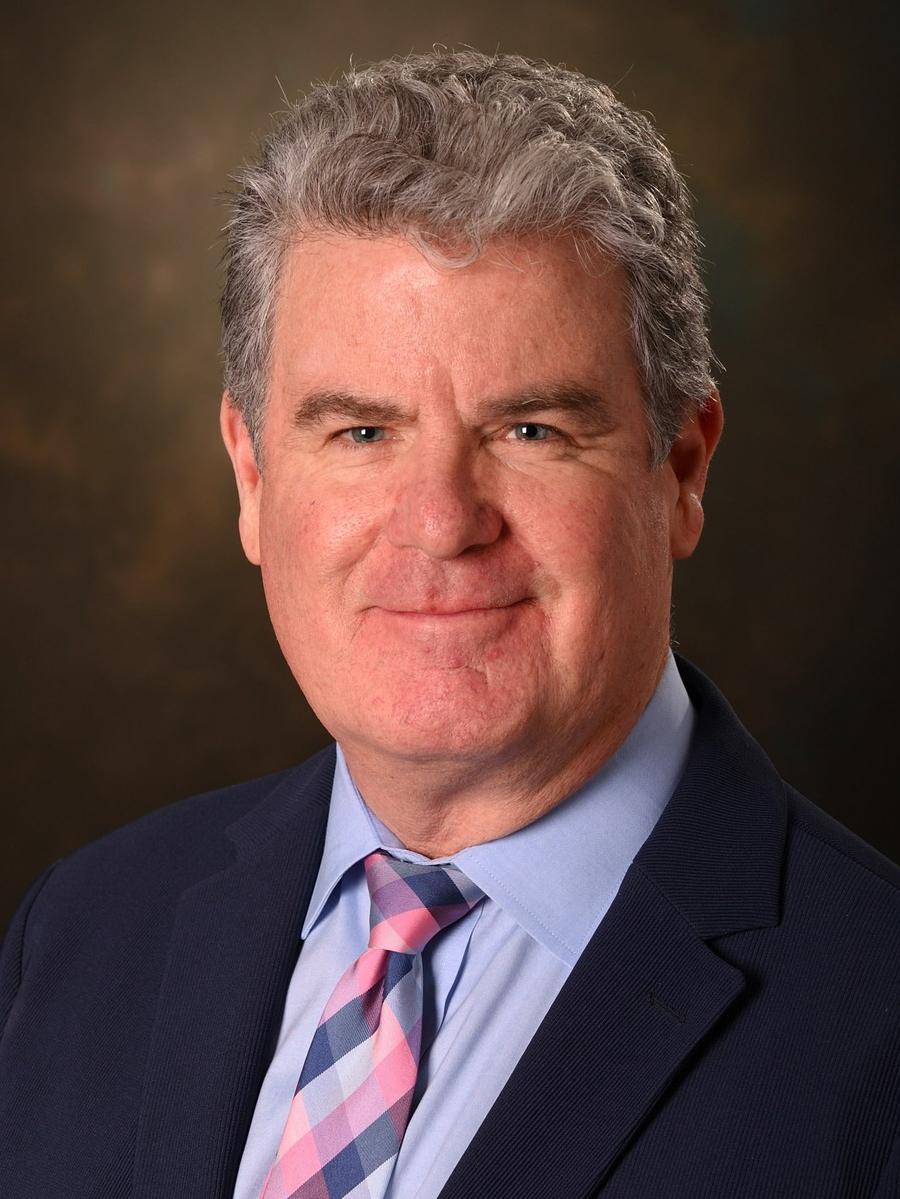

Candidate	Tim McOsker	Jordan Rivers
Popular vote	28,824	8,831
Percentage	76.6%	23.4%
Councilmember before election
Tim McOsker
Elected Councilmember
Tim McOsker

The 15th district is located in the Southern and Harbor Regions of Los Angeles, which includes the neighborhoods of Watts, Harbor Gateway, Harbor City, Wilmington, San Pedro, and the Port of Los Angeles. The incumbent is Tim McOsker, who was first elected in 2022 replacing Joe Buscaino. McOsker ran for re-election and won outright in the primary against community advocate Jordan Rivers.

==== Candidates ====
===== Declared =====
- Tim McOsker, incumbent councilmember
- Jordan Rivers, community advocate

===== Disqualified =====
- Philip Crouch Jr., homeless shelter director

==== Endorsements ====
Tim McOsker

Labor unions

- Los Angeles County Federation of Labor

Political parties

- Los Angeles County Democratic Party

==== Results ====
2026 Los Angeles City Council District 3 election
Candidate	Votes	%
Tim McOsker (incumbent)	28,824	76.55
Jordan Rivers	8,831	23.45
Total votes	37,655	100.00

== LAUSD Board of Education ==
=== District 2 ===
LAUSD Board of Education District 2 election
- June 2, 2026
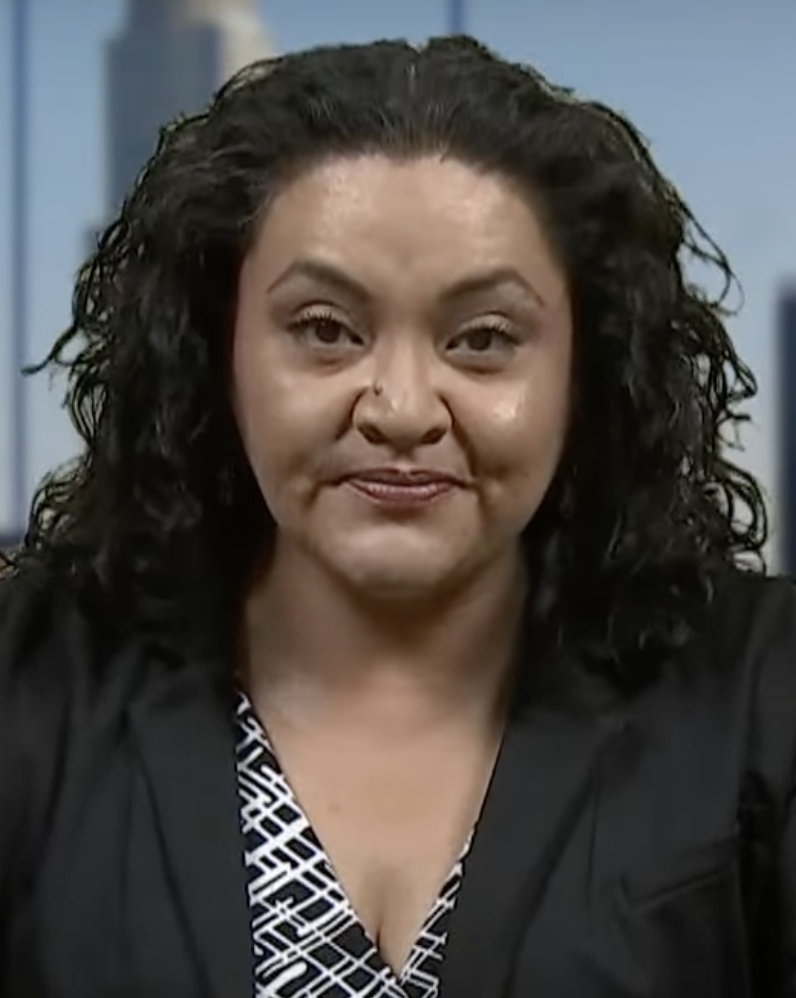

Candidate	Rocío Rivas	Raquel Zamora
Popular vote	64,424	35,670
Percentage	64.5%	35.6%
Board member before election
Rocío Rivas
Elected Board member
Rocío Rivas

LAUSD's 2nd district includes the neighborhoods of Glassell Park, Cypress Park, El Sereno, Lincoln Heights, Boyle Heights, Westlake, East Los Angeles, and Downtown Los Angeles. The incumbent is Rocío Rivas, who was first elected in 2022 defeating Maria Brenes. Rivas ran for re-election and won outright against teacher Raquel Zamora in the primary.

==== Candidates ====
===== Declared =====
- Rocío Rivas, incumbent board member
- Raquel Zamora, public school teacher

===== Disqualified =====
- Joseph Quintana, executive and education advocate

==== Endorsements ====
Rocío Rivas

Labor unions

- Los Angeles County Federation of Labor
- United Teachers Los Angeles

Organizations

- Los Angeles Democratic Socialists of America

Political parties

- California Working Families Party

==== Results ====
2026 LAUSD Board of Education District 2 election
Candidate	Votes	%
Rocío Rivas (incumbent)	64,424	64.36
Raquel Zamora	35,670	35.64
Total votes	100,094	100.00

=== District 4 ===
LAUSD Board of Education District 4 election
- June 2, 2026; November 3, 2026
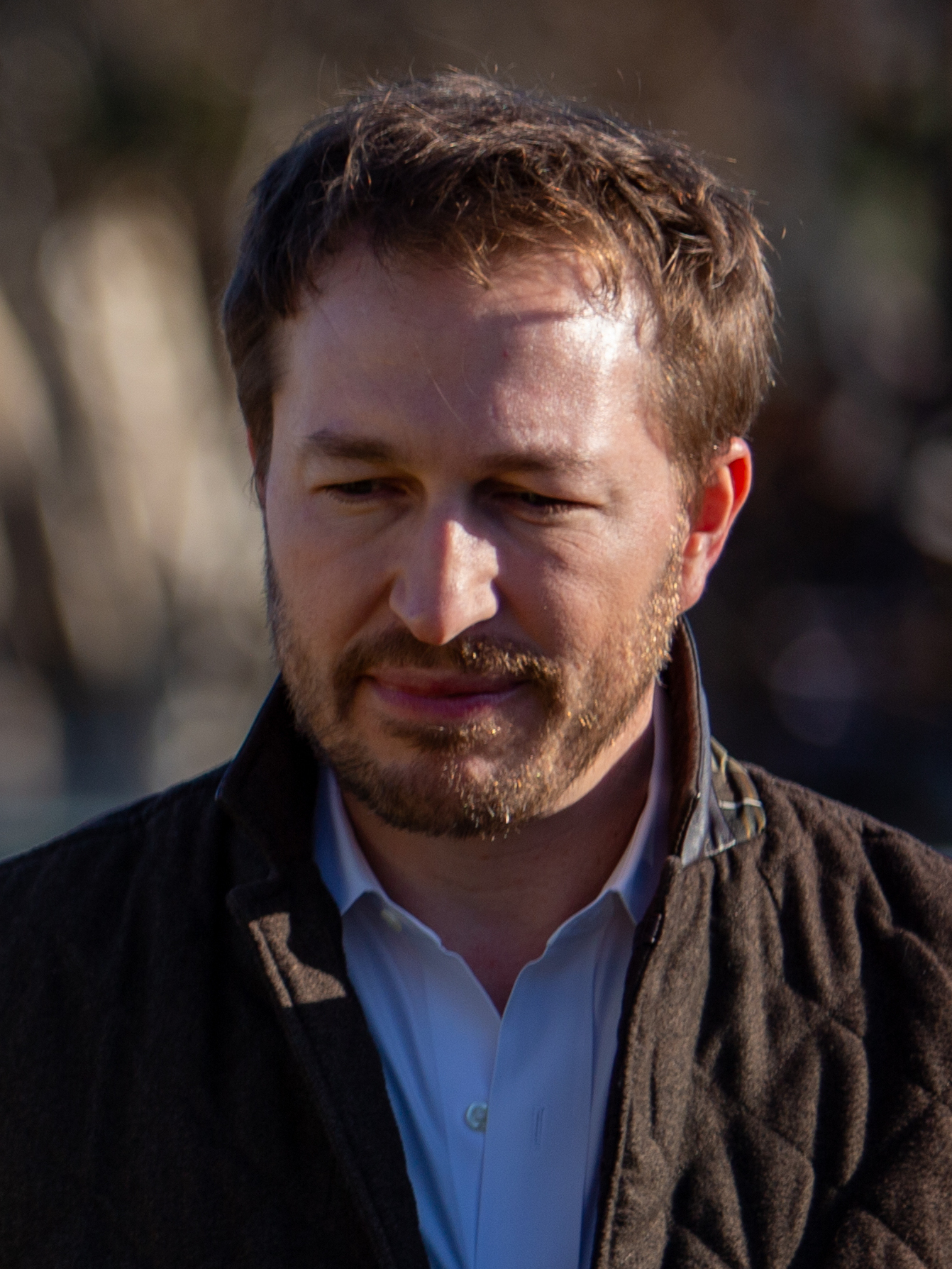

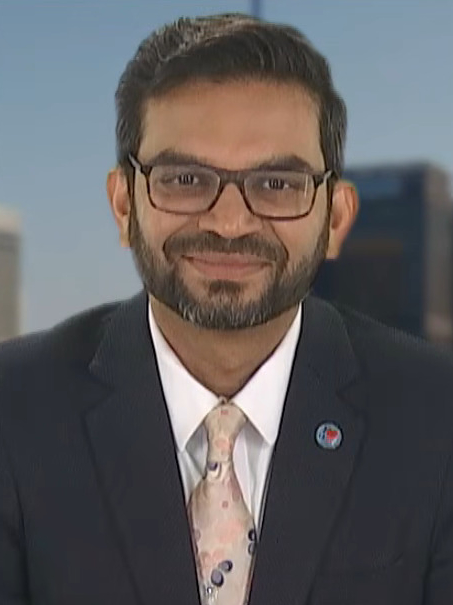
Candidate	Nick Melvoin	Ankur Patel
Popular vote	104,167	64,992
Percentage	61.6%	38.4%
Board member before election
Nick Melvoin
Elected Board member
Nick Melvoin

LAUSD's 4th district encompasses the neighborhoods of Pacific Palisades, Brentwood, Westwood, Venice, Mar Vista, Playa Vista, Westchester, Palms, Century City, Pico-Robertson, and the Fairfax District, as well as the cities of West Hollywood and Beverly Hills. The incumbent is Nick Melvoin, who was first elected in 2017 and re-elected in 2022. Melvoin ran for re-election and won outright against teacher Ankur Patel.

==== Candidates ====
===== Declared =====
- Nick Melvoin, incumbent board member
- Ankur Patel, teacher and outreach director

===== Disqualified =====
- Benjamin-Shalom Rodriguez, artist and professor

==== Endorsements ====
Nick Melvoin

Labor unions

- California School Employees Association Los Angeles 500
- LA/OC Building and Construction Trades Council
- Teamsters Local 572

Newspapers

- Los Angeles Daily News

==== Results ====
2026 LAUSD Board of Education District 4 election
Candidate	Votes	%
Nick Melvoin	104,167	61.58
Ankur Patel	64,992	38.42
Total votes	169,159	100.00

=== District 6 ===
LAUSD Board of Education District 6 election
- June 2, 2026; November 3, 2026
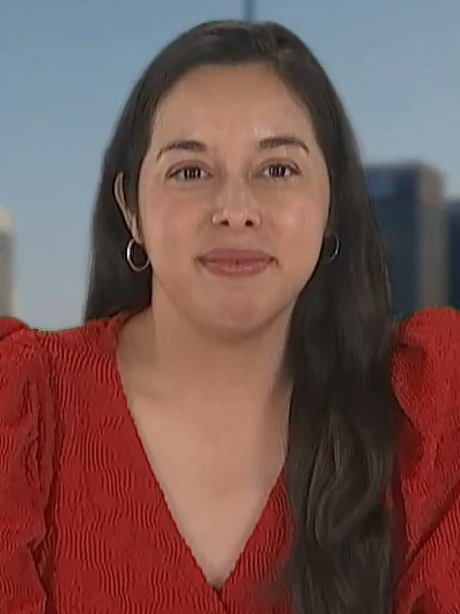
Candidate	Kelly Gonez
Popular vote	82,226
Percentage	100.0%
Board member before election
Kelly Gonez
Elected Board member
Kelly Gonez

LAUSD's 6th district includes Sylmar, San Fernando, Pacoima, Arleta, Sun Valley, Sunland-Tujunga, Panorama City, North Hills, Van Nuys, and North Hollywood. The incumbent is Kelly Gonez, who was first elected in 2017 and re-elected in 2022. Kelly ran for re-election and won unopposed.

==== Candidates ====
===== Declared =====
- Kelly Gonez, incumbent board member

===== Disqualified =====
- John Perron, retired aerospace engineer

==== Endorsements ====
Kelly Gonez

Labor unions

- Los Angeles County Federation of Labor

Political parties

- Los Angeles County Democratic Party
- California Working Families Party

==== Results ====
2026 LAUSD Board of Education District 6 election
Candidate	Votes	%
Kelly Gonez	82,226	100.00
Total votes	82,226	100.00

== See also ==
- 2026 Los Angeles County elections
