= Menachem Creditor =

American rabbi, author and musician

Menachem Creditor is an American rabbi, author, and musician. He is the Pearl and Ira Meyer Scholar-in-Residence at UJA-Federation New York, and the founder of Rabbis Against Gun Violence. His work has appeared in the Times of Israel, the Huffington Post, the Jewish Week, the Jewish Daily Forward, the Wall Street Journal, and the New York Times.

== Career ==
Creditor received ordination from the Jewish Theological Seminary of America rabbinical school, after which his first job was as assistant rabbi at Temple Israel in Sharon, Massachusetts from 2002 to 2007, followed by rabbi of Congregation Netivot Shalom in Berkeley, California from 2007 to 2018. From 2013 to 2018 he was a frequent contributor to the Huffington Post. In 2018, he was named the Pearl and Ira Meyer Scholar-in-Residence of UJA-Federation of New York. In addition to his congregational career, he is a frequent speaker on questions of identity, leadership, activism and spirituality. His engagements include synagogues, college campuses, and communities. Creditor was named by Newsweek in 2013 as one of the Most Influential Rabbis in America.

=== Activism ===
In August 2012, Creditor traveled to Ghana, Africa, with American Jewish World Service, and has since become increasingly vocal on issues such as global slavery and urban gun violence, partnering with national faith-based organizing groups such as the PICO Network and Bend the Arc: A Jewish Partnership for Justice. He has twice been invited as an American faith leader to the White House, presenting "A Prophetic Response to Gun Violence" and the PICO interfaith "Healing the Soul of America from Gun Violence" statement. As an outcome of the clergy gathering, Creditor edited and published a collection of rabbinic voices as Peace in Our Cities: Rabbis Against Gun Violence. The book has been distributed to congressional leaders, and Creditor's contemporary "Prayer to end Gun Violence" has been distributed by interfaith organizations around the United States.

In August 2014, he edited and published in less than two days a collection entitled The Hope: American Jewish Voices in Support of Israel in solidarity with Israel during attacks from Hamas in Gaza. From 2014 to 2017, Creditor led the Progressive Rabbinic Mission to Israel through AIEF, AIPAC's educational foundation.

In March 2016, Creditor helped lead a rabbinic walk-out during the AIPAC Policy Conference in Washington, D.C. when Donald Trump took the stage. Then, following Trump's speech, Creditor addressed the 18,000 conference attendees calling upon them to reject "the politics of hate".

Following the Orlando nightclub shooting, Creditor edited a rapid-response book, Not by Might: Channeling the Power of Faith to End Gun Violence, including 62 faith leaders as contributors and a foreword by Shannon Watts, founder of Moms Demand Action.

On October 27, 2018, after a domestic terrorist murdered 11 worshipers in a mass shooting at Tree of Life Synagogue, Creditor spoke alongside Mayor Bill de Blasio, Cardinal Timothy M. Dolan, and other New York religious and elected leaders. Two months later, he published Holding Fast: Jews Respond to American Gun Violence, a collection of teenagers, rabbis and others from the Tree of Life community and beyond, calling as Jews for an end to American gun violence.

In 2022, Creditor published an anthology of his own writings on American gun violence, entitled Ending Gun Violence, with a foreword by Fred Guttenberg, an American gun violence activist whose daughter, Jaime, was murdered in the 2018 Stoneman Douglas High School shooting.

In 2023, after the October 7 Hamas attack on Israel, Creditor published Am Yisrael Chai: Essays, Poems, and Prayers, the first anthology about the massacre and war. He traveled to Israel on a solidarity mission the next week. In December he published a second volume of the anthology and followed these with a volume of his own poetry about Israel. During the 843 days that Israeli hostages captured on October 7 were held by Hamas forces, Creditor published 12 anthologies of testimony, prayer, and poetry by authors from around the world, standing in solidarity with Israel.

==== Political protests ====
Creditor has been described as "one of the most outspoken, activist rabbis, speaking and organizing on behalf of a range of progressive causes", "a vocal proponent of gay and women’s rights" and "a leading advocate of gay ordination".

Creditor was politically active during 2016 American presidential campaign, calling upon the American Jewish community to reject the candidacy of Trump. Upon Trump's election, Creditor collaborated with Rabbi David Paskin and released a compilation album entitled There is Hope, featuring the leading voices in American Jewish music and available for free download. The album was designed to support "anyone in need of reassurance and comfort in these uncertain times". In February 2017, Creditor also compiled and published a written collection of Jewish voices in opposition to Trump's election, entitled We Will Not Be Silent.

On February 6, 2017, Creditor was one of 19 American rabbis arrested at a protest against Trump's refugee ban in front of the Trump International Hotel in New York City.

==== Religious activism ====
Creditor first received national attention for his controversial 2005 speech at the biennial conference of the Conservative Movement, urging the expulsion of non-egalitarian congregations from the movement. He was a co-founder of ShefaNetwork: The Conservative/Masorti Movement Dreaming from Within, co-founder of KeshetRabbis: The Alliance of Gay-Friendly Conservative/Masorti Rabbis, and was the founding international co-chair of Rabbis for Women of the Wall. He appeared as a "central figure" in Josh Kornbluth's 2010 monologue Andy Warhol: Good for the Jews? and Kornbluth's 2013 monologue Sea of Reeds. He has been a trustee of American Jewish World Service (AJWS), co-chair of the Rabbinic advisory board of Shalom Bayyit and is the former chair of The Masorti Center.

=== Publications ===
Among his more than 40 published books and six albums of original Jewish music are A Year of Torah (2021), And Yet We Love: Poems (2016) with a foreword by Ruth Messinger (global ambassador for AJWS), and Olam Chesed Yibaneh/A World of Love (2002), considered a modern "Jewish anthem". He has published Siddur Tov LeHodot (2012), which is a transliteration of Siddur Sim Shalem for Shabbat and Festivals, and the children's books A Pesach Rhyme and Avodah: A Yom Kippur Story. During the COVID-19 pandemic, he co-edited with Sarah Tuttle-Singer a two-volume collection of reflections, poems and prayers with contributions from hundreds of authors in response to COVID-19, entitled When We Turned Within. Following the January 6, 2021, storming of the United States Capitol, Creditor published a rapid-response collection of rabbinic responses to the insurrection entitled Remember and Do Not Forget, co-edited with Rabbi Jesse Olitzky.

Following the 2025 Bondi Beach shooting in Sydney, Australia, Rabbi Creditor published We Will Prevail: Jewish Responses to Bondi Beach, an anthology of essays, poems and firsthand reflections brought together in the immediate wake of the antisemitic terror attack. The anthology, which includes a searing foreword by a survivor of the attack, Rabbi Creditor's brother-in-law Arsen Ostrovsky, frames Jewish vulnerability and steadfastness as inseparable, insisting that solidarity, memory and moral action are central to prevailing over antisemitism.

In 2026, Creditor co-edited American Torah at 250 with Rabbi Charles E. Savenor, Executive Director of Civic Spirit. Conceived by Savenor in connection with Civic Spirit’s engagement with civic education and America’s 250th anniversary, the project brought Savenor and Creditor together to develop, edit, and publish an anthology of original Torah reflections. Organized around the weekly Torah portions, the volume considers American democracy through Jewish commitments to liberty, justice, religious pluralism, and civic responsibility.

== Personal life ==
In November 2017, Creditor became engaged to singer Neshama Carlebach. They married in August 2018. In response to the October 7 attack on Israel, they worked together to raise awareness and support for those affected, especially the families of Israeli hostages.
