= Barri Worth Girvan =

American politician

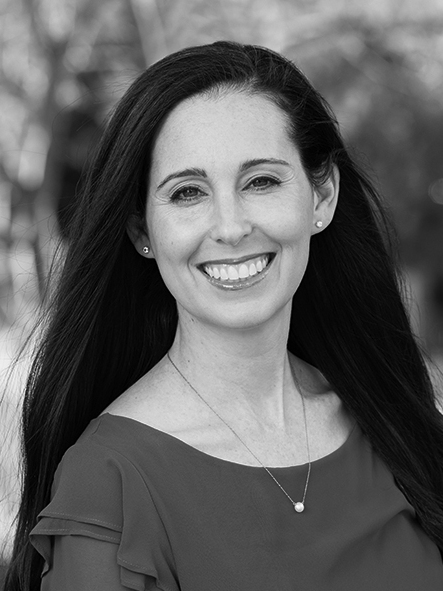
- Official portrait, 2024

Member of the Los Angeles City Council from the 3rd district
- Assuming office December 14, 2026
- Succeeding: Bob Blumenfield

Personal details
- Party: Democratic

Barri Worth Girvan is an American politician, who is the Los Angeles City Councilmember-elect for the 3rd district. A member of the Democratic Party, she will succeed term-limited Bob Blumenfield, after defeating Tim Gaspar in the 2026 election.

Worth Girvan served as the director of community affairs for Lindsey Horvath. She previously worked for Antonio Villaraigosa and as a staffer in the California State Legislature.
