= 2022 Los Angeles City Controller election =

American election

- November 8, 2022
- Registered: 1,608,639
- Turnout: 28.58%
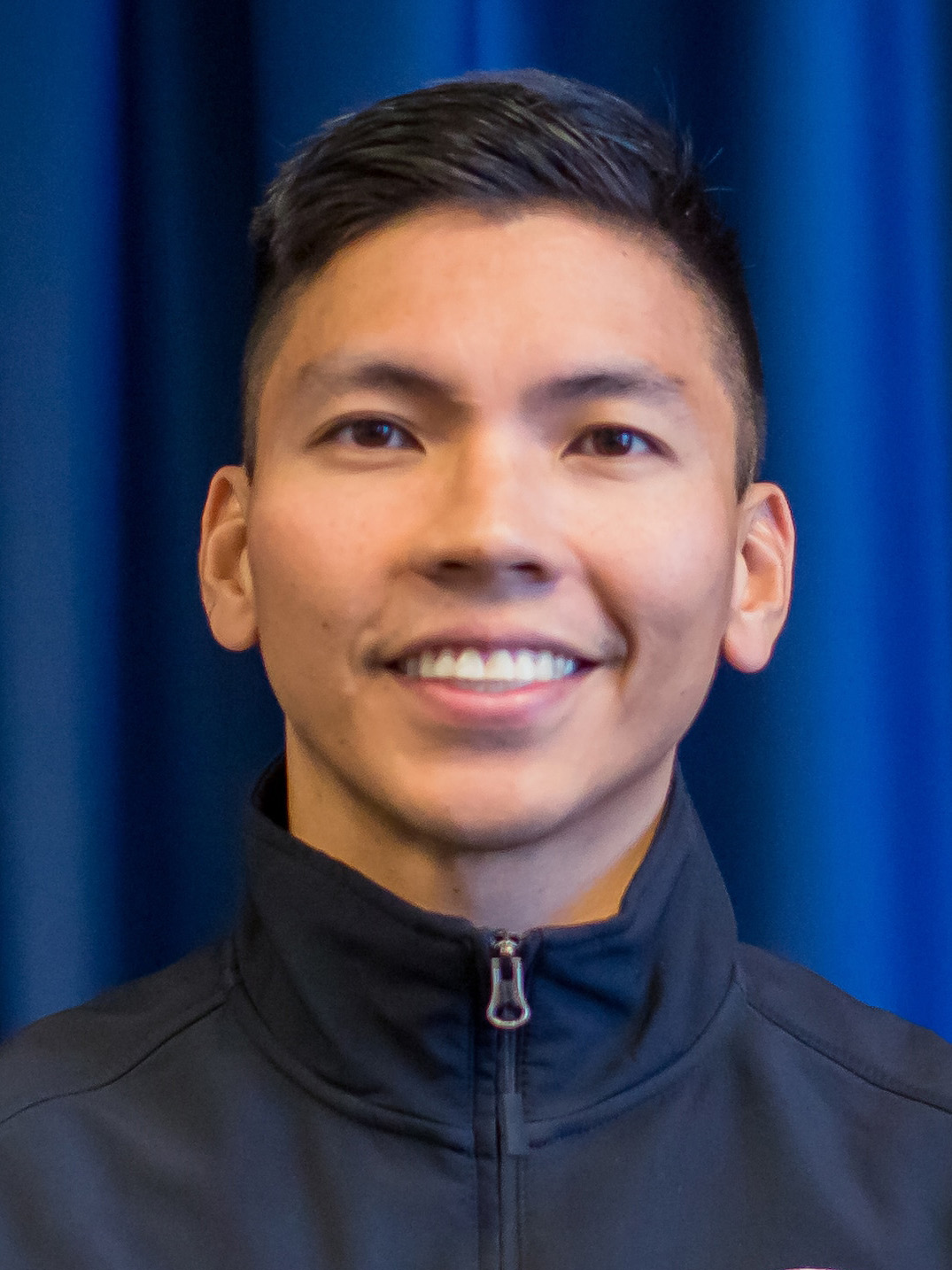

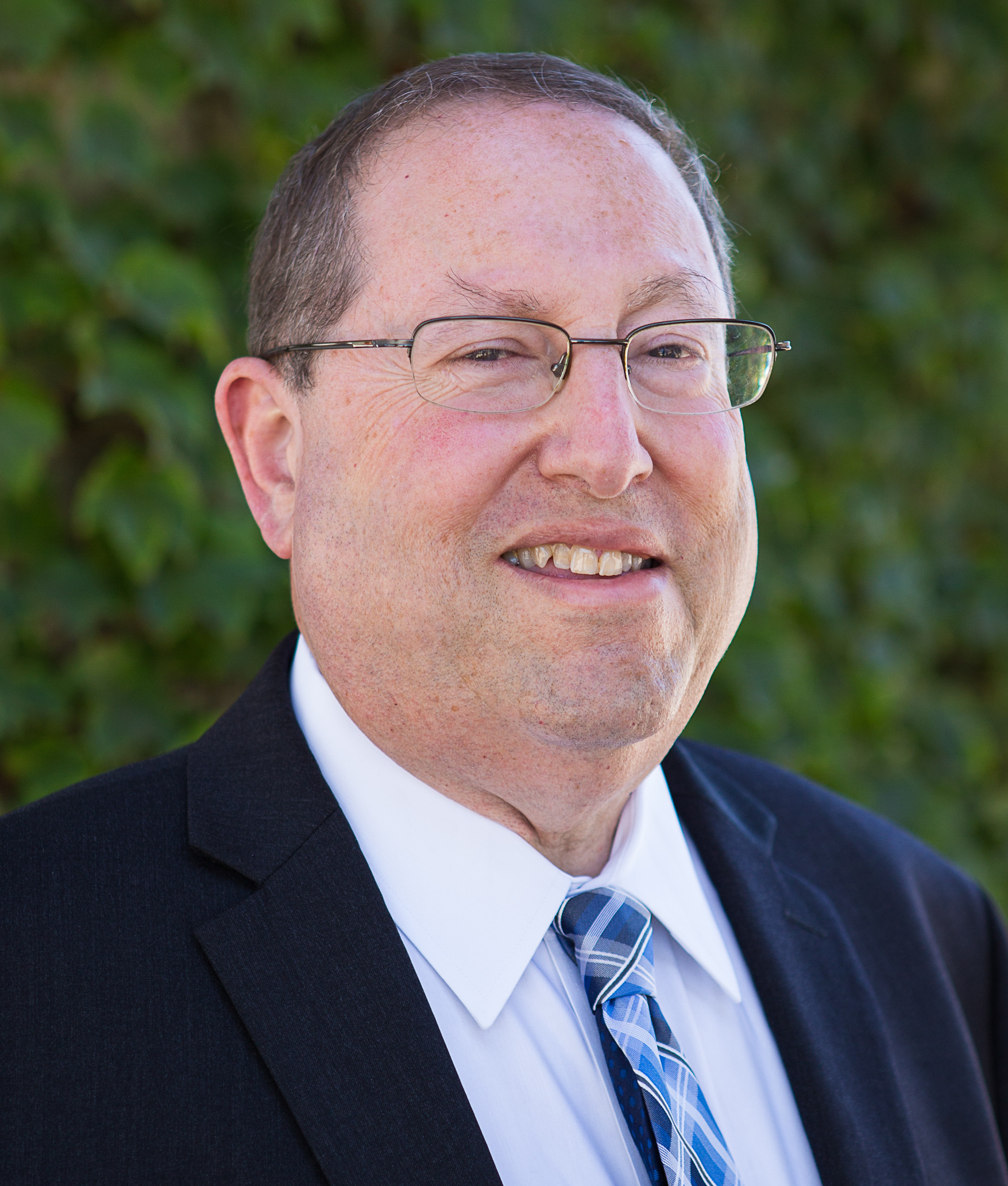

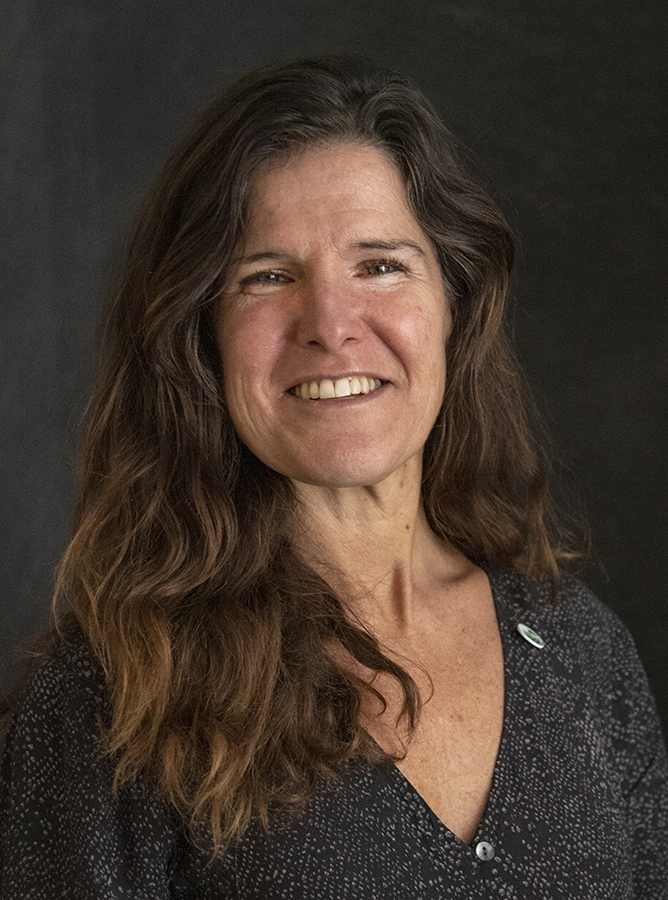

Candidate	Kenneth Mejia	Paul Koretz
First round	240,374; 43.12%	131,921; 23.67%
Runoff	509,757; 63.32%	295,338; 36.68%
Candidate	Stephanie Clements	David Vahedi
First round	88,678; 15.91%	39,240; 7.04%
Runoff	Eliminated	Eliminated
- Mejia: 30–40% 40–50% 50–60% 70–80% Koretz: 30–40%
City Controller before election
Ron Galperin
Elected City Controller
Kenneth Mejia

The 2022 Los Angeles City Controller election was held on held on November 8, 2022, to elect the Los Angeles City Controller. Incumbent City Controller Ron Galperin was unable to seek a third term due to term limits, and unsuccessfully ran for California State Controller. However, he was serving an extended second term due to a law that shifted election dates from an off-year election to a midterm and statewide election year. Certified Public Accountant Kenneth Mejia defeated city councilmember Paul Koretz to become the 20th City Controller.

Mejia and Koretz were the two frontrunners, with Mejia being a newcomer to city politics and Koretz being a veteran at a time of anti-incumbent sentiment. This sentiment was exacerbated by the subsequent City Council scandal in October. Mejia's campaign employed unconventional tactics such as displaying Los Angeles Police Department spending data on billboards, utilizing social media platforms like TikTok to interact with voters, and incorporating costumes and his two corgis into his campaign efforts.

In the runoff election, Mejia secured a landslide victory over Koretz, receiving the most votes of any controller candidate in city history, becoming the first Asian American to be elected to a citywide office and the first Filipino elected official in Los Angeles. He is also the youngest and the first person of color to hold the position of City Controller in over a century.

== Background ==
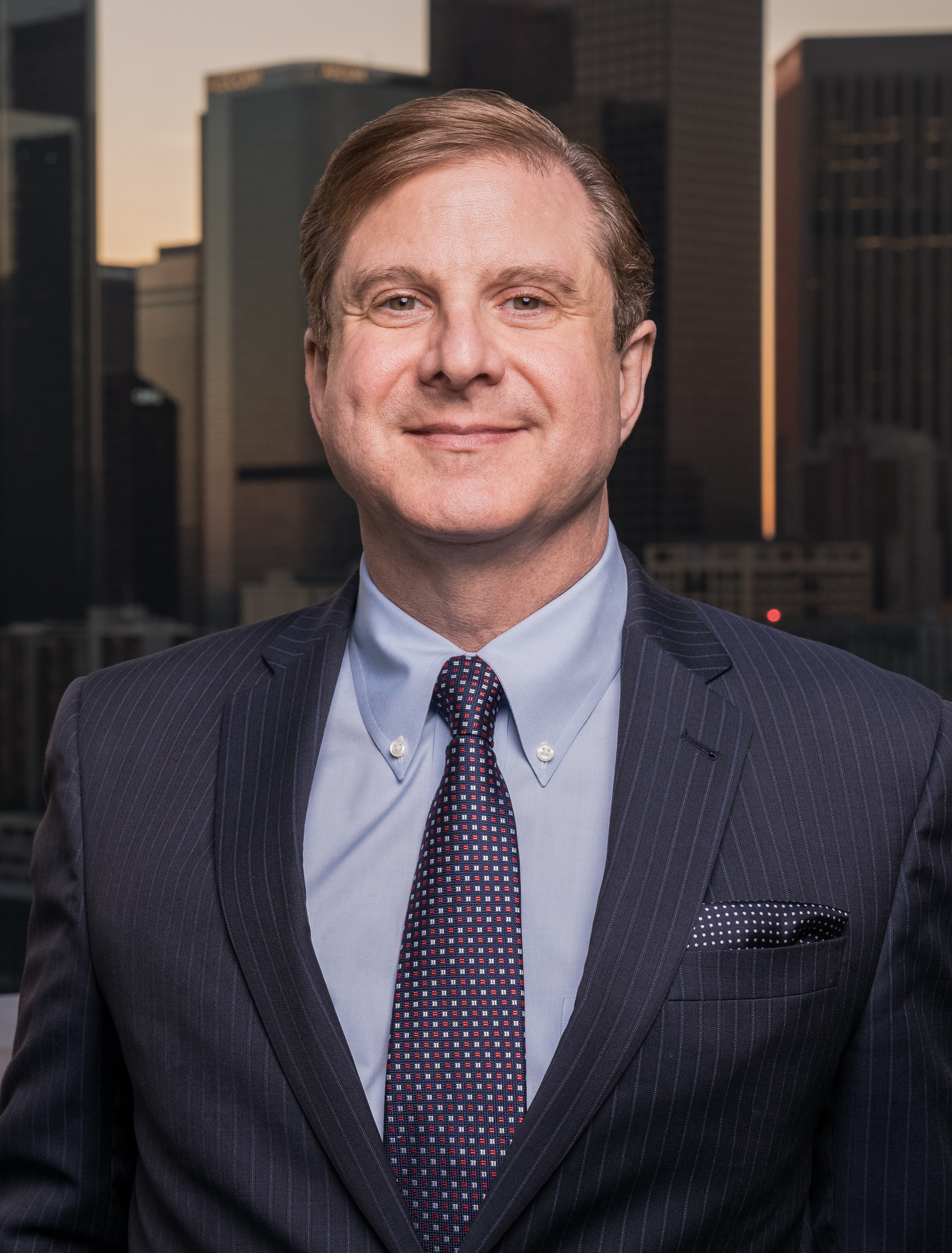
Incumbent City Controller Ron Galperin was termed out of office, but had been serving an extended term due to a change in election dates in the city.

The Los Angeles City Controller is an official in the city government, serving as the paymaster and chief accounting officer. Similar to the Mayor and City Attorney, the City Controller is elected by popular vote every four years, with a runoff election held if no candidate secures more than 50% of the vote. Elections in Los Angeles have been nonpartisan since 1909, meaning candidates' party affiliations do not appear on the ballot.

The incumbent City Controller was Ron Galperin, a member of the Democratic Party who was first elected to the position in 2013 and re-elected in 2017. He had been serving an extended second term due to a change in city election dates, aligning with midterm elections instead of off-year elections. However, due to city term limits, Galperin was unable to run for re-election. Instead, he chose to enter the California State Controller primary in 2022, where he placed fifth out of six candidates.

The race occurred against the backdrop of multiple corruption scandals within the Los Angeles government, including the audio scandal that would later happen after the primary election. The central question revolved around which candidate was best suited to provide oversight, act as a watchdog, and ensure transparency in city spending.

== Candidates ==
=== Advanced to runoff ===
- Paul Koretz, city councilmember for the 5th district
- Kenneth Mejia, Certified Public Accountant

=== Eliminated in primary ===
- Stephanie Clements, assistant director of Public Works
- Reid Lidow, scholar and aide to Eric Garcetti
- James O'Gabhann III, teacher and candidate for Indiana's 9th congressional district in 2020
- David T. Vahedi, co-founder of the Westside Neighborhood Council and two-time candidate for the 5th City Council district

=== Withdrawn ===
- Madeline Cortez Le, activist
- Rob Wilcox, spokesperson for the Los Angeles City Attorney (endorsed Koretz)

== Campaign ==
Mejia, a political newcomer, had previously worked as an auditor and ran for California's 34th congressional district three times, twice as a member of the Green Party. In contrast, Koretz was a political veteran with a career spanning from 1988, having served on the West Hollywood City Council, the California State Assembly, and the Los Angeles City Council. Mejia's campaign was noted for its unconventional tactics, focusing on educating voters about the role of the city controller and its significance within City Hall. The erected multiple billboards across the city highlighting Los Angeles Police Department funding data, including how the $317.4 million was allocated for LAPD officer salaries that year. Political veteran Rick Cole took notice of the billboards and reached out to Mejia, offering his assistance and advice. Later on, Mejia appointed Cole as the Deputy City Controller. Mejia also utilized social media platforms like TikTok to actively engage younger voters, encouraging their participation in the electoral process. He dressed up in a Pikachu suit while campaigning in Little Tokyo and featured his two corgis in campaign media.

In February 2022, Wilcox was the target of an unprovoked attack near City Hall, during which the assailant reportedly used a racial slur towards him. Months later, Wilcox dropped out of the race and endorsed Koretz, alleging that Mejia held alarming views. Wilcox cited Mejia's criticisms of Los Angeles' allocation of more than $3 billion in funding to the Los Angeles Police Department as a key concern. Mejia responded by asserting that City Hall insiders were expected to join forces against his campaign because he was an outsider. By the date of the primary, Mejia and Koretz emerged as the top two candidates, with Mejia securing the majority of votes ahead of Koretz.

On September 6, 2022, former City Controller Laura Chick, who held the office from 2001 to 2009, issued an open letter accusing Mejia of being an extremist and unfit for public office. In response, Mejia criticized the Koretz campaign, stating that they "enlisted another career politician" in an attempt to smear his campaign. On election day, Mejia was projected to win against Koretz. The day after, Koretz acknowledged that he wouldn't win against Mejia, stating that he didn't know if he would "bother to issue a concession statement" because he believed that people didn't want to hear from candidates for controller. With his win, Mejia became the first Asian American to hold a citywide office in Los Angeles, as well as the first Filipino elected official in the city. Mejia also received the most votes out of any controller candidate in city history.

=== Fundraising ===
Paul Koretz had a substantial lead in early fundraising, followed by David Vahedi and Kenneth Mejia. Candidates received 6-to-1 matching funds from the city, with Mejia receiving the most ($428,000).

== Endorsements ==
Stephanie Clements

Newspapers and other print media

- Los Angeles Daily News (endorsed Koretz after primary)
- The San Bernardino Sun
- Daily Breeze
- Inland Valley Daily Bulletin
Paul Koretz

U.S. senators

- Alex Padilla, U.S. senator for California

U.S. representatives

- Maxine Waters, U.S. representative for California's 43rd district

Statewide elected officials

- Ricardo Lara, 8th California Insurance Commissioner
- Fiona Ma, 34th California State Treasurer
- Betty Yee, 32nd California State Controller

State assemblymembers

- Anthony Rendon, 70th Speaker of the California State Assembly

Mayors

- Eric Garcetti, 42nd mayor of Los Angeles

City controllers

- Laura Chick, former Los Angeles City Controller
- Ron Galperin, incumbent Los Angeles City Controller
- Wendy Greuel, former Los Angeles City Controller
- Rick Tuttle, former Los Angeles City Controller

City councilmembers

- Bob Blumenfield, member of the Los Angeles City Council for the 3rd district
- Joe Buscaino, member of the Los Angeles City Council for the 15th district
- Kevin de León, member of the Los Angeles City Council for the 14th district
- Nury Martinez, President of the Los Angeles City Council
- Mitch O'Farrell, member of the Los Angeles City Council for the 13th district
- Curren Price, member of the Los Angeles City Council for the 9th district
- Monica Rodriguez, member of the Los Angeles City Council for the 7th district
- Herb Wesson, member of the Los Angeles City Council for the 10th district

Los Angeles County officials

- Yvonne Brathwaite Burke, former member of the Los Angeles County Board of Supervisors
- Janice Hahn, member of the Los Angeles County Board of Supervisors
- Ira Reiner, former Los Angeles County District Attorney
- Hilda Solis, Chair of the Los Angeles County Board of Supervisors

Individuals

- Dolores Huerta, labor leader

Labor unions

- Los Angeles County Federation of Labor
- Los Angeles Airport Peace Officers Association
- UNITE HERE Local 11
- United Farm Workers

Organizations

- Armenian National Committee of America Western Region
- Los Angeles County Democratic Party
- Los Angeles League of Conservation Voters
- Los Angeles Police Protective League

Newspapers and other print media

- Los Angeles Daily News (previously endorsed Clements)
Kenneth Mejia

State assemblymembers

- Isaac Bryan, state assemblyman for the 54th Assembly district
- Alex Lee, state assemblyman for the 25th Assembly district

City councilmembers

- Mike Bonin, member of the Los Angeles City Council for the 11th district

City officials

- Nika Soon-Shiong, Public Safety Commissioner of West Hollywood

Individuals

- Stephanie Clements, assistant director of Public Works and 3rd-place finisher in the primary election

Organizations

- California Working Families Party
- Jane Fonda Climate PAC
- Sunrise Movement Los Angeles

Newspapers and other media

- Los Angeles Times
- La Opinión
David Vahedi

U.S. representatives

- Diane Watson, former U.S. representative for California's 33rd district (2003–2011)

City councilmembers

- Bernard Parks, former member of the Los Angeles City Council for the 8th district

== Results ==
2022 Los Angeles City Controller primary election
Candidate	Votes	%
Kenneth Mejia	240,374	43.12
Paul Koretz	131,921	23.67
Stephanie Clements	88,678	15.91
David T. Vahedi	39,240	7.04
James O'Gabhann III	21,984	3.94
Reid Lidow	21,769	3.90
Rob Wilcox (withdrawn)	13,460	2.41
Total votes	557,426	100.00

2022 Los Angeles City Controller runoff election
Candidate	Votes	%
Kenneth Mejia	509,757	63.32
Paul Koretz	295,338	36.68
Total votes	805,095	100.00

== See also ==
- 2022 Los Angeles elections
