= Nick Melvoin =

American educator and politician

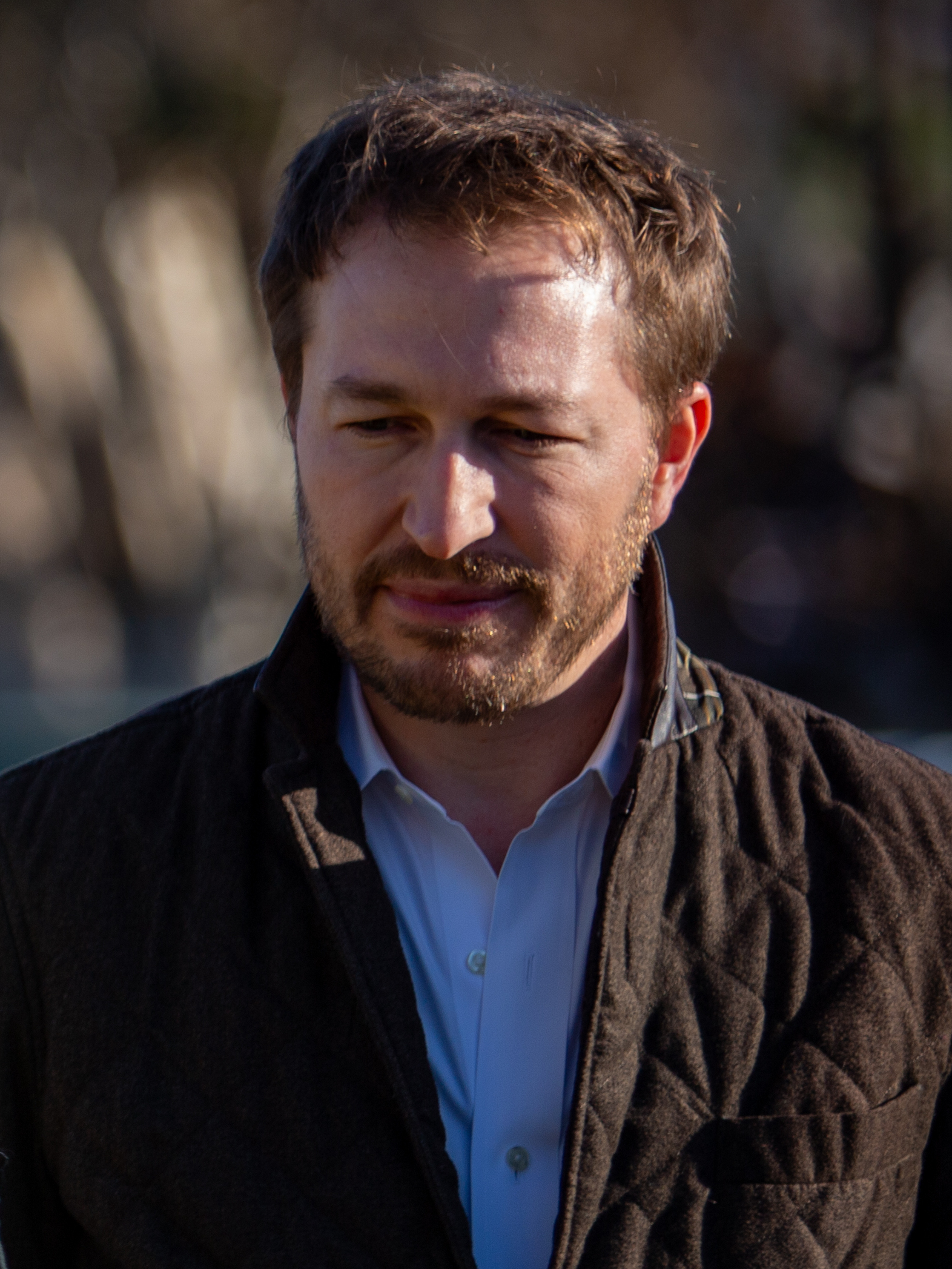
- Melvoin in 2025

Member of the LAUSD Board of Education from the 4th district
- Incumbent
- Assumed office July 6, 2017
- Preceded by: Steve Zimmer

Vice President of the LAUSD Board of Education
- In office July 6, 2017 – January 17, 2023
- President: Kelly Gonez
- Preceded by: George J. McKenna III
- Succeeded by: Scott Schmerelson

Personal details
- Born: Nicholas James Melvoin; 1985 (age 40–41) Los Angeles, California, U.S.
- Party: Democratic
- Parent: Jeff Melvoin (father)
- Education: Harvard University (BA); Loyola Marymount University (MA); New York University (JD)
- Website: Official website Campaign website

Nicholas James Melvoin (born 1985) is an American attorney, former teacher, and adjunct professor serving as member of the Los Angeles Unified School District Board of Education for District 4 since May 16, 2017. A member of the Democratic Party, Melvoin is the second youngest member of the board after Kelly Gonez.

== Early life and education ==
Melvoin was born in Brentwood, Los Angeles to television writer Jeff Melvoin and photojournalist Martha Hartnett Melvoin, and is the older brother of Charles "Charlie" Melvoin. He graduated from Harvard-Westlake School in 2004 and from Harvard University in 2008, earning a Master's degree from Loyola Marymount University and a Juris Doctor from the New York University School of Law.

== Career ==
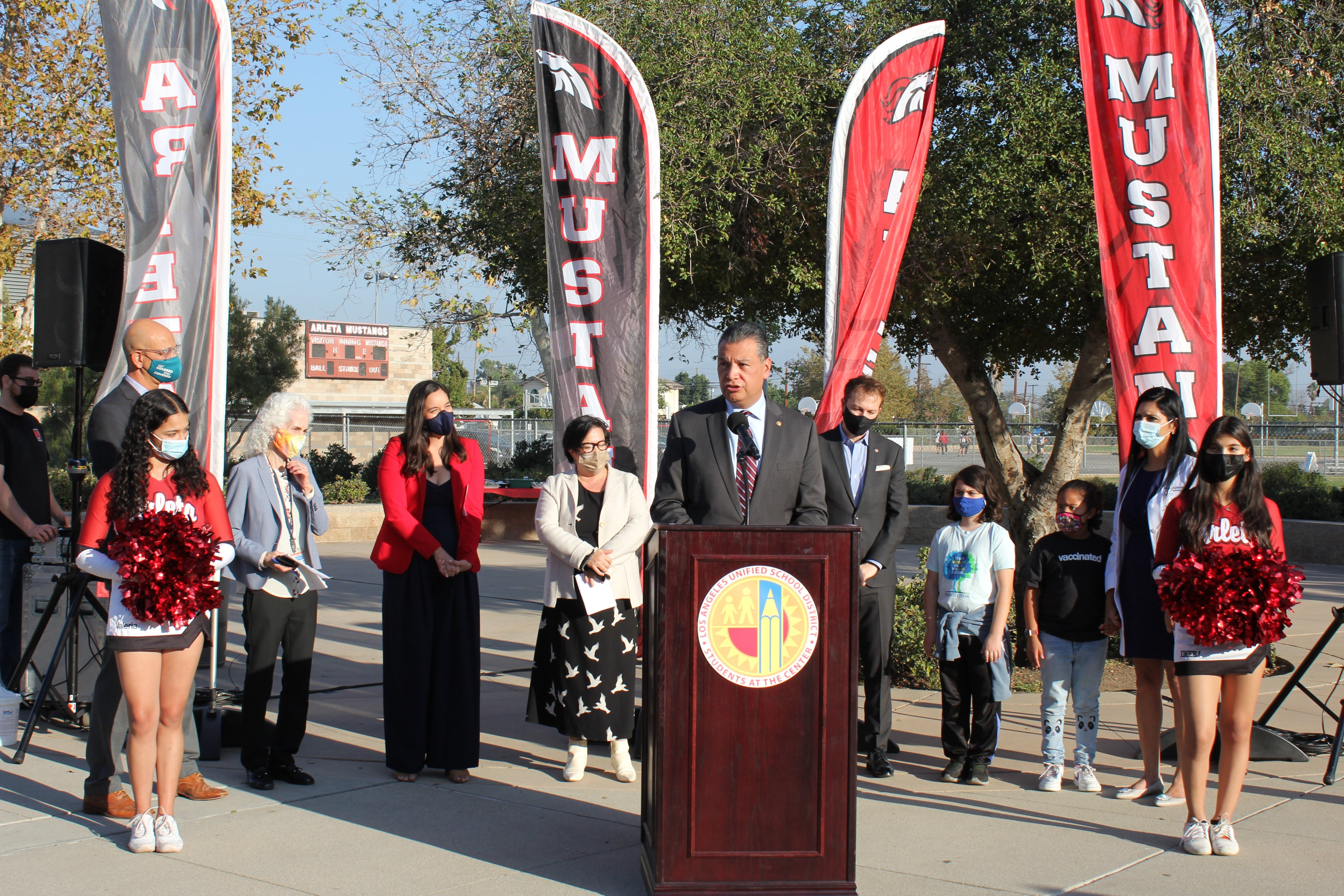
Melvoin, behind U.S. Senator Alex Padilla (to the right), with other LAUSD officials in 2021.

Melvoin started teaching at Edwin Markham Middle School through the Teach For America program and had served as a legal clerk for the American Civil Liberties Union. He was also the director of policy, communications and associate counsel for Great Public Schools Now and a consultant to Educators 4 Excellence and Teach Plus. After his first year at Markham Middle School, he was laid off along with 70% of teachers due to budget cuts. Melvoin worked on the ACLU's Reed v. California lawsuit, which challenged LAUSD's seniority-based teacher layoff policies, as well as testifying in the Vergara v. California lawsuit.

In 2016, Melvoin announced that he would be a candidate for the Los Angeles Unified School District Board of Education for District 4, held by member and Vice President of the Board Steve Zimmer. Melvoin said he ran because he realized that there "was a lot outside my classroom that was affecting what was happening inside." The race was joined by candidates Allison Holdorff Polhill and Greg Martayan. On February 23, 2017, all four candidates debated on the role of charter schools, undocumented students, and the budget for the District at a UCLA forum.

Melvoin and Zimmer competed in a runoff after the general election where Polhill and Martayan were eliminated. Melvoin was endorsed by the Daily Breeze, the Los Angeles Daily News, the Los Angeles Times, and HuffPost. Melvoin's campaign was criticized for receiving significant third-party spending support to defeat Zimmer, including the Walton family who spent more than $5 million for his campaign. The election itself was also criticized for being what was believed to be the most expensive school board election in U.S. history.

On May 17, 2017, Zimmer conceded to Melvoin in the race during a speech to his supporters, calling it devastating while saying that he would never run for office again. Melvoin won against Zimmer by fourteen points, and with his win, Melvoin replaced Zimmer as a board member for District 4. After the election, the charter-backed candidates, including Melvoin, had a majority on the Board of Education.

During the 2019 Los Angeles Unified School District teachers' strike, Melvoin said that the District couldn't afford the teacher's demands. In 2019, Melvoin announced that he would seek re-election, and was endorsed by Teamsters Local 572 in his successful campaign. He won re-election against two other candidates with nearly 60% of the vote. With the Board election, the teachers' union candidates won back control of the Board, and in 2023, Melvoin was replaced by Scott Schmerelson as the vice president of the Board of Education.

In 2023, Melvoin announced that he would run for California's 30th congressional district, an open seat vacated by incumbent Adam Schiff's run for Senate. He stated that he believed that his young age would match the voters' "desire for new blood and new vision." He lost the primary against Laura Friedman and Alex Balekian. He was re-elected to a third term on the LAUSD Board of Education in 2026, defeating Ankur Patel in the primary. His re-election and Kelly Gonez's re-election were marked by significantly less conflict between teachers union and charter school advocates compared to their previous elections.

== Electoral history ==
Electoral history of Kevin Kiley
Year	Office	Party	Primary			General			Result	Swing	Ref.
Year	Office	Party	Total	%	P.	Total	%	P.	Result	Swing	Ref.
2017	Board of Education	Nonpartisan	31,771	32.90%	2nd	38,673	57.23%	1st	Won	N/A	
2022	Board of Education	Nonpartisan	82,696	59.81%	1st	Runoff cancelled			Won	N/A	
2024	U.S. House	Democratic	2,218	2.4%	8th	Did not advance			Lost	Hold	
2026	Board of Education	Nonpartisan	103,620	61.64 %	1st	Runoff cancelled			Won	N/A	
