= Jeff Melvoin =

American screenwriter

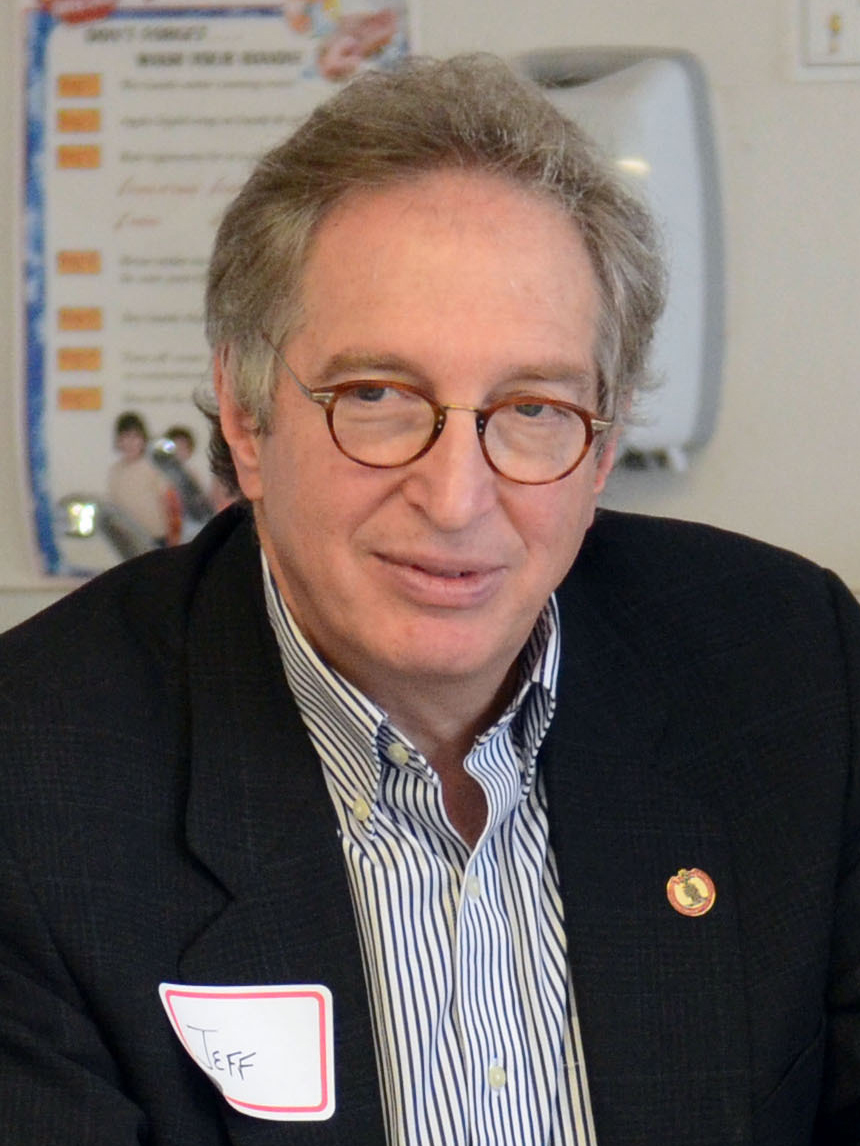
- Melvoin in 2012
- Born: Boston, Massachusetts, U.S.
- Education: Harvard University
- Occupations: Screenwriter, producer, teacher, journalist
- Spouse: Martha Melvoin
- Children: 2, including Nick
- Writing career
- Years active: 1983–present
- Website: www.jeffmelvoin.com

Jeff Melvoin is an American television writer, producer, and educator. He has written dozens and produced hundreds of one-hour episodes on over a dozen television series.

Melvoin is founder and chair of the Writers Guild of America's Showrunner Training Program and the Writers Education Committee. He is a past board member of the Mystery Writers of America (Southern California Chapter) and the Writers Guild of America, West.

== Early life and education ==
Melvoin was born in Boston, Massachusetts and grew up in Highland Park, Illinois. He attended Highland Park High School, and has attributed the birth of his creative career to his drama teacher Barbara Paterson. In high school, his fellow actors included Jeff Perry and Gary Sinise, two of the founding members of the Steppenwolf Theater Company.

Melvoin attended Harvard University, graduating magna cum laude in 1975 with a degree in American history and literature. He wrote his senior thesis on the development of the American detective in fiction. While in college, he also directed six theatrical productions, including two on the mainstage of Harvard's Loeb Theater.

== Career ==
=== Journalism ===
After college, Melvoin took a mini-MBA program at Keller Graduate School of Business Management in Chicago and was subsequently hired by Fairchild Publications (Women's Wear Daily, W) as a reporter for Fairchild News Service (FNS) in Washington, D.C. Shortly after, he was made FNS bureau chief in Miami.

In 1978, he was hired as a correspondent for Time magazine. He worked in their New York, Boston and Los Angeles bureaus before leaving the magazine in late 1982.

=== Television ===
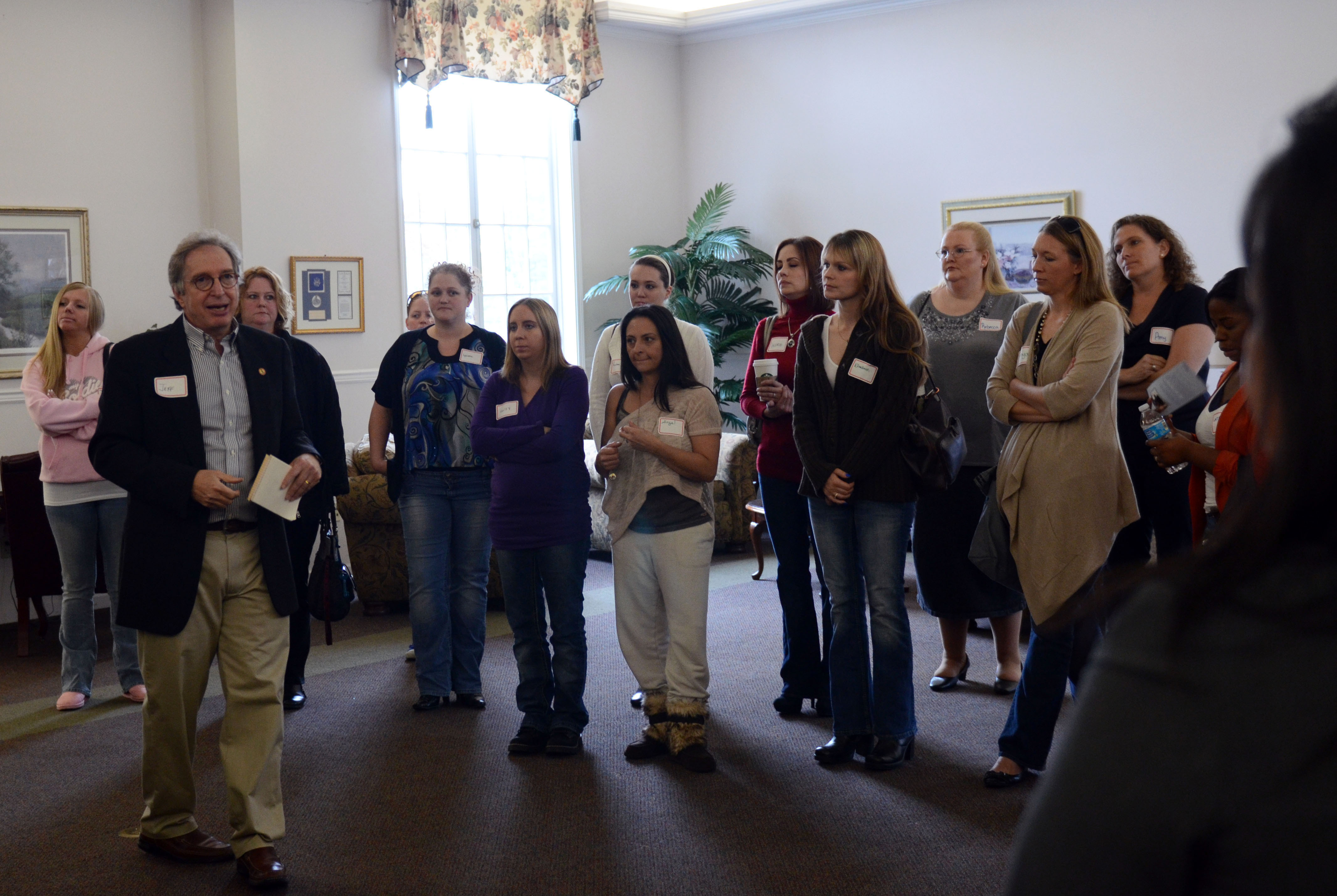
Melvoin speaking to Joint Base Lewis-McChord Army spouses in 2012.

Melvoin began his television career in 1983 as a staff writer for the lighthearted MTM detective show Remington Steele, joining the NBC series in its second season. He worked his way up to supervising producer by the end of the show's fourth season. In 1986, Melvoin became co-executive producer on the final season of the NBC police drama, Hill Street Blues, also produced by MTM.

Melvoin then began a four-year association with Columbia TriStar Television, developing original pilots. Three of his pilots were produced, but none were picked up to series. In 1991, Melvoin was hired as a writer-producer on the CBS comedy-drama Northern Exposure, produced by Universal Television. He worked on the series from episode 17 until the end four years later writing 18 episodes and rewriting a half-dozen others. During his time on the show, Melvoin received numerous awards and nominations, including an Emmy Award for best dramatic series, two Emmy nominations for best writing in a dramatic series, two Golden Globe awards and a Television Critics Association award for best dramatic series.

In 1995, Melvoin became Executive Producer on the fourth season of the David E. Kelley drama series, Picket Fences, produced by 20th Century Fox Television for CBS. It marked Melvoin's first showrunner position. Following Picket Fences, Melvoin signed an overall deal with Tristar Television and became a consultant on the light science fiction drama, Early Edition, for CBS. He took over the series as showrunner for seasons two through four, from 1997 to 2000.

In 2001, he was executive producer on the Showtime drama, Going to California, produced by Columbia TriStar Television, which lasted one season.

In 2003, he was executive producer on the ABC drama Line of Fire, produced by Touchstone Television. The FBI drama ran for 13 episodes. In 2004, Melvoin signed an overall deal with ABC Studios and became executive producer on season four of Alias, the J. J. Abrams spy drama produced by Touchstone Television for ABC.

Following that, Melvoin became executive producer on In Justice, a short-lived ABC series from The Good Wife creators Robert and Michelle King.

In 2007, Melvoin was hired as executive producer on Army Wives, produced by ABC Studios for the Lifetime Network. He ran the show in its first season, then left for other opportunities, returning to run the show for seasons three through seven, ending its run in 2013. In its day, Army Wives was the most successful one-hour drama in the history of the Lifetime network. After Army Wives, Melvoin has worked on his own development and a variety of other projects, including the Shane Black and Fred Dekker spaghetti western series, EDGE, developed for Amazon Studios in 2015–2016, but eventually shelved.

In December 2016, Melvoin was hired as the showrunner for ABC's Designated Survivor. He handled the second half of season 1 and stayed on as an executive producer for season 2. In 2019, Melvoin was hired as an executive producer for season three of BBC America's Killing Eve and received an Emmy nomination for his work.

=== Books ===
In September 2023, Melvoin's book, Running the Show: Television from the Inside, was published by Applause Books and has been a bestseller on Amazon in the “TV Direction and Production” category.

== Showrunner Training Program ==
In 2005, Melvoin approached Writers Guild of America West President John Wells to create a WGA Showrunner Training Program. In the face of a rapidly changing industry, Melvoin saw a need to compensate for the disappearance of the old, informal apprenticeship system in television writing-producing with an intense, master class program for selected candidates. Together, Melvoin and Wells successfully lobbied the Alliance of Motion Picture and Television Producers to fund the WGA's Showrunner Training Program.

Melvoin continues to chair the program, whose alumni include Lena Waithe, Tanya Saracho, Kenya Barris, Courtney Kemp Agboh, Matt Nix, Veena Sud, Gloria Calderon Kellett, and Aaron Korsh, among many others, who in the program's first seventeen years have gone on to create, co-create or executive-produce over 150 series.

In 2015, Melvoin was given the Morgan Cox Award, the WGA's highest recognition "to that member whose vital ideas, continuing efforts, and personal sacrifice best exemplify the ideal of service to the Guild." In announcing the award, WGA President Christopher Keyser said, "If this is a Golden Age of television, the program Jeff so lovingly shepherds deserves its fair share of credit. Thanks to him, as an art form and as a business, we are better at what we do."

Melvoin has taught at Harvard, USC School of Cinematic Arts, UCLA, and the Sundance Institute. Additionally, in 2004, Melvoin co-authored a WGA booklet, Writing for Episodic TV, which is still in print.

== Filmography ==
Production	Tenure	Network
Remington Steele	1983–1986	NBC
Hill Street Blues	1986–1987	NBC
Intrigue	1988	CBS
CBS Summer Playhouse: Outpost	1989	CBS
Northern Exposure	1991–1995	CBS
Picket Fences	1995–1996	CBS
Early Edition	1996–1999	CBS
Going to California	2001	Showtime
Mister Sterling	2003	NBC
Line of Fire	2003–2005	ABC
Alias	2005	ABC
In Justice	2006	ABC
Army Wives	2007, 2008–2013	Disney–ABC Domestic Television
Designated Survivor	2016–18	Disney–ABC Domestic Television/Netflix
Killing Eve	2019–2020	BBC America

== Awards ==
=== Killing Eve ===
  - Emmy Nomination, Outstanding Drama Series, 2020

=== Writers Guild of America ===
- Morgan Cox Award; "to that member whose vital ideas, continuing efforts, and personal sacrifice best exemplify the ideal of service to the Guild." 2015

=== Army Wives ===
- Inspire Award; Donate Life Hollywood; for stories that "entertain, enlighten, and inspire about organ and tissue donation." 2010
- Sentinel for Health Award for Daytime Drama; University of Southern California & Centers for Disease Control and Prevention; "for exemplary achievements of television storylines that inform, educate and motivate viewers to make choices for healthier and safer lives." 2010
- Voice Award, Substance Abuse and Mental Health Services Administration (U.S. Dept. of Health and Human Services); "to increase public understanding and acceptance of people in recovery from mental health and substance abuse problems." 2010

=== Northern Exposure ===
- Jewish Televimage Award, Best Episode - Drama, Shofar So Good, 1995
- Emmy Nomination, Outstanding Drama Series, 1994
- Environmental Media Award, 1993
- Emmy Nomination, Outstanding Drama Series, 1993
- Emmy Nomination Outstanding Individual Achievement in Writing in a Drama Series, Kaddish for Uncle Manny], 1993
- Television Critics Association Award, Program of the Year, 1992
- Golden Globe Award, Best Television Series - Drama, 1992
- Emmy Nomination, Outstanding Drama Series, 1992
- Emmy Nomination Outstanding Individual Achievement in Writing in a Drama Series, Democracy in America, 1992
- Golden Globe Award, Best Television Series - Drama, 1991

=== Hill Street Blues ===
- People's Choice Award, Favorite TV Dramatic Program, 1987

=== Remington Steele ===
- Edgar Allan Poe Special Award, Mystery Writers of America, Altered Steele, 1984

== Personal life ==
Melvoin and his wife, Martha Hartnett Melvoin, a former photojournalist for the Los Angeles Times, were married in 1984. The couple lives in Los Angeles, and have two sons, Nick and Charlie.
