= Los Angeles County Young Democrats =

Political organization in California

The Los Angeles County Young Democrats (LACYD) is a political organization in Southern California. It is an official Democratic Club, and is chartered with the California Young Democrats, the Democratic Party of the San Fernando Valley, and the Los Angeles County Democratic Party.

LACYD has more than 1,000 members and supporters. To be an active member, one must be a registered Democrat from 18 to 35 years of age.

== Founders ==
LACYD was founded in 1973 by Congressman Henry Waxman, Congressman Howard Berman, former Los Angeles City Controller Rick Tuttle, and others.

== Notable former board members ==
Notable former LACYD Executive board members include:

- Congressmember Howard Berman (co-founder)
- Congressmember Henry Waxman (co-founder)
- Los Angeles County Supervisor Zev Yaroslavsky
- Former Los Angeles City Controller Rick Tuttle (co-founder)
- Los Angeles Mayor Eric Garcetti

== Electoral activity ==
LACYD has been active in elections at the local, state, and national level since its founding. Members work for endorsed candidates, and representatives speak to other organizations and media outlets about the candidates and issues LACYD has endorsed. The group also organizes candidate forums and debates and takes positions on public issues.

Candidates have been known to go to great lengths to seek the group's endorsement, and cite the group's endorsement as a reason to vote for them.

On February 28, 2011, then LACYD President David Graham-Caso was quoted in the Los Angeles Daily News, advocating for Los Angeles Measure L, an initiative to restore funding to libraries.
