= Line of Fire (2003 TV series) =

2003 American crime drama series

- Genre: Crime drama
- Created by: Rod Lurie
- Starring: Leslie Bibb; Anson Mount; Leslie Hope; Jeffrey D. Sams; Julie Ann Emery; Brian Goodman; Michael Irby; David Paymer
- Composer: Larry Groupé
- Country of origin: United States
- Original language: English
- No. of seasons: 1
- No. of episodes: 13 (2 unaired)

Production
- Executive producers: Marc Frydman; Rod Lurie; Jeff Melvoin
- Running time: 60 minutes
- Production companies: Battleplan Productions; DreamWorks Television; Touchstone Television

Original release
- Network: ABC
- Release: December 2, 2003 – May 30, 2004

Line of Fire is an American crime drama television series that was produced by Battleplan Productions, DreamWorks Television and Touchstone Television and broadcast on ABC for 11 episodes from December 2, 2003 to May 30, 2004. It starred Leslie Bibb and Jeffrey D. Sams.

The show was canceled after just 9 episodes, although an additional two episodes were burned off in May 2004 as a two hour movie event. The final two episodes were unaired in the United States.

== Plot ==
Two rookie FBI agents, Paige Van Doren and Todd Stevens, are assigned to the bureau's Richmond, Virginia field office, where their story parallels that of a local mob boss, Jonah Malloy. When a fellow agent is murdered in a shootout with the gangsters, the head of the FBI branch, Lisa Cohen, declares an all-out war on the criminal underworld. The following episodes weaved intricately between Bibb and Sams' federal agency and Paymer's gang, though the two storylines rarely met head-on, except when occasionally focusing on an undercover agent, Roy Ravelle.

Mob boss Malloy's signature line was "That's that with that."

== Cast ==
- Leslie Bibb as Paige Van Doren
- Anson Mount as Roy Ravelle
- Leslie Hope as Lisa Cohen
- Jeffrey D. Sams as Todd Stevens
- Julie Ann Emery as Jennifer Sampson
- Brian Goodman as Donovan Stubbin
- Michael Irby as Amiel Macarthur
- David Paymer as Jonah Malloy

== Episodes ==
No.	Title	Directed by	Written by	Original release date	Prod. code
1	"Pilot"	Rod Lurie	Rod Lurie	December 2, 2003	001
2	"Take the Money and Run"	Peter Horton	Reed Steiner	December 9, 2003	003
3	"Undercover Angel"	Rod Lurie	Rod Lurie	December 16, 2003	002
4	"Mockingbird"	Rod Lurie	Jeff Melvoin	December 23, 2003	009
5	"Boom, Swagger, Boom"	Elodie Keene	Chris Mundy	December 30, 2003	004
6	"The Best-Laid Plans"	Rod Lurie	Wendy West	January 6, 2004	005
7	"I'm Your Boogie Man"	Daniel Attias	Janet Tamaro	January 13, 2004	006
8	"Mother & Child Reunion"	Kevin Hooks	Reed Steiner & Chris Mundy	January 27, 2004	007
9	"The Senator"	Rod Lurie	Story by : Yolonda Lawerence; Teleplay by : Rod Lurie & Jeff Melvoin	February 3, 2004	008
10	"Eminence Front: Parts 1 & 2"	Rod Lurie	Reed Steiner & Rod Lurie	May 30, 2004	010
11	"Eminence Front: Parts 1 & 2"	Rod Lurie	Story by : Brandon Hill & Kurt Spenser; Teleplay by : Rod Lurie	May 30, 2004	011
12	"Born to Run"	Tim Hunter	Wendy West & Janet Tamaro	UNAIRED	012
13	"This Land Is Your Land"	Greg Yaitanes	Jeff Melvoin	UNAIRED	013
