= Rick Tuttle =

American politician

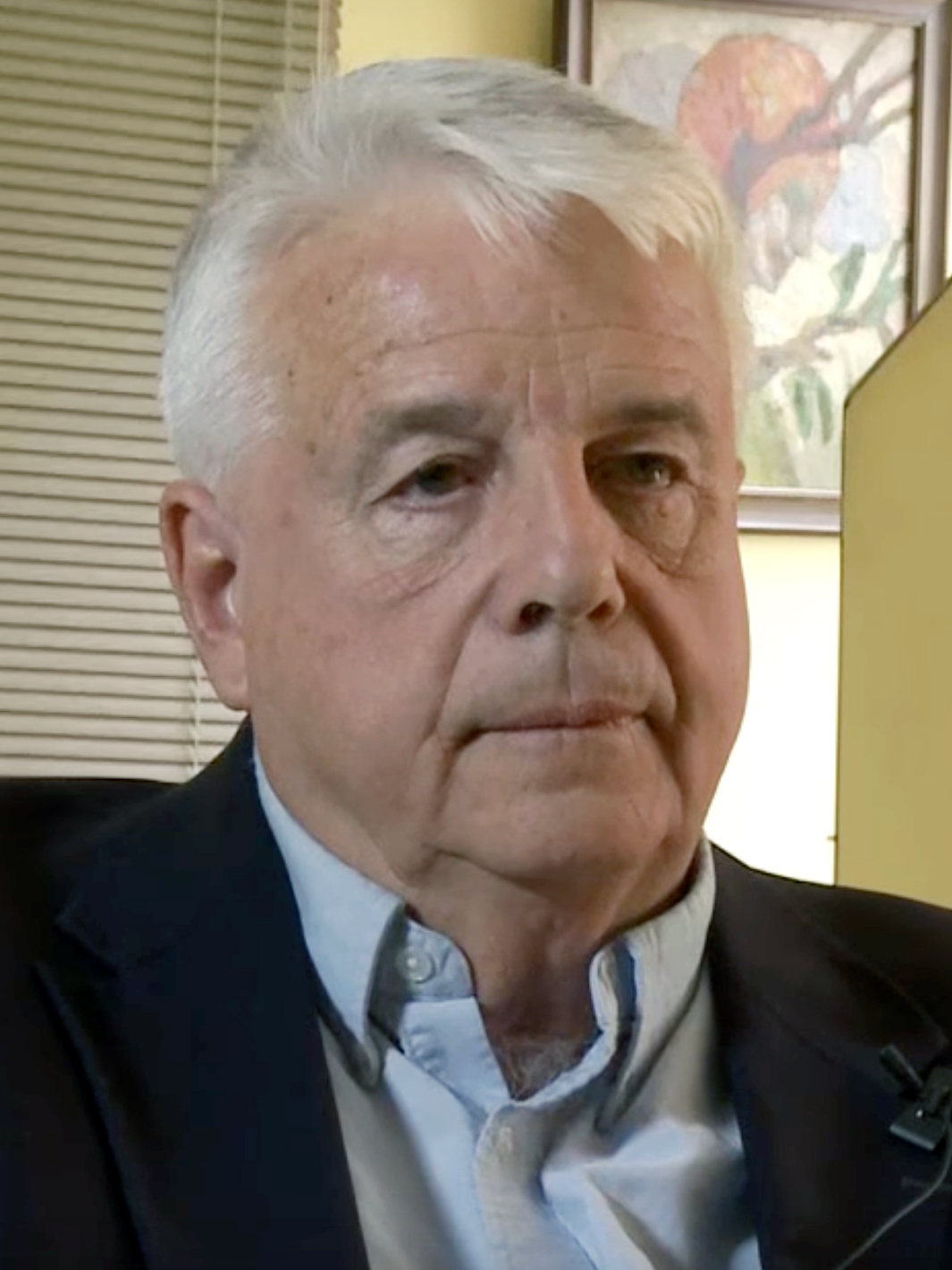
- Tuttle in 2014

16th City Controller of Los Angeles
- In office July 1, 1985 – July 1, 2001
- Preceded by: James Hahn
- Succeeded by: Laura Chick

Personal details
- Born: January 5, 1940 (age 86) New Haven, Connecticut, U.S.
- Party: Democratic
- Spouse: Muff Singer (m. 1976; died 2005) Rebecca Rona (m. 2008)
- Children: Sarah Tuttle-Singer
- Parent(s): Frederick Burton and Mary Emily Tuttle
- Education: Wesleyan University, University of California, Los Angeles

Rick Tuttle (born January 5, 1940) is an American politician, university administrator and educator from Los Angeles, California.

== Early life ==
Rick Tuttle was born in New Haven, Connecticut, one of four children of Frederick Burton Tuttle and his wife, Mary Emily. His father was a descendant of a longtime New England family that originally settled in New Haven in 1638. His mother's family came from Arkansas. Due to his father's service in the U.S. Marine Corps, the family moved to Arkansas, then back to Connecticut and afterwards to Rhode Island before finally settling in Plattsburgh, New York, where he graduated high school.

In civilian life, Frederick, Tuttle's father, was a high school track coach before becoming a school principal in a predominantly African-American New Haven neighborhood. He was also a member of the NAACP, and his involvement in civic affairs made a strong impression on his son.

== Education ==
Tuttle received a Ph.D. in 1975 and an M.A. in history in 1964 from UCLA, as well as a B.A. in history, with honors and distinction, from Wesleyan University in 1962. He worked his way through college by working on various jobs, including at construction sites and as a farm hand.

While an undergraduate at Wesleyan, Tuttle was a member of the university's Civil Rights Committee. Raised as an Episcopalian and Methodist, he served as president of its Alpha Chi Rho chapter and led a campaign to end what was then the fraternity's official policy of restricting membership to Christians.

== Civil rights era activism ==
While a graduate student at UCLA, Tuttle participated in the Freedom Rides in 1961 and was recruited to join the Student Nonviolent Coordinating Committee (SNCC) in 1963. He went to Greenwood, Mississippi to work on voter registration drives and also briefly spied on white supremacist and Ku Klux Klan meetings.

After being driven out of Mississippi by threats, he joined the Chatham County Crusade for Voters in Savannah, Georgia, where he was arrested, without a proper warrant, for disturbing the peace and jailed for six weeks. Tuttle called Medgar Evers from jail to solicit his assistance a few hours before Evers was killed. He was ultimately released by a local judge after a prominent Savannah physician offered his property as bond in exchange for Tuttle's agreement to leave the county.

== Public service ==
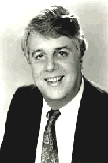
Tuttle's official portrait as Los Angeles City Controller, 2000.

Tuttle was elected to four four-year terms in non-partisan elections as Los Angeles City Controller, serving from 1985 to 2001. In 1985 he was the only candidate running and won 100% of the vote, in 1989 he won with 79.3%, in 1993 with 77.41%, and in 1997 with 70.97%.

By the end of his first term he had earned a reputation for fiscal responsibility.

In a 1989 editorial endorsing his first re-election bid, The Los Angeles Times stated:

Tuttle seems to us the kind of public servant you would like to see in every government office. He gets his basic work done, checking expense accounts, auditing the city's books and meeting its payroll. Then, in his spare time, he quietly finds other ways to make himself useful. He has modernized the city's payroll operation. His office will soon be able to do cost-accounting, an efficiency that could save the city millions of dollars in the future.

And when he retired from public service, a Times columnist wrote:

Like a government paycheck, Tuttle's headlines have always been modest but steady. He embraced the Watergate admonition to 'follow the money,' practicing activism with a pencil and calculator and audit power. He has cracked the City Council's knuckles over its favorite pork. He got mandatory audits written into the new City Charter, crafted civil rights rules forcing downtown private men's clubs to integrate, and refused to pay for lavish dinner tabs, yoga classes and a $2,800 chartered jet flight to Sacramento by a former DWP chief, the last 'the worst [official] extravagance I've ever seen.'

Tuttle is a member of the Democratic Party. His first public position was co-chairman of California Young Citizens for Robert F. Kennedy in 1968. A year later, he founded, along with U.S. Congressmen Howard Berman and Henry Waxman and Los Angeles County Supervisor Zev Yaroslavsky, the Los Angeles County Young Democrats and succeeded Berman and Waxman as statewide president of the California Federation of Young Democrats.

He had briefly considered returning to elected office in 2009 by running for the open Los Angeles City Council District 5 seat to replace the retiring Jack Weiss, but threw his support to Ron Galperin instead.

Tuttle also served as a director of the Los Angeles West Chamber of Commerce and an interviewee of the Fellows Program at Coro of Southern California.

== Academic career ==
A former associate dean of student activities at UCLA, Tuttle served for eight years as an elected member of the Los Angeles Community College Board of Trustees.

After completing the statutory maximum of four terms as city controller, he returned to UCLA as executive director of the Dashew International Center for Student and Scholars, serving in that capacity until 2006. Since then he has taught courses in public policy as a lecturer in the UCLA Luskin School of Public Affairs, and was voted public policy professor of the year three times. In these positions, he has stressed the importance of creating a strong democratic tradition at UCLA, which, in his words, is "the best large public university in a major city."

Tuttle has also been a member of the board of directors of UCLA's University Religious Conference and a board member of the UCLA Alumni Association.

== Awards ==
Tuttle is a recipient of the Equal Justice in Government Award of the NAACP Legal Defense and Education Fund, the Distinguished Public Service Award of the Pacific Southwest Region of the Anti-Defamation League, the Lifetime Membership Award of the Los Angeles Business Council, the UCLA Alumni Public Service Award, and the Distinguished Leadership Award for 1996 presented by the Association of Government Accountants. He received the Los Angeles Employee of the Year Award in 1997 from the All City Employees Benefits Service Association (ACEBSA).

== Personal life ==
Tuttle met his first wife, Muff Singer, while both were working on Robert F. Kennedy's presidential campaign in California. They married in 1976. A Phi Beta Kappa graduate of the University of Texas at Austin and former Peace Corps volunteer in the Philippines, she would later become campaign coordinator and the first administrative assistant of Howard Berman while he was a member of the California State Assembly, prior to his election to the U.S. Congress. She left government service to pursue a career as a successful writer of children's books. Born in Chicago, Illinois, she died of ovarian cancer on January 15, 2005 at their Los Angeles home. Rick Tuttle and Muff Singer are the parents of one daughter, Sarah Emily.

In 2008, Tuttle married Rebecca Rona, a professional writer and social, environmental and political activist. She founded the grassroots organization Together, which for a decade promoted human relations and understanding; worked to end fracking and oil extraction in the Inglewood Oil Field, and has been the driving force behind an effort to convince Culver City to form the Culver City Equity and Human Relations Committee. In 2018, she was honored by the Los Angeles County Democratic Party with the Eleanor and Franklin Roosevelt Award as Democrat of the Year for her Assembly District. Currently she serves as communications director of South Los Angeles Health Projects.

In his spare time Tuttle is an avid basketball fan and, by 2002, was the second-oldest full-court basketball player in Los Angeles.

Political offices
Preceded by James Hahn	City Controller of Los Angeles, California; July 1, 1985 – July 1, 2001	Succeeded by Laura N. Chick
