= Sarah Tuttle-Singer =

Israeli-American writer

- שרה טאטל זינגר
- Born: 30 July 1981 (age 45)
- Notable work: Jerusalem Drawn and Quartered: One Woman’s Year in the Heart of the Christian, Muslim, Armenian, and Jewish Quarters of Old Jerusalem

Sarah Tuttle-Singer (Hebrew: שרה טאטל-סינגר; born 30 July 1981) is a United States-born media editor and media personality living in Israel. She blogs at The Times of Israel, Kveller, Scary Mommy, Ladies' Home Journal, and TIME.com.

Tuttle-Singer writes regarding a range of personal topics and about life in Jerusalem.

Sarah Tuttle-Singer has authored two books, Jerusalem Drawn and Quartered: One Woman’s Year in the Heart of the Christian, Muslim, Armenian, and Jewish Quarters of Old Jerusalem and Fairy Lights in Godʻs Backyard: A Jerusalem Love Story .

== Works ==
=== Published essays ===
- Essay "No More Facebook" included in: Norman-Nathan, Avital (31 December 2013). The Good Mother Myth: Redefining Motherhood to Fit Reality. Seal Press. ISBN 978-1580055024.

=== Books ===
- Jerusalem Drawn and Quartered: One Woman’s Year in the Heart of the Christian, Muslim, Armenian, and Jewish Quarters of Old Jerusalem ISBN 978-1510724891
- Fairy Lights in God’s Backyard: A Jerusalem Love Story,

== Reception ==
Jerusalem, Drawn and Quartered was reviewed by Gila Wertheimer in the Jewish Book Council - who describes Sarah as a “rebellious Jewess” to whom self-expression is paramount

In the Times of Israel, critic Ellis Shuman describes Sarah Tuttle-Singer's writing as "lyrical and poetic", and her book as a "highly personal memoire" that is a "love letter to this fascinating city" .

Tablet Mag featured a review of Jerusalem, Drawn and Quartered by Amin Rosen: A Walking Tour of Secret Jerusalem. The reviewer wrote that Tuttle-Singer, in exploring the city from the mundane to the sublime, “knows its mysteries, earthly and divine.”

Fairy Lights in God's Backyard received coverage in The Forward by Rob Eshman, who reviewed the book . Eshman described Sarah's love of Jerusalem and her ability to describe difficult events from an a-political lens, with a loving, humane touch.
