= 2009 Los Angeles City Attorney election =

- May 19, 2009
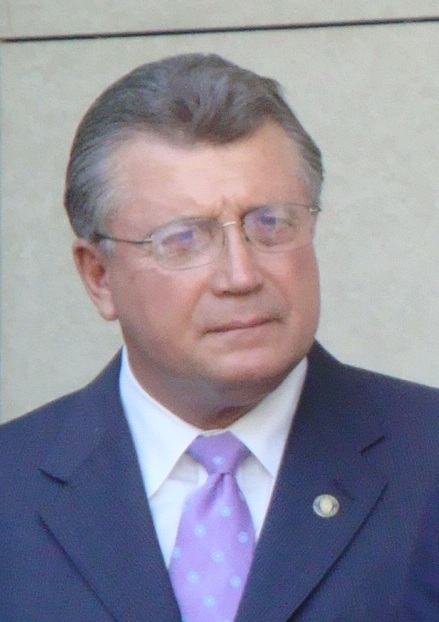

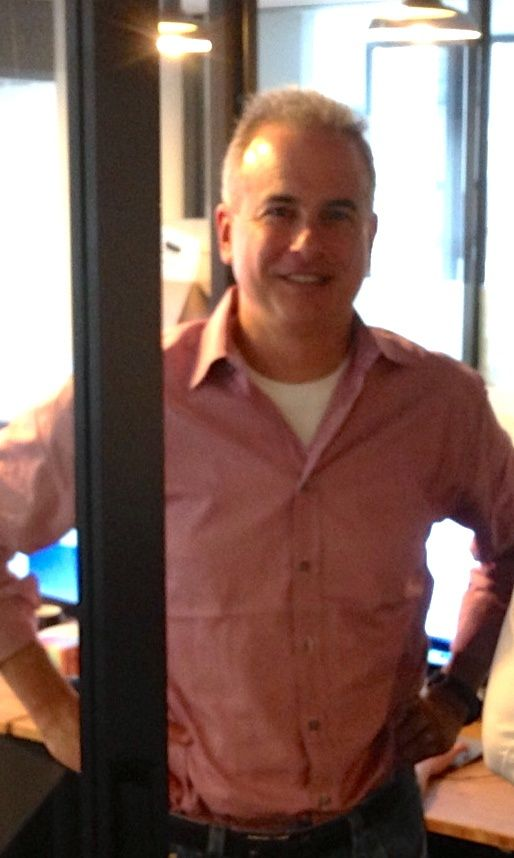
Candidate	Carmen Trutanich	Jack Weiss
Popular vote	131,777	104,622
Percentage	55.7%	44.3%
Los Angeles City Attorney before election
Rocky Delgadillo
Democratic
Elected Los Angeles City Attorney
Carmen Trutanich
Democratic

The 2009 Los Angeles City Attorney election was held on March 3, 2009, to replace then Los Angeles City Attorney Rocky Delgadillo, who was unable to run since he had reached his term limit. Leading up to March 3 election, the declared candidates were Michael Richard American, David Berger, Carmen Trutanich, Los Angeles City Council member Jack Weiss, and Noel Weiss.

Since no candidate received a 50% majority of votes, a run-off election was held on 19 May between the top two, Weiss and Trutanich. Trutanich won the run-off election with 55.7% of the votes to become the Los Angeles city attorney.

== March 3 election result ==
- Jack Weiss: 36.47%
- Carmen Trutanich: 26.93%
- Michael Richard American: 17.28%
- David Berger: 14.21%
- Noel Weiss: 5.11%

== 19 May election run-off result ==
- Carmen Trutanich: 131,777 votes, 55.7%
- Jack Weiss: 104,622 votes, 44.3%
