= Trutanich =

Trutanich is a surname. Notable people with the surname include:

- Carmen Trutanich (born 1951), American politician
- Nicholas A. Trutanich, American attorney
