= California's 42nd district =

California's 42nd district may refer to:

- California's 42nd congressional district
- California's 42nd State Assembly district
