= Chad Mayes =

American politician (born 1977)

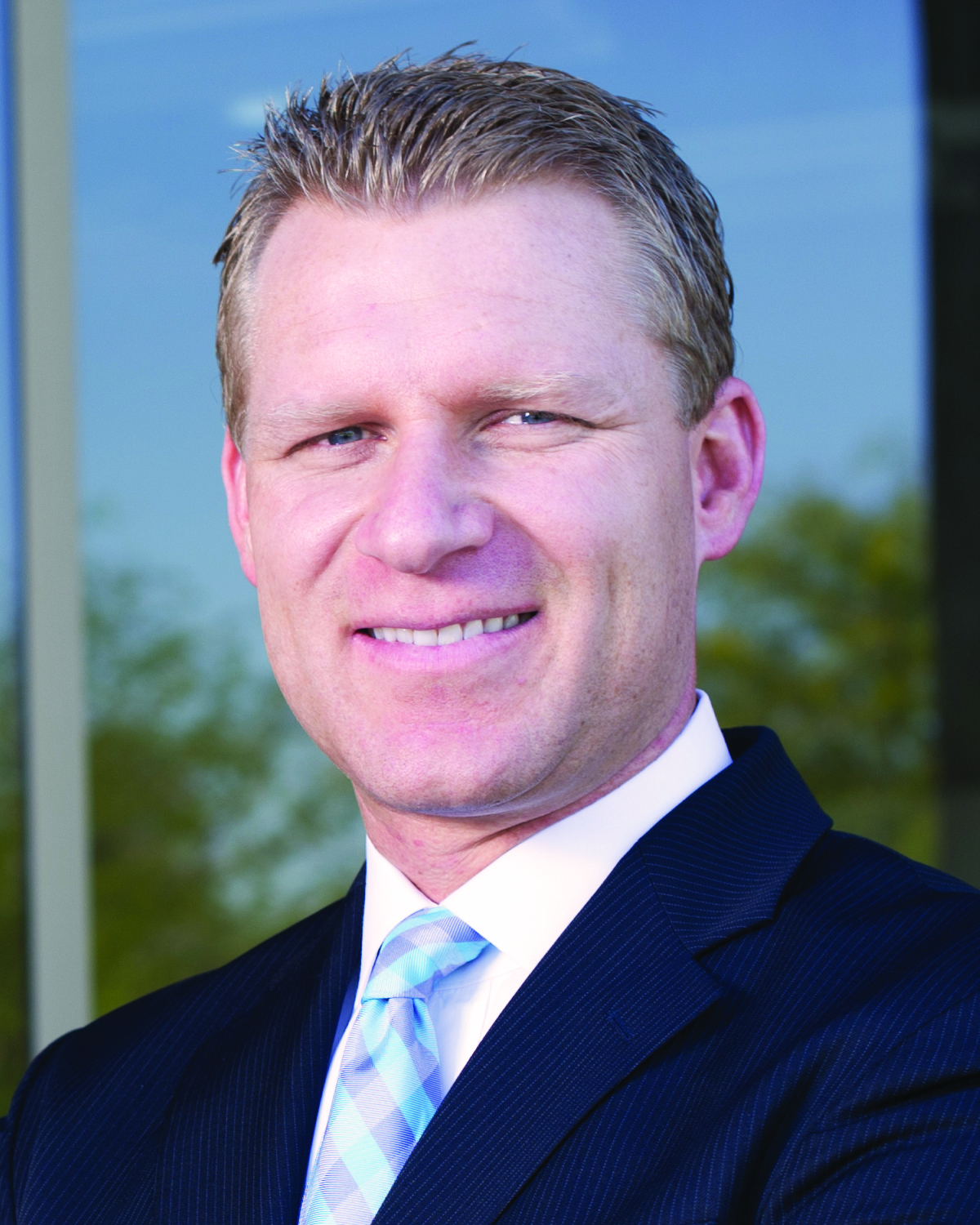
- Official portrait, 2014

Minority Leader of the California Assembly
- In office January 4, 2016 – September 15, 2017
- Preceded by: Kristin Olsen
- Succeeded by: Brian Dahle

Member of the California State Assembly from the 42nd district
- In office December 1, 2014 – December 5, 2022
- Preceded by: Brian Nestande
- Succeeded by: Jacqui Irwin

Personal details
- Born: Chad Jeffrey Mayes; April 23, 1977 (age 49) Lebanon, Pennsylvania, U.S.
- Party: Republican (before 2019); Independent (2019–present)
- Education: Liberty University (BA)

Chad Jeffrey Mayes (born April 23, 1977) is an American politician who served in the California State Assembly. He was an independent representing the 42nd district, encompassing parts of Riverside and San Bernardino counties. Prior to being elected to the State Assembly, he was a Yucca Valley Town Councilmember.

== Early life and education ==
The son of a pastor, Mayes grew up in Yucca Valley, graduating from Grace Christian School at 16. He went on to take courses at Copper Mountain College before graduating from Liberty University. While attending Liberty he interned for John Ashcroft in Washington, D.C.

Mayes earned a Bachelor of Science in Government from Liberty University. Mayes became a businessman at 23, working as a stockbroker at the Edward Jones office he opened.

== Yucca Valley Town Council ==
Mayes served on the Yucca Valley Town Council from 2002–2011, and was twice elected by the council to serve as mayor.

In 2004, Mayes and then-councilmember Paul Cook voted against a proposed 42-percent pay increase for town elected officials. In his final budget as Mayor, Yucca Valley spent $8.7 million, a slight decrease from the previous year, and had over $5 million in reserves.

In 2011, Mayes resigned as a member of the town council to focus on his responsibilities as chief of staff to San Bernardino County Supervisor Janice Rutherford, saying he found it "difficult to keep up with the basics of serving as a council member," and that "Yucca Valley deserves a council member who will give them 100 percent every day."

== California State Assembly ==
=== First term ===
In 2014, Mayes ran for the California State Assembly to succeed term-limited Republican Brian Nestande, who ran unsuccessfully for Congress that year. Mayes defeated former Palm Springs Police Chief Gary Jeandron in the primary and was elected to the State Assembly in November 2014, with 57.3% of the vote. He was appointed Vice Chair of the Assembly Human Services Committee and a member of the Committees on Governmental Organization, Insurance and Rules, as well as the Special Committee on Legislative Ethics. Mayes was also appointed to the Select Committee on Renewable Energy Development and Restoration of the Salton Sea, and was named Chief Republican Whip.

He was appointed to the Little Hoover Commission by former Speaker of the Assembly Toni Atkins in September 2015 and reappointed by Assembly Speaker Anthony Rendon in January 2018. Mayes was also appointed by Toni Atkins to serve on the California Commission on Disability Access, which works to improve accessibility by fostering dialogue between the disabled and business communities.

During his first year in office, he introduced AB 851, which provides an orderly process for municipal disincorporation, AB 1286, which would create a body to holistically examine the state's regulatory environment, and AB 1202, which would have reduced the California State Fire Prevention Fee for residents who also pay for fire prevention at the local level. All three bills received unanimous bi-partisan support in their policy committee hearings.

=== Assembly Republican Leader ===
Mayes was selected by his colleagues to serve as Assembly Republican Leader on September 1, 2015 succeeding Assemblywoman Kristin Olsen. Mayes became Assembly Republican Leader effective January 4, 2016. Mayes was the Member who challenged the notion of poverty in California by stating that "California has the highest poverty rate in the nation." The fact checking website Politifact.com labeled Mayes statement as "True". To promote his assertion, Mayes placed professionally produced advertisements that were delivered digitally throughout California.

As one of his first actions as Leader, Mayes took the entire Assembly Republican Caucus to visit St. John's Program for Real Change to meet with mothers who have emerged from abuse, poverty and homelessness. Later, Mayes negotiated with Governor Brown and legislative Democrats to craft a health plan tax package designed to draw down in more than a billion dollars in matching federal money. In exchange for Republican support, Mayes secured language to provide more money to help people with autism and other developmental disabilities and forgiving a budget debt owed by skilled-nursing facilities.

In May 2017, the California Family Council criticized Mayes for posting a tweet that endorsed Harvey Milk Day. In July 2017, Mayes led a handful of Republicans in the State Assembly to vote with the Democratic majority in favor of AB 398, which extended the state's climate change program – colloquially referred to as "cap and trade" – for an additional 13 years. Mayes, along with six other Assembly Republicans and one Republican in the State Senate, voted for the bill alongside almost all of the Democrats in both chambers, and Governor Jerry Brown signed the bill into law. The effort was viewed by conservative activists as a vote in favor of more government regulations and increased taxes, and after multiple county parties officially called on Mayes to step down as Assembly Minority Leader, the state board of the California Republican Party did the same. On August 24, the Republican caucus announced the removal of Mayes as the Minority Leader, and he was succeeded by Brian Dahle on September 15.

=== Wildfire catastrophe fund ===
Following a series of devastating wildfires caused by electric utility equipment, including the 2018 Camp Fire, Mayes was among the first to call for the creation of a wildfire catastrophe fund. Under California's unusual inverse condemnation liability standard, utility Pacific Gas & Electric was expected to be liable for $30 billion in damages resulting from fires caused by its equipment; this led the utility to file for bankruptcy, calling into question whether the utility would be able to pay claims. Recognizing the need to protect both fire victims and utility ratepayers, Mayes’s plan would create a fund to pay claims to victims following a catastrophic event. In 2019, Mayes authored AB 235, the first legislation introduced to create a wildfire catastrophe fund, and also authored AB 1054, which created a $21 billion fund to pay claims following a major wildfire.

=== Independent ===
On December 6, 2019, Mayes left the Republican party and filed for re-election as an independent.

== New Way California ==
In January 2018, Mayes formed "New Way California," aiming to broaden the appeal of the Republican Party by advocating for "individual freedom, shared responsibility, educational excellence, environmental stewardship, efficient government and an open economy." The group has been publicly supported by former governor Arnold Schwarzenegger, and both Mayes and Schwarzenegger – along with Ohio governor John Kasich – headlined the group's inaugural summit in Los Angeles on March 21. The summit featured several other Republicans from the State Assembly, including Rocky Chávez, Devon Mathis, and Jordan Cunningham. The summit was criticized by some in the California Republican Party, including former chairman Ron Nehring, who described them as “elites talking down to grassroots voters.”

== Election results ==
=== 2014 ===
California's 42nd State Assembly district election, 2014
Primary election
Party	Candidate	Votes	%
Democratic	Karalee Hargrove	22,973	37.8
Republican	Chad Mayes	20,921	34.4
Republican	Gary Jeandron	14,877	27.8
Total votes		60,771	100.0
General election
Republican	Chad Mayes	56,517	57.3
Democratic	Karalee Hargrove	42,082	42.7
Total votes		98,599	100.0

=== 2016 ===
California's 42nd State Assembly district election, 2016
Primary election
Party	Candidate	Votes	%
Republican	Chad Mayes (incumbent)	49,580	50.8
Democratic	Greg Rodriguez	40,446	41.4
Libertarian	Jeff Hewitt	7,601	7.8
Total votes		97,627	100.0
General election
Republican	Chad Mayes (incumbent)	97,864	57.4
Democratic	Greg Rodriguez	72,581	42.6
Total votes		170,445	100.0
Republican hold			

=== 2018 ===
California's 42nd State Assembly district election, 2018
Primary election
Party	Candidate	Votes	%
Democratic	DeniAntionette Mazingo	33,586	35.6
Republican	Chad Mayes (incumbent)	30,880	32.8
Republican	Gary Jeandron	15,032	16.0
Republican	Andrew F. Kotyuk	11,572	12.3
Green	Carol Bouldin	3,166	3.4
Total votes		94,236	100.0
General election
Republican	Chad Mayes (incumbent)	86,333	55.3
Democratic	DeniAntionette Mazingo	69,747	44.7
Total votes		156,080	100.0
Republican hold			

=== 2020 ===
California State Assembly election, 2020
Primary election
Party	Candidate	Votes	%
No party preference	Chad Mayes (incumbent)	42,717	35.0
Republican	Andrew F. Kotyuk	40,893	33.5
Democratic	DeniAntionette Mazingo	38,492	31.5
Total votes		122,102	100.0
General election
No party preference	Chad Mayes (incumbent)	120,359	55.6
Republican	Andrew F. Kotyuk	96,172	44.4
Total votes		216,531	100.0

California Assembly
Preceded by Kristin Olsen	Minority Leader of the California State Assembly; 2016–2017	Succeeded by Brian Dahle
