= Mike Feuer =

American politician and lawyer

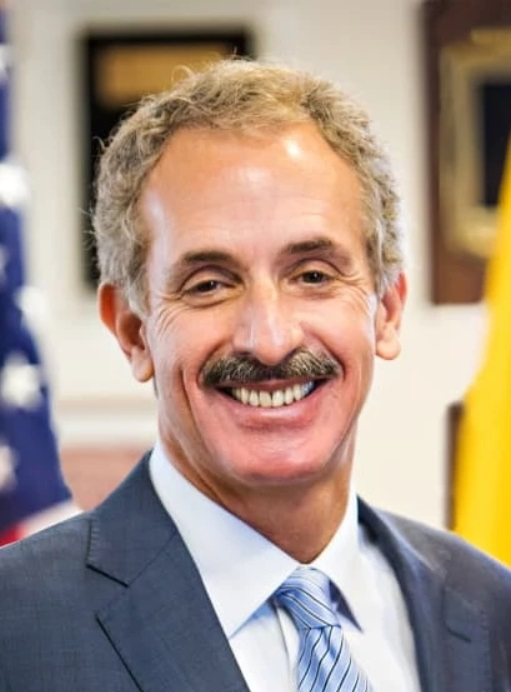
- Official portrait, 2022

42nd City Attorney of Los Angeles
- In office July 1, 2013 – December 11, 2022
- Mayor: Eric Garcetti
- Preceded by: Carmen Trutanich
- Succeeded by: Hydee Feldstein Soto

Member of the California State Assembly from the 42nd district
- In office December 4, 2006 – November 30, 2012
- Preceded by: Paul Koretz
- Succeeded by: Brian Nestande

Member of the Los Angeles City Council from the 5th district
- In office July 1, 1994 – July 1, 2001
- Preceded by: Zev Yaroslavsky
- Succeeded by: Jack Weiss

Personal details
- Born: May 14, 1958 (age 68) San Bernardino, California, U.S.
- Party: Democratic
- Spouse: Gail Ruderman
- Children: 2
- Education: Claremont McKenna College Harvard University (BA, JD)

Michael Nelson Feuer (born May 14, 1958) is an American politician and lawyer who served as Los Angeles City Attorney from 2013 to 2022. A member of the Democratic Party, Feuer previously served three terms in the California State Assembly, representing the 42nd Assembly District, and as a member of the Los Angeles City Council from 1995 to 2001, representing the 5th Council District.

Prior to seeking office, Feuer served as executive director of Bet Tzedek Legal Services and was a lawyer in private practice. He was a candidate in the 2022 Los Angeles mayoral election, until he dropped out on May 17, 2022.

== Early life, education, and career ==
Feuer was born and raised in San Bernardino, in a Jewish family in San Bernardino, California. He graduated in 1976 from San Bernardino High School, where he was president and a valedictorian of his class. Feuer received both a bachelor's degree (magna cum laude, Phi Beta Kappa) and a J.D. degree (cum laude) from Harvard University. He later served on the Harvard Law School Visiting Committee, which reports to the Harvard Board of Overseers. He served as a judicial clerk to Justice Joseph Grodin of the California Supreme Court, and practiced law at two California law firms.

After briefly practicing law in the 1980s, Feuer worked as issues and research director for the second gubernatorial campaign of Tom Bradley, the first African-American Mayor of Los Angeles. Feuer was then selected to serve as executive director of Bet Tzedek Legal Services, an organization which "provides legal services to the needy of all faiths". He oversaw programs to help Alzheimer's patients, victims of the Northridge earthquake and L.A. civil unrest, and Holocaust survivors striving to obtain restitution. He also taught at the UCLA School of Law. Feuer was described by the Los Angeles Daily Journal as having transformed Bet Tzedek into a "national success story".

== Los Angeles City Council (1994–2001) ==
From 1995 to 2001, Feuer served as the 5th District member of the Los Angeles City Council. He was elected to fill a vacancy caused by the election of Councilmember Zev Yaroslavsky to the Los Angeles County Board of Supervisors. Feuer defeated Barbara Yaroslavsky, the outgoing councilmember's wife. Feuer's City Council candidacy was endorsed by the Los Angeles Times, and supported by "a 'Who's Who' of Jewish community activists", as well as former Justice Joseph Grodin, who noted that Feuer "had a degree of self-confidence that made him unusual", though some criticized Feuer for this. Feuer won the seat by a two-to-one margin.

On the City Council, Feuer chaired the Budget and Finance Committee, and wrote key City ethics reform measures. He championed the creation of L.A.'s 3-1-1 non-emergency services system, wrote a number of gun violence prevention laws, and was noted for advocating public safety, environmental stewardship and open government. Feuer also created a program to improve literacy for underserved students, and led Council efforts to create playgrounds for children with disabilities.

Feuer was the only council member to oppose a ballot measure to lift a $10,000 spending limit on "officeholder" funds, which Council Member Nate Holden criticized as "grandstanding." Mark Ridley-Thomas also criticized Feuer, saying "Mister Feuer seems to suggest that there is a higher ground that [he has] staked out that the balance of the council does not seem to appreciate." Some colleagues also blamed Feuer for the City Council's contentious relationship with Mayor Richard Riordan. Feuer defended himself saying he was trying to make good on campaign promises for government and ethics reforms.

In 2001, Feuer ran for City Attorney. He placed first in the nonpartisan primary for the office, taking 39% to opponent Rocky Delgadillo's 38%, but was defeated in the runoff, with Delgadillo taking 52% to Feuer's 48%, though Feuer received the endorsement of the Los Angeles Times, which noted his "record as an honest broker".

Afterward, Feuer worked in private practice and taught at the UCLA School of Public Affairs. During this time, he provided commentary for newspapers and public radio.

== California State Assembly (2006–2012) ==
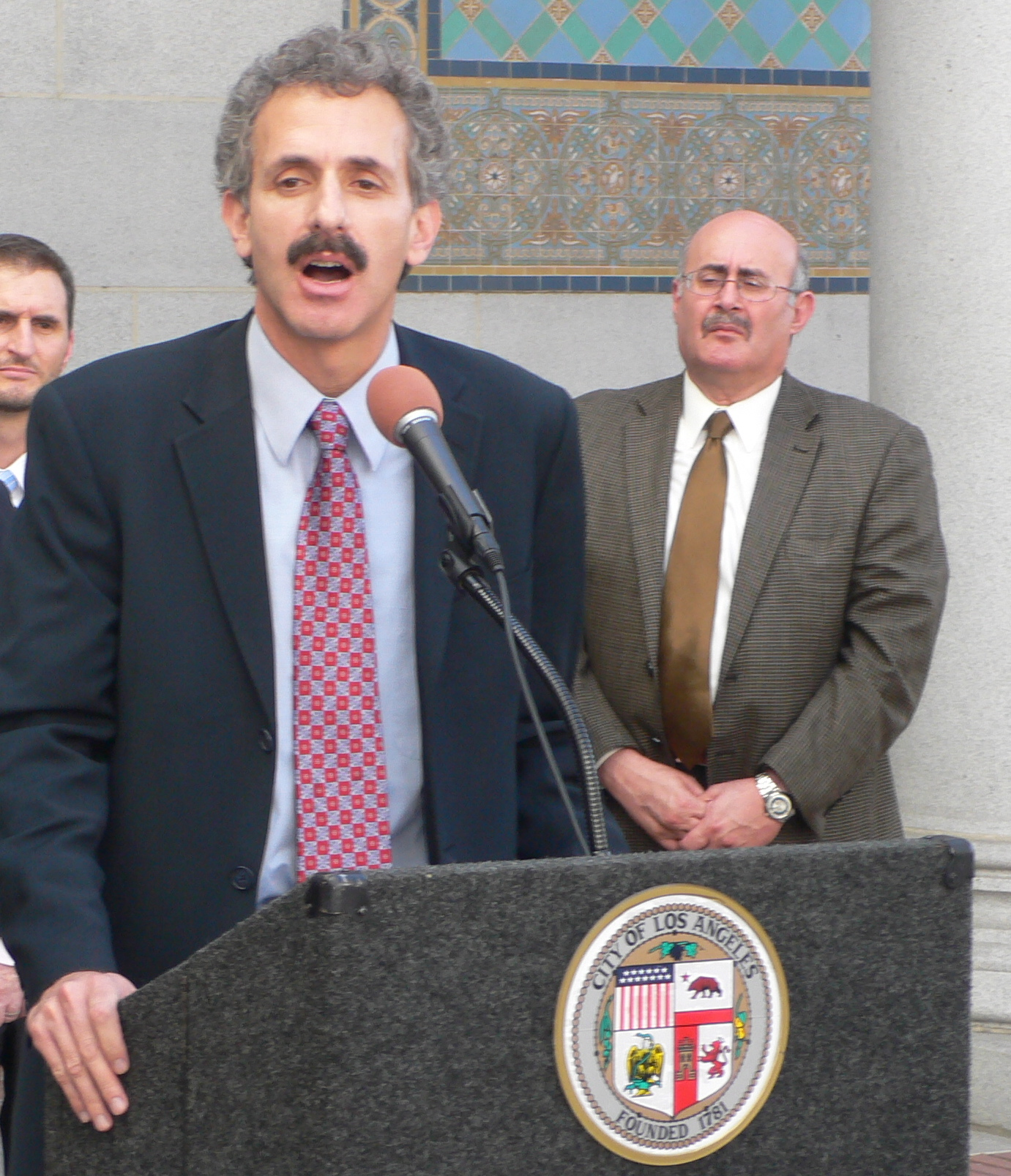
Feuer in 2009.

In 2006, Feuer defeated West Hollywood Mayor Abbe Land and three others in the Democratic primary for the 42nd Assembly District seat. Feuer served as a member of the California State Assembly, 42nd District, from December 4, 2006, to November 30, 2012. He served as the Majority Policy Leader of the California Assembly and Chair of the Assembly's Judiciary Committee.

During his time with the State Assembly, he authored numerous bills. He wrote laws that prevent insurers from denying coverage to children with pre-existing health conditions. He also wrote a law that requires nursing homes to post the quality care rating that has been given to them by the Centers for Medicare and Medicaid Services. He supported funding the Long Term care Ombudsman program which responds to reports of suspected abuse and neglect. He authored the Reverse Mortgage Elder Protection Act that mandates more information when considering reverse mortgages, including risks and alternatives to using them. He wrote a law that protects Good Samaritans from liability. In 2010, he authored legislation requiring people convicted of DUI to install ignition interlock devices (IID's) in their cars. He wrote the Sargent Shriver Civil Counsel Act, a pilot program to assure equal justice by providing free legal representation to low-income Californians. It was signed into law as a permanent program in 2016. He supported equal treatment for same-sex couples. He co-authored a law that prohibits contracts of $1 million or more between the State of California (including cities and counties) and companies with significant business in Iran's energy sector to ensure that tax dollars do not go to companies whose investments support Iran's nuclear program. In 2009, Feuer wrote a law to conserve water usage, and another law that facilitates domestic partners having the same rights with respect to survivorship benefits as spouses.

Feuer also wrote the law authorizing Los Angeles's $35 billion measure to enhance public transit to go to the ballot. In the face of voter suppression efforts nationally, Feuer wrote California's law allowing same-day voter registration. Confronting the foreclosure crisis, Feuer was a joint author of the Homeowners' Bill of Rights. He also wrote legislation to remove cancer-causing agents from consumer products.

== Los Angeles City Attorney (2013–2022) ==
Feuer took office as the Los Angeles City Attorney on July 1, 2013. He was re-elected in 2017 without opposition.

Feuer expanded the Neighborhood Prosecutor Program. He has emphasized protecting consumers, preventing gun violence, reforming the criminal justice system and making neighborhoods safer. He has stepped in to prevent developers from receiving special treatment, and to fight corruption in land use development.

In March 2019, Feuer "launched an ethics review to look at issues surrounding the 2017 settlement of a class-action lawsuit" brought by customers of the Los Angeles Department of Water and Power (DWP) against the city. Feuer's office hired legal ethics expert Ellen Pansky to evaluate the integrity of all lawyers involved, including outside counsel and staff, working on the DWP cases. Feuer said of the controversy, "[t]he chips will fall where they fall, and I will take decisive action if this review reveals any breach of ethics". In July 2019, FBI agents raided the offices of the LA City Attorney and of the DWP with respect to the matter. There were reports that outside defense counsel hired by the city had recruited a plaintiff to sue the city over the DWP billing errors. Pansky compiled a 172-page report ultimately finding no credible evidence of wrongdoing on the part of City Attorney staff, though Feuer determined to "make significant changes to the way his office hires outside lawyers to remove even the appearance of a conflict of interest".

Feuer challenged a number of efforts by the Trump Administration, particularly in the area of immigration. Additionally, in 2020, Feuer joined with other jurisdictions and non-profit organizations to sue the Administration over its effort to curtail the U.S. Census.

== Record ==
=== Consumer protection ===
In a 2017 case having national implications, Feuer sued Wells Fargo for opening unauthorized accounts, winning a substantial settlement including protections for consumers, in conjunction with federal regulators. He has also sued the Weather Channel App over data privacy concerns, vape companies alleging that they target children and H&R Block and Intuit, the makers of Turbo Tax, alleging the companies defrauded low-income taxpayers and charged them for a service that the companies are required by law to provide for free. Feuer filed a wage theft suit in 2014 to protect low income workers, and sued to remove lead from pre-natal vitamins.

=== Environmental protection ===
Feuer sued Southern California Gas Company (SoCalGas) over the massive Aliso Canyon gas leak. The suit was later joined by the Attorney General of California, Kamala Harris, and by Los Angeles County. In 2018 SoCalGas settled, agreeing to payments of $119.5 million to several government entities over the incident, much of which was devoted to long-term public health projects. Feuer also sued oil company AllenCo Energy for public nuisance after numerous complaints from low-income neighbors over health issues. The case ultimately settled with the company prohibited from operating absent stringent new health and safety requirements.

In 2014, Feuer charged two businesses for polluting as a part of an effort to clean up neighborhoods near schools. He also formed a strike force to combat illegal dumping, Feuer settled a dispute regarding the City of LA's responsibility for dust pollution in the Owens Valley.

=== Gun violence prevention ===
To prevent gun violence, Feuer created the Gun Violence Prevention Unit in his office. Feuer has brought charges against parents who did not properly store firearms which later fell into the hands of their children. Working with the LAPD, he created protocols to assure domestic violence perpetrators do not have weapons. He has also advocated for the use of gun violence restraining orders, leading educational trainings after the law passed in California in 2016. Feuer joined with Manhattan District Attorney Cyrus Vance, Jr. to co-found and chair Prosecutors Against Gun Violence—an independent, non-partisan coalition devoted to prosecutorial and policy solutions to the public health and safety crisis of gun violence. After the Parkland shooting, he formed a Blue Ribbon Panel on School Safety to evaluate and recommend ways to enhance efforts by Los Angeles Unified School District to keep students safe from violence, particularly gun violence, both in schools and surrounding neighborhoods.

In 2019, a federal judge blocked the City of Los Angeles and Feuer from enforcing a law that would require contractors seeking to do business with the city to disclose ties to the National Rifle Association of America. Feuer had vigorously defended the law.

=== Immigration ===
Feuer has challenged a range of Trump Administration policies on immigration. He confronted federal officials at LAX in an attempt to secure the release of detainees held because of Executive Order 13769, more widely known as the Trump Administration's Muslim Travel Ban. In April 2018, Feuer successfully petitioned for an injunction against the Federal Government stopping the Trump Administration from tying funding to immigration considerations. Feuer's office led other cities and counties to oppose the Administration's efforts to end the Deferred Action for Child Arrivals (DACA) program.

In addition, in 2015, he instituted a program to protect immigrants from fraud.

=== Criminal justice reform ===
Feuer put in place criminal justice reforms including a street-based approach to address drug use, mental health and treatment, and a neighborhood-based restorative justice program that recruits volunteers to help reduce repeat offenses.

=== Homeless issues ===
Feuer's office has worked to combat the unlawful discharge of homeless patients, reaching $4 million in settlements with hospitals, nursing facilities and medical centers in eight such cases. His office established programs to eliminate fines and warrants that could impede a homeless person from receiving shelter or a job, and a program that sends teams including a nurse, mental health expert and substance abuse expert to encampments to intervene with at-risk people experiencing homelessness.

In 2019, Feuer filed an amicus brief asking the U.S. Supreme Court to grant review for Martin v. Boise, a case from the Ninth Circuit Court of Appeal. The Martin decision held that the "enforcement of ordinances that prohibit sleeping or camping on public property against homeless individuals is unconstitutional when those individuals do not have a meaningful alternative, such as shelter space or a legal place to camp." Feuer sought a clarification of this ruling, but the Supreme Court denied the request for review.

=== COVID-19 response ===
In response to the COVID-19 pandemic, which had a substantial impact in California, Feuer's office targeted price gouging for essential supplies, false advertising claims about fake test kits, preventions and cures, and potential superspreading events at party houses. Feuer also launched a campaign to help victims of domestic violence trapped with their abusers. enforced the Los Angeles Mayor's Safer at Home Order, and worked to prevent anti-Asian hate incidents fueled by references to the "Chinese flu".

=== Protestors at public meetings ===
In the wake of national protests following the murder of George Floyd, Feuer announced he would not prosecute peaceful protesters. Instead, Feuer offered protesters the chance to participate in a series of conversations with police and others to promote reconciliation. Having previously been a recipient of substantial donations from the Los Angeles Police Protective League, the union of the Los Angeles Police Department, Feuer insisted that this would not represent a conflict of interest. Feuer said he would prosecute those who engaged in looting, vandalism or acts of violence.

Feuer's office had previously filed charges against protesters, including prominent Black activists, after their arrests during Los Angeles Police Commission meetings. These include Los Angeles' only homeless elected official "General" Jeff Page, Black Lives Matter Los Angeles co-founder and Cal State LA professor Melina Abdullah, and longtime civil and human rights activist and labor organizer Greg Akili. Akili, a member of Black Lives Matter Los Angeles' Action Committee and a cofounder of the United Domestic Workers Union, filed a $4 million lawsuit in 2017 against the City of Los Angeles, the LAPD, and others regarding his arrest at a 2016 Commission meeting and subsequent prosecution. After his conviction for resisting arrest, Akili said Feuer could have avoided the "political trial" by dropping the charges against him.

=== Transparency in government ===
Feuer's office waged a successful fight for transparency in how ratepayer dollars are spent by DWP trusts. He also successfully advocated for City Council to revoke consideration of a taxpayer subsidy to a real estate developer whom the city had previously sued for unpaid taxes.

=== Animal protection ===
Feuer's office has prosecuted cases of animal hoarding, endangerment and abuse, and practicing veterinary medicine without a license.

He has conducted public awareness campaigns to warn the public not to leave their pets alone in their cars, and to be aware of puppy scams online.

=== Cannabis ===
Feuer has supported access to medical marijuana, with some limitations. In 2013, Los Angeles voters passed Proposition D, restricting the locations where medical marijuana could be sold. Thereafter, in 2014, Feuer announced that he was targeting medical marijuana dispensaries and a medical marijuana home-delivery service Nestdrop run by smartphone app. Feuer believed there was a voter mandate from Proposition D, saying that the voters "felt there were too many dispensaries — and there are too many, too close together and too close to sensitive sites like schools, playgrounds and child care centers". Feuer closed half of the city's marijuana dispensaries and filed a complaint against Nestdrop seeking to prevent them from providing home-delivery of medical marijuana.

Some criticized Feuer for his actions, with Americans for Safe Access spokesman Kris Hermes saying that Feuer "should be figuring out ways to improve access instead of figuring out how to shut down dispensaries", and asserting that delivery services "developed because of local officials who are trying to shut down dispensaries" and "are a way that people with mobility problems can get their medicine".

== 2022 Los Angeles mayoral election ==
On March 9, 2020, Feuer announced his candidacy for Mayor of Los Angeles. On May 12, 2021, Mike Feuer for LA Mayor put out a video entitled "Best Friend" featuring Jason Alexander as Feuer's mustache. The Los Angeles Times found that of the major candidates for mayor in the 2022 Los Angeles mayoral election, Feuer was the only one with a detailed plan for climate change and sustainability. Shortly after the LA Times published this finding, Karen Bass and Kevin de León released their plans as well.

== 2024 congressional election ==
Feuer announced in February 2023 that he was running for California's 30th congressional district. The incumbent representative, Adam Schiff, was a candidate in 2024 United States Senate election in California and was consequently not running for reelection. He lost the primary to Laura Friedman and Alex Balekian, placing fourth behind California State Senator Anthony Portantino.

== Awards ==
The American Bar Association Government and Public Sector Lawyers Division awarded the Los Angeles City Attorney's Office with the Hodson Award (2017), which recognizes sustained outstanding performance or specific and extraordinary service by a government or public sector law office.

Other awards and recognitions received by Feuer include:

- FAMMY Award, Jewish Family Services of Los Angeles
- Courageous Leadership Award, Women Against Gun Violence
- Education Advocacy Award, American Civil Liberties Union
- 2009, Consumer Attorneys of California Legislator of the Year
- 2009, American Planning Association, Los Angeles Section, Distinguished Leadership Award for an Elected Official
- 2010, Byron Sher Award for Achievement in Environmental Protection by a Public Official
- 2010, Stanley Mosk Defender of Justice Award
- 2015, Courageous Leadership Award, co-awarded to New York County District Attorney Cyrus Vance Jr. "for their work founding Prosecutors Against Gun Violence"
- 2017, Prosecutor of the Year
- 2018, Prosecutor of the Year, 12th-annual Fidler Awards

== Personal life ==
Feuer has been married to California Court of Appeal Justice Gail Ruderman Feuer for over 36 years. They have two children.

Political offices
Preceded by Zev Yaroslavsky	Los Angeles City Councilmember, 5th district July 1, 1994 – July 1, 2001	Succeeded by Jack Weiss
California Assembly
Preceded by Paul Koretz	California State Assemblymember, 42nd district December 4, 2006 – November 30, 2012	Succeeded by Brian Nestande
Legal offices
Preceded by Carmen Trutanich	Los Angeles City Attorney; July 1, 2013–December 11, 2022	Succeeded by Hydee Feldstein Soto
