= Jack Weiss =

American politician

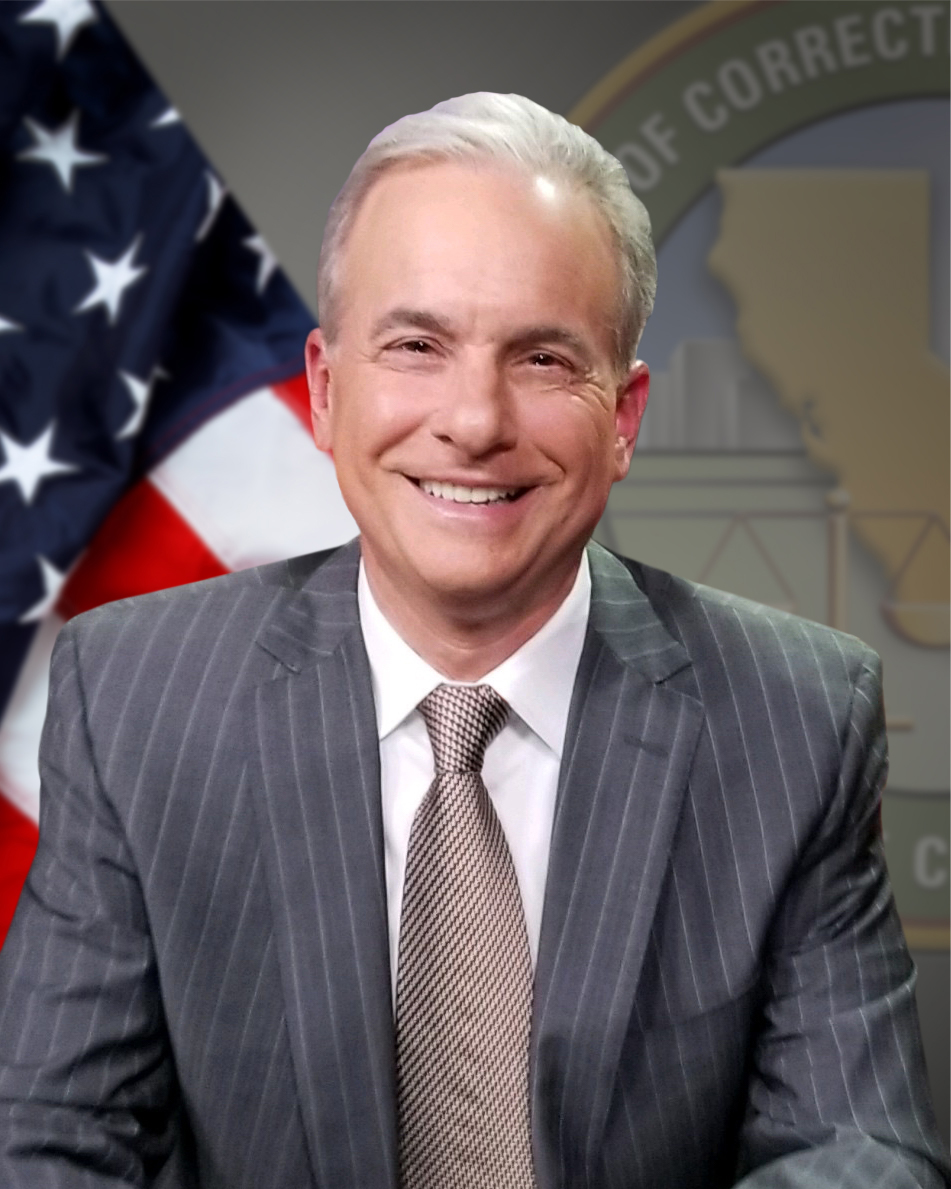
- Official portrait, 2022

Commissioner for the California Department of Corrections
- Incumbent
- Assumed office August 19, 2022
- Appointed by: Gavin Newsom

Member of the Los Angeles City Council from the 5th district
- In office July 1, 2001 – July 1, 2009
- Preceded by: Michael Feuer
- Succeeded by: Paul Koretz

Personal details
- Born: Jack Stephen Weiss; August 21, 1964 (age 62) Los Angeles, California, U.S.
- Party: Democratic
- Spouse: Leslie Barnes Kautz
- Education: Princeton University (AB); University of California, Los Angeles (JD)

Jack Stephen Weiss (born August 21, 1964) is an American entrepreneur and former politician. He is co-founder of BlueLine Grid alongside William Bratton and David Riker and is a former member of the Los Angeles City Council representing the 5th district from 2001 to 2009. He previously served as an Assistant United States Attorney for the Central District of California from 1994 to 2000. He is a member of the Democratic Party.

== Background and early career ==
Weiss graduated from Beverly Hills High School in 1982, and then graduated with honors from the Woodrow Wilson School of Public and International Affairs at Princeton University in 1986. After graduation, Weiss moved to Washington, D.C. where he worked as an arms control researcher and as a legislative assistant on Capitol Hill. He then attended UCLA School of Law and graduated in 1992. While at UCLA, Weiss was the editor-in-chief of the UCLA Law Review. After graduating from UCLA, Weiss served as a law clerk to a federal judge in California. Weiss then briefly practiced as an attorney with the Los Angeles law firm of Irell & Manella LLP.

== Business career ==
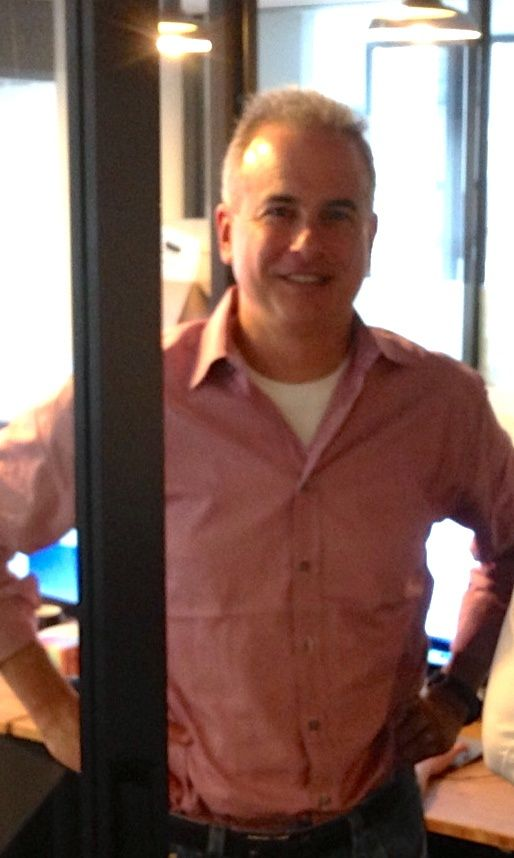
Weiss in 2013.

Weiss is a co-founder of BlueLine Grid, a New York-based start-up that provides mobile communications tools to public sector employees and agencies. The Company was originally known as Bratton Technologies, Inc., which Weiss co-founded in January 2013 with Bill Bratton and David Riker, a company with the mission of connecting all public safety agencies in the United States. BlueLine Grid launched a mobile communications application for public employees in May 2014.

In 2009, Weiss joined Virginia-based security and global investigations firm Altegrity Risk International. In August 2010, Altegrity acquired Kroll, a global risk consulting company, and in September 2010, Weiss was chosen to head Kroll's Los Angeles office. Weiss led the company's expansion its due diligence and fraud investigative services in local corporate and legal communities.

== Legal career ==
Weiss joined the United States Attorney's Office for the Central District of California in 1994. He was assigned to the Public Corruption and Government Fraud Section and the Major Frauds Section, and he brought cases involving white collar crime, corruption, civil rights, and violent crimes. He initiated the government’s prosecution of a Los Angeles Superior Court Judge who had conducted an affair with a defendant in his court.

== Political career ==
=== Los Angeles City Council ===
In 2001, Weiss was elected to the Los Angeles City Council from 5th district, defeating former state senator, assemblyman and gubernatorial candidate Tom Hayden by 369 votes.

During his tenure on the Los Angeles City Council, Weiss chaired the Public Safety Committee; the Redistricting Committee; the Arts, Health and Humanities Committee; and, the Information Technology and General Services Committee. He also served on the Planning and Land Use Management Committee, and contributed to the unsuccessful bid to hold the 2016 Summer Olympics in Los Angeles.

Weiss supported the efforts of Mayor Antonio Villaraigosa and Police Chief William Bratton to increase the City's trash collection fees to raise funds to hire new police officers.

Weiss was active on issues involving homeland security and the police department. He was a frequent speaker and author on the topic of terrorism preparedness. During his tenure on the Council, Weiss wrote legislation that toughened the city’s gun laws, and he served as the founding chair of the Santa Monica Bay Restoration Commission. In 2002, Weiss wrote a ten-point plan called "Preparing Los Angeles for Terrorism." Weiss was also an outspoken supporter of the State of Israel.

Weiss won reelection in 2005 with 71.9% of the vote.

As a city councilmember, Weiss was criticized for accepting campaign contributions from real estate developers and their representatives. In particular, Weiss accepted 78 political contributions from subcontractors for developer Alan Casden. Additionally, a vice president of Casden Properties made contributions to the Weiss campaign that were later deemed to violate city campaign finance law. Weiss not accused of any wrongdoing by the either the city or state. The California Fair Political Practices Commission ruled that there was no evidence that the Weiss was aware of the source or illegal nature of the donations.

=== Campaign for Los Angeles City Attorney ===
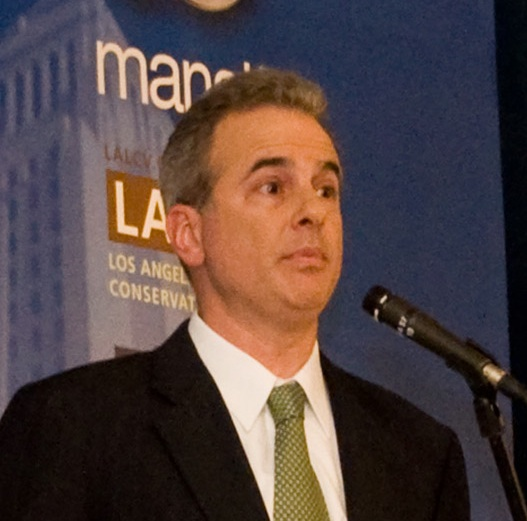
Weiss in 2009.

In 2007, Weiss announced that he would run for Los Angeles City Attorney seat in 2009, when incumbent Rocky Delgadillo would be forced from office by term limits. That May, a group of residents in his district launched a campaign to try to force a recall election of Weiss, accusing him of being too supportive of large development projects. Weiss said the developments were permitted under the city’s zoning laws and would bring needed jobs, housing, property taxes and other infrastructure improvements to the area. The group never turned in its petitions to the city, but claimed to have gathered 20,000 signatures.

Weiss finished first with 36 percent of the vote in the primary election for City Attorney, but was forced into a runoff against Carmen Trutanich, an attorney in private practice. Several members of the Council threw their support behind Trutanich and Weiss was frequently criticized for his close relationship with Villaraigosa, whose popularity had fallen and who had won reelection in March by a much lower margin than expected. Weiss was also criticized for accepting money from Benjamin Reznik, a lobbyist with a long history of suing the city.

== Community involvement ==
He has served as a member of the UCLA School of Law Alumni Association Board of Directors, the Cesar Chavez Foundation, and the Pacific Council on International Policy. He serves as a fellow for the Truman National Security Project. While serving as a council member, Weiss was notified that he was a bone marrow match for a leukemia patient he did not know. Weiss donated bone marrow to the patient and later received the Legislative Award from the National Marrow Donor Program for expanding city medical leave for bone marrow donors. Weiss serves as a member of the board of the Younes and Saraya Nazarian Center for Israel Studies at UCLA, and is also a contributing editor to the Jewish Journal of Greater Los Angeles.

== Awards ==
During his career as a public servant, Weiss received numerous awards including:

- 100 New Democrats to Watch by Democratic Leadership Council
- Humanitarian Award from the Los Angeles Commission on Assaults Against Women
- Environmentalist of the Year Award from the Los Angeles League of Conservation Voters
- Distinguished Community Leader Award by UCLA Center for Community Partnerships
- Civic Leadership Award by Santa Monica Baykeeper
- Civic Leadership Award, Peace Over Violence

== Personal life ==
Weiss resides in Los Angeles with his wife, Leslie Kautz, a former Pentagon policy analyst who is a co-founder of an investment advisory firm. The couple have two children, Jacob Wolf and Mollie.

Political offices
Preceded by Michael Feuer	Los Angeles City Councilmember; 5th district July 1, 2001 – July 1, 2009	Succeeded by
