= Wally Knox =

American politician

Member of the California State Assembly from the 42nd district
- In office December 5, 1994 - November 30, 2000
- Preceded by: Burt M. Margolin
- Succeeded by: Paul Koretz

Personal details
- Born: February 7, 1947 (age 79) Fairfield, Connecticut
- Party: Democratic
- Spouse: Elizabeth Garfield (m. 1979)
- Children: 2

Military service
- Branch/service: United States Army
- Battles/wars: Vietnam War

Wally Knox (born February 7, 1947) was a Democratic Assemblyman from the State of California from 1994 until 2000. Due to term limits, he was ineligible to run again for the Assembly. Instead he ran for the 23rd district State Senate seat, but lost the Democratic primary to Assemblymember Sheila Kuehl.

== Pre-legislative career and personal life ==
Prior to his election, Knox served on the board of trustees of the Los Angeles Community College District. He was an attorney specializing in labor relations, and owned a small business. He was on the Executive Board of the American Jewish Committee. The first in his family to attend college, he graduated from Harvard University and Hastings Law School. He served four years in the U.S. Army and is a decorated Vietnam War veteran. He is married to Elizabeth Garfield, and has two daughters, Aviva and Tamara. They belong to Temple Israel of Hollywood.

== The 42nd District ==
Knox's 42nd Assembly district included the Los Angeles area communities of Beverly Hills, Brentwood, Beverly Fairfax, Bel Air, Century City, Hancock Park, Hollywood, Miracle Mile, Westwood, West Los Angeles and West Hollywood. In the San Fernando Valley, he represents Encino, Sherman Oaks, Studio City and Universal City.

== Assembly career ==
In the Assembly, Knox served as chair of the Revenue and Taxation Committee. He was also a member of the following committees: Judiciary, Housing and Community Development, and Public Employees, Retirement and Social Security.

Earlier, he served as chair of the Labor and Employment Committee. He sponsored the bill to reinstate daily overtime pay with flexibility for workers and employers. He was the author of a new law allowing parents to use their accrued sick leave to care for ill children. In 1997-1998, he was chair of the Select Committee on the California Middle Class, which examined the causes of stagnating wages and declining living standards for working families.

== Legislative accomplishments ==
Knox successfully fought to reinstate the renters tax credit and secured expanded tax relief for senior citizens.

He gained passage of anti-crime measures, including a one-gun limit law, intended to dry up the black market sales of handguns to gang members, youths and felons. He authored legislation that doubled the size of a successful crime prevention program that targets repeat offenders. He wrote laws to assist local law enforcement in apprehending street criminals and the prosecution of car registration tag thefts. He sponsored an effort that enabled the Los Angeles Police Department to trace and crack down on illegal handguns.

For four consecutive years Knox earned a score of 100% from the California League of Conservation Voters with a perfect pro-environment voting record. He authored new laws to prevent ocean pollution and to cut down on hazardous air pollution. He wrote the nation's first law requiring banks to disclose to consumers hidden charges for the use of ATMs. He is responsible for expanding State assistance to innovative start-up companies, in the high-tech, biotech and multi-media fields, through the new business incubator program.

Knox received the 1998 award for outstanding leadership from the Jewish Public Affairs Committee. He secured passage of a crucial new law that helps Holocaust survivors and families of Holocaust victims recoup insurance policy payments denied them by European insurance companies. He authored a landmark law requiring insurers to disclose Holocaust-era policy information to a public State registry, or lose their license to operate in California.
