= BlueLine Grid =

Communications platform for civil servants and private security firms

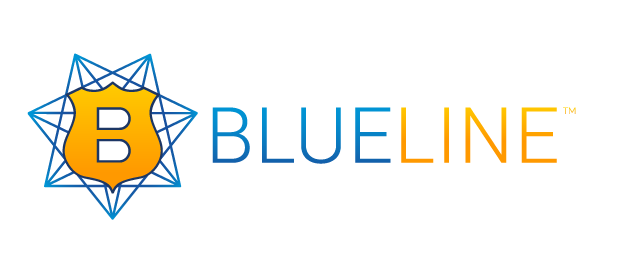
- BlueLine Grid logo (as of December 6, 2013)

- Screenshot BlueLine Grid homepage as of July 2014
- Available in: English
- Area served: U.S.
- Founders: Bill Bratton; Jack Weiss; David Riker
- Industry: Internet
- Revenue: Subscription
- Website: www.bluelinegrid.com
- Launched: January 2013
- Current status: Active

BlueLine Grid is a company that provides a mobile communication and mass notification platform built for interagency communication between civil service employees and private sector security teams. BlueLine Grid was created by Bill Bratton, the 42nd Commissioner of the NYPD (under 109th Mayor Bill de Blasio), formerly the 38th Commissioner of NYPD, and Chief of LAPD with co-founders Jack Weiss, and David Riker. The company was founded in January 2013, while the BlueLine Grid mobile app was launched in May 2014. The platform does not require registration to join, but verification is necessary for public employees or partners to gain access to connections and information in the Grid.

== History ==
BlueLine Grid was co-founded by Bill Bratton, Jack Weiss, and David Riker as Bratton Technologies. Bratton, Weiss and Riker initially founded Bratton Technologies as a professional networking platform for law enforcement officials called BlueLine Connect. Later, Bratton Technologies became BlueLine Grid and the company launched a new product, also called BlueLine Grid, in May 2014.

In July 2014, BlueLine Grid was recognized as one of the AlwaysOn Global 100 Companies to Watch.

== Service ==
BlueLine Grid provides a specialized messenger application that connects public employees and their partners. An official agency or government email is not required to use the application, but it is necessary for identities to be verified in order to access the connections or information within the Grid. Whereas the BlueLine Connect service was exclusively for law enforcement officials, the BlueLine Grid platform can be downloaded by anyone for its services, but the registry is restricted to verified public employees. The application allows users to be able to find local public employees by area, agency, and proximity to connect, communicate, or collaborate. All data in The Grid is based on publicly available information. Only people that users are connected to and other verified public employees can view profile information, which does not contain personal contact information.
