= Paul Koretz =

American politician

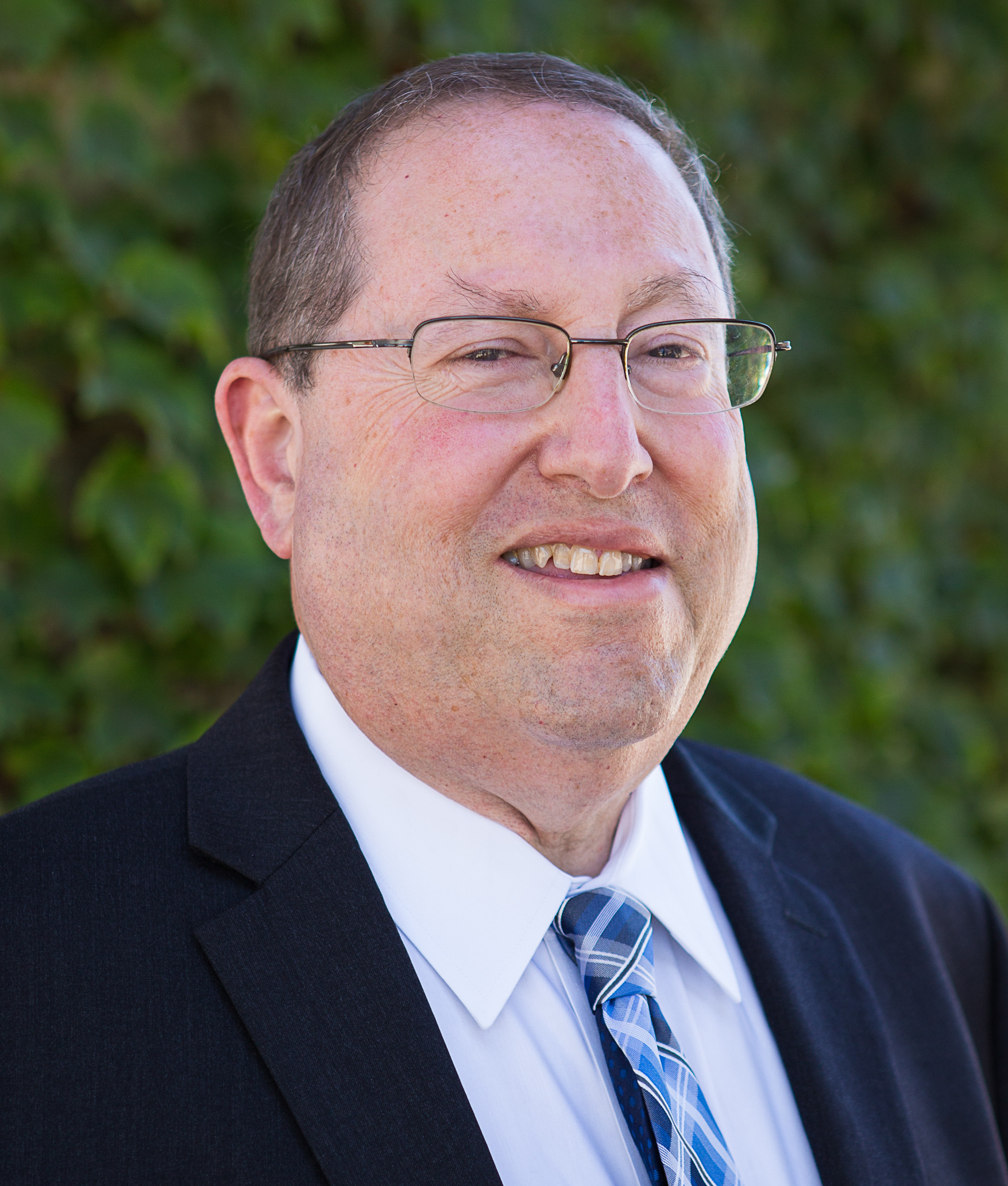
- Koretz in 2016

Member of the Los Angeles City Council from the 5th district
- In office July 1, 2009 – December 9, 2022
- Preceded by: Jack Weiss
- Succeeded by: Katy Yaroslavsky

Member of the California State Assembly from the 42nd district
- In office December 4, 2000 – November 30, 2006
- Preceded by: Wally Knox
- Succeeded by: Mike Feuer

Member of the West Hollywood City Council
- In office 1988–2000
- Preceded by: Alan Viterbi
- Succeeded by: John Duran

Personal details
- Born: April 3, 1955 (age 71) Los Angeles, California, U.S.
- Party: Democratic
- Spouse: Gail Koretz
- Children: 1
- Education: University of California, Los Angeles (BA)
- Occupation: Politician
- Website: cd5.lacity.org councilmemberpaulkoretz.com

Paul Koretz (born April 3, 1955) is an American politician, who served as a member of the Los Angeles City Council for the 5th district from 2009 until he was term-limited in 2022. He was previously a member of the California State Assembly and the West Hollywood City Council.

== Early life and career ==
Koretz earned a bachelor's degree in history from UCLA in 1979, where he was a founder of the "Bruin Democrats". While still a student at UCLA in the 1970s, he ran and was defeated for a seat on the Los Angeles Unified School District Board of Education. After graduation, Koretz worked as an aide to former Los Angeles City Councilmember Zev Yaroslavsky in 1975, and next as an aide to Los Angeles City Councilmember Marvin Braude in 1984.

After his marriage, he and his wife, Gail, moved less than a mile away from his parents' home to an area where his father lived upon immigrating to Los Angeles in 1939 after escaping Nazi Germany. Koretz cites his experience growing up as the son of an immigrant parent who worked as a waiter and union member of the Hotel and Restaurant Employees Union as one of his biggest influences.

== City of West Hollywood ==
In 1984, Koretz supported the creation of the City of West Hollywood from what was then unincorporated Los Angeles County. Koretz campaigned for the city's incorporation while managing the City Council campaign of Alan Viterbi and served as Viterbi's deputy after his election. Upon Viterbi's retirement in 1988, Koretz was elected to the West Hollywood City Council.

As Councilmember, Koretz appointed Kevin Norte to the city's Rent Stabilization Commission in 1992. Norte was the commission's first openly gay chair for two one-year terms. Koretz also appointed Equality California leader attorney John Duran to replace Norte as Koretz's appointee to the Rent Stabilization Commission. Duran would go on to succeed Koretz on the West Hollywood City Council.

=== Gun Ban ===
In 1988, Koretz sponsored a citywide ban on semi-automatic rifles, which built momentum for a subsequent statewide "assault weapons" ban. In 1996, Koretz co-sponsored the city's ban on "Saturday Night Specials." The city was the first to enact such a ban, which survived various legal challenges by the National Rifle Association of America. Koretz also sponsored an ordinance limiting handgun purchases to one gun per month in order to cut the resale of guns on the black market.

Koretz served as Mayor and City Councilmember for twelve years before being elected to the State Assembly.

Koretz's former colleague on the West Hollywood City Council, Abbe Land, was a candidate for Koretz's seat in the California State Assembly, and faced former Los Angeles City Council member Mike Feuer in the June 6, 2006 Democratic primary. Koretz endorsed Feuer, who defeated Land, winning 52.4% of the vote to her 36.3%.

== California State Assembly (2000–2006) ==
Koretz represented the 42nd district in the California State Assembly from 2000 to 2006, serving the maximum three terms allowed under California term limit law. The district included West Hollywood, Beverly Hills, Universal City, and the portions of the City of Los Angeles encompassing the Sunset Strip, Hollywood, Hancock Park, Los Feliz, Westwood, Brentwood, Studio City, Encino, Sherman Oaks, and North Hollywood/Valley Village.

=== Committee assignments ===
From his first year in the Assembly to his exit due to term limits, Koretz served as the Chair of the Assembly Labor Committee. He also chaired the Assembly Select Committee on Gun Violence and the Assembly Select Committee on California's nursing shortage. Koretz was also a member of the Health, Public Safety, Business & Professions, Insurance and Natural Resources committees.

=== Early environmental work ===
Koretz was the first Southern California Director of the California League of Conservation Voters and served as administrative director of the Ecology Center of Southern California. In the Assembly, he introduced legislation requiring retailers profiting from the most commonly littered items to share some of the costs of removing trash from storm water runoff, and he is the joint-author of legislation to ban the use of dry cleaner solutions found to be carcinogenic.

== Post-legislative service ==
In June 2007, Koretz was appointed by Assembly Speaker Fabian Nunez to the California Board of Podriatic Medicine.

== Los Angeles City Council (2009–2022) ==
=== Elections ===
In 2009, Koretz began his first term as a City Councilmember representing the 5th District of Los Angeles. He has been re-elected twice to the role, in 2013 and 2017. In 2017, Koretz secured 65.88% of the vote in the city's primary election.

=== Tenure ===
In 2018, Koretz lobbied successfully against California Senate Bill 827, which would have removed city control over local zoning. Koretz stated that the bill would "have a neighborhood with little 1920s, '30s and '40s single-family homes look like Dubai 10 years later".

In 2020, Paul Koretz, citing public safety concerns, voted against a bill to reduce the LAPD budget which passed by an 11–3 vote.

In the wake of racist comments by Council President Nury Martinez and other Councilmembers, Paul Koretz was one of the first Councilmembers, along with Mike Bonin and Nithya Raman, to call for the resignations of Martinez, Kevin De Leon, and Gil Cedillo.

=== Animal-advocacy and Legislation ===
Koretz chaired the City Council's Personnel, Audits and Animal Welfare Committee since 2011 and lists an array of achievements related to animal rights and animal well-being during his tenure.

Declawing Cats Ban

In 2009, Koretz called for a city-wide ban on the declawing of cats, saying the procedure caused ‘unnecessary pain, anguish and permanent disability’ to cats. The council gave the ordinance unanimous final approval positioning the city as one of eight in the State to ban this procedure.

Ban on Puppy Mills

In 2011, Koretz introduced a motion that prohibited the sale and purchase of pets bred in puppy and kitten mills. Koretz cited the often horrible, inhumane conditions in which animals are bred which lead to disease, and long-term behavior problems in cats and dogs. The mills also contribute to overpopulation, and the euthanasia of hundreds of thousands of animals. The proposal had the goal of increasing the number of animals who are adopted, rather than euthanized, from city shelters. On October 31, 2012 -Los Angeles City Banned the Sale of Commercially Bred Puppies and Kittens.

Protecting Elephants

In 2013, Koretz stood before Council asking the city of Los Angeles to take action preventing cruelty to elephants traveling with circuses. Koretz stated that he did his own investigation about circus practices before asking the council to take action. He played a video showing a young elephant hogtied in a pen during training sessions. In another scene, an elephant can be heard making sounds of apparent distress after an animal prod is applied to its skin by a trainer which was so distressful that Council President Herb Wesson cut off the video, provided by People for the Ethical Treatment of Animals, after a few minutes saying: “Mr. Koretz, I believe we’ve seen more than enough,” Wesson said. “I’m ready to vote.” The Los Angeles City Council voted to ban the use of bullhooks on circus elephants.

Koretz advocated for Billy, an aging elephant housed at the Los Angeles Zoo to be retired to a sanctuary 3 times over the course of a decade. First in 2009, second in 2018, with then Councilmember Mitch O’Farrell, and again in 2022 saying that “The zoo has successfully, up to this point, waited me out.” In addition to support from elephant advocates, Cher and Lily Tomlin, Koretz stated in his motion that Billy was "alone in a small enclosure where he was kept on hard surfaces not considered beneficial for his feet and joints, and allegedly received a lack of sufficient exercise and stimulation [and Billy has] long has been exhibiting abnormal (stereotypic) behavioral patterns many elephant experts characterize as indicating detrimental mental health impacts from that environment.”

==== LA Animal Services ====
In response to poor conditions in the Los Angeles Animal Shelter system in 2022, Koretz held a series of City Council Committee hearings with extensive public comment which led to the creation of a 48-page report detailing both whistleblower concerns and recommendations on how to improve shelter conditions. Koretz also proposed reinstating volunteers, increasing funding, expanding play programs, and improving volunteer relations. He noted, however, that neither the Personnel, Audits and Animal Welfare committee, nor he, as an individual Councilmember without full Council approval, has “an ability to order the Department of Animal Services to do anything.”

These actions were taken in response to Los Angeles Times articles which found that dogs were often confined for weeks at a time and several volunteers who were reportedly fired after whistleblowing on the shelter's staff shortages and inhumane conditions.

===== Banning the Sale of Fur =====
In September 2018, Koretz proposed an ordinance supported by animal rights organizations and activists to ban the sale and manufacture of new fur products in Los Angeles. The ordinance was approved by the City Council and Mayor Eric Garcetti in 2019, making Los Angeles at that point the largest city in the United States to have banned fur sales. The law went into effect in 2021.

=== Environmental Legislation ===
For over 10 years, Koretz remained the only constant member of the City Council's Energy, Climate Change, Environment Justice and River Committee.

Beyond Coal

In 2014, Koretz was the first City Councilmember to sign on to the Sierra Club's Beyond Coal campaign and he introduced a motion to significantly reduce carbon pollution in the City of Los Angeles, the first motion of its kind to be introduced in a major U.S. city. The motion called for the city to reduce its overall carbon output by 80 percent below 1990 levels by 2050 and also requested that the Los Angeles Department of Water and Power, the largest publicly owned utility in the nation, subscribe to a timeline that achieves carbon reductions that are 80 percent below 1990 levels by 2030. Ultimately, this led to the demolition of the Navajo Generating Plant, the largest coal producing plant in the Western US, in 2022. “The demolition of the smokestacks at NGS is a solemn event,” said Nicole Horseherder, executive director of the Navajo environmental grassroots group Tó Nizhóní Ání. “It’s a reminder of decades of exploitation subsidized by cheap coal and water from the Navajo and Hopi.”

Climate Emergency Mobilization Office

Koretz and Councilmember Bob Blumenfield introduced a motion to create a Climate Emergency Mobilization Office working with the LEAP L.A Coalition at the beginning of 2018, following massive winter wildfires. This motion positioned Los Angeles as the first city in the world to signal action must be taken to mitigate drastic climate change. The office launched in 2021 with former Mayor Eric Garcetti's support.

Building Decarbonization Ordinance

In 2021, Koretz authored a motion to decarbonize city buildings, making all new buildings in the city of Los Angeles net zero carbon by 2030 and decarbonizing all existing buildings by 2050. The motion said that "many well-meaning policies to combat climate change and pollution have left low-income communities with higher energy bills and worse air quality due to a disparity in excess to energy efficiency programs" and called for safeguards to prevent the burden of decarbonization costs being passed onto tenants, noting that current laws allow landlords to pass building improvement costs onto tenants.

Organics Recycling Ordinance

To comply with a Senate Bill 1383, adopted in 2016 as an effort to reduce emissions and which required organic waste to be reduced by 75% by 2025, the Los Angeles City Council passed a motion authored by Koretz aimed at expanding its residential organics collection program from the current 18,000 customers to 750,000 customers.

Expanded Polystyrene ban ordinance

Koretz introduced an ordinance, with Councilmember O'Farrell, calling for a ban on expanded polystyrene also known by its trade name Styrofoam as it is “toxic from production to usage to landfill.” The ordinance prohibits the sale and distribution of expanded polystyrene products for businesses with more than 26 employees beginning in April 2023, and for smaller businesses in April 2024. Koretz stated in council pointing to a Styrofoam cup with a chasing symbol on the back, said that the symbol implies the cup is recyclable. "But it's not," Koretz said. "It will never happen. This cup will never be recycled. It is chasing into a landfill. It's being chased into an ocean. It's being chased into rivers. But this will never be chased into a recycling plant."

Healthy Soils/Regenerate LA

Following the release of the United Nations World Meteorological Organization’s (WMO) urgent climate warning, Koretz and Councilmember Mike Bonin put forward a motion, approved by Council, institutionalizing the Regenerate LA healthy soils initiative. The legislative action will help to “drawdown,” or pull greenhouse gases from the atmosphere through a holistic, comprehensive effort by using the city's annual estimated 280,000 tons of food waste to build healthy soils on parklands and open space.

LA City Biodiversity Index

In 2017, the City Council adopted a motion introduced by Koretz that directed the city's Department of Sanitation and Environment to develop a customized biodiversity index. Said Koretz: “The creation of this groundbreaking L.A. City Biodiversity Index is the next important step toward the comprehensive, holistic wildlife and habitat protection ... [using] evidenced-based science to create policies that emphasize and encourage the interconnectedness of healthy ecosystems and healthy people across L.A. as we move forward into an uncertain climate-changed future.''

Opposition to bike-friendly Infrastructure

In the mid-2010s, Koretz blocked efforts to build a bikeway network on Westwood Blvd in Westwood, Los Angeles. Koretz claimed that the bike lanes would be dangerous and would increase traffic by taking the place of parking spaces and turning lanes. For alleged safety purposes, Koretz proposed moving the bike lane one block to the west to less-trafficked Gayley Avenue. As of 2026, no bike lanes have been created on Gayley Avenue.

Koretz blocked the provision of $50 million in State dollars for the "Uplift Melrose" project, a complete streets plan to revitalize Melrose Avenue which would have reduced Melrose to one lane for automotive traffic in either direction with no left turns. The plan included raised crossroads; bus lanes and covered bus stops; increased tree canopy cover Melrose; and separated bike lanes. Koretz, however, opposed the project, citing concerns regarding potential traffic in both directions. He also said in a letter that the plan would impact emergency responders, but was accused of NIMBYism by street safety advocates and critics.

Plant-Based Treaty

In October 2022, Koretz co-introduced a resolution unanimously approved by the LA City Council to endorse the Plant-Based Treaty, a global initiative to address greenhouse gas emissions from animal agriculture.

=== Housing ===
In 2019, Koretz opposed California Senate Bill 50, a zoning reform bill which would allow for dense housing near rail stations, major bus routes and areas with high concentrations of jobs. Koretz called the bill a "handout for developers" and said that more housing supply would destroy historic districts, destroy single-family neighborhoods, and displace renters.

=== Labor ===
A long-time supporter of the labor movement, in 2014, Koretz with Councilmember Cedillo introduced a wage-theft motion, approved by Council, to criminalize wage theft and increase penalties and fines on employers who unfairly cheat their employees out of pay. Koretz argued that this ordinance would give Angelenos another tool to battle wage theft, ensuring that workers get the money they deserve and leveling the playing field for businesses that follow the rules. During the COVID-19 Pandemic in 2021, Koretz and Councilmen Marqueece Harris-Dawson authored the Hero Pay legislation which required large grocery and pharmacy retailers to offer employees an additional $5 per hour in hazard pay. The motion is designed to also help shape future legislative policy regarding worker protections, essential services in neglected communities and strategies to address "food deserts.''

=== Security Grants ===
With the goal to keep young people safe in high schools, Koretz helped the Simon Wiesenthal Center secure a grant from the federal government to develop a security program in Los Angeles high schools. In April 2022, the Stop LAPD Spying Coalition filed a lawsuit over Paul Koretz's failure to respond to a public records request regarding his communications with the Simon Wiesenthal Center about this security program. Koretz responded by saying his office was overwhelmed with record requests and needed more time. The records were sent 14 months later, on the day of the lawsuit's filing.

=== Farewell speech ===
Following ongoing disruptions and protests of council meetings which began after the George Floyd murder in May 2020, Koretz ended his final speech as a member of the City Council with explicit language directed at activists by appropriating a quote heard hundreds of times from them during city meetings held by video. He received applause and a standing ovation by fellow Councilmembers, staffers, and members of the attending public, though he was criticized for his language by some commentators and constituents on social media.

== 2022 Los Angeles City Controller election ==
Paul Koretz announced his candidacy for LA City Controller in January 2020. Koretz faced criticism when a Commissioner of the LA Department of Water and Power held a fundraiser for Koretz's campaign for City Controller.

Paul Koretz advanced to the general election after placing 2nd place in the primary election with 23.67% of the vote. He was defeated in the general election by Certified Public Accountant and activist Kenneth Mejia, 60.8% to 39.2%. Paul Koretz conceded on Nov 9, 2022.

== Personal life ==
Koretz's wife, Gail, served as local government liaison for the office of Los Angeles Mayor Eric Garcetti. They have one child, Rachel. The Koretz family resides in the Beverly-Fairfax District of Los Angeles. He is Jewish.

Political offices
Preceded by Jack Weiss	Los Angeles City Councilmember, 5th district July 1, 2009 – present	Succeeded by Katy Young Yaroslavsky
California Assembly
Preceded by Wally Knox	California Assemblymember, 42nd District; 2000–2006	Succeeded by Michael Feuer
