= David Riker (entrepreneur) =

American businessman

- Education: Trinity College
- Known for: eCoverage, BlueLine Grid

David Riker is the co-founder of BlueLine Grid, operator of a critical communication platform for enterprise security and public safety.

In 1999, Riker founded one of the first online auto insurance companies, eCoverage, which allowed users to purchase and manage their insurance needs online.

== Education ==
Riker attended Trinity College in Hartford, Connecticut. He graduated from Trinity in 1993 with a Bachelor of Arts degree.

== Career ==
After graduating from Trinity, Riker worked for the Boston-based biotechnology company, Genzyme, from 1994 to 1996. Following his career at Genzyme, Riker founded a company that facilitated communication via interactive networks and video calls between investment bankers and institutional investors.

Riker was the founder and Chief Executive Officer (CEO) and chairman of the board of eCoverage, one of the first online auto insurance companies. Riker founded the company in September 1999, and it was sold in 2001 to the General Motors Acceptance Corporation.

Riker became the chief technology strategist for the insurance provider St. Paul Companies Inc. in 2001. In April 2006, Riker started Storm Exchange, a weather risk management company.

In 2013, Riker co-founded BlueLine Grid (formerly Bratton Technologies, Inc.) along with co-founders Jack Weiss and Bill Bratton—the current police commissioner of New York City and former police chief of Los Angeles. BlueLine Grid is a mobile communications application that enables secure communication for public safety and corporate security teams. The first app was released in May 2014.
