= California's 42nd State Assembly district =

American legislative district

Current assemblymember
Jacqui Irwin; D–Thousand Oaks
- Population (2010) • Voting age • Citizen voting age: 462,952; 358,808; 315,589
- Demographics: 59.56% White; 4.30% Black; 29.92% Latino; 3.88% Asian; 1.42% Native American; 0.30% Hawaiian/Pacific Islander; 0.20% other; 0.43% remainder of multiracial
- Registered voters: 230,889
- Registration: 35.29% Republican; 34.26% Democratic; 24.30% No party preference

California's 42nd State Assembly district is one of 80 California State Assembly districts. It is currently represented by Democrat Jacqui Irwin.

== District profile ==
Before redistricting in 2022, the district straddled the gateway between the Inland Empire and the California desert, stretching from Yucaipa and Hemet in the west to the Twentynine Palms region and western Coachella Valley in the east. It now covers the western suburbs of Los Angeles and eastern part of Ventura County, including Calabasas, Malibu, the Conejo Valley, Moorpark, and Simi Valley.

== Election results from statewide races ==
Year	Office	Results
2020	President	Biden 50.5 – 47.5%
2018	Governor	Cox 52.2 – 47.8%
2018	Senator	De Leon 51.8 – 48.2%
2016	President	Trump 49.7 – 45.6%
2016	Senator	Harris 61.1 – 38.9%
2014	Governor	Kashkari 52.8 – 47.2%
2012	President	Romney 52.9 – 45.0%
2012	Senator	Emken 51.6 – 48.4%

== List of assembly members representing the district ==
Due to redistricting, the 42nd district has been moved around different parts of the state. The current iteration resulted from the 2021 redistricting by the California Citizens Redistricting Commission.

Assembly members	Party	Years served	Counties represented	Notes
V. C. McMurray	Republican	January 5, 1885 – January 3, 1887	San Francisco	
John La Blanc	Republican	January 3, 1887 – January 7, 1889	San Francisco	
E. S. Saloman	Republican	January 7, 1889 – January 5, 1891	San Francisco	
Louis A. Phillips	Republican	January 5, 1891 – January 2, 1893	San Francisco	
William Hendrickson Jr.	Democratic	January 2, 1893 – January 7, 1895	San Francisco	
Isaac M. Merrill	Republican	January 7, 1895 – January 4, 1897	San Francisco	
Lorenzo A. Henry	Republican	January 4, 1897 – January 5, 1903	San Francisco	
Phineas S. Barber	Republican	January 5, 1903 – January 2, 1905	San Francisco	
George A. McGowan	Republican	January 2, 1905 – January 7, 1907	San Francisco	
Samuel T. Kohlman	Republican	January 7, 1907 – January 4, 1909	San Francisco	
Albert P. Wheelan	Democratic	January 4, 1909 – January 2, 1911	San Francisco	
Arthur Max Joel	Republican	January 2, 1911 – January 6, 1913	San Francisco	
Henry Ward Brown	Republican	January 6, 1913 – June 16, 1916	San Mateo	Died in office to cancer.
Vacant		June 16, 1916 – January 8, 1917	San Mateo	
Frank Leonard Eksward	Democratic	January 8, 1917 – January 3, 1927	San Mateo	While he was in office, he changed his party affiliation to Republican.
Frank Leonard Eksward	Republican	January 8, 1917 – January 3, 1927	San Mateo	While he was in office, he changed his party affiliation to Republican.
Harry L. Parkman	Republican	January 3, 1927 – January 5, 1931	San Mateo	
Bert B. Snyder	Republican	January 5, 1931 – January 2, 1933	San Mateo	
James S. O'Connor	Democratic	January 2, 1933 – January 7, 1935	Los Angeles	
Elmer E. Lore	Democratic	January 7, 1935 – January 6, 1941	Los Angeles	
Everett G. Burkhalter	Democratic	January 6, 1941 – January 6, 1947	Los Angeles	
Walter R. Hinton	Republican	January 6, 1947 – January 3, 1949	Los Angeles	
Everett G. Burkhalter	Democratic	January 3, 1949 – January 5, 1953	Los Angeles	
William F. Marsh	Republican	January 5, 1953 – January 5, 1959	Los Angeles	
Tom Bane	Democratic	January 5, 1959 – January 4, 1965	Los Angeles	
Bob Moretti	Democratic	January 4, 1965 – November 30, 1974	Los Angeles	
Frank D. Lanterman	Republican	December 2, 1974 – November 30, 1978	Los Angeles	
William H. Ivers	Republican	December 4, 1978 – November 30, 1982	Los Angeles	
Dick Mountjoy	Republican	December 6, 1982 – November 30, 1992	Los Angeles	
Burt M. Margolin	Democratic	December 7, 1992 – November 30, 1994	Los Angeles	
Wally Knox	Democratic	December 5, 1994 – November 30, 2000	Los Angeles	
Paul Koretz	Democratic	December 4, 2000 – November 30, 2006	Los Angeles	
Mike Feuer	Democratic	December 4, 2006 – November 30, 2012	Los Angeles	
Brian Nestande	Republican	December 3, 2012 – November 30, 2014	Riverside, San Bernardino	
Chad Mayes	Republican	December 1, 2014 – November 30, 2022	Riverside, San Bernardino	On December 5, 2019, Mayes left the Republican party and registered as an independent.
Chad Mayes	Independent	December 1, 2014 – November 30, 2022	Riverside, San Bernardino	On December 5, 2019, Mayes left the Republican party and registered as an independent.
Jacqui Irwin	Democratic	December 5, 2022 – present	Los Angeles, Ventura	
Deborah Klein Lopez	Democratic	December 2026 – present		

== Election results (1990–present) ==
=== 2024 ===
2024 California State Assembly 42nd district election
Primary election
Party	Candidate	Votes	%
Democratic	Jacqui Irwin (incumbent)	78,046	54.5
Republican	Ted Nordblum	65,155	45.5
Total votes		143,201	100.0
General election
Democratic	Jacqui Irwin (incumbent)	147,218	54.3
Republican	Ted Nordblum	123,940	45.7
Total votes		271,158	100.0
Democratic hold			

=== 2022 ===
2022 California State Assembly 42nd district election
Primary election
Party	Candidate	Votes	%
Democratic	Jacqui Irwin (incumbent)	80,404	55.9
Republican	Lori Mills	41,717	29.0
Republican	Ted Nordblum	21,629	15.1
Total votes		143,750	100.0
General election
Democratic	Jacqui Irwin (incumbent)	118,131	55.0
Republican	Lori Mills	96,482	45.0
Total votes		214,613	100.0
Democratic gain from Independent			

=== 2020 ===
2020 California State Assembly 42nd district election
Primary election
Party	Candidate	Votes	%
Independent	Chad Mayes (incumbent)	42,717	35.0
Republican	Andrew F. Kotyuk	40,893	33.5
Democratic	DeniAntionette Mazingo	38,492	31.5
Total votes		122,102	100.0
General election
Independent	Chad Mayes (incumbent)	120,401	55.6
Republican	Andrew F. Kotyuk	96,203	44.4
Total votes		216,604	100.0
Independent hold			

=== 2018 ===
2018 California State Assembly 42nd district election
Primary election
Party	Candidate	Votes	%
Democratic	DeniAntionette Mazingo	33,586	35.6
Republican	Chad Mayes (incumbent)	30,880	32.8
Republican	Gary Jeandron	15,032	16.0
Republican	Andrew F. Kotyuk	11,572	12.3
Green	Carol Bouldin	3,166	3.4
Total votes		94,236	100.0
General election
Republican	Chad Mayes (incumbent)	86,333	55.3
Democratic	DeniAntionette Mazingo	69,747	44.7
Total votes		156,080	100.0
Republican hold			

=== 2016 ===
2016 California State Assembly 42nd district election
Primary election
Party	Candidate	Votes	%
Republican	Chad Mayes (incumbent)	49,580	50.8
Democratic	Greg Rodriguez	40,446	41.4
Libertarian	Jeff Hewitt	7,601	7.8
Total votes		97,627	100.0
General election
Republican	Chad Mayes (incumbent)	97,864	57.4
Democratic	Greg Rodriguez	72,581	42.6
Total votes		170,445	100.0
Republican hold			

=== 2014 ===
2014 California State Assembly 42nd district election
Primary election
Party	Candidate	Votes	%
Democratic	Karalee Hargrove	22,973	37.8
Republican	Chad Mayes	20,921	34.4
Republican	Gary Jeandron	16,877	27.8
Total votes		60,771	100.0
General election
Republican	Chad Mayes	56,517	57.3
Democratic	Karalee Hargrove	42,082	42.7
Total votes		98,599	100.0
Republican hold			

=== 2012 ===
2012 California State Assembly 42nd district election
Primary election
Party	Candidate	Votes	%
Republican	Brian Nestande (incumbent)	41,217	61.2
Democratic	Mark Anthony Orozco	26,107	38.8
Total votes		67,324	100.0
General election
Republican	Brian Nestande (incumbent)	81,768	54.7
Democratic	Mark Anthony Orozco	67,823	45.3
Total votes		149,591	100.0
Republican gain from Democratic			

=== 2010 ===
2010 California State Assembly 42nd district election
Party	Candidate	Votes	%
Democratic	Mike Feuer (incumbent)	106,029	73.2
Republican	Mary Toman-Miller	38,836	26.8
Republican	David Hernandez (write-in)	17	0.0
Total votes		144,882	100.0
Democratic hold			

=== 2008 ===
2008 California State Assembly 42nd district election
Party	Candidate	Votes	%
Democratic	Michael Feuer (incumbent)	142,456	76.1
Republican	Steven Sion	44,803	23.9
Total votes		187,259	100.0
Democratic hold			

=== 2006 ===
2006 California State Assembly 42nd district election
Party	Candidate	Votes	%
Democratic	Michael Feuer	94,619	73.8
Republican	Steven Sion	27,539	21.5
Libertarian	Colin Goldman	6,101	4.8
Total votes		128,259	100.0
Democratic hold			

=== 2004 ===
2004 California State Assembly 42nd district election
Party	Candidate	Votes	%
Democratic	Paul Koretz (incumbent)	143,376	75.4
Republican	Paul Morgan Fredrix	46,715	24.6
Total votes		190,091	100.0
Democratic hold			

=== 2002 ===
2002 California State Assembly 42nd district election
Party	Candidate	Votes	%
Democratic	Paul Koretz (incumbent)	84,012	74.4
Republican	Jeffrey A. Bissiri	29,049	25.6
Total votes		113,061	100.0
Democratic hold			

=== 2000 ===
2000 California State Assembly 42nd district election
Party	Candidate	Votes	%
Democratic	Paul Koretz	100,238	66.6
Republican	Douglas Cleon Taylor	28,171	18.7
Green	Sara Amir	14,995	10.0
Libertarian	Mark Allen Selzer	5,665	3.8
Natural Law	Ivka Adam	1,352	0.9
Total votes		150,421	100.0
Democratic hold			

=== 1998 ===
1998 California State Assembly 42nd district election
Party	Candidate	Votes	%
Democratic	Wally Knox (incumbent)	81,130	74.0
Republican	Kevin B. Davis	24,140	22.0
Peace and Freedom	Nancy Lawrence	4,353	4.0
Total votes		109,623	100.0
Democratic hold			

=== 1996 ===
1996 California State Assembly 42nd district election
Party	Candidate	Votes	%
Democratic	Wally Knox (incumbent)	87,256	65.6
Republican	Adam Ross	37,921	28.5
Libertarian	Eric Michael Fine	5,699	4.3
Natural Law	Herbert Paul	2,203	1.7
Total votes		133,079	100.0
Democratic hold			

=== 1994 ===
1994 California State Assembly 42nd district election
Party	Candidate	Votes	%
Democratic	Wally Knox	74,303	63.7
Republican	Robert "Bob" Davis	36,932	31.7
Libertarian	Eric Michael Fine	5,441	4.7
Total votes		116,676	100.0
Democratic hold			

=== 1992 ===
1992 California State Assembly 42nd district election
Party	Candidate	Votes	%
Democratic	Burt Margolin (incumbent)	112,864	67.3
Republican	Robert "Bob" Davis	44,584	26.6
Peace and Freedom	Timothy Burdick	5,686	3.4
Libertarian	Andrew S. Rotter	4,478	2.7
Total votes		167,612	100.0
Democratic gain from Republican			

=== 1990 ===
1990 California State Assembly 42nd district election
Party	Candidate	Votes	%
Republican	Dick Mountjoy (incumbent)	48,922	57.9
Democratic	Evelyn Fierro	32,594	38.6
Libertarian	Scott Fritschler	2,975	3.5
Total votes		84,491	100.0
Republican hold			

== See also ==
- California State Assembly
- California State Assembly districts
- Districts in California
