= Jacqui Irwin =

American politician (born 1962)

- Irwin in 2015

Member-elect of the U.S. House of Representatives from California's 26th district
- Assuming office January 3, 2027
- Succeeding: Julia Brownley

Member of the California State Assembly
- Incumbent
- Assumed office December 1, 2014
- Preceded by: Jeff Gorell
- Succeeded by: Deborah Klein Lopez (elect)
- Constituency: 44th district (2014–2022); 42nd district (2022–present)

Personal details
- Born: Jacqueline Van Egmond; January 3, 1962 (age 64) Los Angeles, California, U.S.
- Party: Democratic
- Spouse: Jon Irwin (m. 1986)
- Children: 3
- Education: University of California, San Diego (BS)
- Website: Campaign website

Jacqueline Irwin (née Van Egmond; born January 3, 1962) is an American politician who is the U.S. representative-elect for California's 26th congressional district. Prior to winning the House seat she served in the California State Assembly. She is a Democrat representing the 42nd Assembly district, having previously represented the 44th. Before being elected to the Assembly in 2014, Irwin worked as a systems engineer at Johns Hopkins University and Teledyne, then served as a two-term mayor and three-term city councilmember in Thousand Oaks. She is currently the Democratic nominee for California's 26th congressional district in the 2026 election.

== Early life and education ==
Irwin was born in the Tarzana neighborhood of Los Angeles to Dutch immigrants John and Barbara Van Egmond, and grew up in the Woodland Hills neighborhood. She graduated with a systems engineering degree from the University of California, San Diego, where she was an Academic All American swimmer.

== Career ==
After graduating from UC San Diego, Irwin worked as an engineer for three years at the Johns Hopkins University Applied Physics Lab, then for five years at Teledyne. In 2003, Irwin was appointed to the Thousand Oaks Planning Commission, ran for City Council the following year, and became mayor of Thousand Oaks in 2008.

In 2014, Irwin successfully ran as a Democrat in the race to represent California's 44th State Assembly district, defeating Republican opponent Rob McCoy. Irwin has been reelected four times in 2016, 2018, 2020, and most recently 2022 in the new California's 42nd State Assembly district after redistricting occurred.

=== Legislative tenure ===
Irwin is the chair of the Assembly Committee on Revenue and Taxation, and the Assembly Select Committee on Cybersecurity, and the Assembly Select Committee on Gasoline Supply and Pricing. She also serves on the Committees on Agriculture, Business & Professions, Higher Education, and Privacy and Consumer Protection. She previously served as chair of the Assembly Committee on Military and Veterans Affairs from 2014–2021.

Irwin has also been appointed to other significant roles including the Governor's Military Council, and as co-chair of the National Conference of State Legislature’s Task Force on Cybersecurity.

==== 2015–2016 session ====
During her first term in office, Irwin passed significant legislation. Irwin improved the cybersecurity of the state by mandating state agencies undergo independent security assessments, she banned powdered alcohol, expanded the ability of University of California research to be turned into real-world applications, and worked with Attorney General Kamala Harris to create the OpenJustice Web portal to provide better access to criminal justice data.

==== 2017–2018 session ====
During her second term in office, Irwin helped secure critical funding for infrastructure projects in Ventura County, including $68.6 million for a grade separation project at Rice Avenue in Oxnard, California, and $9.5 million for emergency wastewater treatment facility repairs in Oxnard, California.

She continued her work passing significant cybersecurity legislation, enacting into law the first ever security requirement for Internet of Things devices. Irwin also significantly changed how California Community Colleges approached remedial education in an effort to get students into transfer level courses.

==== 2019–2020 session ====
In 2019 Irwin focused heavily on gun violence prevention legislation in response to the Borderline Shooting in Thousand Oaks, California. Her legislation strengthened Gun Violence Restraining Orders (GVROs), in part by allowing them to extend up to five years. She also required law enforcement agencies to have policies about using GVROs. Irwin also secured $3 million to support local law enforcement efforts to recover firearms from individuals listed in the Armed and Prohibited Possessors System.

In October 2019, Irwin pulled out of attending a fundraising event for the family of an officer killed in the Borderline shooting. After the Ventura County Sheriff's Office also withdrew from the fundraiser, citing a policy of non-participation in political events, the event was postponed indefinitely. An organizer of the event was later arrested in Florida for felony violations of charitable solicitation law and misusing charitable funds.

After her efforts to amend provisions of the California Consumer Privacy Act in 2019, which passed unanimously through the legislature and were signed by the governor, she received criticism for possible conflicts of interest based on her husband's position as COO of Ring. Irwin claimed that she consults with the Assembly's ethics officer on any potential conflicts of interest.

Irwin also authored ACR-17, which renamed a portion of U.S. Route 101 in Thousand Oaks after Sgt. Ron Helus, from the Ventura County Sheriff's Office, who died in the line of duty during the Borderline Shooting.

In 2020, Irwin shifted the majority of her efforts towards assisting her district's response to the COVID-19 pandemic. Irwin spearheaded efforts to collect personal protective equipment (PPE) for front line health care workers and organized blood drives during a local shortage.

Irwin also brought together local governments, academics, private businesses, and non-profits to conduct a COVID-19 antibody testing study in Ventura County. Irwin worked with the group to acquire reliable and available serology tests to be used for the study. She also helped identify and secure locations that would be utilized as testing sites for the countywide study which offered free COVID-19 antibody testing to residents. The antibody testing study was developed to not only understand the prevalence of COVID-19 in Ventura County, but was also modeled to understand the prevalence in targeted groups including first responders, low-income households, and those experiencing homelessness.

Irwin also set the highest level for recycled materials in plastic bottles, authoring a bill with Assemblyman Phil Ting to require plastic beverage containers to contain at least 50% postconsumer recycled plastic content by 2030.

==== 2021–2022 session ====
During Irwin’s fourth term in the Assembly, she continued to author landmark legislation into law. With support from Attorney General Rob Bonta, Irwin created new rules for online charitable giving providing protections for donors and nonprofits using website like GoFundMe, PayPal Giving Fund, and other online platforms.

Irwin also worked to protect the elderly from hospice fraud by prohibiting incentive payments, a problem highlighted by investigative journalism by the Los Angeles Times. She partnered with County Clerks to make permanent Californian’s ability to request vital records (e.g. birth, marriage, death certificates) online, rather than visit offices in person.

==== 2023–2024 session ====
Irwin, who has a background in the tech industry, has pushed for legislature to require artificial intelligence companies to disclose training data. Irwin championed AB660 which standardizes food date labels, confusion around which results in food being wasted. As of July 1, 2026, food products listed with the term “BEST if Used By” will be used to communicate peak quality, and “Use By” will be used to communicate product safety while the term "Sell By" is no longer allowed.

== 2026 congressional campaign ==
Irwin launched her campaign for California's 26th congressional district of the U.S. House of Representatives on January 8, 2026, shortly after the Democratic incumbent Julia Brownley announced her retirement. The district, newly redrawn due to the passage of Proposition 50, consists of a majority of Ventura County along with a small portion of northern Los Angeles County. Her campaign received support from Brownley, the California Democratic Party, and governor Gavin Newsom, among others. In the June 2 primary, Irwin received 41.3% of the vote and advanced to the general election, facing Republican pastor Sam Gallucci in November.. She won said election.

== Personal life ==
Irwin married Jon Irwin, a corporate executive, in 1986, and has three children.

== Electoral history ==
2014 California State Assembly 44th district election
Primary election
Party	Candidate	Votes	%
Democratic	Jacqui Irwin	24,225	44.7
Republican	Rob McCoy	16,811	31.0
Republican	Mario de la Piedra	13,116	24.2
Total votes		54,152	100.0
General election
Democratic	Jacqui Irwin	57,098	52.3
Republican	Rob McCoy	52,085	47.7
Total votes		109,183	100.0
Democratic gain from Republican			

2016 California State Assembly 44th district election
Primary election
Party	Candidate	Votes	%
Democratic	Jacqui Irwin (incumbent)	63,992	60.9
Republican	Kerry J. Nelson	41,145	39.1
Total votes		105,137	100.0
General election
Democratic	Jacqui Irwin (incumbent)	107,084	59.0
Republican	Kerry J. Nelson	74,417	41.0
Total votes		181,501	100.0
Democratic hold			

2018 California State Assembly 44th district election
Primary election
Party	Candidate	Votes	%
Democratic	Jacqui Irwin (incumbent)	44,028	51.9
Republican	Ronda Baldwin-Kennedy	37,342	44.0
Democratic	Robert Zelinsky	3,411	4.0
Total votes		84,781	100.0
General election
Democratic	Jacqui Irwin (incumbent)	95,622	58.9
Republican	Ronda Baldwin-Kennedy	66,758	42.1
Total votes		162,380	100.0
Democratic hold			

2020 California State Assembly 44th district election
Primary election
Party	Candidate	Votes	%
Democratic	Jacqui Irwin (incumbent)	73,294	62.2
Republican	Denise Pedrow	44,534	37.8
Total votes		117,828	100.0
General election
Democratic	Jacqui Irwin (incumbent)	132,679	60.7
Republican	Denise Pedrow	86,051	39.3
Total votes		218,730	100.0
Democratic hold			

2022 California State Assembly 42nd district election
Primary election
Party	Candidate	Votes	%
Democratic	Jacqui Irwin (incumbent)	80,404	55.9
Republican	Lori Mills	41,717	29.0
Republican	Ted Nordblum	21,629	15.0
Total votes		143,750	100.0
General election
Democratic	Jacqui Irwin (incumbent)	118,131	55.0
Republican	Lori Mills	96,482	45.0
Total votes		214,613	100.0
Democratic gain from Independent			

2024 California State Assembly 42nd district election
Primary election
Party	Candidate	Votes	%
Democratic	Jacqui Irwin (incumbent)	78,046	54.5
Republican	Ted Nordblum	65,155	45.5
Total votes		143,201	100.0
General election
Democratic	Jacqui Irwin (incumbent)	147,218	54.3
Republican	Ted Nordblum	123,940	45.7
Total votes		271,158	100.0
Democratic hold			

U.S. House of Representatives
Preceded by Julia Brownley	Member of the U.S. House of Representatives from California's 26th congressional district Taking office 2027	Elect
