= Carmen Trutanich =

American politician

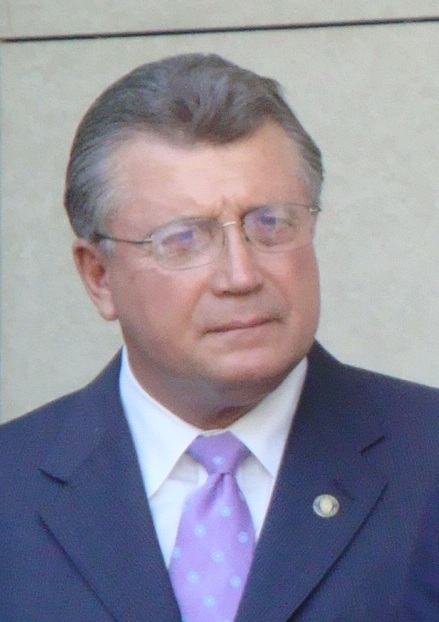

41st Los Angeles City Attorney
- In office July 1, 2009 – July 1, 2013
- Mayor: Antonio Villaraigosa
- Preceded by: Rocky Delgadillo
- Succeeded by: Mike Feuer

Personal details
- Born: August 12, 1951 (age 75) Los Angeles, California, U.S.
- Spouse: Noreen Beatrice
- Education: University of Southern California; South Bay University College of Law
- Occupation: StarKist FDS; Trutanich & Michel; Los Angeles City Attorney

Carmen Anthony "Nuch" Trutanich (/truːˈtænɪtʃ/ troo-TAN-itch; born August 12, 1951) is an American politician. He served as Los Angeles City Attorney from 2009 to 2013.

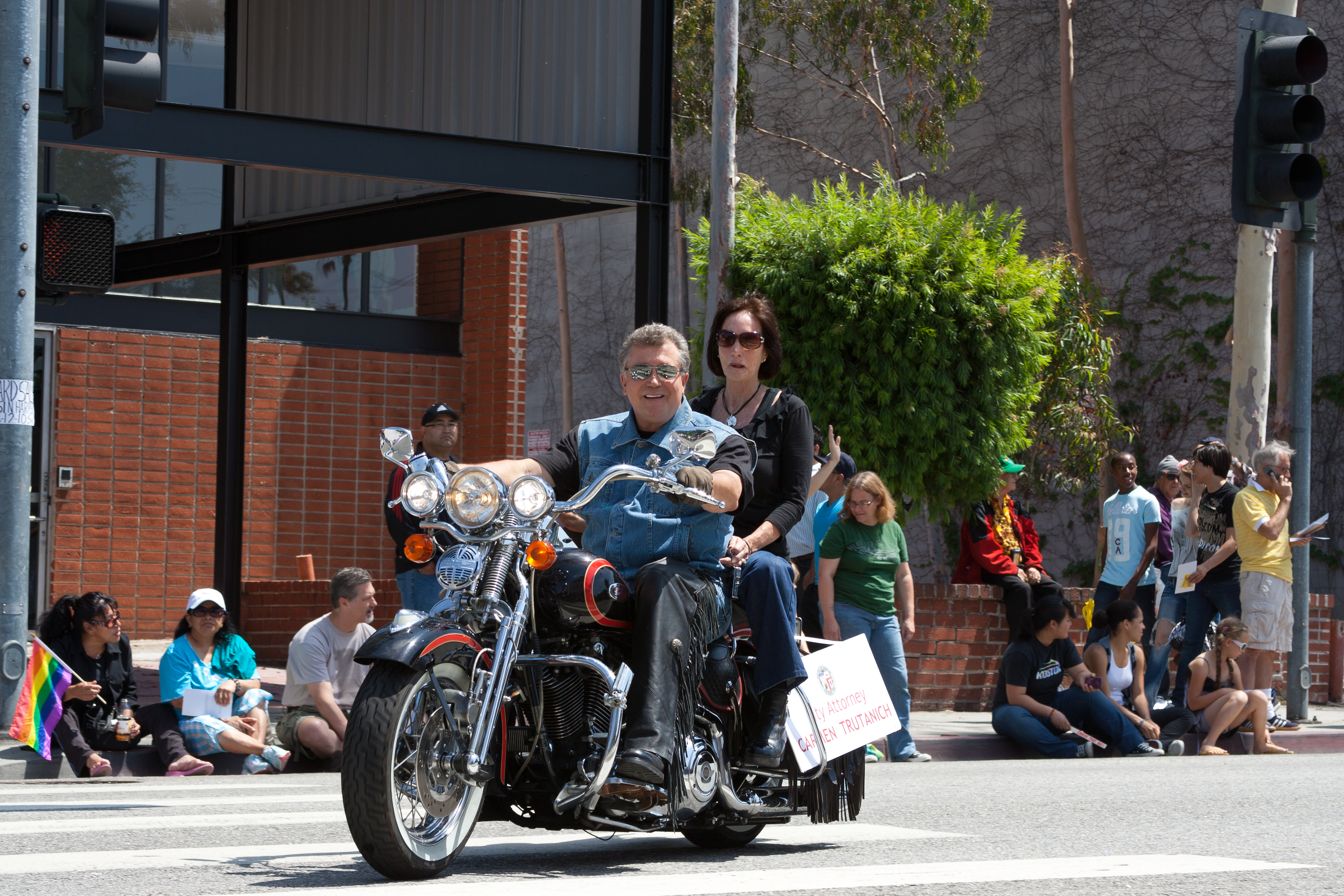
PRIDE 2010 Parade

== Biography ==
Trutanich grew up in San Pedro where he attended elementary and high school. Trutanich went on to attend the University of Southern California where he obtained a bachelor's degree in Business Administration with an emphasis in Accounting and Business Management. Trutanich earned his MBA from the University of Southern California where he was a member of Phi Delta Theta.

After obtaining his MBA, he worked in the tuna industry as a laborer for StarKist FDS, ultimately working his way up to a management position at his plant. Trutanich attended night school at South Bay University College of Law, graduating with a Juris Doctor in 1978.

He worked as a prosecutor on behalf of Los Angeles County before forming his own firm. Trutanich is a founding partner of the law firm Trutanich & Michel.

He is the father of Nicholas A. Trutanich, the United States Attorney for the District of Nevada since January 16, 2019.

== Los Angeles City Attorney ==
=== Election ===
In 2009, Trutanich won the runoff election, succeeding Rocky Delgadillo as Los Angeles' City Attorney by defeating Jack Weiss and winning the 2009 Los Angeles City Attorney Election on May 19, 2009. His campaign received endorsements from the Los Angeles Times, the Los Angeles Daily News, and the Daily Breeze, among other publications. His term began on July 1, 2009.

=== Tenure ===
In 2010, Trutanich proposed a series of reforms to streamline the Workers Compensation process. An audit showed that it previously took an average of 5.8 years to settle such cases, and Trutanich said that the program was "in disarray." Trutanich established a new peer review process to attempt to better settle such cases, and assigned seven new attorneys to the Workers Compensation division.

== Campaign for Los Angeles District Attorney ==
Trutanich formally declared his candidacy for Los Angeles County District Attorney on February 9, 2012. He was called a front runner based on his lead in fundraising and endorsements. Trutanich received endorsements from Sheriff Lee Baca and former opponent Mario Trujillo.

Trutanich's decision to run drew criticism from opponents in the race as well as a staff editorial in the Los Angeles Times. The controversy stems from Trutanich's 2008–09 campaign for City Attorney during which Trutanich promised to serve two full terms as City Attorney.

Trutanich's candidacy for District Attorney is three years into his first four-year term as City Attorney. In 2008, Trutanich challenged his opponent for City Attorney, Jack Weiss, to sign a pledge stating that he would serve two full terms as City Attorney and not seek higher elected office.

Under the terms of the pledge signed by Trutanich, if he did not serve two full terms as City Attorney he would have to take out a full page advertisement in the Los Angeles Times stating "I am a liar" and donate $100,000 to LA's Best After School Enrichment Program, which serves 28,000 students at 186 elementary school sites in Los Angeles.

In January 2012, Trutanich listed several law enforcement organizations as supporters who endorsed his candidacy.

As the L.A. Times reported, the organizations had not actually endorsed Trutanich. The campaign apologized and removed the organizations from its list of endorsements.

In February 2012 Trutanich's campaign claimed "broad support…from a vast online and grass-roots audience" based on one of Trutanich's promotional video receiving hundreds of thousands of views online.

After media attention, the campaign disclosed that it paid a marketing firm to generate many of those views.

On Monday April 9, 2012, Los Angeles County Superior Court Judge Joseph Kalin characterized Trutanich's decision to call himself "Los Angeles chief prosecutor" on the June election ballot as an attempt to mislead voters and Judge Kalin prohibited Trutanich from using that term or any misleading variations of it.

While Judge Kalin prohibited Trutanich from using the terms "Chief Prosecutor" or "Chief Criminal Prosecutor", Kalin did allow Trutanich to refer to himself as "Los Angeles City Prosecutor." Trutanich was defeated for re-election on May 21 by Mike Feuer.

Legal offices
Preceded by Rocky Delgadillo	City Attorney of Los Angeles, California; July 1, 2009 – July 1, 2013	Succeeded by Mike Feuer
