= Brian Nestande =

American politician (1964–2024)

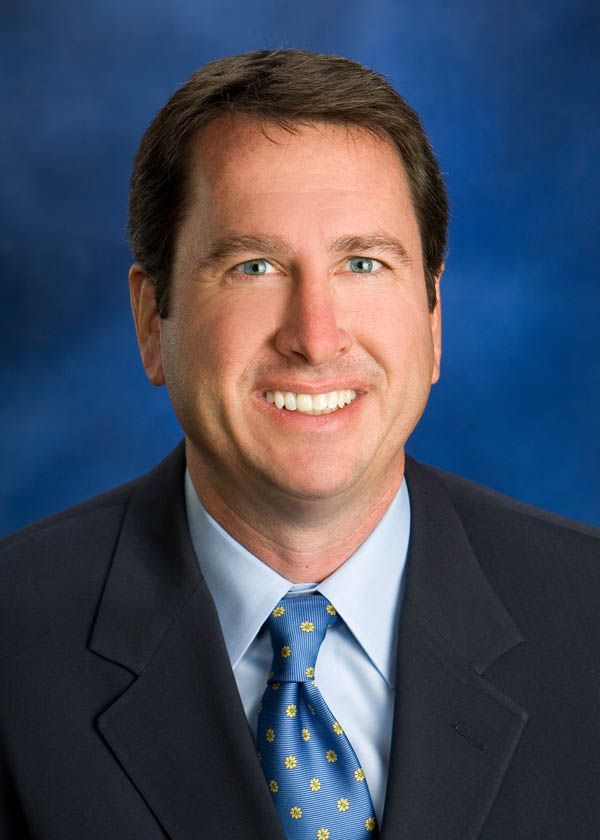
- Official portrait, 2009

Member of the California State Assembly
- In office December 1, 2008 – November 30, 2014
- Preceded by: John J. Benoit
- Succeeded by: Chad Mayes
- Constituency: 64th district (2008–2012); 42nd district (2012–2014)

Personal details
- Born: January 10, 1964 Newport Beach, California, U.S.
- Died: March 6, 2024 (aged 60) Palm Desert, California, U.S.
- Party: Republican
- Spouse: Gina Nestande (m. 2005)
- Children: 7
- Relatives: Bruce Nestande (father)
- Education: California State University, Fullerton
- Profession: Consultant

Brian Nestande (January 10, 1964 – March 6, 2024) was an American consultant and politician who was a Republican California State Assemblyman representing the 42nd district.

== Early life, education, and early political career ==
Brian Nestande was born in Newport Beach, California, on January 10, 1964. He grew up in a political family. His father, Bruce Nestande, was a state legislator and Orange County Supervisor during the 1970s and 1980s. Nestande graduated from Canyon High School in Anaheim in 1982. Nestande earned his Bachelor of Arts in political science from Cal State Fullerton in 1991.

Immediately after graduating from college, Nestande obtained a job as Deputy Campaign Manager of the successful congressional campaign of Michael Huffington in Santa Barbara County. In 1994, Nestande managed the successful congressional campaign of then-Palm Springs Mayor Sonny Bono. Nestande went to work in Bono's office as Chief of Staff until Bono's death in early 1998. Bono's widow, Mary Bono Mack, was elected to succeed Sonny, and Nestande served as her chief of staff from 1998 until 2000.

In 2000, Nestande built a government affairs consulting business named Nestande and Associates which was headquartered in Palm Desert. He represented a variety of clients working on issues involving alternative energy, health care, telecommunications as well as on other projects and issues in Riverside County.

== California State Assembly ==
=== Elections ===
2008

In 2008, Nestande ran for the 64th State Assembly district. He defeated businesswoman Kelly McCarty in the Republican primary 68%-32%. He won the general election unopposed.

2010

In 2010, he won the Republican primary, defeating Jeffrey Lemasters Tahir 76%-24%. He won re-election to a second term defeating Jose Medina 57%-43%.

2012

After redistricting, he decided to run in the newly redrawn California's 42nd State Assembly district. He won re-election to a third term, defeating Democrat Mark Orozco 55%-45%.

=== Tenure ===
The first bill Nestande introduced in Sacramento was to limit the number of bills a legislator could introduce. Nestande later led a bipartisan coalition that closed a loophole on out-of-state businesses.

In January 2011, Nestande criticized a proposal to cut in-home supportive services. He sponsored legislation to aid the Salton Sea restoration. He proposed legislation that would create online education standards, increasing college access to those unable to participate in traditional classroom instruction. In June 2014, Nestande expressed concern about the potential for money in the Governor's budget to be diverted from tech education programs.

Nestande argued that the state government should include unfunded liabilities when making spending decisions.

In January 2014, Nestande called for a hearing about the 43 employees with a criminal record hired by Covered California, the California state health exchange administering the Affordable Care Act in that state. In October 2013, he sponsored legislation requiring lawmakers who want legislative health care coverage to enroll through the Covered California exchange, saying "If we truly want to understand how the ACA is working and being implemented, there is no better way than to enroll in the exchange along with the people."

=== Committee assignments ===
2013

- Budget
- Governmental Organization, Vice-chair
- Health
- Insurance
- Revenue and Taxation

== 2014 congressional election ==
Nestande announced in May 2013 that he would challenge first-term representative Raul Ruiz, D-Palm Desert, to represent California's 36th congressional district in the United States House of Representatives. Ruiz defeated longtime incumbent Republican Mary Bono Mack in 2012.

Nestande, described by the Press Enterprise as the moderate candidate, received more votes than the conservative Ray Haynes, a former state assemblyman, in the blanket primary. Nestande won 34% of the vote to Haynes' 16%.

In September 2014, Roll Call wrote that Nestande "has proved to be one of the cycle’s more disappointing candidates" in terms of fundraising, but a campaign spokesperson in October 2014 told the Desert Sun that there was a "strong finance plan for the end game." The campaign also stated that opponent Ruiz is receiving financial contributions from outside forces, "while more than 90 percent of Nestande's money is from California."

In October 2014, the Press Enterprise offered their endorsement to Nestande who they write is "best-suited to protecting taxpayers’ money, tackling the federal government's mounting spending and debt and generally keeping government from hampering job growth and interfering in individuals’ personal affairs."

== Personal life ==
Nestande resided in Riverside County with his wife Gina and their seven children. Gina was elected to the Palm Desert City Council in November 2016 and became mayor in December 2019.

Nestande died in Palm Desert on March 6, 2024, at the age of 60. The Riverside County Coroner’s Office identified the cause of death as "multiple substance intoxication, including fentanyl and cocaine."
