= Nicholas A. Trutanich =

American attorney

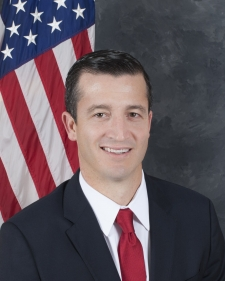

United States Attorney for the District of Nevada
- In office January 16, 2019 – February 28, 2021
- President: Donald Trump; Joe Biden
- Preceded by: Daniel Bogden

Personal details
- Education: University of California, Davis, (B.A.); Georgetown University Law Center, (J.D.)

Nicholas Andrew Trutanich is an American attorney who served as the United States Attorney for the United States District Court for the District of Nevada from 2019 to 2021. Prior to becoming a U.S. Attorney, he served as the Chief of Staff for the Nevada Attorney General's Office.

== Early life and education ==
Trutanich is the son of former Los Angeles City Attorney and one-time Los Angeles County District Attorney candidate Carmen "Nuch" Trutanich.

Nicholas Trutanich received his Bachelor of Science from the University of California, Davis and his Juris Doctor from the Georgetown University Law Center.

== Legal career ==
Before becoming a federal prosecutor, Trutanich was a litigator in private practice and a federal law clerk. He previously served as an Assistant United States Attorney in the Central District of California (he was based in Los Angeles), where he prosecuted a variety of federal offenses with an emphasis on violent crime and national security. He was also detailed to Iraq as the Deputy Justice Attaché to assist with counter-terrorism and rule of law matters. Trutanich later served as Nevada Attorney General Adam Laxalt's chief of staff.

== U.S. Attorney ==
On July 13, 2018, President Donald Trump announced his intent to nominate Trutanich to be the United States Attorney for the United States District Court for the District of Nevada. On July 17, 2018, his nomination was sent to the United States Senate. On January 2, 2019, his nomination was confirmed by voice vote. He was sworn into office on January 16, 2019.

On February 8, 2021, he along with 55 other Trump-era attorneys were asked to resign. He announced his resignation on February 9, effective February 28.

== Later career ==
In March 2021, Fox Corporation hired Trutanich as its chief ethics and compliance officer.
