= Rocky Delgadillo =

American politician (born 1960)

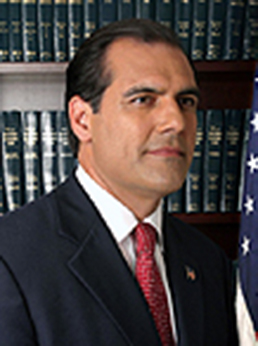
- Official portrait, 2005

40th Los Angeles City Attorney
- In office July 1, 2001 – June 30, 2009
- Preceded by: James Hahn
- Succeeded by: Carmen Trutanich

Personal details
- Born: Rockard John Delgadillo; July 15, 1960 (age 66) Los Angeles California, U.S.
- Party: Democratic
- Spouse: Michelle Delgadillo
- Education: Harvard University (BA); Columbia University (JD)

Rockard "Rocky" John Delgadillo (born July 15, 1960) is an American lawyer and politician. He served as city attorney of Los Angeles from 2001 to 2009.

== Career ==
- Teacher/Coach, Los Angeles Unified School District, Franklin
- Attorney, O’Melveny & Myers
- Director of Business Development, Rebuild LA
- Deputy Mayor of Economic Development, Office of Mayor Richard Riordan
- Elected City Attorney of Los Angeles 2001
- Re-elected City Attorney of Los Angeles 2005
- CEO of Los Angeles County Medical Association 2011
- Partner, Liner LLP 2011
- Partner, Sheppard Mullin 2024

== Biography ==
Delgadillo is a native of Highland Park, Los Angeles. He attended Harvard College, where he won the Robert F. Kennedy Award given each year to a member of the varsity football team. He went on to Columbia Law School, graduating in 1986.

He passed the California State Bar in 1986. After a short period in private practice at the prestigious Los Angeles law firm O'Melveny & Meyers, he joined Rebuild LA, a non-profit formed in the wake of the 1992 riots in Los Angeles. He later joined the administration of Mayor Richard Riordan, eventually becoming deputy mayor for economic development.

He ran against former Governor and Oakland Mayor Jerry Brown in the 2006 race for the Democratic nomination for state Attorney General of California.

== City Attorney ==
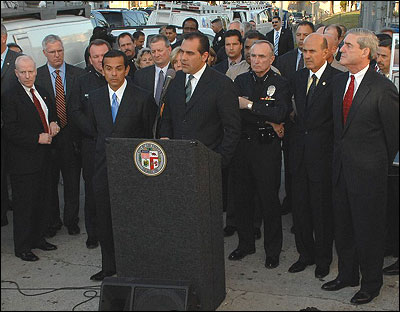
Delgadillo speaking in 2007.

As City Attorney, he subscribed to the "broken windows" theory of law enforcement. Among the programs Delgadillo implemented was a neighborhood prosecutor program that put city attorneys in each of the city's police divisions. He also sped up the implementation of civil gang injunctions, which largely limit association by gang members in certain defined areas.

Civil rights groups have challenged the injunctions, but the state's courts have upheld them. They have come under renewed attention recently, particularly in South Los Angeles, where some community members have complained that it is difficult for gang members to escape a sometimes intrusive law enforcement structure.

One of the most well-publicized prosecutions by Delgadillo's office that was clearly politically motivated was that of entertainer Paul Reubens, more commonly known as Pee-wee Herman, for possession of child pornography. After reviewing over 30,000 images and finding no child pornography, Delgadillo's office arranged a plea bargain requiring Reubens to pay a $100 fine for possession of obscene material and serve three years of probation. In a 2025 documentary about Reubens, the actor's publicist Kelly Bush Novak described the prosecution as "a homophobic witch hunt."

Delgadillo was criticized for recommending to the Los Angeles City Council that the City pay $2.7 million to black firefighter Tennie Pierce, who alleged he was fed dog food as a firehouse prank and later retaliated against by his fellow firefighters when he complained to superiors. Delgadillo argued that the city would likely have been forced to pay even more money to Pierce had the case gone to trial, in addition to legal costs, considering jury verdicts in past cases of a similar nature.

According to the Los Angeles Times, in September 2007, the City of Los Angeles agreed to pay Pierce $1.49 million to avoid going to trial, with the support of then-Mayor Antonio Villaraigosa, who had vetoed the earlier $2.7 million settlement offer proposed by Delgadillo, and the City Council. With legal costs to the City reaching an estimated $1.35 million, the taxpayers ended up having to pay out $2.84 million in the Pierce matter.

An agreement facilitating digital billboards in Los Angeles while he was seeking campaign funds from the industry created controversy as to possible bias in agreeing to the advertising expansion.

In 2007, Delgadillo's wife Michelle pleaded no contest to a misdemeanor charge of driving without a valid license. A bench warrant had been outstanding on Mrs. Delgadillo since 1998, after she failed to appear in court following a traffic incident. Delgadillo admitted that his wife had been driving his city-owned vehicle with a suspended license, and that she had damaged the vehicle, which was then repaired at city expense. He subsequently reimbursed the city for the $1,222 repair bill. It was also reported that Delgadillo had been driving his personal vehicle without insurance from June 2005 to July 2006; he said he was "embarrassed" by the situation.

== Awards ==
- "John F. Kennedy Profiles in Courage Award", Los Angeles County Democratic Party (2003)
