= 2024 United States House of Representatives elections in California =

- November 5, 2024

All 52 California seats to the United States House of Representatives
	Majority party	Minority party
Party	Democratic	Republican
Last election	40	12
Seats won	43	9
Seat change	▲3	▼3
Popular vote	9,138,709	5,928,084
Percentage	60.48%	39.23%
Swing	▼2.80%	▲3.01%

Democratic hold Democratic gain
Republican hold
Democratic
50–60%
60–70%
70–80%
80–90%
90–100%
Republican
50–60%
60–70%
70–80%
80–90%
90–100%

The 2024 United States House of Representatives elections in California were held on November 5, 2024, to elect the 52 U.S. representatives from the State of California, one from all 52 of the state's congressional districts. The elections coincided with the 2024 U.S. presidential election, as well as other elections to the House of Representatives, elections to the United States Senate, and various state and local elections.

House Majority PAC, a super PAC affiliated with the Democratic Party, announced that it would target four California Republicans in 2024: Mike Garcia of the 27th district, Young Kim of the 40th district, Ken Calvert of the 41st district, and Michelle Steel of the 45th district. Garcia, Kim, and Steel all represent districts that Joe Biden won in the 2020 presidential election, while Calvert's district narrowly voted for Donald Trump. There were two other California Republicans who represent Biden-won districts, John Duarte of the 13th district and David Valadao of the 22nd district. The 13th, 22nd and 40th districts flipped to Trump in the 2024 presidential election, with Duarte losing to Adam Gray in a split ticket vote. Several California Republicans received assistance from Protect the House 2024, a joint fundraising committee launched by former U.S. Speaker of the House and California Republican Kevin McCarthy to support vulnerable House Republicans. Among the representatives included in the committee were Duarte, Valadao, Garcia, Calvert, and Steel, as well as Kevin Kiley of the 3rd district.

Democrats gained three seats, defeating John Duarte, Mike Garcia, and Michelle Steel.

== Overview ==
=== Statewide ===
United States House of Representatives elections in California, 2024 primary election — March 5, 2024
Party	Votes	Percentage	Candidates	Advancing to general	Seats contesting
Democratic	4,341,055	59.60	125	54	51
Republican	2,836,256	38.94	88	49	48
No party preference	71,144	0.98	21	1	1
Green	15,741	0.22	2	0	0
Peace and Freedom	14,042	0.19	3	0	0
Libertarian	4,995	0.07	2	0	0
Total	7,283,233	100.00	241	104	—

United States House of Representatives elections in California, 2024 General election — November 5, 2024
Party	Votes	Percentage	Seats before	Seats after	+/–
Democratic	9,138,709	60.48%	40	43	▲3
Republican	5,928,084	39.23%	12	9	▼3
No party preference	44,450	0.29%	0	0	Steady
Valid votes	15,111,243	93.63%	—	—	—
Invalid votes	1,028,801	6.37%	—	—	—
Totals	16,140,044	100.00%	52	52	—
Voter turnout	66.88% (registered voters); 56.15% (eligible voters)				

Popular vote
Democratic	60.48%
Republican	39.23%
Independent	0.29%

House seats
Democratic	82.69%
Republican	17.31%

=== District ===
Results of the 2024 United States House of Representatives elections in California by district:

District	Democratic		Republican		Independent		Total		Result
District	Votes	%	Votes	%	Votes	%	Votes	%	Result
District 1	110,636	34.66%	208,592	65.34%	0	0.00%	319,228	100.00%	Republican hold
District 2	272,883	71.88%	106,734	28.12%	0	0.00%	379,617	100.00%	Democratic hold
District 3	188,067	44.53%	234,246	55.47%	0	0.00%	422,313	100.00%	Republican hold
District 4	227,730	66.46%	114,950	33.54%	0	0.00%	342,680	100.00%	Democratic hold
District 5	140,919	38.23%	227,643	61.77%	0	0.00%	368,562	100.00%	Republican hold
District 6	165,408	57.62%	121,664	42.38%	0	0.00%	287,072	100.00%	Democratic hold
District 7	197,429	66.75%	98,341	33.25%	0	0.00%	295,770	100.00%	Democratic hold
District 8	201,962	73.97%	71,068	26.03%	0	0.00%	273,030	100.00%	Democratic hold
District 9	130,183	51.79%	121,174	48.21%	0	0.00%	251,357	100.00%	Democratic hold
District 10	242,325	66.47%	122,219	33.53%	0	0.00%	364,544	100.00%	Democratic hold
District 11	274,796	81.03%	64,315	18.97%	0	0.00%	339,111	100.00%	Democratic hold
District 12	283,025	100.00%	0	0.00%	0	0.00%	283,025	100.00%	Democratic hold
District 13	105,554	50.04%	105,367	49.96%	0	0.00%	210,921	100.00%	Democratic gain
District 14	187,263	67.75%	89,125	32.25%	0	0.00%	276,388	100.00%	Democratic hold
District 15	211,648	73.10%	77,896	26.90%	0	0.00%	289,544	100.00%	Democratic hold
District 16	308,476	100.00%	0	0.00%	0	0.00%	308,476	100.00%	Democratic hold
District 17	172,462	67.66%	82,415	32.34%	0	0.00%	254,877	100.00%	Democratic hold
District 18	147,674	64.62%	80,832	35.38%	0	0.00%	228,506	100.00%	Democratic hold
District 19	252,458	69.30%	111,862	30.70%	0	0.00%	364,320	100.00%	Democratic hold
District 20	0	0.00%	288,788	100.00%	0	0.00%	288,788	100.00%	Republican hold
District 21	102,798	52.57%	92,733	47.43%	0	0.00%	195,531	100.00%	Democratic hold
District 22	78,023	46.58%	89,484	53.42%	0	0.00%	167,507	100.00%	Republican hold
District 23	105,563	39.86%	159,286	60.14%	0	0.00%	264,849	100.00%	Republican hold
District 24	214,724	62.70%	127,755	37.30%	0	0.00%	342,479	100.00%	Democratic hold
District 25	137,837	56.25%	107,194	43.75%	0	0.00%	245,031	100.00%	Democratic hold
District 26	187,393	56.05%	146,913	43.95%	0	0.00%	334,306	100.00%	Democratic hold
District 27	154,040	51.33%	146,050	48.67%	0	0.00%	300,090	100.00%	Democratic gain
District 28	204,489	64.93%	110,455	35.07%	0	0.00%	314,944	100.00%	Democratic hold
District 29	146,312	69.78%	63,374	30.22%	0	0.00%	209,686	100.00%	Democratic hold
District 30	213,100	68.38%	98,559	31.62%	0	0.00%	311,659	100.00%	Democratic hold
District 31	148,095	59.73%	99,856	40.27%	0	0.00%	247,951	100.00%	Democratic hold
District 32	212,934	66.20%	108,711	33.80%	0	0.00%	321,645	100.00%	Democratic hold
District 33	137,197	58.81%	96,078	41.19%	0	0.00%	233,275	100.00%	Democratic hold
District 34	189,414	100.00%	0	0.00%	0	0.00%	189,414	100.00%	Democratic hold
District 35	136,413	58.41%	97,142	41.59%	0	0.00%	233,555	100.00%	Democratic hold
District 36	246,002	68.72%	111,985	31.28%	0	0.00%	357,987	100.00%	Democratic hold
District 37	160,364	78.30%	0	0.00%	44,450	21.70%	204,814	100.00%	Democratic hold
District 38	165,110	59.84%	110,818	40.16%	0	0.00%	275,928	100.00%	Democratic hold
District 39	130,191	56.69%	99,469	43.31%	0	0.00%	229,660	100.00%	Democratic hold
District 40	171,637	44.74%	211,998	55.26%	0	0.00%	383,635	100.00%	Republican hold
District 41	171,229	48.31%	183,216	51.69%	0	0.00%	354,445	100.00%	Republican hold
District 42	159,153	68.14%	74,410	31.86%	0	0.00%	233,563	100.00%	Democratic hold
District 43	160,080	75.07%	53,152	24.93%	0	0.00%	213,232	100.00%	Democratic hold
District 44	164,765	71.37%	66,087	28.63%	0	0.00%	230,852	100.00%	Democratic hold
District 45	158,264	50.10%	157,611	49.90%	0	0.00%	315,875	100.00%	Democratic gain
District 46	134,013	63.43%	77,279	36.57%	0	0.00%	211,292	100.00%	Democratic hold
District 47	181,721	51.44%	171,554	48.56%	0	0.00%	353,275	100.00%	Democratic hold
District 48	146,665	40.71%	213,625	59.29%	0	0.00%	360,290	100.00%	Republican hold
District 49	197,397	52.17%	180,950	47.83%	0	0.00%	378,347	100.00%	Democratic hold
District 50	231,836	64.27%	128,859	35.73%	0	0.00%	360,695	100.00%	Democratic hold
District 51	198,835	60.70%	128,749	39.30%	0	0.00%	327,584	100.00%	Democratic hold
District 52	172,217	66.31%	87,501	33.69%	0	0.00%	259,718	100.00%	Democratic hold
Total	9,138,709	60.48%	5,928,084	39.23%	44,450	0.29%	15,111,243	100.00%	

== District 1 ==
2024 California's 1st congressional district election
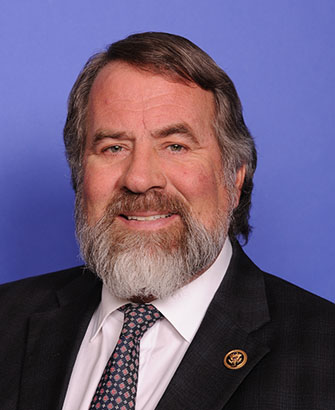

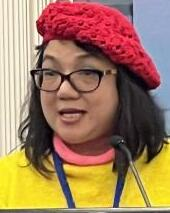
Candidate	Doug LaMalfa	Rose Penelope Yee
Party	Republican	Democratic
Popular vote	208,592	110,636
Percentage	65.3%	34.7%
- LaMalfa: 50–60% 60–70% 70–80% 80–90% >90% Yee: 50–60% 60–70% 70–80% 80–90% >90% Tie: 50% No votes
U.S. Representative before election
Doug LaMalfa
Republican
Elected U.S. Representative
Doug LaMalfa
Republican

The incumbent was Republican Doug LaMalfa, who had represented the district since 2013 and was re-elected with 62.1% of the vote in 2022.

=== Candidates ===
Advanced to general

- Doug LaMalfa (Republican), incumbent U.S. representative
- Rose Penelope Yee (Democratic), financial advisor

Eliminated in primary

- Mike Doran (Democratic), Shasta Union High School District board member

=== Endorsements ===
Doug LaMalfa (R)

State officials

- Mike Huckabee, governor of Arkansas (1996–2007)

Local officials

- Carl DeMaio, former San Diego city councilor (2008–2012)

Political parties

- American Independent Party
- California Republican Party

Organizations

- AIPAC
- California College Republicans
- California ProLife Council
- California Rifle and Pistol Association
- National Rifle Association Political Victory Fund

Labor unions

- IBEW Local 1245
Rose Penelope Yee (D)

Political parties

- California Democratic Party
Declined to endorse

Labor unions

- California Federation of Labor

=== Fundraising ===
Campaign finance reports as of February 14, 2024
Candidate	Raised	Spent	Cash on hand
Doug LaMalfa (R)	$549,612	$305,500	$610,802
Rose Penelope Yee (D)	$19,281	$18,465	$815
Source: Federal Election Commission

=== Predictions ===
Source	Ranking	As of
The Cook Political Report	Solid R	February 2, 2023
Inside Elections	Solid R	March 10, 2023
Sabato's Crystal Ball	Safe R	February 23, 2023
Elections Daily	Safe R	February 5, 2024
CNalysis	Solid R	November 16, 2023

=== Results ===
Primary results by county: LaMalfa—80–90% LaMalfa—70–80% LaMalfa—60–70% LaMalfa—50–60%

California's 1st congressional district, 2024
Primary election
Party	Candidate	Votes	%
Republican	Doug LaMalfa (incumbent)	122,858	66.7
Democratic	Rose Penelope Yee	41,669	22.6
Democratic	Mike Doran	19,734	10.7
Total votes		184,261	100.0
General election
Republican	Doug LaMalfa (incumbent)	208,592	65.3
Democratic	Rose Penelope Yee	110,636	34.7
Total votes		319,228	100.0
Republican hold			

==== By county ====
County	Doug LaMalfa Republican		Rose Penelope Yee Democratic		Margin		Total votes cast
County	#	%	#	%	#	%	Total votes cast
Butte	50,979	54.99%	41,729	45.01%	9,250	9.98%	92,708
Colusa	4,528	68.37%	2,095	31.63%	2,433	36.74%	6,623
Glenn	7,197	71.03%	2,936	28.97%	4,261	42.05%	10,133
Lassen	9,004	80.12%	2,234	19.88%	6,770	60.24%	11,238
Modoc	3,009	76.56%	921	23.44%	2,088	53.13%	3,930
Shasta	61,876	70.82%	25,489	29.18%	36,387	41.65%	87,365
Siskiyou	13,229	62.71%	7,865	37.29%	5,364	25.43%	21,094
Sutter	25,826	68.10%	12,095	31.90%	13,731	36.21%	37,921
Tehama	19,281	73.68%	6,888	26.32%	12,393	47.36%	26,169
Yuba (part)	13,663	61.97%	8,384	38.03%	5,279	23.94%	22,047
Totals	208,592	65.34%	110,636	34.66%	97,956	30.69%	319,228

== District 2 ==
2024 California's 2nd congressional district election
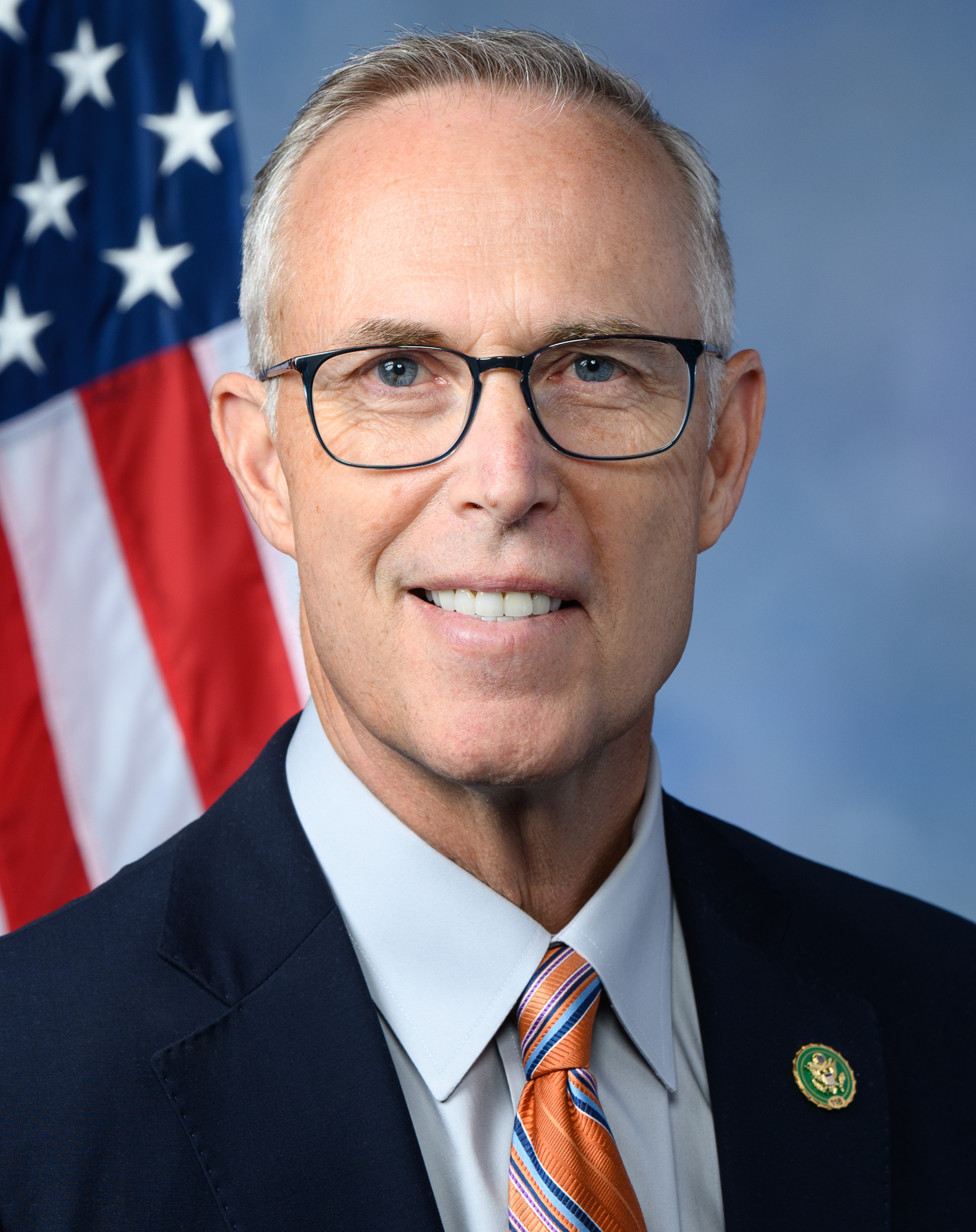

Candidate	Jared Huffman	Chris Coulombe
Party	Democratic	Republican
Popular vote	272,883	106,734
Percentage	71.9%	28.1%
- Huffman: 50–60% 60–70% 70–80% 80–90% >90% Coulombe: 50–60% 60–70% 70–80% 80–90% >90% Tie: 50% No votes
U.S. Representative before election
Jared Huffman
Democratic
Elected U.S. Representative
Jared Huffman
Democratic

The incumbent was Democrat Jared Huffman, who had represented the district since 2013 and was re-elected with 74.4% of the vote in 2022.

=== Candidates ===
Advanced to general

- Chris Coulombe (Republican), cannabis executive and candidate for this district in 2022
- Jared Huffman (Democratic), incumbent U.S. representative

Eliminated in primary

- Jason Brisendine (no party preference), businessman
- Tief Gibbs (Republican), office manager
- Jolian Kangas (no party preference), automotive business owner

=== Endorsements ===
Chris Coulombe (R)

Local officials

- Carl DeMaio, former San Diego city councilor (2008–2012)

Organizations

- California College Republicans
- California Republican Assembly
- California Rifle and Pistol Association (post-primary)
- Howard Jarvis Taxpayers Association
- Log Cabin Republicans PAC (post-primary)

Political parties

- California Republican Party
Tief Gibbs (R)

Organizations

- California ProLife Council
- California Rifle and Pistol Association (switched endorsement to Coulombe post primary)

Political parties

- American Independent Party
Jared Huffman (D)

Political parties

- California Democratic Party

Organizations

- California Environmental Voters
- California Young Democrats
- Equality California
- Friends of the Earth Action
- Humane Society Legislative Fund
- J Street PAC
- League of Conservation Voters
- Natural Resources Defense Council
- Planned Parenthood Action Fund (post-primary)
- Population Connection Action Fund
- Santa Rosa Chamber of Commerce
- Sierra Club

Labor unions

- AFSCME California
- California Federation of Labor
- California Federation of Teachers
- California Professional Firefighters
- California Teachers Association
- IBEW Local 1245
- International Brotherhood of Teamsters Joint Council 7
- National Education Association
- North Bay Building Trades Council

Newspapers

- Marin Independent Journal

=== Fundraising ===
Campaign finance reports as of February 14, 2024
Candidate	Raised	Spent	Cash on hand
Jared Huffman (D)	$485,944	$377,881	$1,036,873
Chris Coulombe (R)	$64,851 (Note: $11,250 of this total was self-funded by Coulombe.)	$52,815	$12,422
Tief Gibbs (R)	$25,938	$22,080	$3,858
Source: Federal Election Commission

=== Predictions ===
Source	Ranking	As of
The Cook Political Report	Solid D	February 2, 2023
Inside Elections	Solid D	March 10, 2023
Sabato's Crystal Ball	Safe D	February 23, 2023
Elections Daily	Safe D	February 5, 2024
CNalysis	Solid D	November 16, 2023

=== Results ===
Primary results by county: Huffman—80–90% Huffman—70–80% Huffman—60–70% Huffman—40–50%

California's 2nd congressional district, 2024
Primary election
Party	Candidate	Votes	%
Democratic	Jared Huffman (incumbent)	170,271	73.4
Republican	Chris Coulombe	38,039	16.4
Republican	Tief Gibbs	18,834	8.1
No party preference	Jolian Kangas	3,276	1.4
No party preference	Jason Brisendine	1,411	0.6
Total votes		231,831	100.0
General election
Democratic	Jared Huffman (incumbent)	272,883	71.9
Republican	Chris Coulombe	106,734	28.1
Total votes		379,617	100.0
Democratic hold			

==== By county ====
County	Jared Huffman Democratic		Chris Coulombe Republican		Margin		Total votes cast
County	#	%	#	%	#	%	Total votes cast
Del Norte	4,445	43.28%	5,826	56.72%	−1,381	−13.45%	10,271
Humboldt	40,870	65.35%	21,666	34.65%	19,204	30.71%	62,536
Marin	112,694	80.09%	28,012	19.91%	84,682	60.18%	140,706
Mendocino	24,262	63.73%	13,808	36.27%	10,454	27.46%	38,070
Sonoma (part)	88,087	71.92%	34,389	28.08%	53,698	43.84%	122,476
Trinity	2,525	45.43%	3,033	54.57%	−508	−9.14%	5,558
Totals	272,883	71.88%	106,734	28.12%	166,149	43.77%	379,617

== District 3 ==
2024 California's 3rd congressional district election
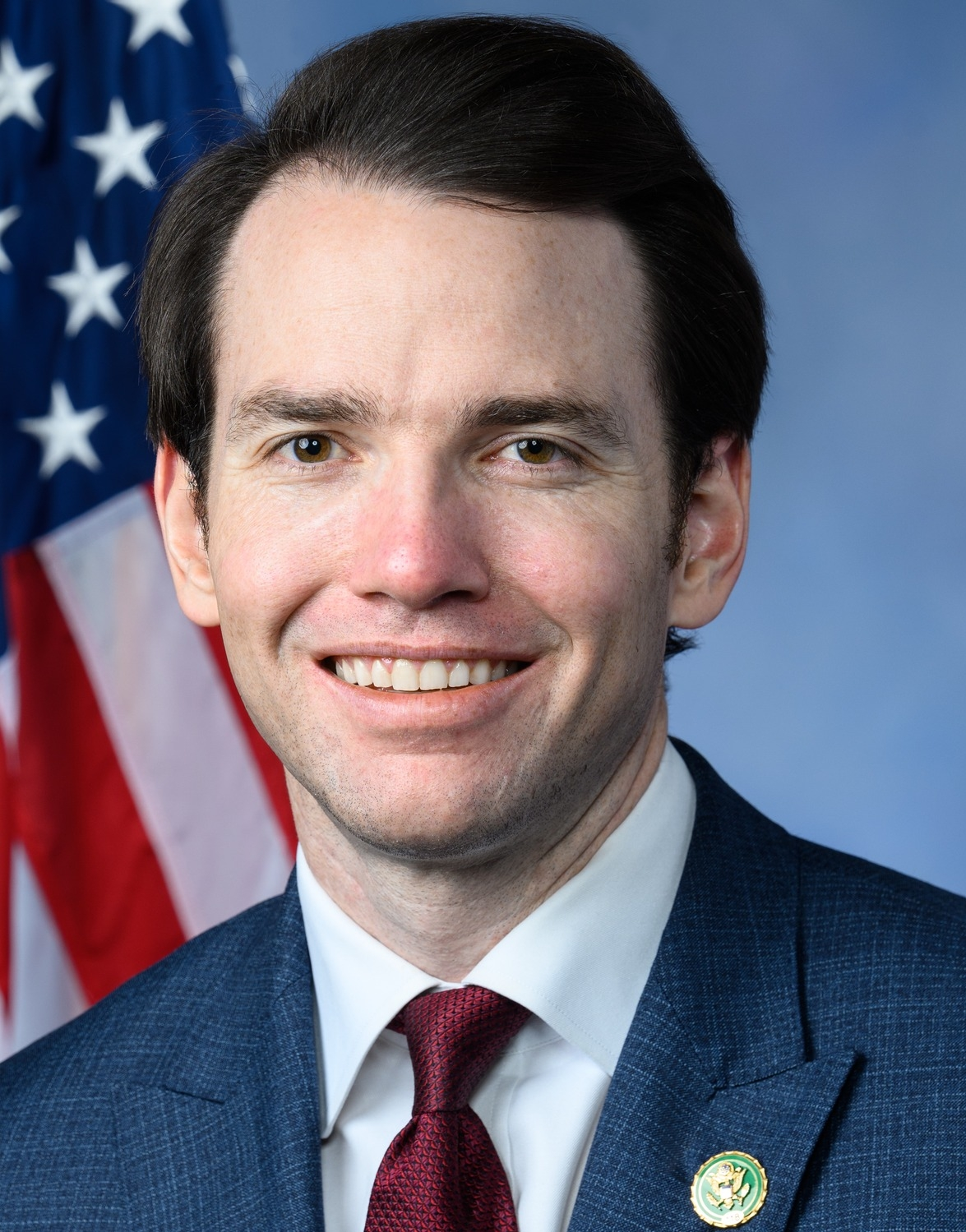

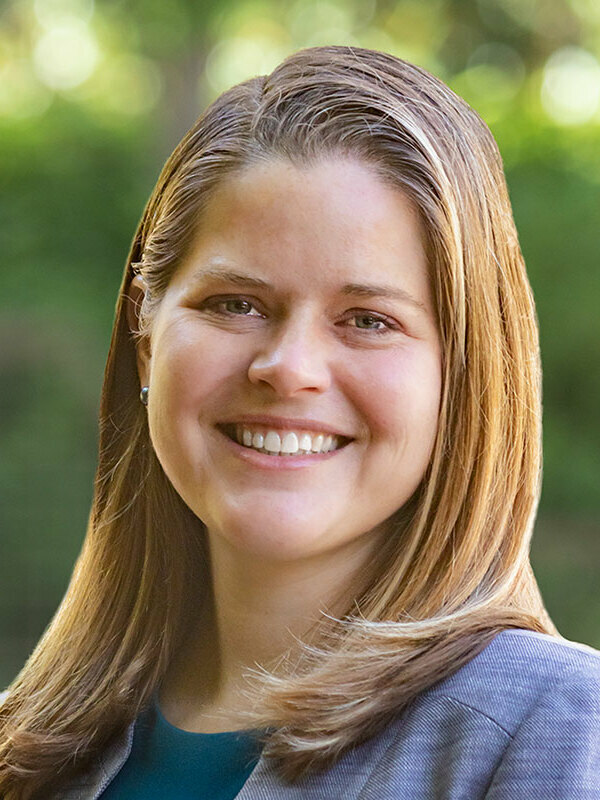
Candidate	Kevin Kiley	Jessica Morse
Party	Republican	Democratic
Popular vote	234,246	188,067
Percentage	55.5%	44.5%
- Kiley: 50–60% 60–70% 70–80% 80–90% >90% Morse: 50–60% 60–70% 70–80% 80–90% >90% Tie: 50% No votes
U.S. Representative before election
Kevin Kiley
Republican
Elected U.S. Representative
Kevin Kiley
Republican

The incumbent was Republican Kevin Kiley, who was elected with 53.2% of the vote in 2022.

=== Candidates ===
Advanced to general

- Kevin Kiley (Republican), incumbent U.S. representative
- Jessica Morse (Democratic), former deputy secretary of the California Natural Resources Agency and runner-up for the 5th district (Note: Numbered as the 4th district prior to the 2020 redistricting cycle.) in 2018

Eliminated in primary

- Robert Smith (no party preference), operational programs director

=== Endorsements ===
Kevin Kiley (R)

State officials

- Mike Huckabee, governor of Arkansas (1996–2007)

Local officials

- Carl DeMaio, former San Diego city councilor (2008–2012)

Organizations

- AIPAC
- California College Republicans
- California ProLife Council
- California Rifle and Pistol Association
- International Franchise Association
- Log Cabin Republicans PAC (post-primary)
- National Rifle Association Political Victory Fund
- United States Chamber of Commerce

Political parties

- American Independent Party
- California Republican Party
Jessica Morse (D)

U.S. representatives

- Lois Frankel, U.S. representative from Florida (2013–present)

Political parties

- California Democratic Party
- Sacramento County Democratic Party

Organizations

- California Environmental Voters
- California Young Democrats
- EMILY's List
- J Street (post-primary)
- Jewish Democratic Council of America (post-primary)
- National Women's Political Caucus
- Natural Resources Defense Council (post-primary)
- NewDem Action Fund (post-primary)
- Planned Parenthood Action Fund (post-primary)
- Reproductive Freedom for All

Labor unions

- California Federation of Labor
- California Teachers Association
- IBEW Locals 340 and 1245
- National Education Association
- SEIU Local 1021
- SEIU United Healthcare Workers West
- Service Employees International Union California

Newspapers

- The Sacramento Bee

=== Fundraising ===
Campaign finance reports as of February 14, 2024
Candidate	Raised	Spent	Cash on hand
Kevin Kiley (R)	$2,450,576	$484,923	$2,004,626
Jessica Morse (D)	$805,745	$349,729	$660,378
Source: Federal Election Commission

=== Predictions ===
Source	Ranking	As of
The Cook Political Report	Likely R	February 2, 2023
Inside Elections	Likely R	March 10, 2023
Sabato's Crystal Ball	Likely R	February 23, 2023
Elections Daily	Likely R	March 22, 2024
CNalysis	Lean R	November 16, 2023

=== Results ===
Primary results by county: Kiley—70–80% Kiley—60–70% Kiley—50–60% Morse—50–60% Morse—60–70%

California's 3rd congressional district, 2024
Primary election
Party	Candidate	Votes	%
Republican	Kevin Kiley (incumbent)	137,397	55.9
Democratic	Jessica Morse	103,443	42.1
No party preference	Robert Smith	5,007	2.0
Total votes		245,847	100.0
General election
Republican	Kevin Kiley (incumbent)	234,246	55.5
Democratic	Jessica Morse	188,067	44.5
Total votes		422,313	100.0
Republican hold			

==== By county ====
County	Kevin Kiley Republican		Jessica Morse Democratic		Margin		Total votes cast
County	#	%	#	%	#	%	Total votes cast
Alpine	263	36.28%	462	63.72%	−199	−27.45%	725
El Dorado (part)	18,052	53.73%	15,548	46.27%	2,504	7.45%	33,600
Inyo	4,660	53.69%	4,019	46.31%	641	7.39%	8,679
Mono	2,503	42.37%	3,405	57.63%	−902	−15.27%	5,908
Nevada	28,004	45.67%	33,317	54.33%	−5,313	−8.66%	61,321
Placer	132,825	58.31%	94,970	41.69%	37,855	16.62%	227,795
Plumas	6,044	60.88%	3,883	39.12%	2,161	21.77%	9,927
Sacramento (part)	36,075	54.62%	29,975	45.38%	6,100	9.24%	66,050
Sierra	1,115	64.12%	624	35.88%	491	28.23%	1,739
Yuba (part)	4,705	71.62%	1,864	28.38%	2,841	43.25%	6,569
Totals	234,246	55.47%	188,067	44.53%	46,179	10.93%	422,313

== District 4 ==
2024 California's 4th congressional district election
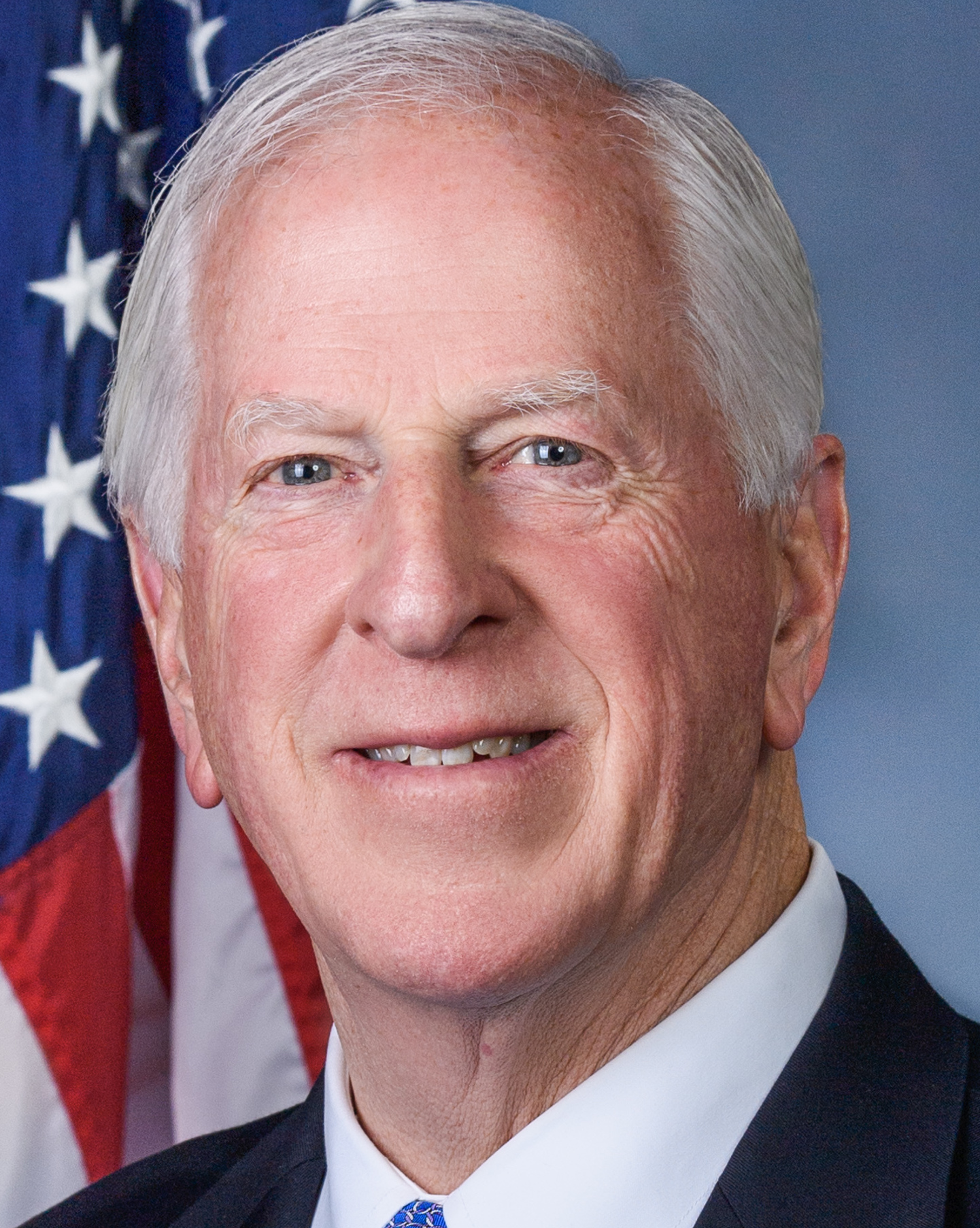

Candidate	Mike Thompson	John Munn
Party	Democratic	Republican
Popular vote	227,730	114,950
Percentage	66.5%	33.5%
- County results Thompson: 50–60% 60–70% 70–80%
U.S. Representative before election
Mike Thompson
Democratic
Elected U.S. Representative
Mike Thompson
Democratic

The incumbent was Democrat Mike Thompson, who had represented the district since 2013 and was re-elected with 67.8% of the vote in 2022.

=== Candidates ===
Advanced to general

- John Munn (Republican), former Davis Joint Unified School District trustee and perennial candidate
- Mike Thompson (Democratic), incumbent U.S. representative

Eliminated in primary

- Andrew Engdahl (Democratic), tech sales account executive and candidate for this district in 2022
- Niket Patwardhan (no party preference), software engineer

=== Endorsements ===
Andrew Engdahl (D)

Political parties

- Green Party of Sonoma County
John Munn (R)

Local officials

- Carl DeMaio, former San Diego city councilor (2008–2012)

Organizations

- California College Republicans
- California ProLife Council
- California Rifle and Pistol Association
Mike Thompson (D)

U.S. representatives

- Gabby Giffords, U.S. representative from Arizona's 8th congressional district (2007–2012)

Political parties

- California Democratic Party
- Yolo County Democratic Party

Organizations

- California Young Democrats
- Equality California
- Everytown for Gun Safety Action Fund
- Giffords
- Humane Society Legislative Fund
- J Street PAC
- League of Conservation Voters
- Planned Parenthood Action Fund (post-primary)
- Santa Rosa Chamber of Commerce
- Sierra Club

Labor unions

- AFSCME California
- California Federation of Labor
- California Federation of Teachers
- California Teachers Association
- 3 IBEW locals (Note: 180, 340, and 1245)
- International Brotherhood of Teamsters Joint Council 7
- National Education Association
- National Union of Healthcare Workers
- North Bay Building Trades Council

=== Fundraising ===
Campaign finance reports as of February 14, 2024
Candidate	Raised	Spent	Cash on hand
Andrew Engdahl (D)	$1,587	$4,028	$666
Mike Thompson (D)	$1,215,934	$1,608,631	$1,235,136
John Munn (R)	$59,561 (Note: $51,000 of this total was self-funded by Munn.)	$52,560	$7,000
Niket Patwardhan (NPP)	$9,019 (Note: $8,740 of this total was self-funded by Patwardhan.)	$7,347	$1,671
Source: Federal Election Commission

=== Predictions ===
Source	Ranking	As of
The Cook Political Report	Solid D	February 2, 2023
Inside Elections	Solid D	March 10, 2023
Sabato's Crystal Ball	Safe D	February 23, 2023
Elections Daily	Safe D	February 5, 2024
CNalysis	Solid D	November 16, 2023

=== Results ===
Primary results by county: Thompson—70–80% Thompson—60–70% Thompson—50–60% Munn—40–50%

California's 4th congressional district, 2024
Primary election
Party	Candidate	Votes	%
Democratic	Mike Thompson (incumbent)	120,736	62.5
Republican	John Munn	58,787	30.5
Democratic	Andrew Engdahl	11,492	6.0
No party preference	Niket Patwardhan	2,116	1.1
Total votes		193,131	100.0
General election
Democratic	Mike Thompson (incumbent)	227,730	66.5
Republican	John Munn	114,950	33.5
Total votes		342,680	100.0
Democratic hold			

==== By county ====
County	Mike Thompson Democratic		John Munn Republican		Margin		Total votes cast
County	#	%	#	%	#	%	Total votes cast
Lake	13,970	53.18%	12,299	46.82%	1,671	6.36%	26,269
Napa	45,317	70.14%	19,294	29.86%	26,023	40.28%	64,611
Solano (part)	31,404	50.01%	31,394	49.99%	10	0.02%	62,798
Sonoma (part)	89,324	74.36%	30,793	25.64%	58,531	48.73%	120,117
Yolo (part)	47,715	69.27%	21,170	30.73%	26,545	38.54%	68,885
Totals	227,730	66.46%	114,950	33.54%	112,780	32.91%	342,680

== District 5 ==
2024 California's 5th congressional district election
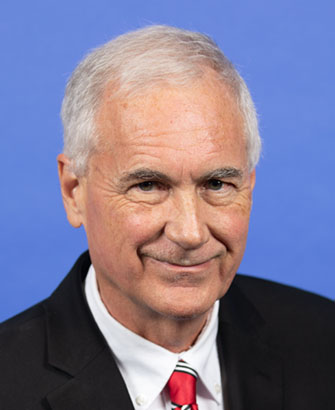

Candidate	Tom McClintock	Mike Barkley
Party	Republican	Democratic
Popular vote	227,643	140,919
Percentage	61.8%	38.2%
- County results McClintock: 50–60% 60–70%
U.S. Representative before election
Tom McClintock
Republican
Elected U.S. Representative
Tom McClintock
Republican

The incumbent was Republican Tom McClintock, who had represented the district since 2009 and was re-elected with 61.3% of the vote in 2022.

=== Candidates ===
Advanced to general

- Mike Barkley (Democratic), attorney, perennial candidate, and runner-up for this district in 2022
- Tom McClintock (Republican), incumbent U.S. representative

Eliminated in primary

- Steve Wozniak (no party preference), freelance writer and candidate for this district in 2022 (no relation to Apple cofounder Steve Wozniak)

=== Endorsements ===
Mike Barkley (D)

Political parties

- California Democratic Party

Organizations

- California Young Democrats

Labor unions

- California Federation of Labor
- IBEW Local 684
Tom McClintock (R)

State officials

- Mike Huckabee, governor of Arkansas (1996–2007)

Local officials

- Carl DeMaio, former San Diego city councilor (2008–2012)

Political parties

- American Independent Party
- California Republican Party

Organizations

- AIPAC
- California College Republicans
- California ProLife Council
- California Rifle and Pistol Association
- National Rifle Association Political Victory Fund

=== Fundraising ===
Campaign finance reports as of February 14, 2024
Candidate	Raised	Spent	Cash on hand
Tom McClintock (R)	$633,193	$638,946	$131,787
Mike Barkley (D)	$31,203 (Note: $21,729 of this total was self-funded by Barkley.)	$27,281	$4,000
Source: Federal Election Commission

=== Predictions ===
Source	Ranking	As of
The Cook Political Report	Solid R	February 2, 2023
Inside Elections	Solid R	March 10, 2023
Sabato's Crystal Ball	Safe R	February 23, 2023
Elections Daily	Safe R	February 5, 2024
CNalysis	Solid R	November 16, 2023

=== Results ===
Primary results by county: McClintock—60–70% McClintock—50–60%

California's 5th congressional district, 2024
Primary election
Party	Candidate	Votes	%
Republican	Tom McClintock (incumbent)	118,958	58.5
Democratic	Mike Barkley	66,680	32.8
No party preference	Steve Wozniak	17,636	8.7
Total votes		203,274	100.0
General election
Republican	Tom McClintock (incumbent)	227,643	61.8
Democratic	Mike Barkley	140,919	38.2
Total votes		368,562	100.0
Republican hold			

==== By county ====
County	Tom McClintock Republican		Mike Barkley Democratic		Margin		Total votes cast
County	#	%	#	%	#	%	Total votes cast
Amador	14,607	66.57%	7,336	33.43%	7,271	33.14%	21,943
Calaveras	17,051	66.06%	8,761	33.94%	8,290	32.12%	25,812
El Dorado (part)	46,898	61.90%	28,862	38.10%	18,036	23.81%	75,760
Fresno (part)	34,642	59.50%	23,578	40.50%	11,064	19.00%	58,220
Madera (part)	13,128	67.36%	6,362	32.64%	6,766	34.72%	19,490
Mariposa	5,786	62.49%	3,473	37.51%	2,313	24.98%	9,259
Stanislaus (part)	77,587	59.69%	52,390	40.31%	25,197	19.39%	129,977
Tuolumne	17,944	63.86%	10,157	36.14%	7,787	27.71%	28,101
Totals	227,643	61.77%	140,919	38.23%	86,724	23.53%	368,562

== District 6 ==
2024 California's 6th congressional district election
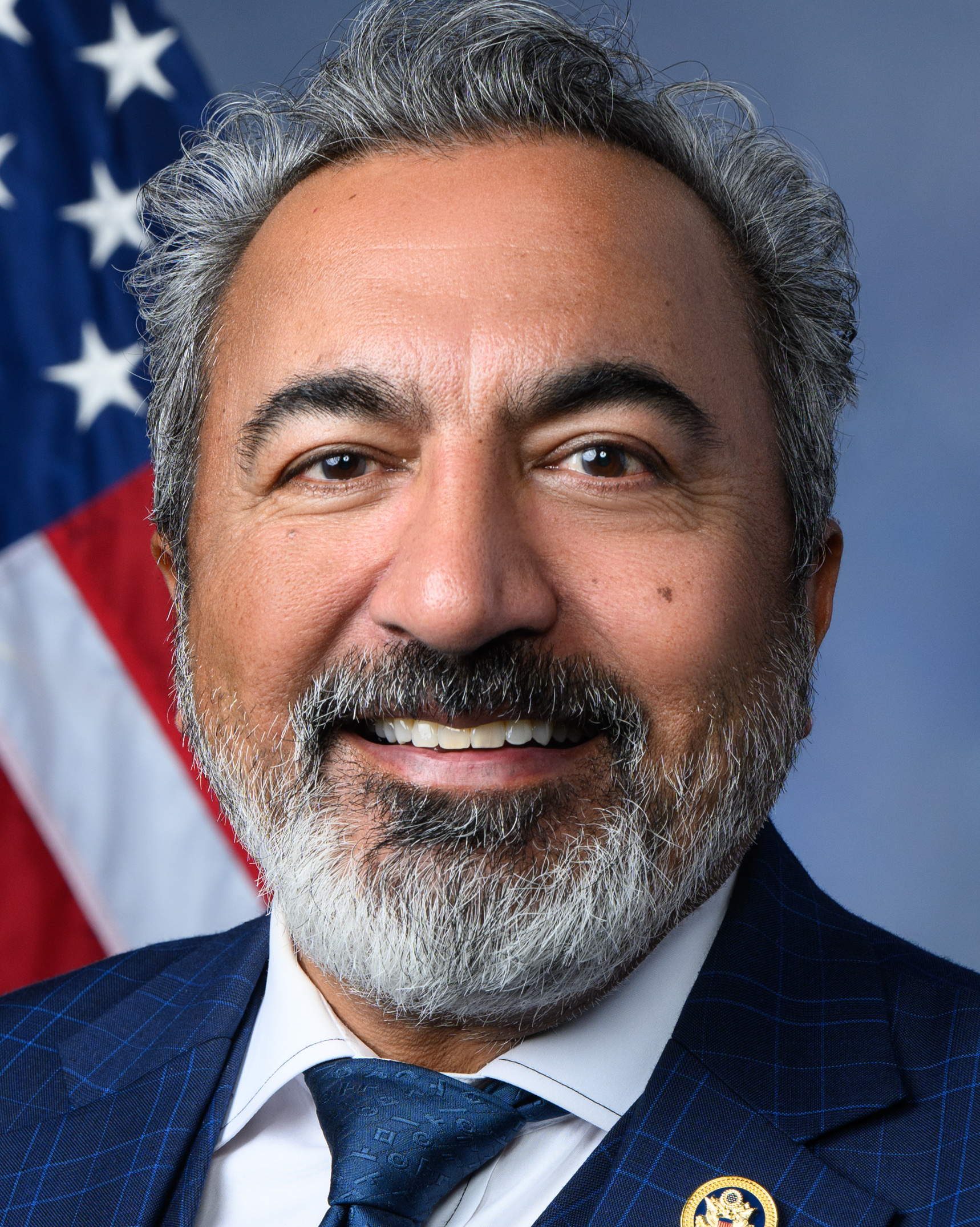

Candidate	Ami Bera	Christine Bish
Party	Democratic	Republican
Popular vote	165,408	121,664
Percentage	57.6%	42.4%
- Precinct results Bera: 50–60% 60–70% 70–80% 80–90% Bish: 50–60% 60–70% 70–80% >90% Tie No votes
U.S. Representative before election
Ami Bera
Democratic
Elected U.S. Representative
Ami Bera
Democratic

The incumbent was Democrat Ami Bera, who had represented the district since 2013 and was re-elected with 55.9% of the vote in 2022.

=== Candidates ===
Advanced to general

- Ami Bera (Democratic), incumbent U.S. representative
- Christine Bish (Republican), realtor, runner-up for this district in 2020 and candidate in 2022

Eliminated in primary

- Adam Barajas (Democratic), retail worker
- Craig DeLuz (Republican), Robla school board member
- Chris Richardson (Green), engineer and candidate for this district (Note: This district was numbered as the 7th district prior to the 2020 redistricting cycle.) in 2018, 2020, and 2022
- Ray Riehle (Republican), businessman

Withdrawn

- Bret Daniels (Republican), vice mayor of Citrus Heights and candidate for this district in 2022 (ran for Sacramento County Board of Supervisors)

=== Endorsements ===
Ami Bera (D)

Political parties

- California Democratic Party
- Sacramento County Democratic Party

Organizations

- AIPAC
- California Environmental Voters
- California Young Democrats
- Democratic Majority for Israel
- Equality California
- Humane Society Legislative Fund
- International Franchise Association
- J Street PAC
- Joint Action Committee for Political Affairs
- Planned Parenthood Action Fund
- Population Connection Action Fund

Labor unions

- AFSCME California
- California Federation of Labor
- California Federation of Teachers
- California Professional Firefighters
- California Teachers Association
- IBEW Locals 340 and 1245
- National Education Association

Newspapers

- The Sacramento Bee
Christine Bish (R)

Organizations

- California ProLife Council (co-endorsement with DeLuz)
- California Rifle and Pistol Association (co-endorsement with DeLuz)

Political parties

- American Independent Party
Craig DeLuz (R)

Local officials

- Carl DeMaio, former San Diego city councilor (2008–2012)

Organizations

- California College Republicans
- California ProLife Council (co-endorsement with Bish)
- California Republican Assembly
- California Rifle and Pistol Association (co-endorsement with Bish)

Political parties

- California Republican Party

=== Fundraising ===
Campaign finance reports as of February 14, 2024
Candidate	Raised	Spent	Cash on hand
Ami Bera (D)	$661,944	$611,725	$1,785,351
Christine Bish (R)	$83,838 (Note: $5,920 of this total was self-funded by Bish.)	$81,862	$2,004
Craig DeLuz (R)	$30,580 (Note: $5,000 of this total was self-funded by DeLuz.)	$29,008	$1,572
Ray Riehle (R)	$47,775 (Note: $22,400 of this total was self-funded by Riehle.)	$41,338	$6,436
Source: Federal Election Commission

=== Predictions ===
Source	Ranking	As of
The Cook Political Report	Solid D	February 2, 2023
Inside Elections	Solid D	March 10, 2023
Sabato's Crystal Ball	Safe D	February 23, 2023
Elections Daily	Safe D	February 5, 2024
CNalysis	Solid D	November 16, 2023

=== Results ===
Primary results by precinct: Bera—30–40% Bera—40–50% Bera—50–60% Bera—60–70% Bera—70–80% Bera—>90% Bish—30–40% Bish—80–90% Barajas—>90% Tie—50% No data

California's 6th congressional district, 2024
Primary election
Party	Candidate	Votes	%
Democratic	Ami Bera (incumbent)	76,605	51.8
Republican	Christine Bish	29,628	20.1
Republican	Ray Riehle	15,779	10.7
Republican	Craig DeLuz	14,361	9.7
Democratic	Adam Barajas	8,711	5.9
Green	Chris Richardson	2,661	1.8
Total votes		147,745	100.0
General election
Democratic	Ami Bera (incumbent)	165,408	57.6
Republican	Christine Bish	121,664	42.4
Total votes		287,072	100.0
Democratic hold			

== District 7 ==
2024 California's 7th congressional district election
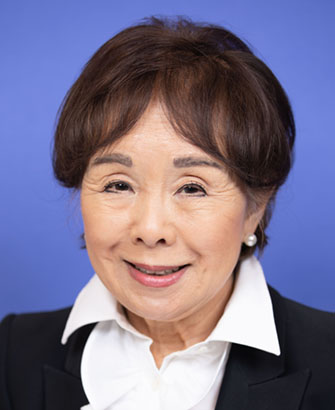

Candidate	Doris Matsui	Tom Silva
Party	Democratic	Republican
Popular vote	197,429	98,341
Percentage	66.8%	33.2%
- County results Matsui: 60–70%
U.S. Representative before election
Doris Matsui
Democratic
Elected U.S. Representative
Doris Matsui
Democratic

The incumbent was Democrat Doris Matsui, who had represented the district since 2013 and was re-elected with 68.3% of the vote in 2022.

=== Candidates ===
Advanced to general

- Doris Matsui (Democratic), incumbent U.S. representative
- Tom Silva (Republican), former Galt Joint Union Elementary School District trustee

Eliminated in primary

- David Mandel (Democratic), attorney

=== Endorsements ===
Doris Matsui (D)

Political parties

- California Democratic Party
- Sacramento County Democratic Party
- Yolo County Democratic Party

Organizations

- AIPAC
- California Environmental Voters
- California Young Democrats
- Equality California
- Feminist Majority PAC
- Humane Society Legislative Fund
- National Women's Political Caucus
- Planned Parenthood Action Fund (post-primary)
- Population Connection Action Fund

Labor unions

- AFSCME California
- California Federation of Labor
- California Federation of Teachers
- California Professional Firefighters
- California Teachers Association
- IBEW Locals 340 and 1245
- International Brotherhood of Teamsters Joint Council 7
- National Education Association
- National Union of Healthcare Workers

Newspapers

- The Sacramento Bee
Tom Silva (R)

Local officials

- Carl DeMaio, former San Diego city councilor (2008–2012)

Organizations

- California College Republicans
- California ProLife Council
- California Rifle and Pistol Association (post-primary)

Political parties

- California Republican Party

=== Fundraising ===
Campaign finance reports as of February 14, 2024
Candidate	Raised	Spent	Cash on hand
David Mandel (D)	$72,240	$49,283	$13,517
Doris Matsui (D)	$638,291	$637,713	$181,918
Tom Silva (R)	$4,500 (Note: $4,000 of this total was self-funded by Silva.)	$1,662	$2,837
Source: Federal Election Commission

=== Predictions ===
Source	Ranking	As of
The Cook Political Report	Solid D	February 2, 2023
Inside Elections	Solid D	March 10, 2023
Sabato's Crystal Ball	Safe D	February 23, 2023
Elections Daily	Safe D	February 5, 2024
CNalysis	Solid D	November 16, 2023

=== Results ===
California's 7th congressional district, 2024
Primary election
Party	Candidate	Votes	%
Democratic	Doris Matsui (incumbent)	89,485	56.5
Republican	Tom Silva	48,943	30.9
Democratic	David Mandel	20,057	12.7
Total votes		158,485	100.0
General election
Democratic	Doris Matsui (incumbent)	197,429	66.8
Republican	Tom Silva	98,341	33.2
Total votes		295,770	100.0
Democratic hold			

==== By county ====
County	Doris Matsui Democratic		Tom Silva Republican		Margin		Total votes cast
County	#	%	#	%	#	%	Total votes cast
Sacramento (part)	183,642	67.01%	90,406	32.99%	93,236	34.02%	274,048
Solano (part)	28	60.87%	18	39.13%	10	21.74%	46
Yolo (part)	13,759	63.48%	7,917	36.52%	5,842	26.95%	21,676
Totals	197,429	66.75%	98,341	33.25%	99,088	33.50%	295,770

== District 8 ==
2024 California's 8th congressional district election
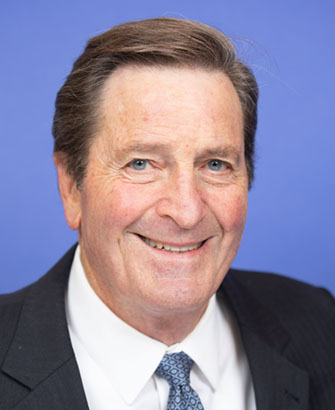

Candidate	John Garamendi	Rudy Recile
Party	Democratic	Republican
Popular vote	201,962	71,068
Percentage	74.0%	26.0%
- County results Garamendi: 60–70% 70–80%
U.S. Representative before election
John Garamendi
Democratic
Elected U.S. Representative
John Garamendi
Democratic

The incumbent was Democrat John Garamendi, who had represented the district since 2013 and was re-elected with 75.7% of the vote in 2022.

=== Candidate ===
Advanced to general

- John Garamendi (Democratic), incumbent U.S. representative
- Rudy Recile (Republican), consultant and runner-up for this district in 2022

=== Endorsements ===
John Garamendi (D)

Political parties

- California Democratic Party

Organizations

- California Environmental Voters
- California Young Democrats
- Council for a Livable World
- East Bay Young Democrats
- Equality California
- Feminist Majority PAC
- Humane Society Legislative Fund
- J Street PAC
- Planned Parenthood Action Fund (post-primary)

Labor unions

- AFSCME California
- California Federation of Labor
- California Federation of Teachers
- California Professional Firefighters
- California Teachers Association
- Contra Costa Building Trades Council
- 4 IBEW locals
- International Brotherhood of Teamsters Joint Council 7
Rudy Recile (R)
- National Education Association
- National Union of Healthcare Workers
- Service Employees International Union California, Local 1021, and SEIU United Healthcare Workers West

Local officials

- Carl DeMaio, former San Diego city councilor (2008–2012)

Organizations

- California College Republicans
- California ProLife Council

Political parties

- American Independent Party

=== Fundraising ===
Campaign finance reports as of February 14, 2024
Candidate	Raised	Spent	Cash on hand
John Garamendi (D)	$542,502	$488,936	$1,175,013
Rudy Recile (R)	$10,852 (Note: $1,214 of this total was self-funded by Recile.)	$10,496	$850
Source: Federal Election Commission

=== Predictions ===
Source	Ranking	As of
The Cook Political Report	Solid D	February 2, 2023
Inside Elections	Solid D	March 10, 2023
Sabato's Crystal Ball	Safe D	February 23, 2023
Elections Daily	Safe D	February 5, 2024
CNalysis	Solid D	November 16, 2023

=== Results ===
California's 8th congressional district, 2024
Primary election
Party	Candidate	Votes	%
Democratic	John Garamendi (incumbent)	100,193	77.0
Republican	Rudy Recile	29,944	23.0
Total votes		130,137	100.0
General election
Democratic	John Garamendi (incumbent)	201,962	74.0
Republican	Rudy Recile	71,068	26.0
Total votes		273,030	100.0
Democratic hold			

==== By county ====
County	John Garamendi Democratic		Rudy Recile Republican		Margin		Total votes cast
County	#	%	#	%	#	%	Total votes cast
Contra Costa (part)	117,827	78.03%	33,182	21.97%	84,645	56.05%	151,009
Solano (part)	84,135	68.95%	37,886	31.05%	46,249	37.90%	122,021
Totals	201,962	73.97%	71,068	26.03%	130,894	47.94%	273,030

== District 9 ==
2024 California's 9th congressional district election
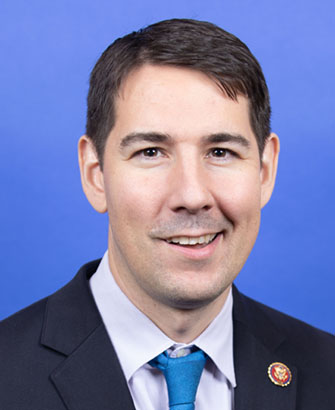

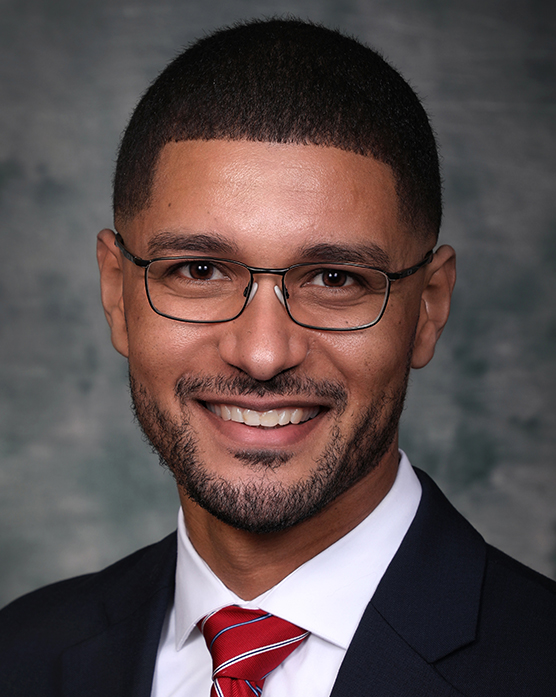
Candidate	Josh Harder	Kevin Lincoln
Party	Democratic	Republican
Popular vote	130,183	121,174
Percentage	51.8%	48.2%
- County results Harder: 50–60% Lincoln: 50–60% 70–80%
U.S. Representative before election
Josh Harder
Democratic
Elected U.S. Representative
Josh Harder
Democratic

The incumbent was Democrat Josh Harder, who had represented the district since 2019 and was re-elected with 54.9% of the vote in 2022.

=== Candidates ===
Advanced to general

- Josh Harder (Democratic), incumbent U.S. representative
- Kevin Lincoln (Republican), mayor of Stockton (2021–present)

Eliminated in primary

- Khalid Jafri (Republican), retired engineer and Democratic candidate for this district in 2022
- John McBride (Republican), strength and conditioning coach

Withdrawn

- Brett Dood (Republican), pastor (endorsed Lincoln)

=== Endorsements ===
Josh Harder (D)

Political parties

- California Democratic Party

Organizations

- AIPAC
- Bend the Arc
- California Environmental Voters
- California Young Democrats
- Council for a Livable World
- End Citizens United
- Equality California
- Everytown for Gun Safety Action Fund
- Feminist Majority PAC
- Humane Society Legislative Fund
- J Street PAC
- Joint Action Committee for Political Affairs
- Planned Parenthood Action Fund
- Population Connection Action Fund
- Sierra Club

Labor unions

- AFSCME California
- California Federation of Labor
- California Federation of Teachers
- California Professional Firefighters
- International Brotherhood of Teamsters Joint Council 7
- National Union of Healthcare Workers
- San Joaquin Building Trades Council
- SEIU Local 1021
- SEIU United Healthcare Workers West
- Service Employees International Union California
- United Auto Workers
Kevin Lincoln (R)

Local officials

- Carl DeMaio, former San Diego city councilor (2008–2012)

Organizations

- California College Republicans
- California Republican Assembly
- California Rifle and Pistol Association (post-primary)
- Congressional Leadership Fund (post-primary)
- National Republican Congressional Committee

Political parties

- California Republican Party
John McBride (R)

Organizations

- California ProLife Council
- California Rifle and Pistol Association (switched endorsement to Lincoln post-primary)

Political parties

- American Independent Party

=== Fundraising ===
Campaign finance reports as of February 14, 2024
Candidate	Raised	Spent	Cash on hand
Josh Harder (D)	$2,402,615	$767,804	$2,784,412
Kevin Lincoln (R)	$648,712	$424,366	$224,346
John McBride (R)	$11,315	$10,965	$349
Source: Federal Election Commission

=== Predictions ===
Source	Ranking	As of
The Cook Political Report	Likely D	February 2, 2023
Inside Elections	Likely D	June 20, 2024
Sabato's Crystal Ball	Likely D	February 23, 2023
Elections Daily	Lean D	March 22, 2024
CNalysis	Solid D	November 16, 2023

=== Polling ===
Poll source	Date(s) administered	Sample size (Note: Key: A – all adults RV – registered voters LV – likely voters V – unclear)	Margin of error	Josh Harder (D)	Kevin Lincoln (R)	Undecided
NMB Research (R) (Note: Archived March 12, 2024, at the Wayback Machine) (Note: Poll sponsored by the NRCC)	February 18–20, 2024	400 (LV)	± 2.0%	40%	44%	16%

=== Results ===
California's 9th congressional district, 2024
Primary election
Party	Candidate	Votes	%
Democratic	Josh Harder (incumbent)	60,978	49.7
Republican	Kevin Lincoln	36,744	30.0
Republican	John McBride	15,707	12.8
Republican	Khalid Jafri	9,150	7.5
Total votes		122,579	100.0
General election
Democratic	Josh Harder (incumbent)	130,183	51.8
Republican	Kevin Lincoln	121,174	48.2
Total votes		251,357	100.0
Democratic hold			

==== By county ====
County	Josh Harder Democratic		Kevin Lincoln Republican		Margin		Total votes cast
County	#	%	#	%	#	%	Total votes cast
Contra Costa (part)	3,809	43.26%	4,995	56.74%	−1,186	−13.47%	8,804
San Joaquin (part)	126,146	52.20%	115,515	47.80%	10,631	4.40%	241,661
Stanislaus (part)	228	25.56%	664	74.44%	−436	−48.88%	892
Totals	130,183	51.79%	121,174	48.21%	9,009	3.58%	251,357

== District 10 ==
2024 California's 10th congressional district election
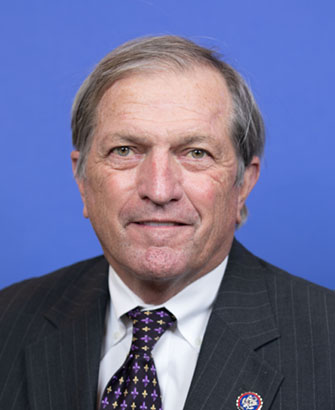

Candidate	Mark DeSaulnier	Katherine Piccinini
Party	Democratic	Republican
Popular vote	242,325	122,219
Percentage	66.5%	33.5%
- County results DeSaulnier: 60–70%
U.S. Representative before election
Mark DeSaulnier
Democratic
Elected U.S. Representative
Mark DeSaulnier
Democratic

The incumbent was Democrat Mark DeSaulnier, who had represented the district since 2015 and was re-elected with 78.9% of the vote in 2022.

=== Candidates ===
Advanced to general

- Mark DeSaulnier (Democratic), incumbent U.S. representative
- Katherine Piccinini (Republican), property manager and write-in candidate for this district in 2022

Eliminated in primary

- Nolan Chen (Republican), systems engineer
- Mohamed Elsherbini (no party preference), travel agency owner
- Joe Sweeney (no party preference), businessman

=== Endorsements ===
Mark DeSaulnier (D)

Political parties

- California Democratic Party

Organizations

- California Environmental Voters
- California Young Democrats
- Equality California
- Humane Society Legislative Fund
- J Street PAC
- Planned Parenthood Action Fund (post-primary)

Labor unions

- AFSCME California
- Alameda County Building Trades Council
- California Federation of Labor
- California Federation of Teachers
- California Professional Firefighters
- California Teachers Association
- Contra Costa Building Trades Council
- 3 IBEW locals (Note: 302, 595, and 1245)
- International Brotherhood of Teamsters Joint Council 7
- National Education Association
- National Union of Healthcare Workers
- United Auto Workers
Katherine Piccinini (R)

Local officials

- Carl DeMaio, former San Diego city councilor (2008–2012)

Organizations

- California ProLife Council

Political parties

- American Independent Party

=== Fundraising ===
Campaign finance reports as of February 14, 2024
Candidate	Raised	Spent	Cash on hand
Mark DeSaulnier (D)	$321,343	$271,401	$625,306
Nolan Chen (R)	$5,760 (Note: $4,640 of this total was self-funded by Chen.)	$3,274	$2,485
Katherine Piccinini (R)	$11,426 (Note: $1,812 of this total was self-funded by Piccinini.)	$9,708	$1,717
Joe Sweeney (I)	$14,285	$1,827	$12,457
Source: Federal Election Commission

=== Predictions ===
Source	Ranking	As of
The Cook Political Report	Solid D	February 2, 2023
Inside Elections	Solid D	March 10, 2023
Sabato's Crystal Ball	Safe D	February 23, 2023
Elections Daily	Safe D	February 5, 2024
CNalysis	Solid D	November 16, 2023

=== Results ===
California's 10th congressional district, 2024
Primary election
Party	Candidate	Votes	%
Democratic	Mark DeSaulnier (incumbent)	121,334	65.5
Republican	Katherine Piccinini	34,900	18.9
Republican	Nolan Chen	19,465	10.5
No party preference	Joe Sweeney	7,609	4.1
No party preference	Mohamed Elsherbini	1,825	1.0
Total votes		185,133	100.0
General election
Democratic	Mark DeSaulnier (incumbent)	242,325	66.5
Republican	Katherine Piccinini	122,219	33.5
Total votes		364,544	100.0
Democratic hold			

==== By county ====
County	Mark DeSaulnier Democratic		Katherine Piccinini Republican		Margin		Total votes cast
County	#	%	#	%	#	%	Total votes cast
Alameda (part)	12,354	67.37%	5,983	32.63%	6,371	34.74%	18,337
Contra Costa (part)	229,971	66.43%	116,236	33.57%	113,735	32.85%	346,207
Totals	242,325	66.47%	122,219	33.53%	120,106	32.95%	364,544

== District 11 ==
2024 California's 11th congressional district election
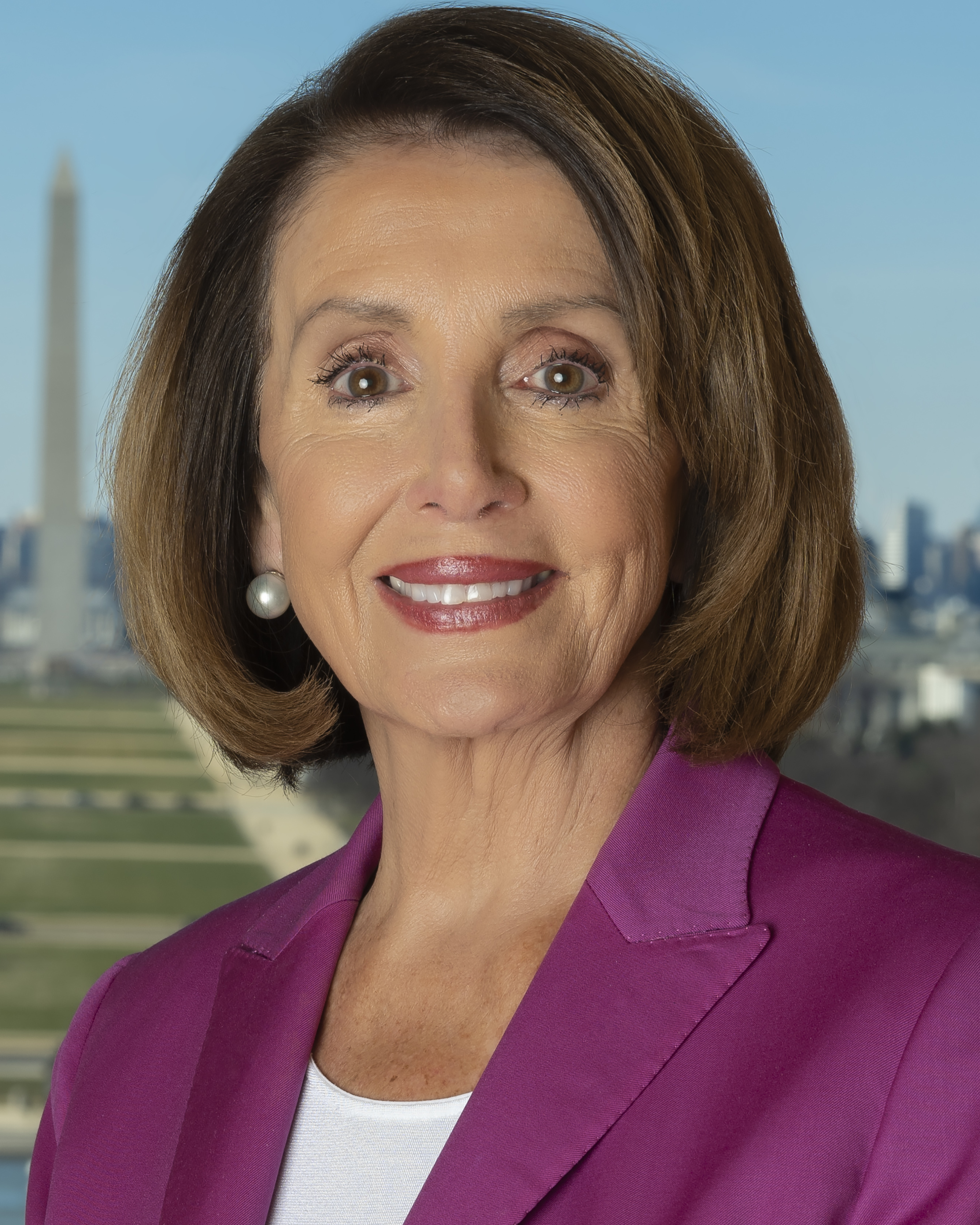

Candidate	Nancy Pelosi	Bruce Lou
Party	Democratic	Republican
Popular vote	274,796	64,315
Percentage	81.0%	19.0%
- County results Pelosi: 80–90%
U.S. Representative before election
Nancy Pelosi
Democratic
Elected U.S. Representative
Nancy Pelosi
Democratic

The incumbent was Democrat Nancy Pelosi, who was re-elected with 84.0% of the vote in 2022. Later that year, Pelosi announced she would step down from House leadership. Pelosi announced that she would seek re-election in 2024.

=== Candidates ===
Advanced to general

- Bruce Lou (Republican), business owner
- Nancy Pelosi (Democratic), incumbent U.S. representative and former Speaker of the House

Eliminated in primary

- Jason Boyce (Democratic), software engineer
- Eve Del Castello (Republican), business consultant and candidate for this district in 2022
- Marjorie Mikels (Democratic), attorney
- Larry Nichelson (Republican), retired teacher
- Bianca Von Krieg (Democratic), actress and candidate for this district in 2022
- Jason Zeng (Republican), data engineer

=== Endorsements ===
Bianca Von Krieg (D)

Organizations

- Vote Common Good
Bruce Lou (R)

Officials

- Carl DeMaio, former San Diego city councilor (2008–2012)

Organizations

- California College Republicans
- California Republican Assembly
- California Rifle and Pistol Association (post-primary)

Political parties

- American Independent Party
- California Republican Party
Nancy Pelosi (D)

Political parties

- California Democratic Party

Organizations

- AIPAC
- California Environmental Voters
- California Young Democrats
- Democratic Majority for Israel
- Equality California
- Everytown for Gun Safety Action Fund
- Feminist Majority PAC
- Harvey Milk LGBTQ Democratic Club
- Humane Society Legislative Fund
- J Street PAC
- Joint Action Committee for Political Affairs
- League of Conservation Voters
- Natural Resources Defense Council
- Planned Parenthood Action Fund
- Population Connection Action Fund
- Pro-Israel America
- Sierra Club

Labor unions

- AFSCME California
- California Federation of Labor
- California Federation of Teachers
- California Professional Firefighters
- California Teachers Association
- IBEW Locals 6 and 1245
- International Brotherhood of Teamsters Joint Council 7
- National Education Association
- National Union of Healthcare Workers
- SEIU Local 1021

Newspapers

- San Francisco Chronicle

=== Fundraising ===
Campaign finance reports as of February 14, 2024
Candidate	Raised	Spent	Cash on hand
Marjorie Mikels (D)	$10,000 (Note: $10,000 of this total was self-funded by Mikels.)	$1,200	$8,000
Nancy Pelosi (D)	$5,027,157	$5,005,162	$3,615,723
Bruce Lou (R)	$51,519 (Note: $29,790 of this total was self-funded by Lou.)	$38,550	$12,968
Jason Zeng (R)	$39,286 (Note: $38,526 of this total was self-funded by Zeng.)	$5,863	$33,422
Source: Federal Election Commission

=== Predictions ===
Source	Ranking	As of
The Cook Political Report	Solid D	February 2, 2023
Inside Elections	Solid D	March 10, 2023
Sabato's Crystal Ball	Safe D	February 23, 2023
Elections Daily	Safe D	February 5, 2024
CNalysis	Solid D	November 16, 2023

=== Results ===
Primary results by precinct: Pelosi—40–50% Pelosi—50–60% Pelosi—60–70% Pelosi—70–80% Pelosi—80–90% No data

California's 11th congressional district, 2024
Primary election
Party	Candidate	Votes	%
Democratic	Nancy Pelosi (incumbent)	138,285	73.3
Republican	Bruce Lou	16,285	8.6
Democratic	Marjorie Mikels	9,363	5.0
Democratic	Bianca Von Krieg	7,634	4.0
Republican	Jason Zeng	6,607	3.5
Democratic	Jason Boyce	4,325	2.3
Republican	Larry Nichelson	3,482	1.8
Republican	Eve Del Castello	2,751	1.5
Total votes		188,732	100.0
General election
Democratic	Nancy Pelosi (incumbent)	274,796	81.0
Republican	Bruce Lou	64,315	19.0
Total votes		339,111	100.0
Democratic hold			

== District 12 ==
2024 California's 12th congressional district election
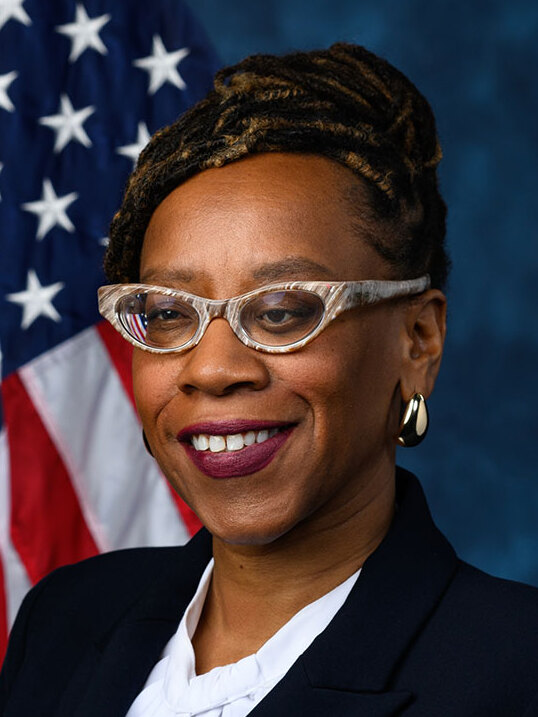

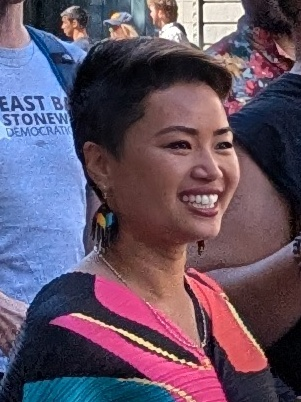
Candidate	Lateefah Simon	Jennifer Tran
Party	Democratic	Democratic
Popular vote	185,176	97,849
Percentage	65.4%	34.6%
Consolidated precinct results
Simon
50-55%
55-60%
60–65%
65–70%
70–75%
75–80%
>80%
Tran
50–55%
55–60%
60–65%
65–70%
70–80%
U.S. Representative before election
Barbara Lee
Democratic
Elected U.S. Representative
Lateefah Simon
Democratic

The incumbent was Democrat Barbara Lee, who was re-elected with 90.5% of the vote in 2022. She did not seek re-election, instead choosing to run for the U.S. Senate.

=== Candidates ===
Advanced to general

- Lateefah Simon (Democratic), president of the Bay Area Rapid Transit Board of Directors and California State University trustee
- Jennifer Tran (Democratic), California State University East Bay professor and president of the Oakland Vietnamese Chamber of Commerce

Eliminated in primary

- Tony Daysog (Democratic), vice mayor of Alameda and candidate for the 10th district (Note: Numbered as the 11th district prior to the 2020 redistricting cycle) in 2014
- Glenn Kaplan (Democratic), bar owner and candidate for this district in 2022
- Ned Nuerge (Republican), retired driving instructor, LaRouchite, and candidate for this district in 2022
- Abdur Sikder (Democratic), San Francisco State University professor
- Stephen Slauson (Republican), electrical engineer and runner-up for this district in 2022
- Andre Todd (Democratic), financial executive and former National Football League player
- Eric Wilson (Democratic), nonprofit employee and candidate for this district in 2022

Withdrawn

- Tim Sanchez (Democratic), Boeing executive

Declined

- Nikki Fortunato Bas (Democratic), president of the Oakland City Council
- Mia Bonta (Democratic), state assemblywoman from the 18th district (2021–present) (endorsed Simon)
- Dan Kalb (Democratic), Oakland city councilor from the 1st district (2013–present) (ran for state senate)
- Barbara Lee (Democratic), incumbent U.S. representative (ran for U.S. Senate)
- Libby Schaaf (Democratic), former mayor of Oakland (2015–2023) (endorsed Simon)
- Buffy Wicks (Democratic), state assemblywoman from the 14th district (2019–present) (endorsed Simon)

=== Endorsements ===
Ned Nuerge (R)

Political parties

- American Independent Party
Lateefah Simon (D)

U.S. representatives

- Robert Garcia, U.S. representative from CA-42 (2023–present)
- Kevin Mullin, U.S. representative from CA-15 (2023–present)

Statewide officials

- Rob Bonta, California Attorney General (2021–present)
- Gavin Newsom, governor of California (2019–present)

State legislators

- Mia Bonta, state assemblywoman from the 18th district (2021–present)
- Nancy Skinner, state senator from the 9th district (2016–present)
- Buffy Wicks, state assemblywoman from the 14th district (2019–present)

Local officials

- Libby Schaaf, former mayor of Oakland (2015–2023)

Political parties

- California Democratic Party

Organizations

- Black Women Organized for Political Action
- California Environmental Voters
- California Working Families Party
- California Young Democrats
- Center for Biological Diversity Action Fund
- Congressional Progressive Caucus PAC
- Courage California
- East Bay Stonewall Democratic Club
- East Bay Young Democrats
- Emgage PAC
- EMILY's List
- End Citizens United
- Feminist Majority PAC
- Friends of the Earth Action
- League of Conservation Voters
- Planned Parenthood Action Fund
- Reproductive Freedom for All
- Sierra Club

Labor unions

- Actors' Equity Association
- AFSCME California
- Alameda County Building and Construction Trades Council
- California Federation of Labor
- California Federation of Teachers
- California Professional Firefighters
- California Teachers Association
- IBEW Locals 595 and 1245
- International Brotherhood of Teamsters Joint Council 7
- National Education Association
- National Nurses United
- National Union of Healthcare Workers
- SEIU Local 1021
- SEIU United Healthcare Workers West
- Service Employees International Union California
- United Auto Workers

Newspapers

- Bay Area Reporter
- East Bay Times
- The Mercury News
- San Francisco Chronicle
Stephen Slauson (R)

Local officials

- Carl DeMaio, former San Diego city councilor (2008–2012)
Jennifer Tran (D)

U.S. representatives

- Grace Meng, U.S. representative from NY-6 (2013–present)

Organizations

- ASPIRE PAC
- ~~LPAC~~ (rescinded)
Tim Sanchez (D) (withdrawn)

U.S. representatives

- Lou Correa, U.S. representative from CA-46 (2017–present)
- Andrea Salinas, U.S. representative from OR-06 (2023–present)
- Linda Sánchez, U.S. representative from CA-38 (2003–present) (no relation)

Organizations

- CHC BOLD PAC
- VoteVets

=== Fundraising ===
Campaign finance reports as of February 14, 2024
Candidate	Raised	Spent	Cash on hand
Tony Daysog (D) (Note: Did not file for pre-primary deadline)	$18,760	$18,298	$461
Abdur Sikder (D)	$21,938	$18,366	$3,571
Lateefah Simon (D)	$1,110,109	$836,790	$273,318
Jennifer Tran (D)	$148,095	$97,686	$50,408
Source: Federal Election Commission

=== Predictions ===
Source	Ranking	As of
The Cook Political Report	Solid D	February 2, 2023
Inside Elections	Solid D	March 10, 2023
Sabato's Crystal Ball	Safe D	February 23, 2023
Elections Daily	Safe D	February 5, 2024
CNalysis	Solid D	November 16, 2023

=== Polling ===
Poll source	Date(s) administered	Sample size	Margin of error	Lateefah Simon (D)	Jennifer Tran (D)	Other	Undecided
USC/CSU	September 14–21, 2024	510 (LV)	± 4.3%	41%	27%	3% (Note: "Won't vote" with 3%)	32%

=== Results ===
California's 12th congressional district, 2024
Primary election
Party	Candidate	Votes	%
Democratic	Lateefah Simon	86,031	55.9
Democratic	Jennifer Tran	22,999	14.9
Democratic	Tony Daysog	17,222	11.2
Republican	Stephen Slauson	9,710	6.3
Democratic	Glenn Kaplan	6,799	4.4
Democratic	Eric Wilson	4,252	2.8
Democratic	Abdur Sikder	2,857	1.9
Republican	Ned Nuerge	2,535	1.6
Democratic	Andre Todd	1,632	1.1
Total votes		154,037	100.0
General election
Democratic	Lateefah Simon	185,176	65.4
Democratic	Jennifer Tran	97,849	34.6
Total votes		283,025	100.0
Democratic hold			

== District 13 ==
2024 California's 13th congressional district election
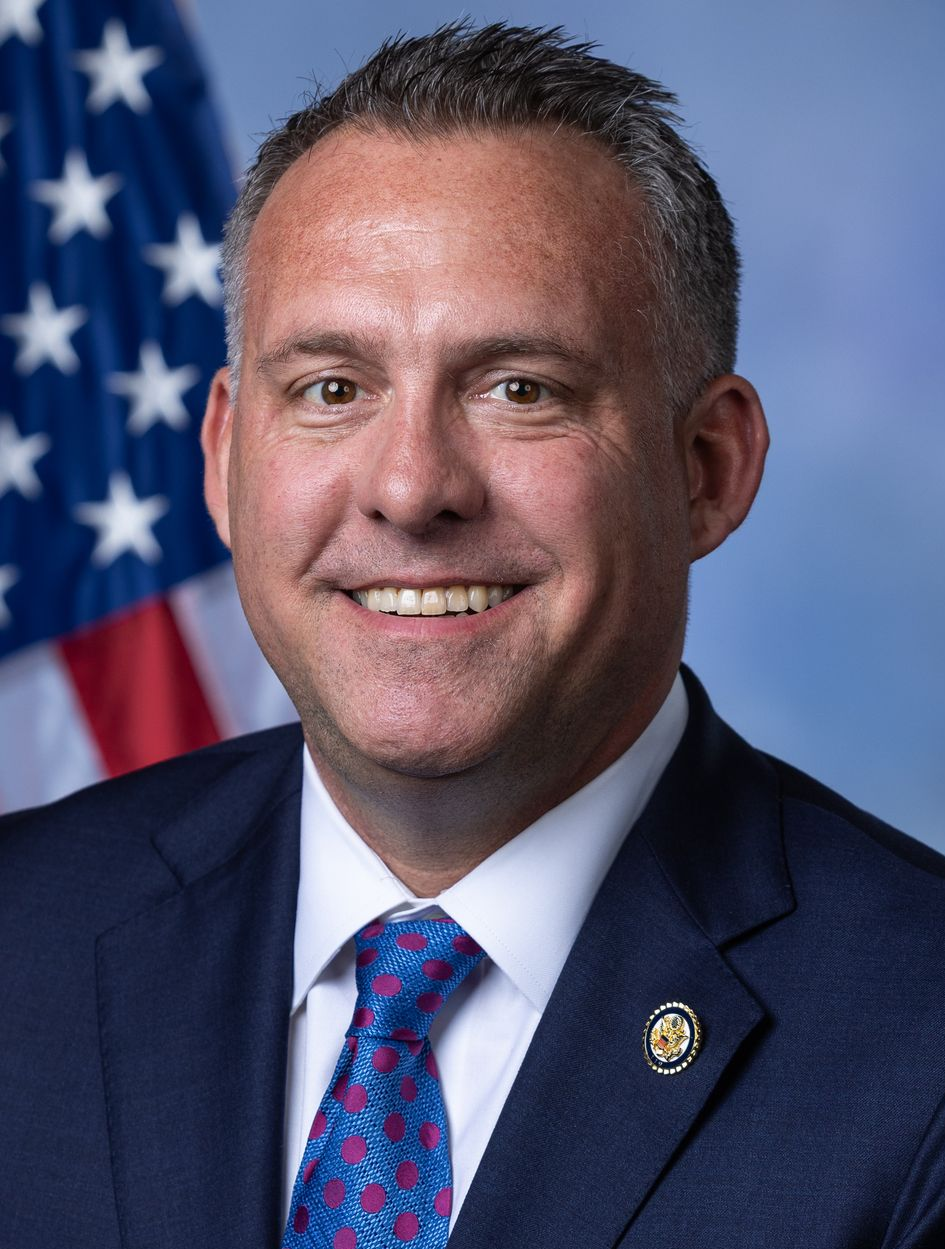

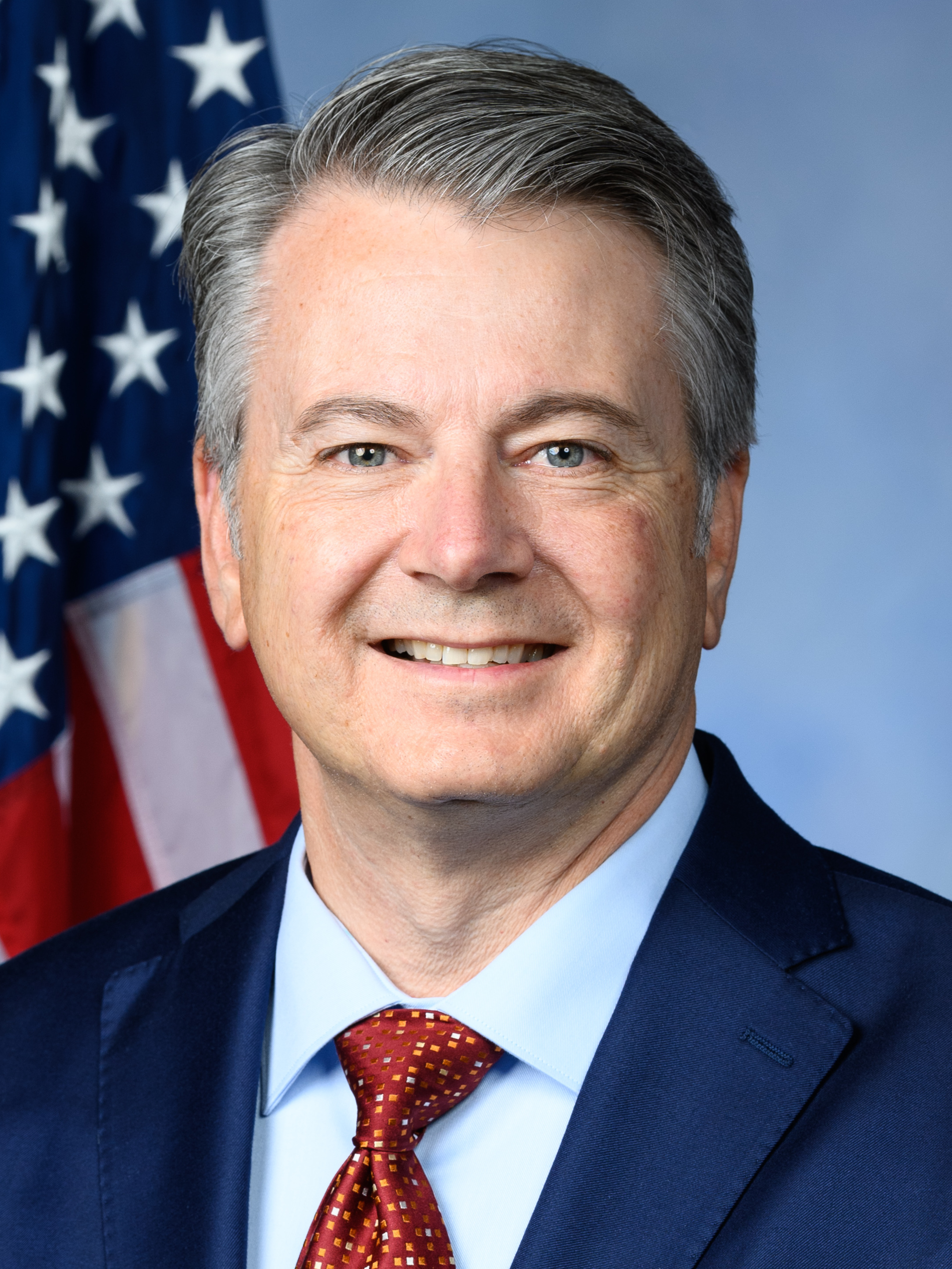
Candidate	Adam Gray	John Duarte
Party	Democratic	Republican
Popular vote	105,554	105,367
Percentage	50.04%	49.96%
- County results Gray: 50–60% Duarte: 50–60%
U.S. Representative before election
John Duarte
Republican
Elected U.S. Representative
Adam Gray
Democratic

The incumbent was Republican John Duarte, who flipped the district and was elected with 50.2% of the vote in 2022. This was a rematch between the candidates from 2022 where Duarte previously defeated Gray by a slim margin. This was the closest House race in 2024 and one of the last to be called due to the close margin, California's state law allowing ballots to arrive a week after the election, and a high quantity of absentee votes which must be cured.

Ceres Courier erroneously declared Duarte the winner on November 13 claiming high confidence that the remaining vote total wouldn't allow Gray to overtake Duarte's lead of roughly 3,000 votes. Most networks declared Gray the winner in early December.

Republican Donald Trump carried the district by 5.4% in the concurrent presidential election.

=== Candidates ===
Advanced to general

- John Duarte (Republican), incumbent U.S. representative
- Adam Gray (Democratic), former state assemblyman from the 21st district (2012–2022) and runner-up for this district in 2022

=== Endorsements ===
John Duarte (R)

State officials

- Mike Huckabee, governor of Arkansas (1996–2007)

Local officials

- Carl DeMaio, former San Diego city councilor (2008–2012)

Political parties

- California Republican Party

Organizations

- AIPAC
- California College Republicans
- California ProLife Council
- California Rifle and Pistol Association
- Howard Jarvis Taxpayers Association PAC
- National Rifle Association Political Victory Fund
- Republican Jewish Coalition
Adam Gray (D)

U.S. representatives

- Jim Costa, U.S. representative from CA-21 (Note: This district was numbered as the 20th district prior to the 2010 redistricting cycle, and as the 16th district from then until the 2020 redistricting cycle.) (2005–present)
- Annie Kuster, U.S. representative for New Hampshire's 2nd congressional district
- Pat Ryan, U.S. representative for New York's 18th congressional district

Political parties

- California Democratic Party

Organizations

- Blue Dog PAC
- California Young Democrats
- DCCC Red to Blue
- Equality California
- Feminist Majority PAC
- Jewish Democratic Council of America
- NewDem Action Fund
- Planned Parenthood Action Fund
- Swing Left

Labor unions

- AFSCME California
- California Federation of Labor
- California Teachers Association
- Fresno-Madera-Kings-Tulare Building Trades Council
- IBEW Locals 684 and 1245
- International Brotherhood of Teamsters Joint Council 7
- National Education Association

=== Fundraising ===
Campaign finance reports as of February 14, 2024
Candidate	Raised	Spent	Cash on hand
John Duarte (R)	$2,205,578	$743,978	$1,487,118
Adam Gray (D)	$786,855	$372,845	$468,384
Source: Federal Election Commission

=== Primary election ===
==== Polling ====
Poll source	Date(s) administered	Sample size	Margin of error	John Duarte (R)	Phil Arballo (D)	Adam Gray (D)	Other/Undecided
RMG Research (Note: Poll sponsored by U.S. Term Limits, whose term limits pledge Duarte has signed)	November 14–19, 2023	300 (LV)	± 5.7%	21%	2%	21%	55% (Note: "Someone else" with 7%; "Would not vote" with 1%)

=== General election ===
==== Debates ====
2024 California's 13th congressional district debates
No.	Date	Host	Moderator	Link	Republican	Democratic
Key: P Participant A Absent N Not invited I Invited W Withdrawn						
Key: P Participant A Absent N Not invited I Invited W Withdrawn					John Duarte	Adam Gray
1	Oct. 25, 2024	Central Valley Journalism Collaborative; KXJZ; The Maddy Institute; University of California, Merced	Kristin Lam; Victor Patton; Brianna Vaccari	YouTube	P	P
2	Oct. 31, 2024	KTXL	Brian Dorman; Nikki Laurenzo	KTXL	P	P

==== Predictions ====
Source	Ranking	As of
The Cook Political Report	Tossup	February 2, 2023
Inside Elections	Tilt D (flip)	October 18, 2024
Sabato's Crystal Ball	Lean D (flip)	November 4, 2024
Elections Daily	Lean D (flip)	November 4, 2024
CNalysis	Tilt D (flip)	November 4, 2024

==== Polling ====
Poll source	Date(s) administered	Sample size	Margin of error	John Duarte (R)	Adam Gray (D)	Undecided
USC/CSU	September 14–21, 2024	311 (LV)	± 5.6%	45%	46%	9% (Note: "Won't vote" with 3%)

=== Results ===
Primary results by county: Duarte—60–70% Duarte—50–60% Gray—50–60%

California's 13th congressional district, 2024
Primary election
Party	Candidate	Votes	%
Republican	John Duarte (incumbent)	47,219	54.9
Democratic	Adam Gray	38,754	45.1
Total votes		85,973	100.0
General election
Democratic	Adam Gray	105,554	50.04
Republican	John Duarte (incumbent)	105,367	49.96
Total votes		210,921	100.00
Democratic gain from Republican			

==== By county ====
County	John Duarte Republican		Adam Gray Democratic		Margin		Total votes cast
County	#	%	#	%	#	%	Total votes cast
Fresno (part)	11,440	55.96%	9,004	44.04%	−2,436	−11.92%	20,444
Madera (part)	19,187	57.11%	14,410	42.89%	−4,777	−14.22%	33,597
Merced	40,253	48.55%	42,652	51.45%	2,399	2.89%	82,905
San Joaquin (part)	6,995	46.45%	8,064	53.55%	1,069	7.10%	15,059
Stanislaus (part)	27,492	46.66%	31,424	53.34%	3,932	6.67%	58,916
Totals	105,367	49.96%	105,554	50.04%	187	0.09%	210,921

== District 14 ==
2024 California's 14th congressional district election
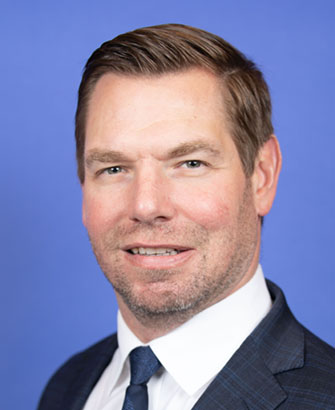

Candidate	Eric Swalwell	Vin Kruttiventi
Party	Democratic	Republican
Popular vote	187,263	89,125
Percentage	67.7%	32.3%
- County results Swalwell: 60–70%
U.S. Representative before election
Eric Swalwell
Democratic
Elected U.S. Representative
Eric Swalwell
Democratic

The incumbent was Democrat Eric Swalwell, who had represented the district since 2013 and was re-elected with 69.3% of the vote in 2022.

=== Candidates ===
Advanced to general

- Vin Kruttiventi (Republican), engineer
- Eric Swalwell (Democratic), incumbent U.S. representative

Eliminated in primary

- Alison Hayden (Republican), teacher and runner-up for this district (Note: Numbered as the 15th district prior to the 2020 redistricting cycle) in 2020 and 2022
- Luis Reynoso (Republican), Chabot–Las Positas Community College District trustee

=== Endorsements ===
Alison Hayden (R)

Political parties

- American Independent Party
Vin Kruttiventi (R)

Local officials

- Carl DeMaio, former San Diego city councilor (2008–2012)

Organizations

- California College Republicans
- California ProLife Council
- Howard Jarvis Taxpayers Association PAC

Political parties

- California Republican Party
Eric Swalwell (D)

Political parties

- California Democratic Party

Organizations

- AIPAC
- California Environmental Voters
- California Young Democrats
- Equality California
- Humane Society Legislative Fund
- J Street PAC
- Joint Action Committee for Political Affairs
- Planned Parenthood Action Fund (post-primary)

Labor unions

- AFSCME California
- Alameda County Building Trades Council
- California Federation of Labor
- California Federation of Teachers
- California Professional Firefighters
- California Teachers Association
- IBEW Locals 595 and 1245
- International Brotherhood of Teamsters Joint Council 7
- National Education Association
- National Union of Healthcare Workers

=== Fundraising ===
Campaign finance reports as of February 14, 2024
Candidate	Raised	Spent	Cash on hand
Eric Swalwell (D)	$2,658,863	$2,563,768	$723,694
Vin Kruttiventi (R)	$668,973 (Note: $500,000 of this total was self-funded by Kruttiventi.)	$399,455	$269,518
Source: Federal Election Commission

=== Predictions ===
Source	Ranking	As of
The Cook Political Report	Solid D	February 2, 2023
Inside Elections	Solid D	March 10, 2023
Sabato's Crystal Ball	Safe D	February 23, 2023
Elections Daily	Safe D	February 5, 2024
CNalysis	Solid D	November 16, 2023

=== Results ===
California's 14th congressional district, 2024
Primary election
Party	Candidate	Votes	%
Democratic	Eric Swalwell (incumbent)	84,075	66.7
Republican	Vin Kruttiventi	22,134	17.6
Republican	Alison Hayden	11,948	9.5
Republican	Luis Reynoso	7,812	6.2
Total votes		125,969	100.0
General election
Democratic	Eric Swalwell (incumbent)	187,263	67.8
Republican	Vin Kruttiventi	89,125	32.2
Total votes		276,388	100.0
Democratic hold			

== District 15 ==
2024 California's 15th congressional district election
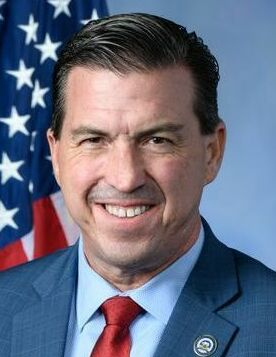

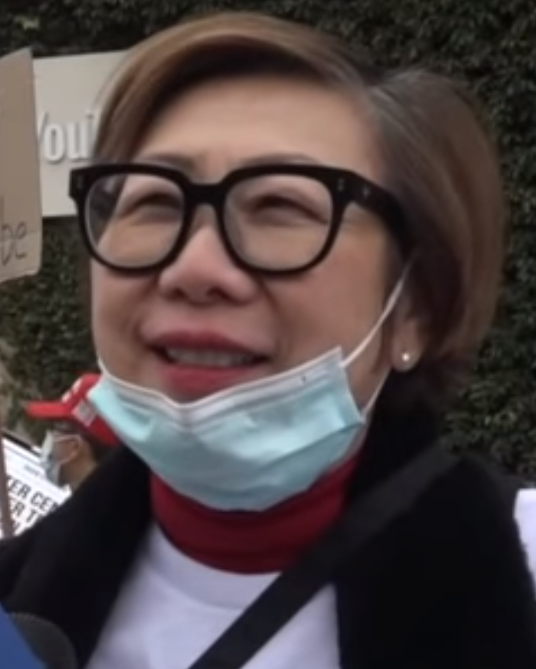
Candidate	Kevin Mullin	Anna Cheng Kramer
Party	Democratic	Republican
Popular vote	211,648	77,896
Percentage	73.1%	26.9%
- County results Mullin: 60–70% 70–80%
U.S. Representative before election
Kevin Mullin
Democratic
Elected U.S. Representative
Kevin Mullin
Democratic

The incumbent was Democrat Kevin Mullin, who had represented the district since 2023. He was elected with 55.5% of the vote in 2022, running against another Democrat.

=== Candidates ===
Advanced to general

- Anna Cheng Kramer (Republican), housing policy advisor
- Kevin Mullin (Democratic), incumbent U.S. representative

=== Endorsements ===
Anna Cheng Kramer (R)

Local officials

- Carl DeMaio, former San Diego city councilor (2008–2012)

Organizations

- California College Republicans
- California ProLife Council
- California Republican Assembly
- California Rifle and Pistol Association

Political parties

- American Independent Party
- California Republican Party
Kevin Mullin (D)

Political parties

- California Democratic Party

Organizations

- AIPAC
- California Environmental Voters
- Democratic Majority for Israel
- Equality California
- Harvey Milk LGBTQ Democratic Club
- Humane Society Legislative Fund
- Jewish Democratic Council of America (post-primary)
- League of Conservation Voters
- Planned Parenthood Action Fund (post-primary)
- Sierra Club

Labor unions

- AFSCME California
- Association of Flight Attendants
- California Federation of Labor
- California Federation of Teachers
- California Professional Firefighters
- California Teachers Association
- IBEW Locals 617 and 1245
- International Brotherhood of Teamsters Joint Council 7
- National Nurses United
- National Union of Healthcare Workers
- SEIU Local 1021
- SEIU United Healthcare Workers West

Newspapers

- San Francisco Bay View

=== Fundraising ===
Campaign finance reports as of February 14, 2024
Candidate	Raised	Spent	Cash on hand
Kevin Mullin (D)	$454,937 (Note: $50,000 of this total was self-funded by Mullin.)	$440,677	$36,794
Anna Kramer (R)	$39,080 (Note: $18,400 of this total was self-funded by Kramer.)	$12,651	$26,429
Source: Federal Election Commission

=== Predictions ===
Source	Ranking	As of
The Cook Political Report	Solid D	February 2, 2023
Inside Elections	Solid D	March 10, 2023
Sabato's Crystal Ball	Safe D	February 23, 2023
Elections Daily	Safe D	February 5, 2024
CNalysis	Solid D	November 16, 2023

=== Results ===
California's 15th congressional district, 2024
Primary election
Party	Candidate	Votes	%
Democratic	Kevin Mullin (incumbent)	109,172	75.3
Republican	Anna Cheng Kramer	35,868	24.7
Total votes		145,040	100.0
General election
Democratic	Kevin Mullin (incumbent)	211,648	73.1
Republican	Anna Cheng Kramer	77,896	26.9
Total votes		289,544	100.0
Democratic hold			

==== By county ====
County	Kevin Mullin Democratic		Anna Cheng Kramer Republican		Margin		Total votes cast
County	#	%	#	%	#	%	Total votes cast
San Francisco (part)	25,287	69.95%	10,863	30.05%	14,424	39.90%	36,150
San Mateo (part)	186,361	73.55%	67,033	26.45%	119,328	47.09%	253,394
Totals	211,648	73.10%	77,896	26.90%	133,752	46.19%	289,544

== District 16 ==
2024 California's 16th congressional district election
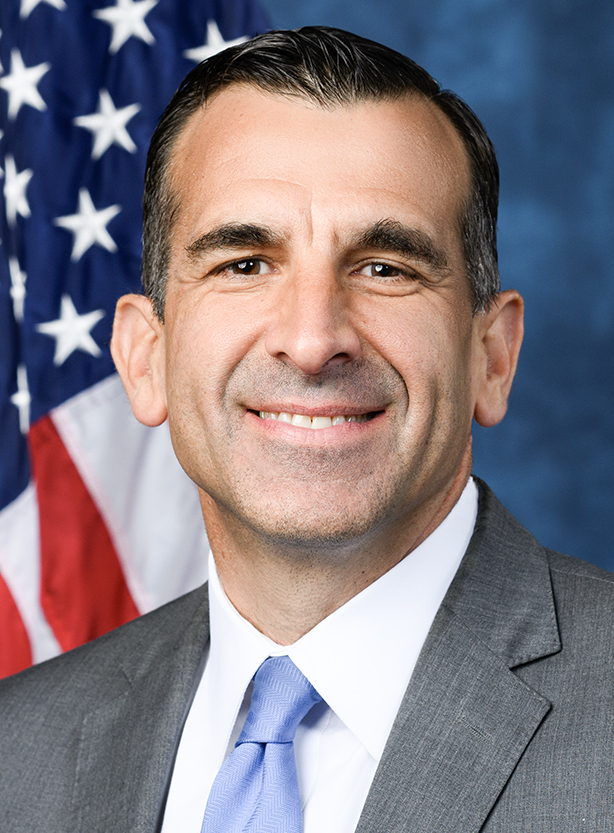

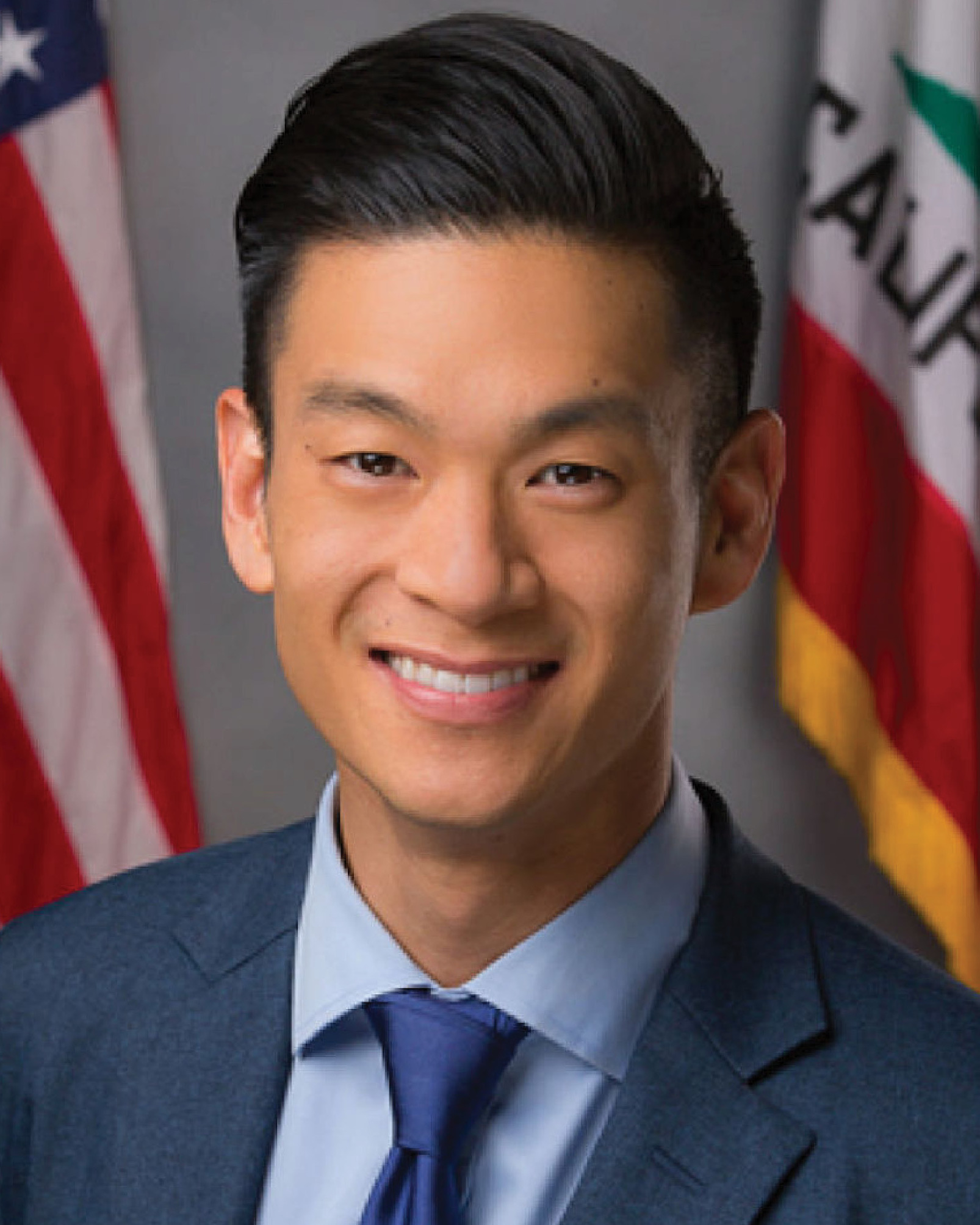
Candidate	Sam Liccardo	Evan Low
Party	Democratic	Democratic
Popular vote	179,583	128,893
Percentage	58.2%	41.8%
- County results Liccardo: 50–60% 60–70%
U.S. Representative before election
Anna Eshoo
Democratic
Elected U.S. Representative
Sam Liccardo
Democratic

The incumbent was Democrat Anna Eshoo, who was re-elected with 57.8% of the vote in 2022, running against another Democrat. She did not seek re-election. Former San Jose mayor Sam Liccardo advanced to the general election a week after the primary. His challenger was state assemblyman Evan Low.

By April 3, Low and Santa Clara County supervisor Joe Simitian were tied with 30,249 votes each, and were expected to advance to the general election under a stipulation by California elections code regarding a second-place tie in primary elections. However, a recount was requested by two voters shortly thereafter. The recount request was controversial, with Low's campaign accusing Liccardo of being behind it. At the conclusion of the recount on May 1, Low ultimately edged out Simitian by a margin of 5 votes, with Low gaining 12 votes and Simitian 7.

=== Candidates ===
Advanced to general

- Sam Liccardo (Democratic), former mayor of San Jose (2015–2023)
- Evan Low (Democratic), state assemblyman from the 26th district (2014–present)

Initially advanced to general but eliminated after recount

- Joe Simitian (Democratic), Santa Clara County supervisor from the 5th district (1996–2000, 2013–present) and former state senator from the 11th district (2004–2012)

Eliminated in primary

- Joby Bernstein (Democratic), financial advisor and graduate student
- Peter Dixon (Democratic), cybersecurity executive and former U.S. State Department staffer
- Rishi Kumar (Democratic), former Saratoga city councilor and runner-up for this district (Note: This district was numbered as the 18th district prior to the 2020 redistricting cycle.) in 2020 and 2022
- Julie Lythcott-Haims (Democratic), Palo Alto city councilor
- Ahmed Mostafa (Democratic), attorney
- Peter Ohtaki (Republican), former mayor of Menlo Park and candidate for this district in 2022
- Karl Ryan (Republican), businessman
- Greg Tanaka (Democratic), Palo Alto city councilor and candidate for this district in 2022

Declined

- Josh Becker (Democratic), state senator from the 13th district (2020–present)
- Marc Berman (Democratic), state assemblyman from the 23rd district (2016–present)
- Anna Eshoo (Democratic), incumbent U.S. representative (endorsed Simitian)

=== Predictions ===
Source	Ranking	As of
The Cook Political Report	Solid D	February 2, 2023
Inside Elections	Solid D	March 10, 2023
Sabato's Crystal Ball	Safe D	February 23, 2023
Elections Daily	Safe D	February 5, 2024
CNalysis	Solid D	November 16, 2023

=== Results ===
California's 16th congressional district, 2024 (results certified on April 4, 2024)
Primary election
Party	Candidate	Votes	%
Democratic	Sam Liccardo	38,489	21.1
Democratic	Evan Low	30,249	16.6
Democratic	Joe Simitian	30,249	16.6
Republican	Peter Ohtaki	23,275	12.8
Democratic	Peter Dixon	14,673	8.1
Democratic	Rishi Kumar	12,377	6.8
Republican	Karl Ryan	11,557	6.3
Democratic	Julie Lythcott-Haims	11,383	6.2
Democratic	Ahmed Mostafa	5,811	3.2
Democratic	Greg Tanaka	2,421	1.3
Democratic	Joby Bernstein	1,651	0.9
Total votes		182,135	100.0

2024 California's 16th congressional district primary (final recount results on May 1, 2024)
Party	Candidate	Votes	%	±%
Democratic	Sam Liccardo	38,492	21.1	−0.005
Democratic	Evan Low	30,261	16.6	+0.002
Democratic	Joe Simitian	30,256	16.6	−0.001
Republican	Peter Ohtaki	23,283	12.8	+0.001
Democratic	Peter Dixon	14,677	8.1	−0.000
Democratic	Rishi Kumar	12,383	6.8	+0.001
Republican	Karl Ryan	11,563	6.3	+0.001
Democratic	Julie Lythcott-Haims	11,386	6.2	−0.000
Democratic	Ahmed Mostafa	5,814	3.2	+0.001
Democratic	Greg Tanaka	2,421	1.3	−0.000
Democratic	Joby Bernstein	1,652	0.9	+0.000
Total votes		182,188	100.0	
General election
Democratic	Sam Liccardo	179,583	58.2	N/A
Democratic	Evan Low	128,893	41.8	N/A
Total votes		308,476	100.0	
Democratic hold				

== District 17 ==
2024 California's 17th congressional district election
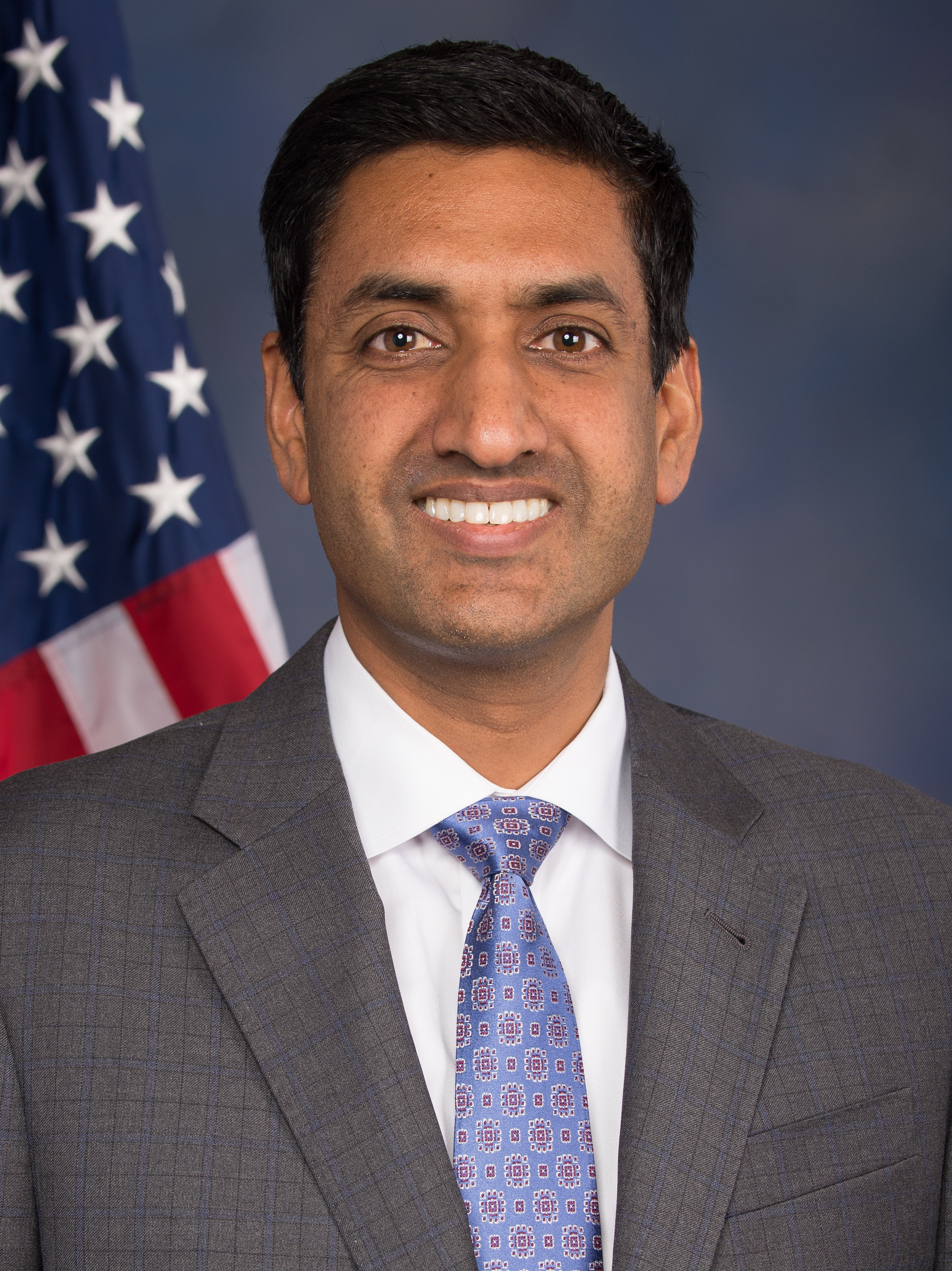

Candidate	Ro Khanna	Anita Chen
Party	Democratic	Republican
Popular vote	172,462	82,415
Percentage	67.7%	32.3%
- County results Khanna: 60–70%
U.S. Representative before election
Ro Khanna
Democratic
Elected U.S. Representative
Ro Khanna
Democratic

The incumbent was Democrat Ro Khanna, who was re-elected with 70.9% of the vote in 2022. Khanna had expressed interest in running for U.S. Senate, but instead chose not to run and endorsed Barbara Lee.

=== Candidates ===
Advanced to general

- Anita Chen (Republican), teacher
- Ro Khanna (Democratic), incumbent U.S. representative

Eliminated in primary

- Joe Dehn (Libertarian), chair of the Santa Clara County Libertarian Party, former secretary of the Libertarian National Committee, and candidate for this district in 2020 and 2022
- Mario Ramirez (Democratic), photographer
- Ritesh Tandon (Democratic), software engineer and Republican runner-up for this district in 2020 and 2022

=== Endorsements ===
Anita Chen (R)

Local officials

- Carl DeMaio, former San Diego city councilor (2008–2012)

Organizations

- California College Republicans
- California ProLife Council
- California Republican Assembly

Political parties

- American Independent Party
- California Republican Party
Joe Dehn (L)

Political parties

- California Libertarian Party
Ro Khanna (D)

Political parties

- California Democratic Party

Organizations

- California Environmental Voters
- California Young Democrats
- Equality California
- Friends of the Earth Action
- Humane Society Legislative Fund
- J Street PAC
- Justice Democrats
- Planned Parenthood Action Fund (post-primary)
- Sierra Club

Labor unions

- AFSCME California
- Alameda County Building Trades Council
- California Federation of Labor
- California Federation of Teachers
- California Professional Firefighters
- California Teachers Association
- IBEW Locals 595 and 1245
- International Brotherhood of Teamsters Joint Council 7
- National Education Association
- National Union of Healthcare Workers
- SEIU United Healthcare Workers West
- South Bay Labor Council
- United Farm Workers

=== Fundraising ===
Campaign finance reports as of February 14, 2024
Candidate	Raised	Spent	Cash on hand
Ro Khanna (D)	$6,592,854	$2,367,495	$9,513,880
Ritesh Tandon (D)	$20,147	$8,224	$12,233
Anita Chen (R)	$15,639	$7,431	$8,208
Source: Federal Election Commission

=== Predictions ===
Source	Ranking	As of
The Cook Political Report	Solid D	February 2, 2023
Inside Elections	Solid D	March 10, 2023
Sabato's Crystal Ball	Safe D	February 23, 2023
Elections Daily	Safe D	February 5, 2024
CNalysis	Solid D	November 16, 2023

=== Results ===
California's 17th congressional district, 2024
Primary election
Party	Candidate	Votes	%
Democratic	Ro Khanna (incumbent)	74,004	62.9
Republican	Anita Chen	31,568	26.8
Democratic	Ritesh Tandon	5,738	4.9
Democratic	Mario Ramirez	4,498	3.8
Libertarian	Joe Dehn	1,839	1.6
Total votes		117,647	100.0
General election
Democratic	Ro Khanna (incumbent)	172,462	67.7
Republican	Anita Chen	82,415	32.3
Total votes		254,877	100.0
Democratic hold			

==== By county ====
County	Ro Khanna Democratic		Anita Chen Republican		Margin		Total votes cast
County	#	%	#	%	#	%	Total votes cast
Alameda (part)	26,121	65.84%	13,555	34.16%	12,566	31.67%	39,676
Santa Clara (part)	146,341	68.00%	68,860	32.00%	77,481	36.00%	215,201
Totals	172,462	67.66%	82,415	32.34%	90,047	35.33%	254,877

== District 18 ==
2024 California's 18th congressional district election
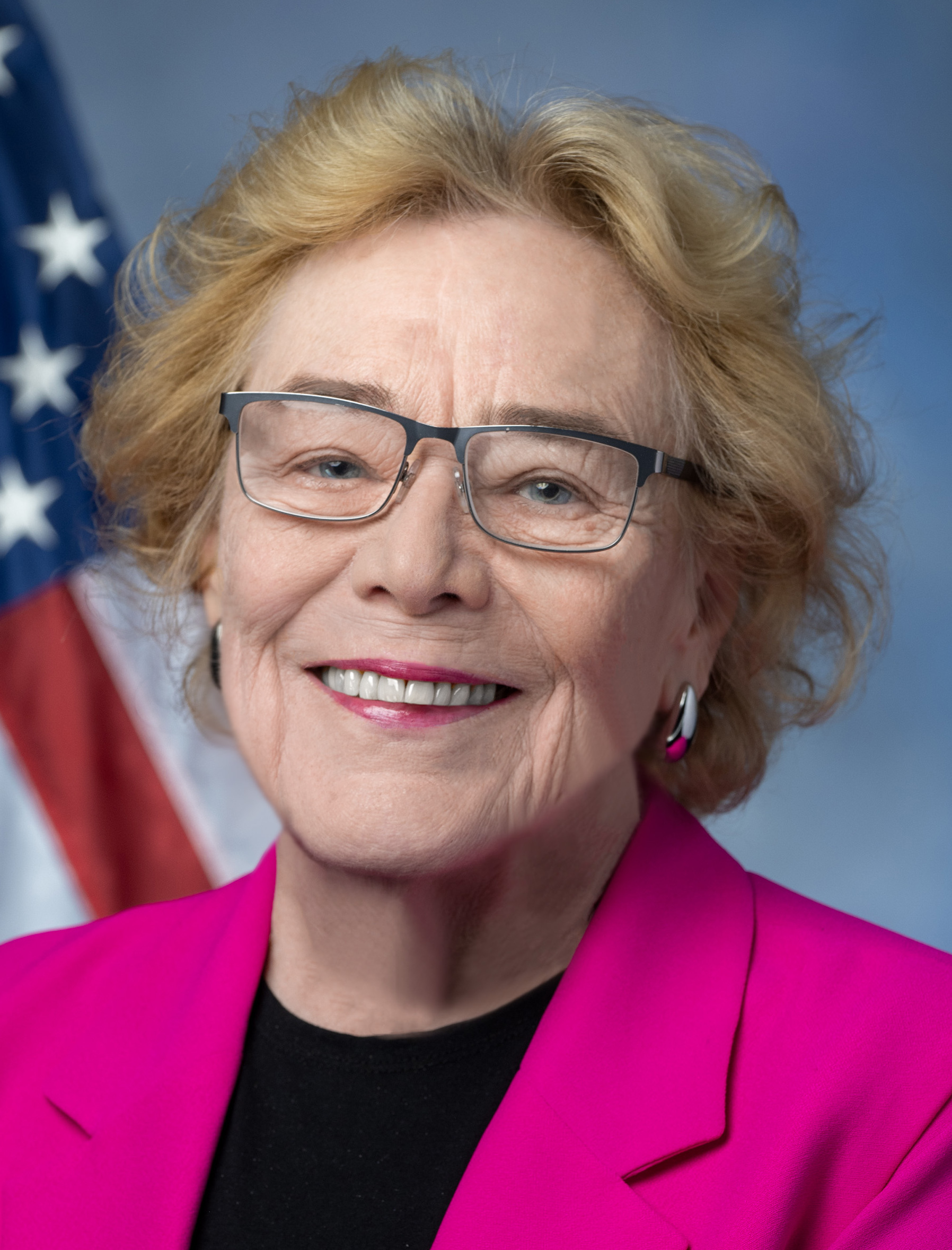

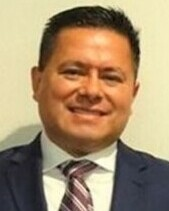
Candidate	Zoe Lofgren	Peter Hernandez
Party	Democratic	Republican
Popular vote	147,674	80,832
Percentage	64.6%	35.4%
- County results Lofgren: 50–60% 60–70% 70–80%
U.S. Representative before election
Zoe Lofgren
Democratic
Elected U.S. Representative
Zoe Lofgren
Democratic

The incumbent was Democrat Zoe Lofgren, who was re-elected with 65.8% of the vote in 2022.

=== Candidates ===
Advanced to general

- Peter Hernandez (Republican), former chair of the San Benito County Board of Supervisors and runner-up for this district in 2022
- Zoe Lofgren (Democratic), incumbent U.S. representative

Eliminated in primary

- Luele Kifle (Democratic), IT consultant
- Lawrence Milan (Democratic), bartender
- Charlene Nijmeh (Democratic), chair of the Muwekma Ohlone Tribe

Declined

- Sam Liccardo (Democratic), former mayor of San Jose (running in the 16th district)

=== Endorsements ===
Peter Hernandez (R)

Local officials

- Carl DeMaio, former San Diego city councilor (2008–2012)

Political parties

- American Independent Party
- California Republican Party

Organizations

- California College Republicans
- California ProLife Council
- California Republican Assembly
Luele Kifle (D)

Organizations

- Vote Common Good
Zoe Lofgren (D)

U.S. representatives

- Hakeem Jeffries, New York's 8th congressional district and House Minority Leader (2023–present)
- Nancy Pelosi, California's 11th congressional district (1987–present) and former Speaker of the House (2007–2011, 2019–2023)

Political parties

- California Democratic Party

Organizations

- California Environmental Voters
- California Young Democrats
- Equality California
- Feminist Majority PAC
- Humane Society Legislative Fund
- J Street PAC
- Planned Parenthood Action Fund (post-primary)
- Sierra Club

Labor unions

- AFSCME California
- California Federation of Labor
- California Federation of Teachers
- California Professional Firefighters
- California Teachers Association
- IBEW Local 1245
- International Brotherhood of Teamsters Joint Council 7
- National Union of Healthcare Workers
- Santa Clara/ San Benito/ Monterey Building Trades Council
- SEIU Local 1021
- SEIU United Healthcare Workers West
- South Bay Labor Council
- United Farm Workers

=== Fundraising ===
Campaign finance reports as of February 14, 2024
Candidate	Raised	Spent	Cash on hand
Zoe Lofgren (D)	$1,380,968	$1,419,890	$372,448
Charlene Nijmeh (D)	$187,518 (Note: $25,000 of this total was self-funded by Nijmeh.)	$140,803	$46,714
Peter Hernandez (R)	$93,247	$88,484	$7,062
Source: Federal Election Commission

=== Predictions ===
Source	Ranking	As of
The Cook Political Report	Solid D	February 2, 2023
Inside Elections	Solid D	March 10, 2023
Sabato's Crystal Ball	Safe D	February 23, 2023
Elections Daily	Safe D	February 5, 2024
CNalysis	Solid D	November 16, 2023

=== Results ===
California's 18th congressional district, 2024
Primary election
Party	Candidate	Votes	%
Democratic	Zoe Lofgren (incumbent)	49,370	51.2
Republican	Peter Hernandez	31,665	32.8
Democratic	Charlene Nijmeh	10,631	11.0
Democratic	Lawrence Milan	2,714	2.8
Democratic	Luele Kifle	2,034	2.1
Total votes		96,414	100.0
General election
Democratic	Zoe Lofgren (incumbent)	147,674	64.6
Republican	Peter Hernandez	80,832	35.4
Total votes		228,506	100.0
Democratic hold			

==== By county ====
County	Zoe Lofgren Democratic		Peter Hernandez Republican		Margin		Total votes cast
County	#	%	#	%	#	%	Total votes cast
Monterey (part)	39,856	61.85%	24,585	38.15%	15,271	23.70%	64,441
San Benito	14,803	54.98%	12,119	45.02%	2,684	9.97%	26,922
Santa Clara (part)	79,781	67.38%	38,620	32.62%	41,161	34.76%	118,401
Santa Cruz (part)	13,234	70.61%	5,508	29.39%	7,726	41.22%	18,742
Totals	147,674	64.63%	80,832	35.37%	66,842	29.25%	228,506

== District 19 ==
2024 California's 19th congressional district election
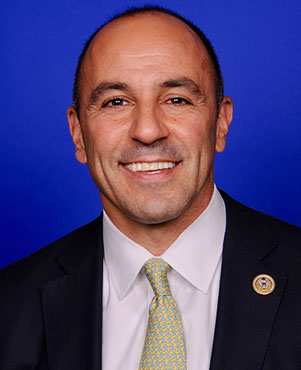

Candidate	Jimmy Panetta	Jason Anderson
Party	Democratic	Republican
Popular vote	252,458	111,862
Percentage	69.3%	30.7%
- County results Panetta: 60–70% 70–80% 80–90% Anderson: 50–60%
U.S. Representative before election
Jimmy Panetta
Democratic
Elected U.S. Representative
Jimmy Panetta
Democratic

The incumbent was Democrat Jimmy Panetta, who had represented the district since 2017 and was re-elected with 68.8% of the vote in 2022.

=== Candidates ===
Advanced to general

- Jason Anderson (Republican), auto repair shop owner
- Jimmy Panetta (Democratic), incumbent U.S. representative

Eliminated in primary

- Sean Dougherty (Green), engineer

=== Endorsements ===
Jason Anderson (R)

Local officials

- Carl DeMaio, former San Diego city councilor (2008–2012)

Organizations

- California College Republicans
- California ProLife Council
- California Rifle and Pistol Association

Political parties

- American Independent Party
Sean Dougherty (G)

Political parties

- Peace and Freedom Party
- Santa Clara County Green Party
Jimmy Panetta (D)

Political parties

- California Democratic Party

Organizations

- AIPAC
- California Environmental Voters
- California Young Democrats
- Democratic Majority for Israel
- Equality California
- Humane Society Legislative Fund
- Planned Parenthood Action Fund (post-primary)
- Pro-Israel America
- Sierra Club
- With Honor Fund

Labor unions

- AFSCME California
- California Federation of Labor
- California Federation of Teachers
- California Professional Firefighters
- California Teachers Association
- IBEW Local 1245
- International Brotherhood of Teamsters Joint Council 7
- National Education Association
- National Union of Healthcare Workers
- Santa Clara/ San Benito/ Monterey Building Trades Council
- SEIU United Healthcare Workers West
- South Bay Labor Council

=== Fundraising ===
Campaign finance reports as of February 14, 2024
Candidate	Raised	Spent	Cash on hand
Jimmy Panetta (D)	$1,776,745	$752,004	$3,205,151
Jason Anderson (R)	$13,024 (Note: $10,000 of this total was self-funded by Anderson.)	$1,276	$11,748
Sean Dougherty (G)	$6,506 (Note: $110 of this total was self-funded by Dougherty.)	$3,716	$2,789
Source: Federal Election Commission

=== Predictions ===
Source	Ranking	As of
The Cook Political Report	Solid D	February 2, 2023
Inside Elections	Solid D	March 10, 2023
Sabato's Crystal Ball	Safe D	February 23, 2023
Elections Daily	Safe D	February 5, 2024
CNalysis	Solid D	November 16, 2023

=== Results ===
California's 19th congressional district, 2024
Primary election
Party	Candidate	Votes	%
Democratic	Jimmy Panetta (incumbent)	132,711	65.0
Republican	Jason Anderson	58,285	28.6
Green	Sean Dougherty	13,080	6.4
Total votes		204,076	100.0
General election
Democratic	Jimmy Panetta (incumbent)	252,458	69.3
Republican	Jason Anderson	111,862	30.7
Total votes		364,320	100.0
Democratic hold			

==== By county ====
County	Jimmy Panetta Democratic		Jason Anderson Republican		Margin		Total votes cast
County	#	%	#	%	#	%	Total votes cast
Monterey (part)	58,462	73.08%	21,532	26.92%	36,930	46.17%	79,994
San Luis Obispo (part)	24,203	46.22%	28,162	53.78%	−3,959	−7.56%	52,365
Santa Clara (part)	80,447	66.71%	40,149	33.29%	40,298	33.42%	120,596
Santa Cruz (part)	89,346	80.23%	22,019	19.77%	67,327	60.46%	111,365
Totals	252,458	69.30%	111,862	30.70%	140,596	38.59%	364,320

== District 20 ==
2024 California's 20th congressional district election
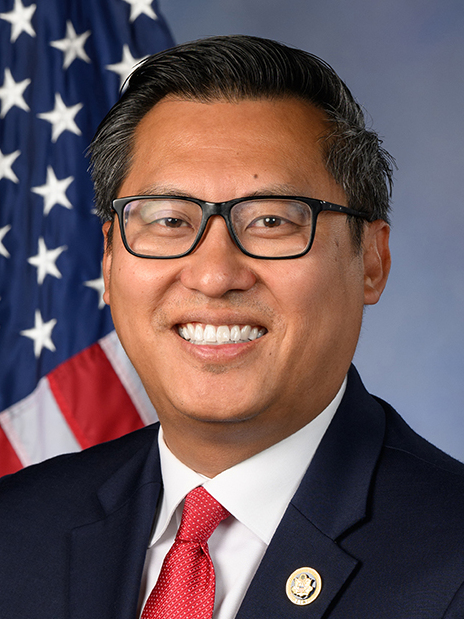

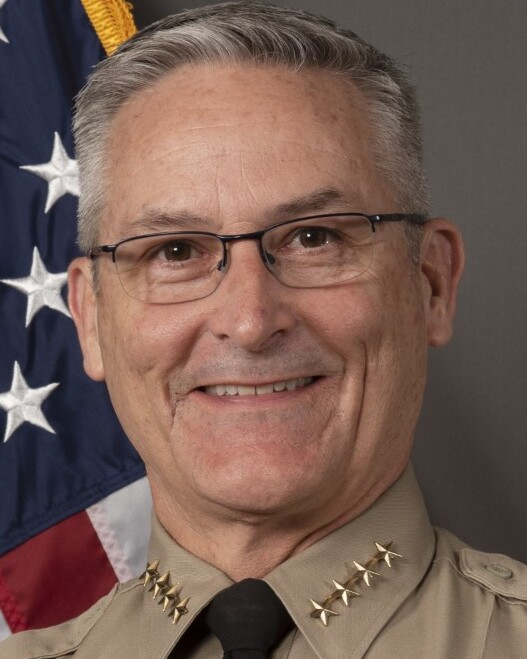
Candidate	Vince Fong	Mike Boudreaux (withdrawn)
Party	Republican	Republican
Popular vote	187,862	100,926
Percentage	65.1%	34.9%
- County results Fong: 50–60% 70–80% Boudreaux: 50–60%
U.S. Representative before election
Vince Fong
Republican
Elected U.S. Representative
Vince Fong
Republican

The incumbent was Republican Kevin McCarthy, who was re-elected with 67.2% of the vote in 2022. McCarthy resigned on December 31, 2023, after his removal as Speaker of the House. A special election was held in May 2024 to fill McCarthy's vacant seat, which was won by Vince Fong, a state assemblyman who had formerly served as McCarthy's district director.

=== Candidates ===
Advanced to general

- Mike Boudreaux (Republican), Tulare County sheriff and runner-up in the May 2024 special election for this district (withdrew July 2024, endorsed Fong)
- Vince Fong (Republican), incumbent U.S. representative

Eliminated in primary

- James Cardoza (no party preference), realtor (write-in)
- Ben Dewell (no party preference), meteorologist and Democratic candidate for this district in 2022
- Stan Ellis (Republican), farmer
- Kyle Kirkland (Republican), casino owner and chairman of the board for Fresno Chaffee Zoo
- Kelly Kulikoff (Republican), mayor of California City
- Andy Morales (Democratic), security officer
- Matt Stoll (Republican), landscaping business owner and candidate for the 21st district in 2022
- Marisa Wood (Democratic), teacher and runner-up for this district in 2022

Withdrawn

- John Burrows (Democratic), spokesman for Fresno city councilor Nelson Esparza (endorsed Wood)
- TJ Esposito (no party preference), businessman (remained on ballot)
- David Giglio (Republican), businessman and candidate for the 13th district in 2022 (endorsed Boudreaux, remained on ballot)
- Kevin McCarthy, former U.S. Representative and former Speaker of the House (endorsed Fong)

Declined

- Garry Bredefeld (Republican), Fresno city councilor (ran for the Fresno County Board of Supervisors)
- Tal Eslick (Republican), political consultant and former chief of staff for U.S. Representative David Valadao
- Shannon Grove (Republican), state senator for the 12th district (2018–present) and former senate minority leader (2019–2021)
- Devon Mathis (Republican), state assemblyman for the 33rd district (2014–present)
- Jim Patterson (Republican), state assemblyman for the 32nd district (2016–present), former mayor of Fresno (1993–2001), and candidate for this district (Note: Numbered as the 21st district prior to the 2010 redistricting cycle and as the 22nd district from then until the 2020 redistricting cycle) in 2002 and the 9th district (Note: Numbered as the 19th district prior to the 2020 redistricting cycle) in 2010
- Cole Rajewski (Republican), political consultant and former chief of staff for U.S. Representative David Valadao
- Pete Vander Poel (Republican), Tulare County supervisor (ran for re-election)

=== Endorsements ===
Mike Boudreaux (R)

U.S. executive branch officials

- Richard Grenell, acting Director of National Intelligence (2020), U.S. Ambassador to Germany (2018–2020)

U.S. representatives

- Connie Conway, former U.S. representative from California's 22nd congressional district (2022–2023)

State officials

- Mike Huckabee, governor of Arkansas (1996–2007)

State legislators

- Shannon Grove (Republican), state senator for the 12th district (2018–present) and former senate minority leader (2019–2021)
- Devon Mathis, state assemblyman for the 33rd district (2014–present)
- Andy Vidak, former state senator for the 14th district (2013–2018)

Individuals

- Kash Patel, former Trump aide

Organizations

- California ProLife Council
- California Republican Assembly
- California Rifle and Pistol Association (co-endorsement with Fong)

Labor unions

- International Brotherhood of Teamsters Joint Council 7

Newspapers

- The Fresno Bee
Vince Fong (R)

Executive branch officials

- Donald Trump, former president of the United States

U.S. representatives

- Ken Calvert, U.S. representative from California's 41st congressional district (1993–present)
- John Duarte, U.S. representative from California's 13th congressional district (2023–present)
- Darrell Issa, U.S. representative from California's 48th congressional district (2001–2019, 2021–present)
- Mike Johnson, U.S. representative from Louisiana's 4th congressional district (2017–present) and Speaker of the House (2023–present)
- Young Kim, U.S. representative from California's 40th congressional district (2021–present)
- Doug LaMalfa, U.S. representative from California's 1st congressional district (2015–present)
- Kevin McCarthy, U.S. representative from California's 20th congressional district (2007–2023)
- Jay Obernolte, U.S. representative from California's 8th congressional district (2021–present)
- Michelle Steel, U.S. representative from California's 45th congressional district (2021–present)

Local officials

- Karen Goh, mayor of Bakersfield (2017–present)

Organizations

- California Rifle and Pistol Association (co-endorsement with Boudreaux)
- Howard Jarvis Taxpayers Association
- National Rifle Association Political Victory Fund
- Susan B. Anthony List

Labor unions

- National Border Patrol Council
Marisa Wood (D)

Individuals

- John Burrows, spokesman for Fresno city councilor Nelson Esparza and former candidate for this seat
John Burrows (D) (withdrawn)

Political parties

- California Democratic Party
David Giglio (R) (withdrawn)

Federal officials

- Michael Flynn, former National Security Advisor (2017), former Director of the Defense Intelligence Agency (2012–2014)

Organizations

- Republicans for National Renewal

Individuals

- Roger Stone, conservative political consultant and lobbyist
Kevin McCarthy (R) (withdrawn)

Political parties

- California Republican Party

=== Fundraising ===
Campaign finance reports as of February 14, 2024
Candidate	Raised	Spent	Cash on hand
Mike Boudreaux (R)	$280,633	$155,635	$124,997
Vince Fong (R)	$768,246	$613,008	$155,237
Kyle Kirkland (R)	$289,791 (Note: $135,000 of this total was self-funded by Kirkland.)	$274,809	$14,981
Matt Stoll (R)	$20,100 (Note: $20,000 of this total was self-funded by Stoll.)	$3,457	$16,642
Andy Morales (D)	$142,062	$140,139	$1,923
Marisa Wood (D)	$71,955	$36,844	$39,608
Ben Dewell (NPP)	$1,785 (Note: $1,700 of this total was self-funded by Dewell.)	$1,742	$605
Source: Federal Election Commission

=== Polling ===
Poll source	Date(s) administered	Sample size	Margin of error	Mike Boudreaux (R)	Vince Fong (R)	Kyle Kirkland (R)	Andy Morales (D)	Marisa Wood (D)	Other	Undecided
Emerson College	January 26–29, 2024	565 (LV)	± 4.1%	11%	27%	4%	8%	11%	5% (Note: David Giglio (R) with 2%; Ben Dewell (NPP), Kelly Kulikoff (R), and Matt Stoll (R) with 1%; TJ Esposito (NPP) with 0%)	35%

=== Predictions ===
Source	Ranking	As of
The Cook Political Report	Solid R	February 2, 2023
Inside Elections	Solid R	March 10, 2023
Sabato's Crystal Ball	Safe R	February 23, 2023
Elections Daily	Safe R	February 5, 2024
CNalysis	Solid R	November 16, 2023

=== Results ===
Primary results by county: Fong—50–60% Fong—30–40% Boudreaux—30–40% Boudreaux—50–60%

California's 20th congressional district, 2024
Primary election
Party	Candidate	Votes	%
Republican	Vince Fong (incumbent)	66,160	41.9
Republican	Mike Boudreaux	37,883	24.0
Democratic	Marisa Wood	33,509	21.2
Republican	Kyle Kirkland	6,429	4.1
Democratic	Andy Morales	4,381	2.8
Republican	Stan Ellis	3,252	2.1
Republican	David Giglio (withdrawn)	2,224	1.4
No party preference	Ben Dewell	1,509	1.0
Republican	Matt Stoll	1,131	0.7
Republican	Kelly Kulikoff	724	0.5
No party preference	TJ Esposito (withdrawn)	541	0.3
No party preference	James Cardoza (write-in)	9	0.0
Total votes		157,752	100.0
General election
Republican	Vince Fong (incumbent)	187,862	65.1
Republican	Mike Boudreaux (withdrawn)	100,926	34.9
Total votes		288,788	100.0
Republican hold			

==== By county ====
County	Vince Fong Republican		Mike Boudreaux Republican		Margin		Total votes cast
County	#	%	#	%	#	%	Total votes cast
Fresno (part)	46,702	59.83%	31,350	40.17%	15,352	19.67%	78,052
Kern (part)	110,314	74.16%	38,440	25.84%	71,874	48.32%	148,754
Kings (part)	10,402	53.74%	8,954	46.26%	1,448	7.48%	19,356
Tulare (part)	20,444	47.96%	22,182	52.04%	−1,738	−4.08%	42,626
Totals	187,862	65.05%	100,926	34.95%	86,936	30.10%	288,788

== District 21 ==
2024 California's 21st congressional district election
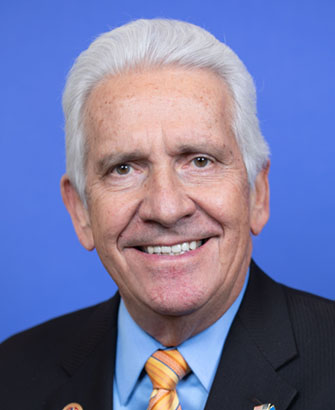

Candidate	Jim Costa	Michael Maher
Party	Democratic	Republican
Popular vote	102,798	92,733
Percentage	52.6%	47.4%
- County results Costa: 50–60% Maher: 50–60%
U.S. Representative before election
Jim Costa
Democratic
Elected U.S. Representative
Jim Costa
Democratic

The incumbent was Democrat Jim Costa, who had represented the district since 2005 and was re-elected with 54.0% of the vote in 2022. Costa won re-election by 5.2 percentage points, a much narrower margin than what was predicted by pundits and outlets.

=== Candidates ===
Advanced to general

- Jim Costa (Democratic), incumbent U.S. representative
- Michael Maher (Republican), aviation business owner and runner-up for this district in 2022

=== Endorsements ===
Jim Costa (D)

Political parties

- California Democratic Party

Organizations

- AIPAC
- California Young Democrats
- Democratic Majority for Israel
- Equality California
- International Franchise Association
- Planned Parenthood Action Fund (post-primary)
- Pro-Israel America

Labor unions

- AFSCME California
- California Federation of Labor
- California Federation of Teachers
- California Professional Firefighters
- California Teachers Association
- Fresno-Madera-Kings-Tulare Building Trades Council
- IBEW Local 1245
- National Education Association
- National Union of Healthcare Workers

Newspapers

- The Fresno Bee
Michael Maher (R)

U.S. representatives

- Connie Conway, former U.S. representative from CA-22 (2022–2023)
- John Duarte, U.S. representative from CA-13 (2023–present)
- Tom McClintock, U.S. representative from CA-05 (Note: This district was numbered as the 4th district prior to the 2020 redistricting cycle.) (2005–present)
- George Radanovich, former U.S. representative from CA-19 (1995–2011)

State legislators

- Vince Fong, state assemblymember from the 32nd district (2016–present) and candidate for CA-20
- Shannon Grove, state senator from the 12th district (2018–present)
- Devon Mathis, state assemblymember from the 33rd district (2014–present)

Local officials

- Carl DeMaio, former San Diego city councilor (2008–2012)

Organizations

- California College Republicans
- California ProLife Council
- California Republican Assembly

Political parties

- California Republican Party
- Fresno County Republican Party
- Tulare County Republican Party

=== Fundraising ===
Campaign finance reports as of February 14, 2024
Candidate	Raised	Spent	Cash on hand
Jim Costa (D)	$917,344	$478,139	$828,283
Michael Maher (R)	$307,141 (Note: $5,000 of this total was self-funded by Maher.)	$208,992	$100,372
Source: Federal Election Commission

=== Predictions ===
Source	Ranking	As of
The Cook Political Report	Solid D	February 2, 2023
Inside Elections	Solid D	March 10, 2023
Sabato's Crystal Ball	Safe D	February 23, 2023
Elections Daily	Likely D	March 22, 2024
CNalysis	Solid D	November 16, 2023

=== Results ===
California's 21st congressional district, 2024
Primary election
Party	Candidate	Votes	%
Democratic	Jim Costa (incumbent)	42,697	53.0
Republican	Michael Maher	37,935	47.0
Total votes		80,632	100.0
General election
Democratic	Jim Costa (incumbent)	102,798	52.6
Republican	Michael Maher	92,733	47.4
Total votes		195,531	100.0
Democratic hold			

==== By county ====
County	Jim Costa Democratic		Michael Maher Republican		Margin		Total votes cast
County	#	%	#	%	#	%	Total votes cast
Fresno (part)	83,515	56.12%	65,297	43.88%	18,218	12.24%	148,812
Tulare (part)	19,283	41.27%	27,436	58.73%	−8,153	−17.45%	46,719
Totals	102,798	52.57%	92,733	47.43%	10,065	5.15%	195,531

== District 22 ==
2024 California's 22nd congressional district election
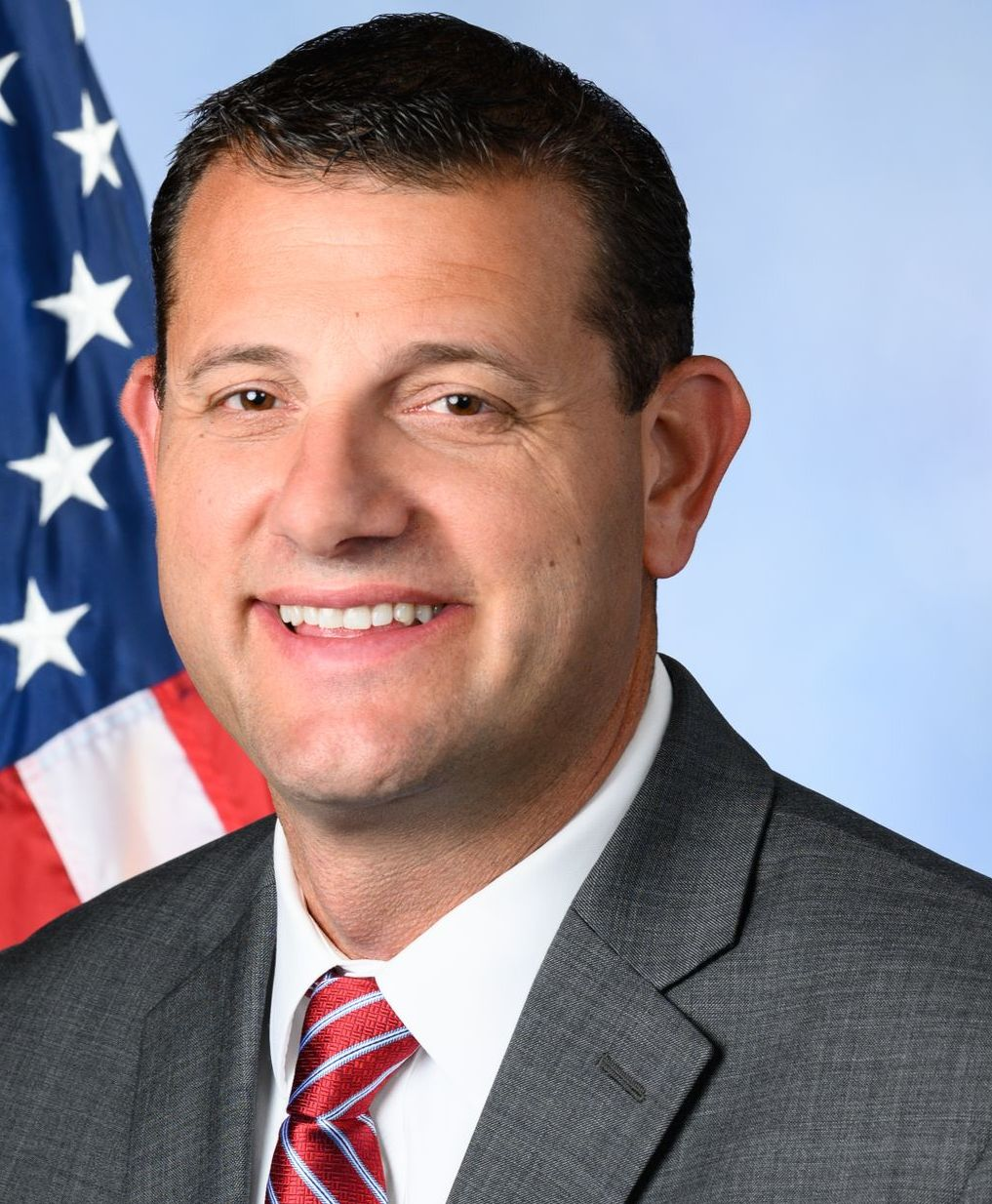

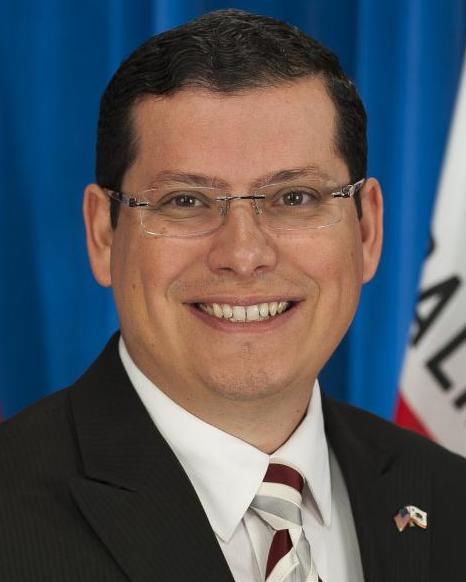
Candidate	David Valadao	Rudy Salas
Party	Republican	Democratic
Popular vote	89,484	78,023
Percentage	53.4%	46.6%
- County results Valadao: 50–60%
U.S. Representative before election
David Valadao
Republican
Elected U.S. Representative
David Valadao
Republican

The incumbent was Republican David Valadao, who was re-elected with 51.6% of the vote in 2022.

=== Candidates ===
Advanced to general

- Rudy Salas (Democratic), former state assemblyman from the 32nd district (2012–2022) and runner-up for this district in 2022
- David Valadao (Republican), incumbent U.S. representative

Eliminated in primary

- Melissa Hurtado (Democratic), state senator from the 16th district (2018–present)
- Chris Mathys (Republican), former Fresno city councilor (1997–2001) and candidate for this district in 2022

=== Endorsements ===
Melissa Hurtado (D)

Statewide officials

- Eleni Kounalakis, lieutenant governor of California (2019–present) (co-endorsement with Salas)

State legislators

- Jasmeet Bains, state assemblymember from the 35th district (2022–present)
Chris Mathys (R)

Organizations

- California Republican Assembly

Political parties

- American Independent Party
Rudy Salas (D)

U.S. senators

- Alex Padilla, U.S. senator from California (2021–present)

U.S. representatives

- Pete Aguilar, CA-33 (2015–present)
- Zoe Lofgren, CA-18 (1995–present)
- Nancy Pelosi, former Speaker of the House (2007–2011, 2019–2023) from CA-11 (1987–present)

Statewide officials

- Rob Bonta, Attorney General of California (2021–present)
- Malia Cohen, California State Controller (2023–present)
- Eleni Kounalakis, lieutenant governor of California (2019–present) (co-endorsement with Hurtado)
- Gavin Newsom, governor of California (2019–present)

Individuals

- Dolores Huerta, labor leader and civil rights activist

Political parties

- California Democratic Party

Organizations

- Blue Dog PAC
- California Rifle and Pistol Association (co-endorsement with Valadao)
- California Young Democrats
- Congressional Hispanic Caucus BOLD PAC
- DCCC Red to Blue
- Democratic Majority for Israel (post-primary)
- Equality California
- Feminist Majority PAC
- Jewish Democratic Council of America
- Latino Victory Fund
- NewDem Action Fund
- Planned Parenthood Action Fund (post-primary)
- Reproductive Freedom for All
- Vote Common Good

Labor unions

- AFSCME California
- California Federation of Labor
- California Teachers Association
- IBEW Local 1245
- International Brotherhood of Teamsters Joint Council 7
- National Education Association
- National Union of Healthcare Workers
- SEIU California and United Healthcare Workers West
- United Farm Workers

Newspapers

- The Fresno Bee
David Valadao (R)

State officials

- Mike Huckabee, governor of Arkansas (1996–2007)

Local officials

- Carl DeMaio, former San Diego city councilor (2008–2012)

Political parties

- California Republican Party

Organizations

- AIPAC
- BIPAC
- California College Republicans
- California ProLife Council
- California Rifle and Pistol Association (co-endorsement with Salas)
- ClearPath Action Fund
- National Rifle Association Political Victory Fund
- Pro-Israel America
- Republican Jewish Coalition

=== Fundraising ===
Campaign finance reports as of June 30, 2024
Candidate	Raised	Spent	Cash on hand
Chris Mathys (R)	$337,867 (Note: $325,000 of this total was self-funded by Mathys.)	$337,142	$1,225
David Valadao (R)	$3,431,218	$1,479,413	$2,000,244
Melissa Hurtado (D)	$84,532	$84,162	$369
Rudy Salas (D)	$3,123,937	$1,396,838	$1,741,507
Source: Federal Election Commission

=== Predictions ===
Source	Ranking	As of
The Cook Political Report	Tossup	November 16, 2023
Inside Elections	Tossup	October 31, 2024
Sabato's Crystal Ball	Lean R	November 4, 2024
Elections Daily	Lean R	November 4, 2024
CNalysis	Tilt D (flip)	November 4, 2024

=== Polling ===
Poll source	Date(s) administered	Sample size	Margin of error	David Valadao (R)	Rudy Salas (D)	Undecided
Emerson College (Note: Poll sponsored by Nexstar, The Hill, and Inside California Politics)	October 22–26, 2024	525 (LV)	± 4.2%	45%	47%	8%
Emerson College (Note: Poll sponsored by Nexstar)	September 23–26, 2024	350 (LV)	± 5.2%	45%	45%	10%
USC/CSU	September 14–21, 2024	263 (LV)	± 6.1%	44%	47%	9% (Note: "Won't vote" with 3%)
Normington, Petts & Associates (D) (Note: Poll sponsored by House Majority PAC)	August 25–27, 2024	400 (LV)	–	44%	46%	10%
Change Research (D) (Note: Poll sponsored by Future Majority PAC, which supports Salas)	August 10–17, 2024	479 (LV)	± 2.2%	44%	38%	18%

=== Results ===
Primary results by county: Valadao—30–40% Salas—30–40%

California's 22nd congressional district, 2024
Primary election
Party	Candidate	Votes	%
Republican	David Valadao (incumbent)	20,479	32.7
Democratic	Rudy Salas	19,592	31.3
Republican	Chris Mathys	13,745	22.0
Democratic	Melissa Hurtado	8,733	14.0
Total votes		62,549	100.0
General election
Republican	David Valadao (incumbent)	89,484	53.4
Democratic	Rudy Salas	78,023	46.6
Total votes		167,507	100.0
Republican hold			

==== By county ====
County	David Valadao Republican		Rudy Salas Democratic		Margin		Total votes cast
County	#	%	#	%	#	%	Total votes cast
Kern (part)	54,058	50.60%	52,786	49.40%	1,272	1.19%	106,844
Kings (part)	10,841	56.89%	8,214	43.11%	2,627	13.79%	19,055
Tulare (part)	24,585	59.09%	17,023	40.91%	7,562	18.17%	41,608
Totals	89,484	53.42%	78,023	46.58%	11,461	6.84%	167,507

== District 23 ==
2024 California's 23rd congressional district election
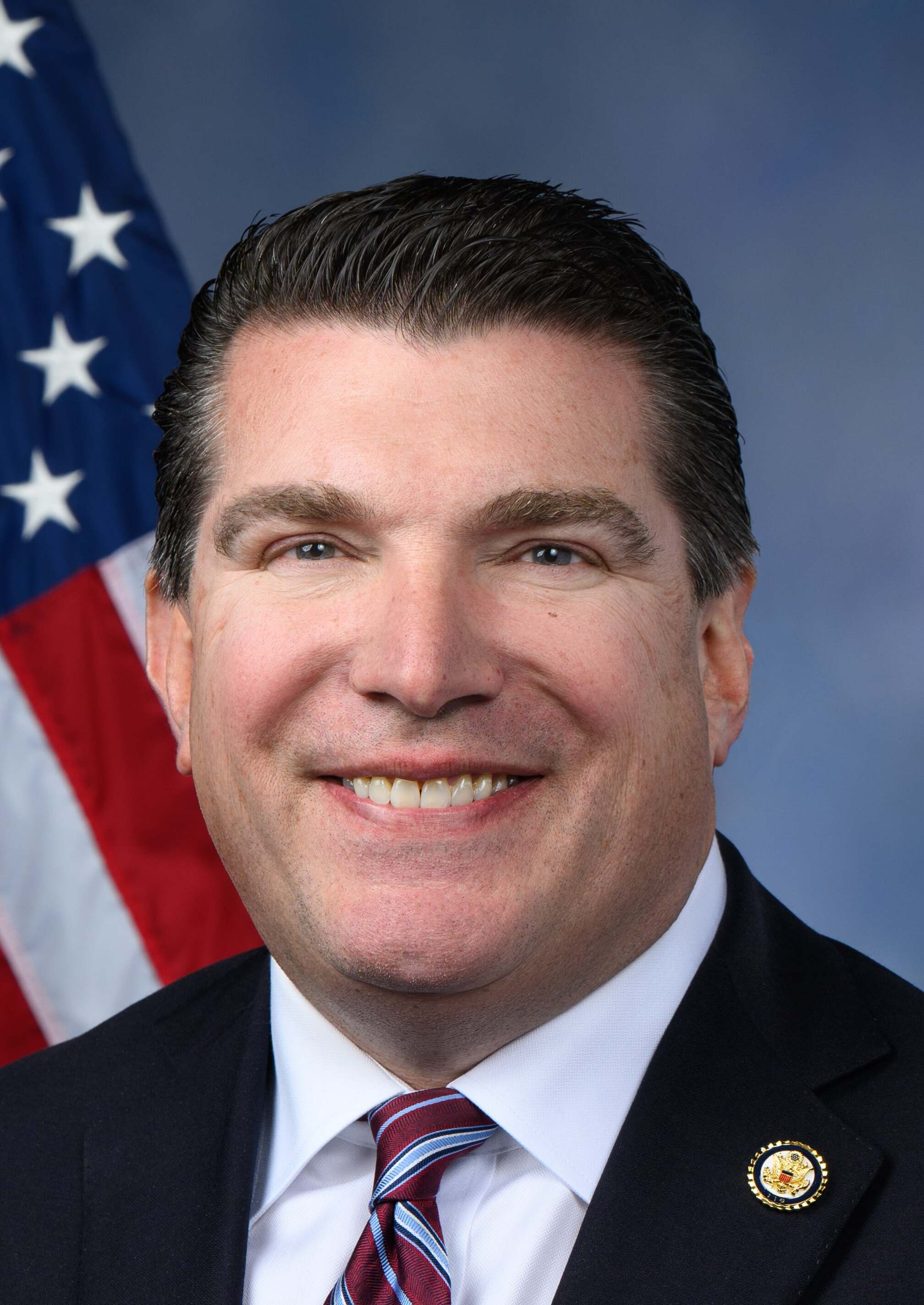

Candidate	Jay Obernolte	Derek Marshall
Party	Republican	Democratic
Popular vote	159,286	105,563
Percentage	60.1%	39.9%
- County results Obernolte: 50–60% 60–70%
U.S. Representative before election
Jay Obernolte
Republican
Elected U.S. Representative
Jay Obernolte
Republican

The incumbent was Republican Jay Obernolte, who had represented the district since 2021 and was re-elected with 61.0% of the vote in 2022.

=== Candidates ===
Advanced to general

- Derek Marshall (Democratic), community activist and runner-up for this district in 2022
- Jay Obernolte (Republican), incumbent U.S. representative

=== Endorsements ===
Derek Marshall (D)

Political parties

- California Democratic Party
- Los Angeles Democratic Party
- Working Families Party

Organizations

- Americans for Democratic Action Southern California
- California Young Democrats
- Center for Biological Diversity Action Fund
- Desert Stonewall Democrats
- Equality California
- Stonewall Democratic Club

Labor unions

- California Federation of Labor
- California Federation of Teachers
- California Teachers Association
- IBEW Local 440
- National Education Association
- National Union of Healthcare Workers
- United Auto Workers
Jay Obernolte (R)

State officials

- Mike Huckabee, governor of Arkansas (1996–2007)

Local officials

- Carl DeMaio, former San Diego city councilor (2008–2012)

Organizations

- AIPAC
- California College Republicans
- California ProLife Council
- California Rifle and Pistol Association
- National Rifle Association Political Victory Fund

Labor unions

- California Professional Firefighters
- IBEW Local 1245

Newspapers

- Inland Valley Daily Bulletin
- The Press-Enterprise
- Redlands Daily Facts
- The San Bernardino Sun

Political parties

- California Republican Party

=== Fundraising ===
Campaign finance reports as of February 14, 2024
Candidate	Raised	Spent	Cash on hand
Jay Obernolte (R)	$791,628	$283,636	$878,145
Derek Marshall (D)	$336,761	$266,088	$84,924
Source: Federal Election Commission

=== Predictions ===
Source	Ranking	As of
The Cook Political Report	Solid R	February 2, 2023
Inside Elections	Solid R	March 10, 2023
Sabato's Crystal Ball	Safe R	February 23, 2023
Elections Daily	Safe R	February 5, 2024
CNalysis	Solid R	November 16, 2023

=== Results ===
California's 23rd congressional district, 2024
Primary election
Party	Candidate	Votes	%
Republican	Jay Obernolte (incumbent)	70,208	63.4
Democratic	Derek Marshall	40,477	36.6
Total votes		110,685	100.0
General election
Republican	Jay Obernolte (incumbent)	159,286	60.1
Democratic	Derek Marshall	105,563	39.9
Total votes		264,849	100.0
Republican hold			

==== By county ====
County	Jay Obernolte Republican		Derek Marshall Democratic		Margin		Total votes cast
County	#	%	#	%	#	%	Total votes cast
Kern (part)	3,127	58.42%	2,226	41.58%	901	16.83%	5,353
Los Angeles (part)	2,406	52.75%	2,155	47.25%	251	5.50%	4,561
San Bernardino (part)	153,753	60.31%	101,182	39.69%	52,571	20.62%	254,935
Totals	159,286	60.14%	105,563	39.86%	53,723	20.28%	264,849

== District 24 ==
2024 California's 24th congressional district election
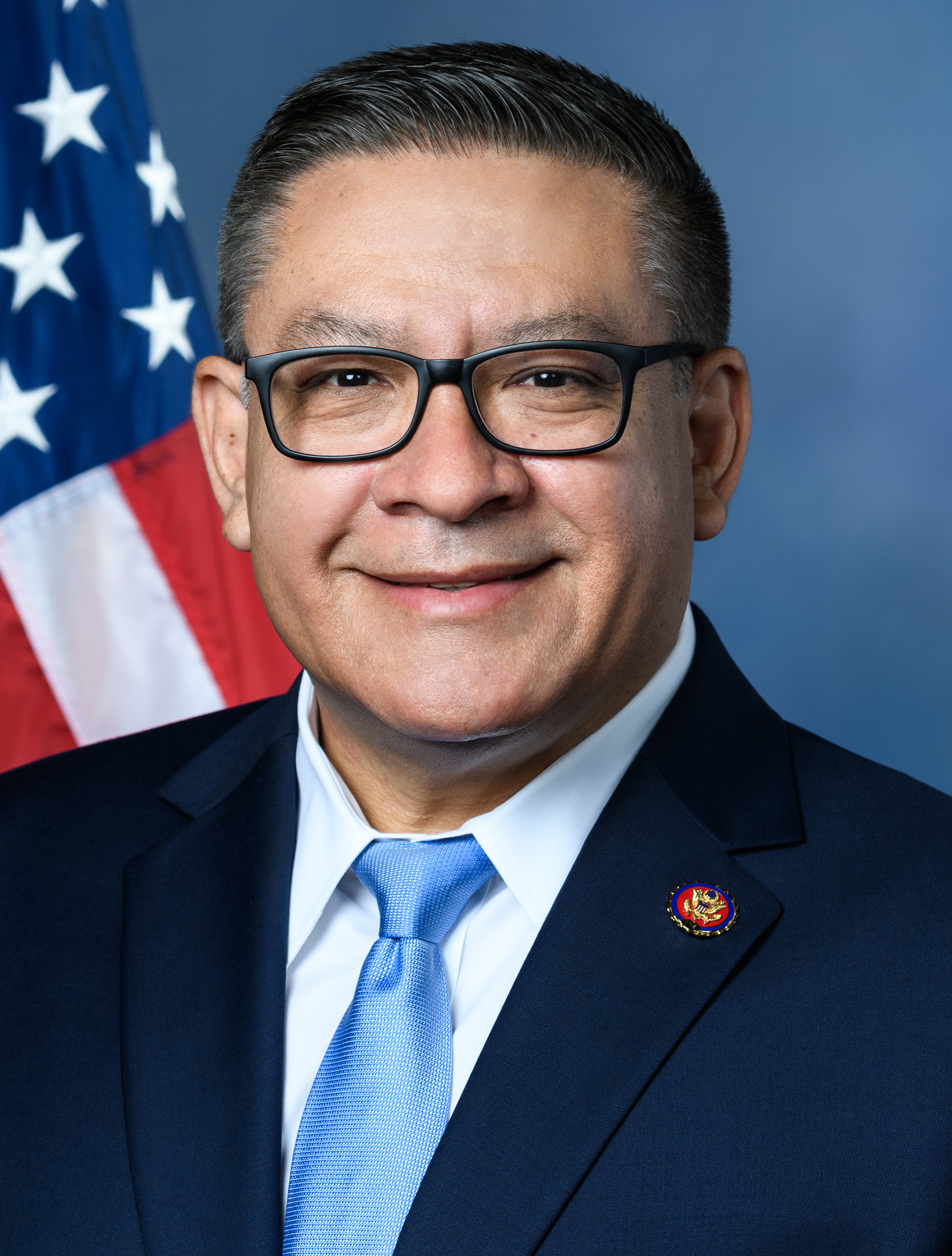

Candidate	Salud Carbajal	Thomas Cole
Party	Democratic	Republican
Popular vote	214,724	127,755
Percentage	62.7%	37.3%
- County results Carbajal: 60–70%
U.S. Representative before election
Salud Carbajal
Democratic
Elected U.S. Representative
Salud Carbajal
Democratic

The incumbent was Democrat Salud Carbajal, who had represented the district since 2017 and was re-elected with 60.7% of the vote in 2022.

=== Candidates ===
Advanced to general

- Salud Carbajal (Democratic), incumbent U.S. representative
- Thomas Cole (Republican), campaign data analyst

Eliminated in primary

- Helena Pasquarella (Democratic), teacher

=== Endorsements ===
Salud Carbajal (D)

U.S. representatives

- Gabby Giffords, U.S. representative from Arizona's 8th congressional district (2007–2012)

Political parties

- California Democratic Party

Organizations

- California Environmental Voters
- California Young Democrats
- Equality California
- Everytown for Gun Safety Action Fund
- Giffords
- Humane Society Legislative Fund
- J Street PAC
- League of Conservation Voters
- Planned Parenthood Action Fund
- Sierra Club
- With Honor Fund

Labor unions

- AFSCME California
- Association of Flight Attendants (post-primary)
- California Federation of Labor
- California Federation of Teachers
- California Professional Firefighters
- California Teachers Association
- IBEW Locals 413 and 1245
- National Education Association
- National Union of Healthcare Workers
- SEIU United Healthcare Workers West
- United Farm Workers

Newspapers

- Santa Barbara Independent
Thomas Cole (R)

Political parties

- American Independent Party

=== Fundraising ===
Campaign finance reports as of February 14, 2024
Candidate	Raised	Spent	Cash on hand
Salud Carbajal (D)	$1,258,354	$672,803	$2,689,537
Thomas Cole (R)	$10,370 (Note: $8,920 of this total was self-funded by Cole.)	$8,920	$14,500
Source: Federal Election Commission

=== Predictions ===
Source	Ranking	As of
The Cook Political Report	Solid D	February 2, 2023
Inside Elections	Solid D	March 10, 2023
Sabato's Crystal Ball	Safe D	February 23, 2023
Elections Daily	Safe D	February 5, 2024
CNalysis	Solid D	November 16, 2023

=== Results ===
California's 24th congressional district, 2024
Primary election
Party	Candidate	Votes	%
Democratic	Salud Carbajal (incumbent)	102,516	53.7
Republican	Thomas Cole	71,089	37.2
Democratic	Helena Pasquarella	17,293	9.1
Total votes		190,898	100.0
General election
Democratic	Salud Carbajal (incumbent)	214,724	62.7
Republican	Thomas Cole	127,755	37.3
Total votes		342,479	100.0
Democratic hold			

==== By county ====
County	Salud Carbajal Democratic		Thomas Cole Republican		Margin		Total votes cast
County	#	%	#	%	#	%	Total votes cast
San Luis Obispo (part)	57,345	60.98%	36,690	39.02%	20,655	21.97%	94,035
Santa Barbara	114,298	63.53%	65,628	36.47%	48,670	27.05%	179,926
Ventura (part)	43,081	62.88%	25,437	37.12%	17,644	25.75%	68,518
Totals	214,724	62.70%	127,755	37.30%	86,969	25.39%	342,479

== District 25 ==
2024 California's 25th congressional district election
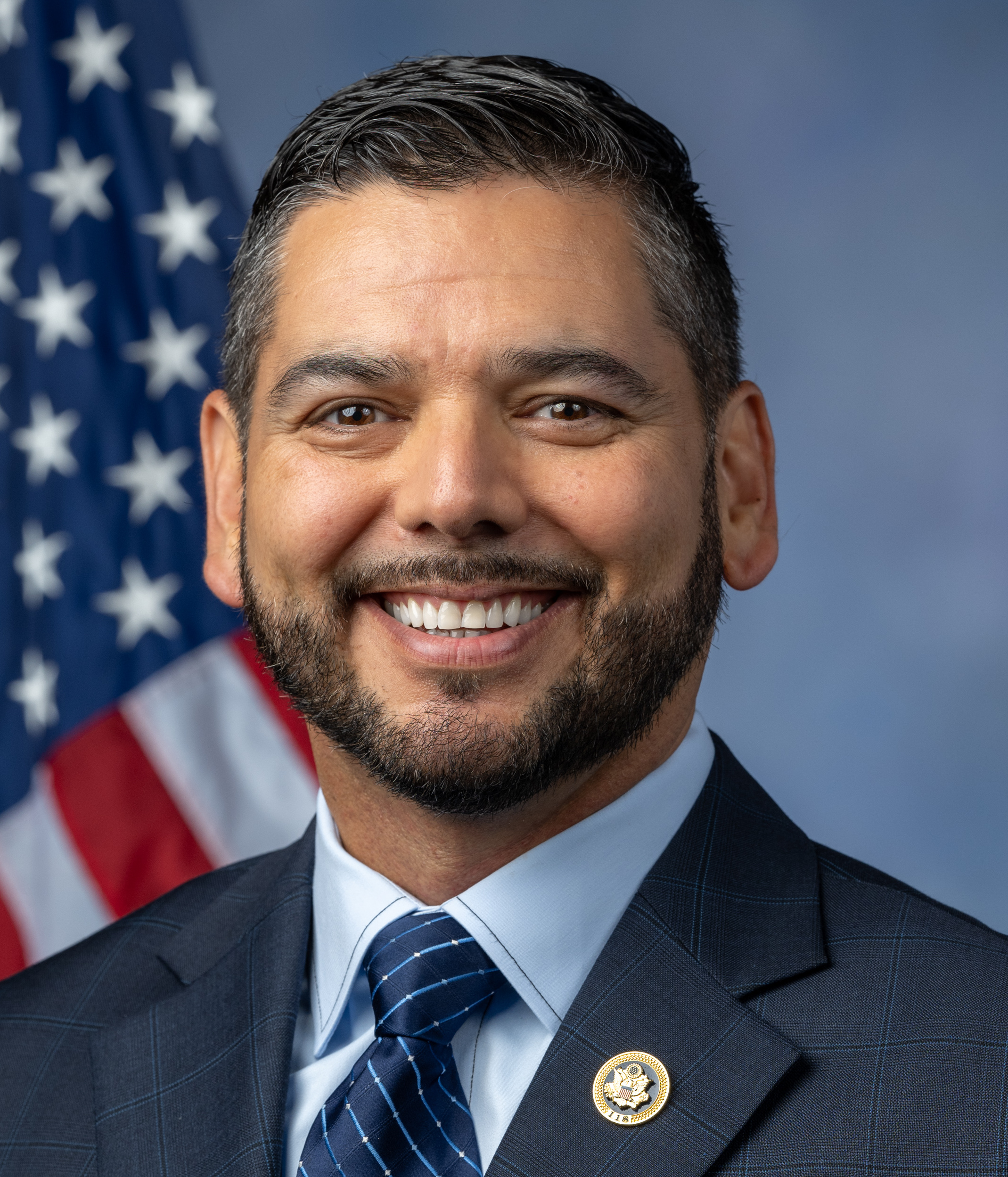

Candidate	Raul Ruiz	Ian Weeks
Party	Democratic	Republican
Popular vote	137,837	107,194
Percentage	56.3%	43.7%
- County results Ruiz: 50–60% Weeks: 60–70%
U.S. Representative before election
Raul Ruiz
Democratic
Elected U.S. Representative
Raul Ruiz
Democratic

The incumbent was Democrat Raul Ruiz, who had represented the district since 2013 and was re-elected with 57.4% of the vote in 2022.

=== Candidates ===
Advanced to general

- Raul Ruiz (Democratic), incumbent U.S. representative
- Ian Weeks (Republican), financial planner

Eliminated in primary

- Ryan Dean Burkett (no party preference), retail worker
- Miguel Chapa (Republican), mortgage broker
- Oscar Ortiz (Democratic), Indio city councilor
- Ceci Truman (Republican), businesswoman and candidate for this district in 2022

=== Endorsements ===
Miguel Chapa (R)

Local officials

- Carl DeMaio, former San Diego city councilor (2008–2012)

Organizations

- California College Republicans
- California Rifle and Pistol Association (co-endorsement with Truman)
Raul Ruiz (D)

Political parties

- California Democratic Party

Organizations

- AIPAC
- California Environmental Voters
- California Young Democrats
- Desert Stonewall Democrats
- Equality California
- Feminist Majority PAC
- Humane Society Legislative Fund
- J Street PAC
- Joint Action Committee for Political Affairs
- League of Conservation Voters
- Planned Parenthood Action Fund (post-primary)

Labor unions

- AFSCME California
- California Federation of Labor
- California Federation of Teachers
- California Professional Firefighters
- California Teachers Association
- IBEW Local 1245
- National Education Association
- National Union of Healthcare Workers
- San Diego & Imperial Counties AFL-CIO
- United Auto Workers
Ceci Truman (R)

Organizations

- California Rifle and Pistol Association (co-endorsement with Chapa)
Ian Weeks (R)

Political parties

- California Republican Party

=== Fundraising ===
Campaign finance reports as of February 14, 2024
Candidate	Raised	Spent	Cash on hand
Oscar Ortiz (D)	$32,022 (Note: $5,000 of this total was self-funded by Ortiz.)	$22,101	$10,140
Raul Ruiz (D)	$1,293,842	$887,745	$1,992,893
Miguel Chapa (R)	$9,370 (Note: $800 of this total was self-funded by Chapa.)	$3,095	$1,909
Ceci Truman (R)	$112,573	$84,004	$28,569
Ian Weeks (R)	$75,140	$59,370	$15,770
Source: Federal Election Commission

=== Predictions ===
Source	Ranking	As of
The Cook Political Report	Solid D	February 2, 2023
Inside Elections	Solid D	March 10, 2023
Sabato's Crystal Ball	Safe D	February 23, 2023
Elections Daily	Safe D	February 5, 2024
CNalysis	Solid D	November 16, 2023

=== Results ===
California's 25th congressional district, 2024
Primary election
Party	Candidate	Votes	%
Democratic	Raul Ruiz (incumbent)	45,882	45.1
Republican	Ian Weeks	20,992	20.6
Republican	Ceci Truman	17,815	17.5
Democratic	Oscar Ortiz	10,171	10.0
Republican	Miguel Chapa	5,856	5.7
No party preference	Ryan Dean Burkett	1,129	1.1
Total votes		101,845	100.0
General election
Democratic	Raul Ruiz (incumbent)	137,837	56.3
Republican	Ian Weeks	107,194	43.7
Total votes		245,031	100.0
Democratic hold			

==== By county ====
County	Raul Ruiz Democratic		Ian Weeks Republican		Margin		Total votes cast
County	#	%	#	%	#	%	Total votes cast
Imperial	29,554	56.12%	23,105	43.88%	6,449	12.25%	52,659
Riverside (part)	107,574	56.45%	82,998	43.55%	24,576	12.90%	190,572
San Bernardino (part)	709	39.39%	1,091	60.61%	−382	−21.22%	1,800
Totals	137,837	56.25%	107,194	43.75%	30,643	12.51%	245,031

== District 26 ==
2024 California's 26th congressional district election
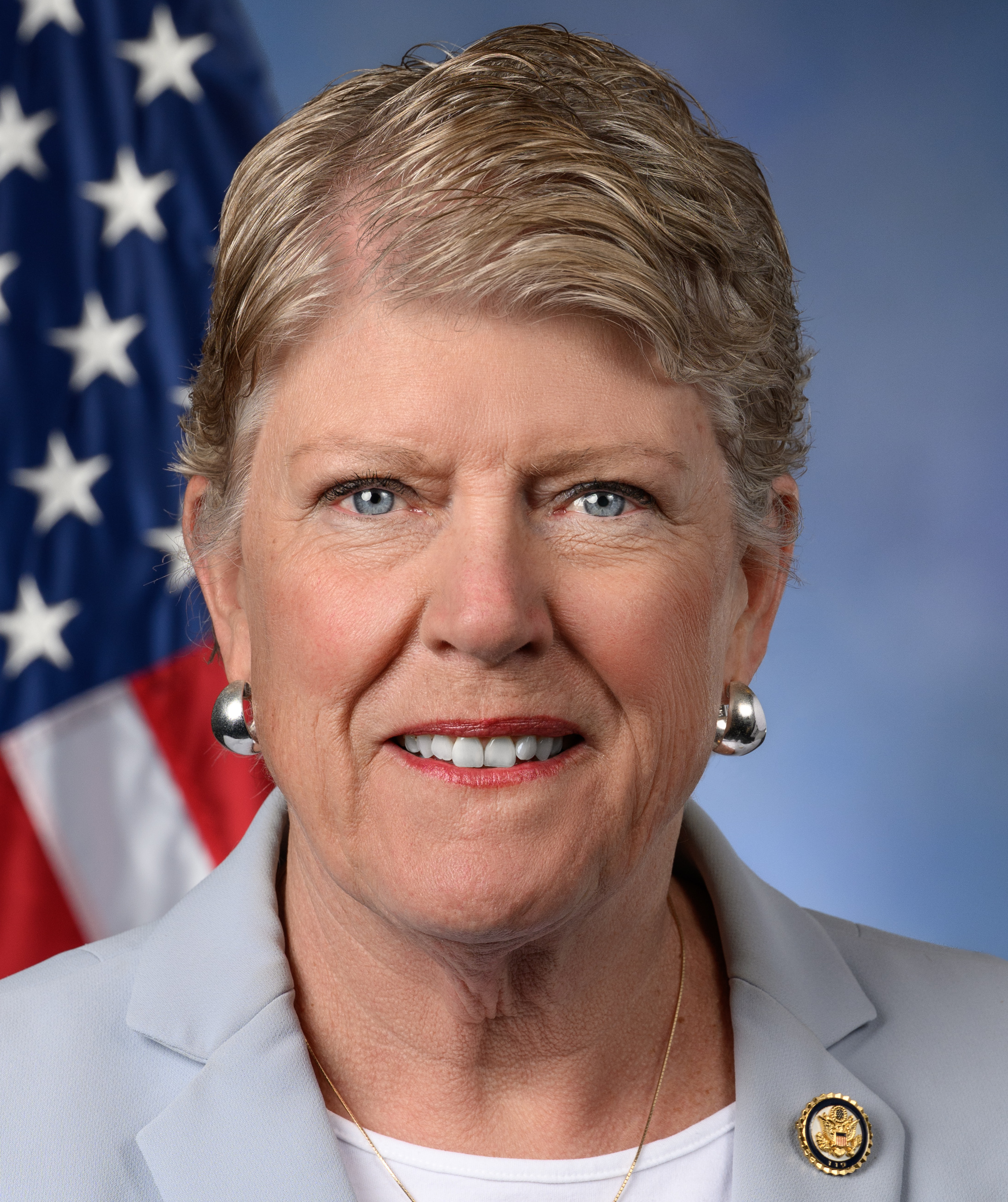

Candidate	Julia Brownley	Michael Koslow
Party	Democratic	Republican
Popular vote	187,393	146,913
Percentage	56.1%	43.9%
- County results Brownley: 50–60%
U.S. Representative before election
Julia Brownley
Democratic
Elected U.S. Representative
Julia Brownley
Democratic

The incumbent was Democrat Julia Brownley, who had represented the district since 2013 and was re-elected with 54.5% of the vote in 2022.

=== Candidates ===
Advanced to general

- Julia Brownley (Democratic), incumbent U.S. representative
- Michael Koslow (Republican), healthcare investigator and retired Department of Defense special agent

Eliminated in primary

- Chris Anstead (Democratic), Agoura Hills city councilor
- Bruce Boyer (Republican), businessman, dancer, and perennial candidate

=== Endorsements ===
Bruce Boyer (R)

Organizations

- California Rifle and Pistol Association (switched endorsement to Koslow post-primary)
Julia Brownley (D)

Political parties

- California Democratic Party
- Los Angeles Democratic Party

Organizations

- AIPAC
- California Environmental Voters
- California Young Democrats
- Equality California
- Feminist Majority PAC
- Humane Society Legislative Fund
- J Street PAC
- Joint Action Committee for Political Affairs
- League of Conservation Voters
- National Women's Political Caucus
- Planned Parenthood Action Fund

Labor unions

- AFSCME California
- Association of Flight Attendants
- California Federation of Labor
- California Federation of Teachers
- California Professional Firefighters
- California Teachers Association
- IBEW Locals 11 and 1245
- International Brotherhood of Teamsters Joint Council 42
- National Education Association
- National Union of Healthcare Workers
- SEIU United Healthcare Workers West
- United Farm Workers
Michael Koslow (R)

State officials

- Mike Huckabee, governor of Arkansas (1996–2007)

Local officials

- Carl DeMaio, former San Diego city councilor (2008–2012)

Organizations

- California College Republicans
- California ProLife Council
- California Republican Assembly
- California Rifle and Pistol Association (post-primary)
- Howard Jarvis Taxpayers Association PAC

Political parties

- California Republican Party

=== Fundraising ===
Campaign finance reports as of February 14, 2024
Candidate	Raised	Spent	Cash on hand
Chris Anstead (D)	$41,697 (Note: $30,000 of this total was self-funded by Anstead.)	$17,704	$23,993
Julia Brownley (D)	$879,078	$465,567	$762,703
Michael Koslow (R)	$39,066 (Note: $5,000 of this total was self-funded by Koslow.)	$34,563	$4,503
Source: Federal Election Commission

=== Predictions ===
Source	Ranking	As of
The Cook Political Report	Solid D	February 2, 2023
Inside Elections	Solid D	March 10, 2023
Sabato's Crystal Ball	Safe D	February 23, 2023
Elections Daily	Safe D	February 5, 2024
CNalysis	Solid D	November 16, 2023

=== Results ===
California's 26th congressional district, 2024
Primary election
Party	Candidate	Votes	%
Democratic	Julia Brownley (incumbent)	84,997	51.4
Republican	Michael Koslow	55,908	33.8
Republican	Bruce Boyer	17,707	10.7
Democratic	Chris Anstead	6,841	4.1
Total votes		165,453	100.0
General election
Democratic	Julia Brownley (incumbent)	187,393	56.1
Republican	Michael Koslow	146,913	43.9
Total votes		334,306	100.0
Democratic hold			

==== By county ====
County	Julia Brownley Democratic		Michael Koslow Republican		Margin		Total votes cast
County	#	%	#	%	#	%	Total votes cast
Los Angeles (part)	15,629	56.64%	11,966	43.36%	3,663	13.27%	27,595
Ventura (part)	171,764	56.00%	134,947	44.00%	36,817	12.00%	306,711
Totals	187,393	56.05%	146,913	43.95%	40,480	12.11%	334,306

== District 27 ==
2024 California's 27th congressional district election
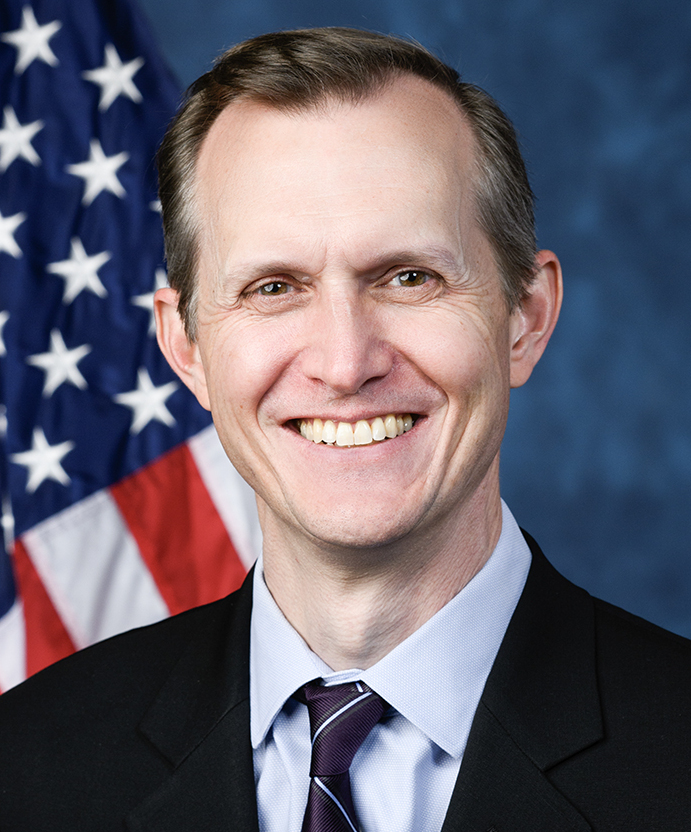

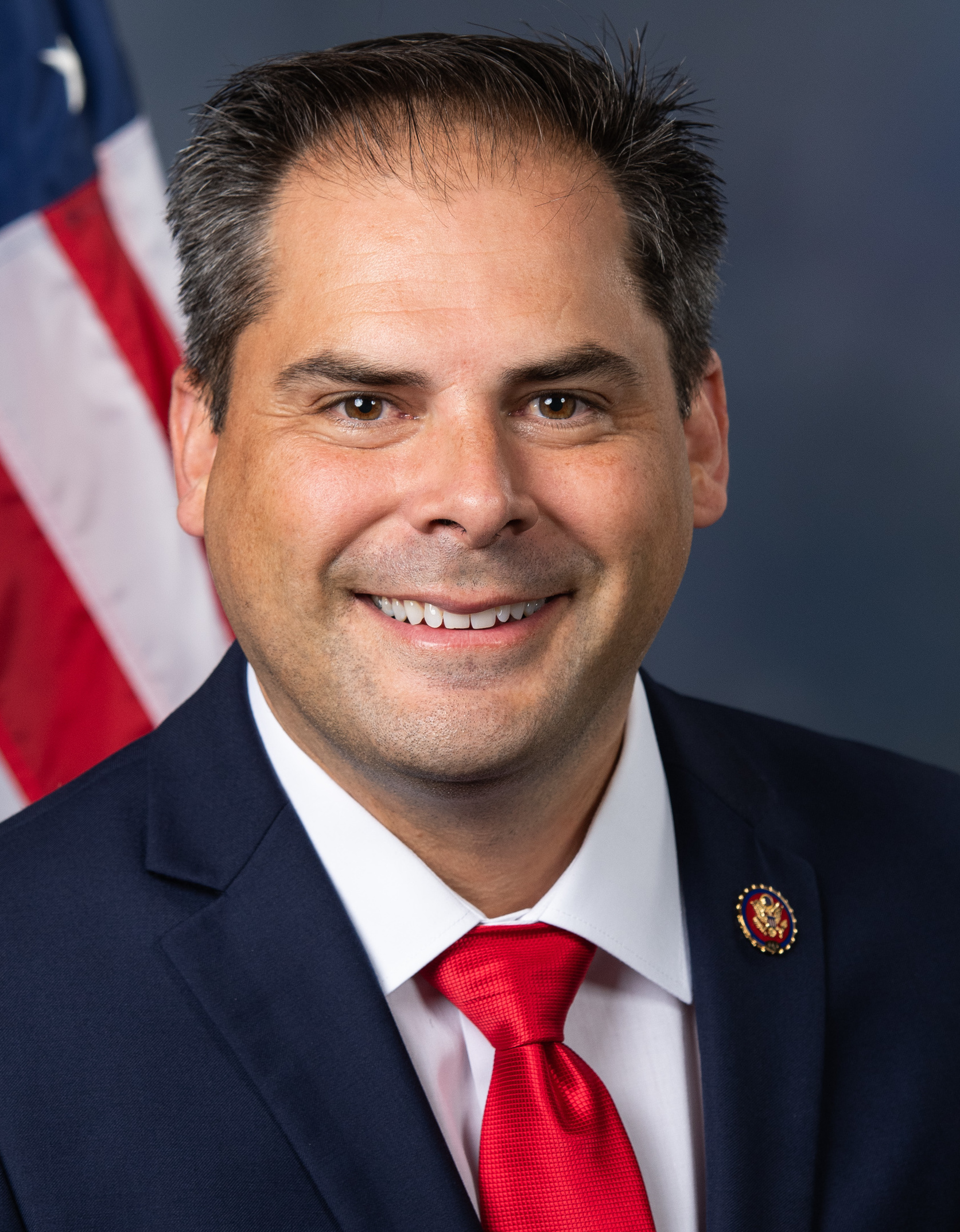
Candidate	George Whitesides	Mike Garcia
Party	Democratic	Republican
Popular vote	154,040	146,050
Percentage	51.3%	48.7%
- County results Whitesides: 50–60%
U.S. Representative before election
Mike Garcia
Republican
Elected U.S. Representative
George Whitesides
Democratic

The incumbent was Republican Mike Garcia, who was re-elected with 53.2% of the vote in 2022.

=== Candidates ===
Advanced to general

- Mike Garcia (Republican), incumbent U.S. representative
- George Whitesides (Democratic), former NASA chief of staff and former CEO of Virgin Galactic

Eliminated in primary

- Steve Hill (Democratic), appraiser and perennial candidate

Withdrawn

- Franky Carrillo (Democratic), member of the Los Angeles County Probation Oversight Commission (ran for state assembly, endorsed Whitesides)

=== Endorsements ===
Mike Garcia (R)

State officials

- Mike Huckabee, governor of Arkansas (1996–2007)

Local officials

- Carl DeMaio, former San Diego city councilor (2008–2012)

Political parties

- American Independent Party
- California Republican Party
- Los Angeles County Republican Party

Newspapers

- Los Angeles Daily News
- Santa Clarita Valley Signal

Organizations

- AIPAC
- California College Republicans
- California ProLife Council
- California Rifle and Pistol Association
- Humane Society Legislative Fund
- Log Cabin Republicans PAC (post-primary)
- National Rifle Association Political Victory Fund
- Republican Jewish Coalition
- Santa Clarita Valley Chamber of Commerce
George Whitesides (D)

U.S. representatives

- Ami Bera, CA-6 (2013–present)
- Gabby Giffords, U.S. representative from Arizona's 8th congressional district (2007–2012)
- Josh Harder, CA-9 (2019–present)
- Hakeem Jeffries, House Minority Leader (2023–present) from NY-08 (2013–present)
- Seth Moulton, MA-06 (2015–present)
- Nancy Pelosi, CA-11 (1987–present) and former Speaker of the House (2007–2011, 2019–2023)
- Adam Schiff, CA-30 (2001–present)

State assemblymembers

- Juan Carrillo, 39th district (2022–present)
- Pilar Schiavo, 40th district (2022–present)
- Christy Smith, 38th district (2018–2020) and runner-up for this district in 2020 and 2022

Local officials

- Franky Carrillo, member of the Los Angeles County Probation Oversight Commission

Political parties

- California Democratic Party
- Los Angeles County Democratic Party

Organizations

- 314 Action
- California Environmental Voters
- California Young Democrats
- DCCC Red to Blue
- Equality California
- Everytown for Gun Safety
- Feminist Majority PAC
- Giffords
- League of Conservation Voters
- Natural Resources Defense Council (post-primary)
- New Dem Action Fund
- Planned Parenthood Action Fund
- Reproductive Freedom for All
- Sierra Club
- Stonewall Democratic Club

Labor unions

- AFSCME California
- California Federation of Labor
- California Federation of Teachers
- California Professional Firefighters
- California Teachers Association
- IBEW Local 11
- International Federation of Professional and Technical Engineers
- Los Angeles County Federation of Labor
- National Education Association
- National Union of Healthcare Workers
- SEIU United Healthcare Workers West
- Service Employees International Union California
- United Association Local 398

=== Fundraising ===
Campaign finance reports as of February 14, 2024
Candidate	Raised	Spent	Cash on hand
Mike Garcia (R)	$3,180,332	$1,736,253	$1,560,751
George Whitesides (D)	$3,578,060 (Note: $1,060,000 of this total was self-funded by Whitesides.)	$1,069,537	$2,508,523
Source: Federal Election Commission

=== Predictions ===
Source	Ranking	As of
The Cook Political Report	Tossup	April 18, 2023
Inside Elections	Tossup	March 10, 2023
Sabato's Crystal Ball	Lean D (flip)	November 4, 2024
Elections Daily	Lean R	November 4, 2024
CNalysis	Tilt D (flip)	November 4, 2024

=== Polling ===
Poll source	Date(s) administered	Sample size	Margin of error	Mike Garcia (R)	George Whitesides (D)	Undecided
USC/CSU	September 14–21, 2024	522 (LV)	± 4.3%	46%	48%	6% (Note: "Won't vote" with 2%)
Impact Research (D) (Note: Poll sponsored by Whitesides's campaign)	April 12–18, 2024	650 (V)	–	44%	47%	9%

=== Results ===
California's 27th congressional district, 2024
Primary election
Party	Candidate	Votes	%
Republican	Mike Garcia (incumbent)	74,245	54.9
Democratic	George Whitesides	44,391	32.8
Democratic	Steve Hill	16,525	12.2
Total votes		135,161	100.0
General election
Democratic	George Whitesides	154,040	51.3
Republican	Mike Garcia (incumbent)	146,050	48.7
Total votes		300,090	100.0
Democratic gain from Republican			

== District 28 ==
2024 California's 28th congressional district election
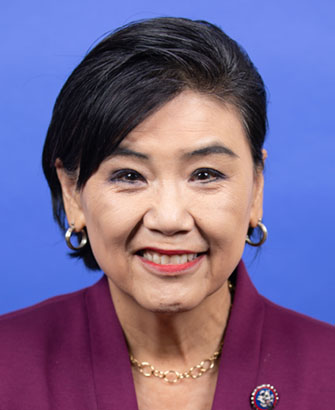

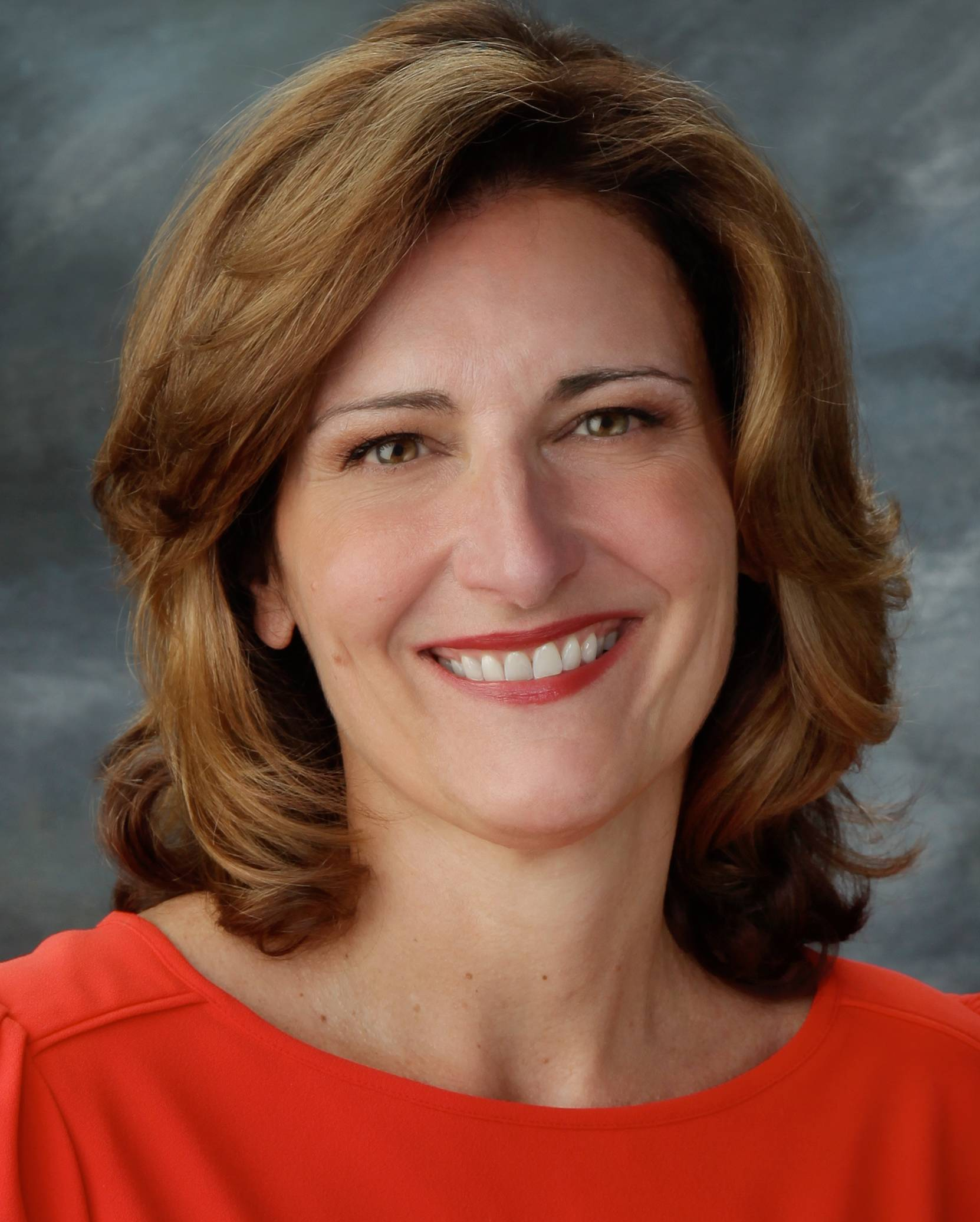
Candidate	Judy Chu	April Verlato
Party	Democratic	Republican
Popular vote	204,489	110,455
Percentage	64.9%	35.1%
- County results Chu: 60–70% Verlato: 50–60%
U.S. Representative before election
Judy Chu
Democratic
Elected U.S. Representative
Judy Chu
Democratic

The incumbent was Democrat Judy Chu, who had represented the district since 2013 and was re-elected with 66.2% of the vote in 2022.

=== Candidates ===
Advanced to general

- Judy Chu (Democratic), incumbent U.S. representative
- April Verlato (Republican), mayor of Arcadia

Eliminated in primary

- Jose Castaneda (Libertarian), customer service representative
- William Patterson (Peace and Freedom), consultant

=== Endorsements ===
Jose Castaneda (L)

Political parties

- California Libertarian Party
Judy Chu (D)

Political parties

- California Democratic Party
- California Young Democrats
- Los Angeles County Democratic Party

Organizations

- Americans for Democratic Action Southern California
- Armenian National Committee of America-Western Region
- California Environmental Voters
- Equality California
- Everytown for Gun Safety Action Fund
- Feminist Majority PAC
- Humane Society Legislative Fund
- J Street PAC
- League of Conservation Voters
- National Women's Political Caucus
- Planned Parenthood Action Fund
- Population Connection Action Fund
- Sierra Club
- Stonewall Democratic Club

Labor unions

- California Federation of Labor
- California Federation of Teachers
- California Professional Firefighters
- California Teachers Association
- IBEW Local 11
- International Brotherhood of Teamsters Joint Council 42
- National Education Association
- National Union of Healthcare Workers
- SEIU United Healthcare Workers West
- Service Employees International Union California
- United Association Local 398
- United Auto Workers
- United Farm Workers
William Patterson (P&F)

Political parties

- Peace and Freedom Party
April Verlato (R)

Local officials

- Carl DeMaio, former San Diego city councilor (2008–2012)

Organizations

- California College Republicans
- California ProLife Council
- California Republican Assembly
- Howard Jarvis Taxpayers Association PAC

Political parties

- California Republican Party
- Los Angeles County Republican Party

=== Fundraising ===
Campaign finance reports as of February 14, 2024
Candidate	Raised	Spent	Cash on hand
Judy Chu (D)	$954,243	$769,610	$3,531,026
April Verlato (R)	$198,176 (Note: $50,000 of this total was self-funded by Verlato.)	$37,739	$160,437
Source: Federal Election Commission

=== Predictions ===
Source	Ranking	As of
The Cook Political Report	Solid D	February 2, 2023
Inside Elections	Solid D	March 10, 2023
Sabato's Crystal Ball	Safe D	February 23, 2023
Elections Daily	Safe D	February 5, 2024
CNalysis	Solid D	November 16, 2023

=== Results ===
California's 28th congressional district, 2024
Primary election
Party	Candidate	Votes	%
Democratic	Judy Chu (incumbent)	99,261	62.7
Republican	April Verlato	52,369	33.1
Peace and Freedom	William Patterson	3,503	2.2
Libertarian	Jose Castaneda	3,156	2.0
Total votes		158,289	100.0
General election
Democratic	Judy Chu (incumbent)	204,489	64.9
Republican	April Verlato	110,455	35.1
Total votes		314,944	100.0
Democratic hold			

==== By county ====
County	Judy Chu Democratic		April Verlato Republican		Margin		Total votes cast
County	#	%	#	%	#	%	Total votes cast
Los Angeles (part)	187,612	68.36%	86,833	31.64%	100,779	36.72%	274,445
San Bernardino (part)	16,877	41.67%	23,622	58.33%	−6,745	−16.65%	40,499
Totals	204,489	64.93%	110,455	35.07%	94,034	29.86%	314,944

== District 29 ==
2024 California's 29th congressional district election
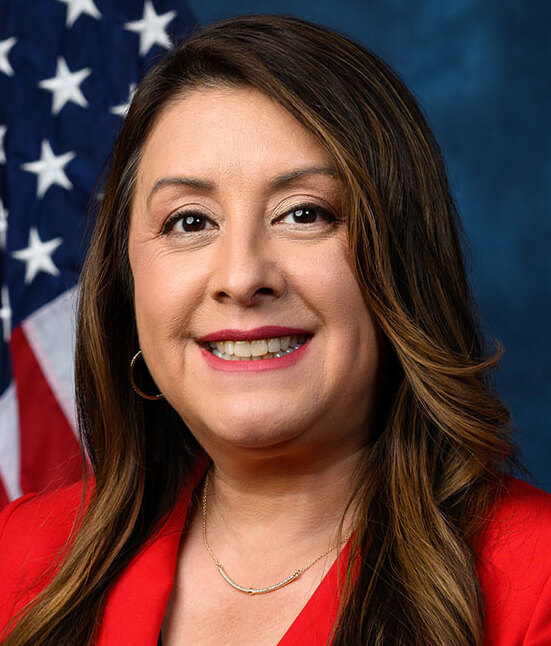

Candidate	Luz Rivas	Benito Bernal
Party	Democratic	Republican
Popular vote	146,312	63,374
Percentage	69.8%	30.2%
- County results Maria Rivas: 60–70%
U.S. Representative before election
Tony Cárdenas
Democratic
Elected U.S. Representative
Luz Rivas
Democratic

The incumbent was Democrat Tony Cárdenas, who had represented the district since 2013 and was re-elected with 58.5% of the vote in 2022, running against another Democrat. On November 20, 2023, he announced that he would not seek re-election in 2024.

=== Candidates ===
Advanced to general

- Benito Bernal (Republican), youth advocate, perennial candidate, and runner-up for this district in 2018
- Luz Rivas (Democratic), state assemblywoman from the 43rd district (2018–present)

Eliminated in primary

- Angelica Dueñas (Democratic), former president of the Sun Valley neighborhood council and runner-up for this district in 2020 and 2022

Declined

- Tony Cárdenas (Democratic), incumbent U.S. representative (endorsed Rivas)

=== Endorsements ===
Benito Bernal (R)

Local officials

- Carl DeMaio, former San Diego city councilor (2008–2012)

Organizations

- California College Republicans
- California ProLife Council
- California Republican Assembly
- California Rifle and Pistol Association (post-primary)

Political parties

- American Independent Party
- California Republican Party
Angelica Dueñas (D)

Local officials

- Kenneth Mejia, Los Angeles City Controller

Individuals

- Howie Klein, former president of Reprise Records (1989–2001) and adjunct professor at McGill University
- Heather Digby Parton, political blogger

Organizations

- Americans for Democratic Action Southern California
- Vote Common Good
Luz Rivas (D)

U.S. senators

- Alex Padilla, U.S. senator from California

U.S. representatives

- Tony Cárdenas, incumbent U.S. representative
- Lois Frankel, U.S. Representative from Florida (2013–present)

Organizations

- AIPAC
- California Environmental Voters
- Center for Biological Diversity Action Fund
- CHC BOLD PAC
- Congressional Progressive Caucus PAC
- Democratic Majority for Israel
- EMILY's List
- Equality California
- Everytown for Gun Safety (post-primary)
- Food & Water Action
- Friends of the Earth Action
- Latino Victory Fund
- League of Conservation Voters
- National Women's Political Caucus
- Planned Parenthood Action Fund (post-primary)
- PODER PAC
- Reproductive Freedom for All (post-primary)
- Sierra Club

Labor unions

- California Federation of Labor
- California Federation of Teachers
- California Professional Firefighters
- California Teachers Association
- IBEW Local 11
- National Education Association
- National Nurses United
- United Association Local 398
Tony Cárdenas (declined)

Political parties

- California Democratic Party

Organizations

- AIPAC
- Equality California

Labor unions

- International Brotherhood of Teamsters Joint Council 42
- National Education Association

=== Fundraising ===
Campaign finance reports as of February 14, 2024
Candidate	Raised	Spent	Cash on hand
Angelica Dueñas (D)	$83,650	$76,853	$12,631
Luz Rivas (D)	$344,596	$191,449	$136,748
Benito Bernal (R)	$27,326 (Note: $10,000 of this total was self-funded by Bernal.)	$10,352	$1,542
Source: Federal Election Commission

=== Predictions ===
Source	Ranking	As of
The Cook Political Report	Solid D	February 2, 2023
Inside Elections	Solid D	March 10, 2023
Sabato's Crystal Ball	Safe D	February 23, 2023
Elections Daily	Safe D	February 5, 2024
CNalysis	Solid D	November 16, 2023

=== Results ===
California's 29th congressional district, 2024
Primary election
Party	Candidate	Votes	%
Democratic	Luz Rivas	40,096	49.3
Republican	Benito Bernal	21,446	26.4
Democratic	Angelica Dueñas	19,844	24.4
Total votes		81,386	100.0
General election
Democratic	Luz Rivas	146,312	69.8
Republican	Benito Bernal	63,374	30.2
Total votes		209,686	100.0
Democratic hold			

==== By county ====
County	Luz Rivas Democratic		Benito Bernal Republican		Margin		Total votes cast
County	#	%	#	%	#	%	Total votes cast
Los Angeles (part)	146,312	69.78%	63,374	30.22%	82,938	39.55%	209,686
Totals	146,312	69.78%	63,374	30.22%	82,938	39.55%	209,686

== District 30 ==
2024 California's 30th congressional district election
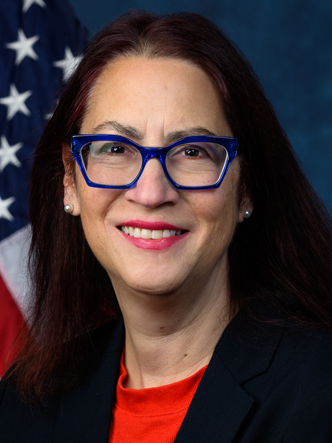

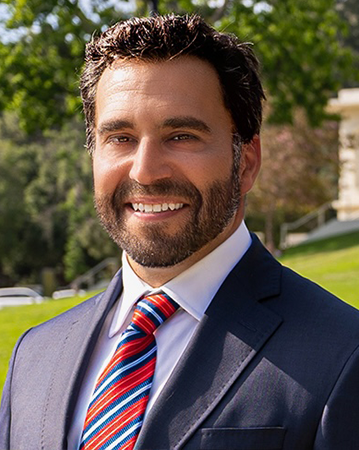
Candidate	Laura Friedman	Alex Balekian
Party	Democratic	Republican
Popular vote	213,100	98,559
Percentage	68.4%	31.6%
- County results Friedman: 60–70%
U.S. Representative before election
Adam Schiff
Democratic
Elected U.S. Representative
Laura Friedman
Democratic

The incumbent was Democrat Adam Schiff, who was re-elected with 71.1% of the vote in 2022, running against another Democrat. He did not seek re-election, instead choosing to run for the U.S. Senate.

=== Candidates ===
Advanced to general

- Alex Balekian (Republican), physician
- Laura Friedman (Democratic), state assemblywoman from the 43rd district

Eliminated in primary

- Francisco Arreaga (Democratic), former policy advisor to U.S. Representative Dan Goldman
- Joshua Bocanegra (no party preference), software developer
- Steve Dunwoody (Democratic), government affairs executive and former special assistant to the U.S. deputy secretary of energy
- Mike Feuer (Democratic), former Los Angeles city attorney
- Sal Genovese, community services director and perennial candidate
- Maebe A. Girl (Democratic), Silver Lake neighborhood council board member and runner-up for this district in 2022
- Emilio Martinez (Republican), television producer
- Nick Melvoin (Democratic), member of the Los Angeles Board of Education
- Courtney Najera (Democratic), beautician
- Anthony Portantino (Democratic), state senator from the 25th district
- Jirair Ratevosian (Democratic), former senior advisor at the U.S. Department of State and former legislative director for U.S. Representative Barbara Lee
- Ben Savage (Democratic), actor known for Boy Meets World
- Sepi Shyne (Democratic), mayor of West Hollywood

=== Predictions ===
Source	Ranking	As of
The Cook Political Report	Solid D	February 2, 2023
Inside Elections	Solid D	March 10, 2023
Sabato's Crystal Ball	Safe D	February 23, 2023
Elections Daily	Safe D	February 5, 2024
CNalysis	Solid D	November 16, 2023

=== Results ===
California's 30th congressional district, 2024
Primary election
Party	Candidate	Votes	%
Democratic	Laura Friedman	46,329	30.1
Republican	Alex Balekian	26,826	17.4
Democratic	Anthony Portantino	20,459	13.3
Democratic	Mike Feuer	18,878	12.3
Democratic	Maebe A. Girl	15,791	10.3
Republican	Emilio Martinez	6,775	4.4
Democratic	Ben Savage	6,147	4.0
Democratic	Nick Melvoin	4,134	2.7
Democratic	Jirair Ratevosian	2,889	1.9
Democratic	Sepi Shyne	2,126	1.4
Democratic	Courtney Simone Najera	1,167	0.8
No party preference	Joshua Bocanegra	780	0.5
Democratic	Steve Dunwoody	727	0.5
Democratic	Francisco Arreaga	532	0.3
Democratic	Sal Genovese	442	0.3
Total votes		154,002	100.0
General election
Democratic	Laura Friedman	213,100	68.4
Republican	Alex Balekian	98,559	31.6
Total votes		311,659	100.0
Democratic hold			

== District 31 ==
2024 California's 31st congressional district election
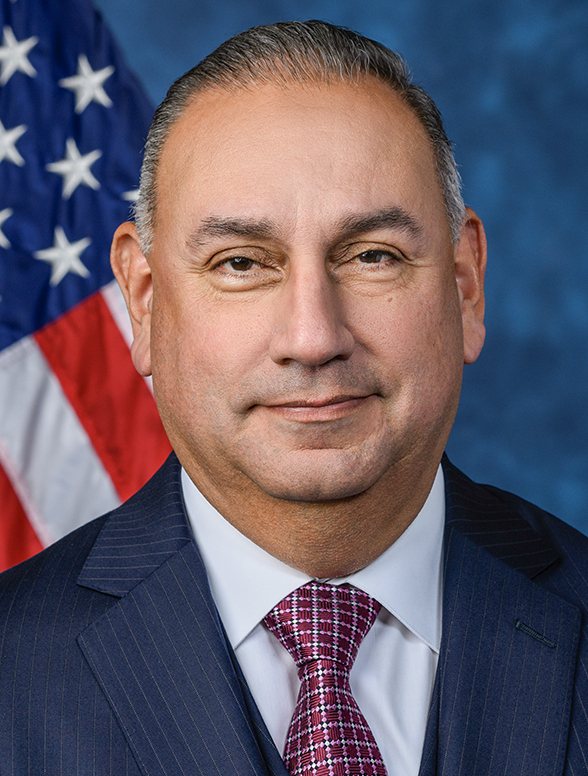

Candidate	Gil Cisneros	Daniel Martinez
Party	Democratic	Republican
Popular vote	148,095	99,856
Percentage	59.7%	40.3%
- County results Cisneros: 50–60%
U.S. Representative before election
Grace Napolitano
Democratic
Elected U.S. Representative
Gil Cisneros
Democratic

The incumbent was Democrat Grace Napolitano, who was re-elected with 59.5% of the vote in 2022. Napolitano decided to retire rather than seek re-election.

=== Candidates ===
Advanced to general

- Gil Cisneros (Democratic), former U.S. Under Secretary of Defense for Personnel and Readiness (2021–2023) and former U.S. Representative from the 39th district (2019–2021)
- Daniel Martinez (Republican), attorney and runner-up for this district in 2022

Eliminated in primary

- Bob Archuleta (Democratic), state senator from the 30th district (2018–present)
- Pedro Casas (Republican), clinical psychologist
- Greg Hafif (Democratic), attorney
- Kurt Jose (Democratic), businessman
- Erskine Levi (American Solidarity Party), (Note: Levi is a member of the American Solidarity Party, but ran as No Party Preference because the American Solidarity Party does not currently have ballot access in California.) teacher
- Mary Ann Lutz (Democratic), president of the Citrus College Board of Trustees, former mayor of Monrovia, and former policy advisor to incumbent Grace Napolitano
- Marie Manvel (no party preference), former member of the Santa Monica Social Services Commission and runner-up for State Board of Equalization District 3 in 2022
- Susan Rubio (Democratic), state senator from the 22nd district (2018–present)

Declined

- Grace Napolitano (Democratic), incumbent U.S. representative (endorsed Archuleta)

=== Endorsements ===
Bob Archuleta (D)

U.S. representatives

- Grace Napolitano, U.S. representative from California's 31st congressional district (1999–present)

Statewide officials

- Fiona Ma, California State Treasurer (2019–present)

Labor unions

- IBEW Local 11
- International Brotherhood of Teamsters Joint Council 42
- Service Employees International Union California (co-endorsement with Cisneros)
Pedro Casas (R)

Local officials

- Carl DeMaio, former San Diego city councilor (2008–2012)

Organizations

- California College Republicans
- California ProLife Council
- California Rifle and Pistol Association

Political parties

- California Republican Party
Gil Cisneros (D)

U.S. representatives

- Pete Aguilar, California's 33rd congressional district (2015–present)
- Nanette Barragán, California's 44th congressional district (2017–present)
- Salud Carbajal, California's 24th congressional district (2017–present)
- Tony Cárdenas, California's 29th congressional district (2013–present)
- Judy Chu, California's 28th congressional district (2009–present)
- Jim Costa, California's 21st congressional district (2005–present)
- John Garamendi, California's 8th congressional district (2009–present)
- Robert Garcia, California's 42nd congressional district (2023–present)
- Gabby Giffords, Arizona's 8th congressional district (2007–2012)
- Josh Harder, California's 9th congressional district (2019–present)
- Mike Levin, California's 49th congressional district (2019–present)
- Grace Meng, NY-9 (2013–present)
- Nancy Pelosi, Speaker Emerita (2007–2011, 2019–2023) from CA-11 (1987–present)
- Katie Porter, California's 47th congressional district (2019–present)
- Raul Ruiz, California's 25th congressional district (2013–present)
- Linda Sánchez, California's 38th congressional district (2003–present)
- Mark Takano, California's 39th congressional district (2013–present)
- Mike Thompson, California's 4th congressional district (1999–present)

Municipal officials

- Hilda Solis, Los Angeles County supervisor from the 1st district (2014–present), former U.S. Secretary of Labor (2009–2013), and former U.S. representative from California's 32nd congressional district (2001–2009)

Local officials

- Fidel Vargas, former mayor of Baldwin Park (1992–1997)

Labor unions

- International Association of Sheet Metal, Air, Rail and Transportation Workers
- International Union of Operating Engineers Local 12
- International Union of Painters and Allied Trades District Council 36
- Service Employees International Union California (co-endorsement with Archuleta)

Organizations

- AIPAC
- ASPIRE PAC
- California Environmental Voters
- CHC BOLD PAC
- Democratic Majority for Israel (post-primary)
- Everytown for Gun Safety (post-primary)
- Giffords
- League of Conservation Voters
- New Democrat Coalition Action Fund
- Planned Parenthood Action Fund (post-primary)
- Pro-Israel America
- Reproductive Freedom for All (post-primary)
- With Honor Fund
Mary Ann Lutz (D)

Organizations

- National Organization for Women PAC
- National Women's Political Caucus (co-endorsement with Rubio)
- Vote Common Good

Labor unions

- United Association Local 398
Susan Rubio (D)

Organizations

- National Women's Political Caucus (co-endorsement with Lutz)
- PODER PAC

Labor unions

- California Teachers Association
- National Education Association
- National Union of Healthcare Workers
Grace Napolitano (D) (declined)

Organizations

- American Israel Public Affairs Committee (AIPAC)
- Feminist Majority PAC
Declined to endorse

Political parties

- California Democratic Party

Labor unions

- California Federation of Labor

=== Fundraising ===
Campaign finance reports as of February 14, 2024
Candidate	Raised	Spent	Cash on hand
Bob Archuleta (D)	$513,580 (Note: $225,000 of this total was self-funded by Archuleta.)	$494,266	$19,314
Gil Cisneros (D)	$4,641,856 (Note: $4,350,000 of this total was self-funded by Cisneros.)	$4,534,715	$107,140
Greg Hafif (D)	$826,060 (Note: $600,000 of this total was self-funded by Hafif.)	$555,576	$270,483
Mary Ann Lutz (D)	$625,215 (Note: $505,000 of this total was self-funded by Lutz.)	$373,697	$251,517
Susan Rubio (D)	$554,685	$396,341	$158,343
Source: Federal Election Commission

=== Polling ===
Poll source	Date(s) administered	Sample size	Margin of error	Bob Archuleta (D)	Pedro Casas (R)	Gil Cisneros (D)	Greg Hafif (D)	Mary Ann Lutz (D)	Daniel Martinez (R)	Susan Rubio (D)	Other	Undecided
Tulchin Research (D) (Note: Poll sponsored by Cisneros's campaign)	December 14–19, 2023	600 (LV)	± 4.0%	4%	4%	27%	3%	2%	10%	12%	9% (Note: Elvira Moreno (R) with 6%; Erskine Levi (NPP) with 2%; Marie Manvel (NPP) with 1%; Kurt Jose (D) with 0%)	28%

=== Predictions ===
Source	Ranking	As of
Cook Political Report	Solid D	February 2, 2023
Inside Elections	Solid D	March 10, 2023
Sabato's Crystal Ball	Safe D	February 23, 2023
Elections Daily	Safe D	February 5, 2024
CNalysis	Solid D	November 16, 2023

=== Results ===
California's 31st congressional district, 2024
Primary election
Party	Candidate	Votes	%
Democratic	Gil Cisneros	23,888	23.6
Republican	Daniel Martinez	19,464	19.2
Republican	Pedro Casas	17,077	16.9
Democratic	Susan Rubio	16,006	15.8
Democratic	Bob Archuleta	10,151	10.0
Democratic	Mary Ann Lutz	6,629	6.5
Democratic	Greg Hafif	4,914	4.9
Democratic	Kurt Jose	1,415	1.4
No party preference	Erskine Levi	1,166	1.2
No party preference	Marie Manvel	534	0.5
Total votes		101,244	100.0
General election
Democratic	Gil Cisneros	148,095	59.7
Republican	Daniel Martinez	99,856	40.3
Total votes		247,951	100.0
Democratic hold			

== District 32 ==
2024 California's 32nd congressional district election
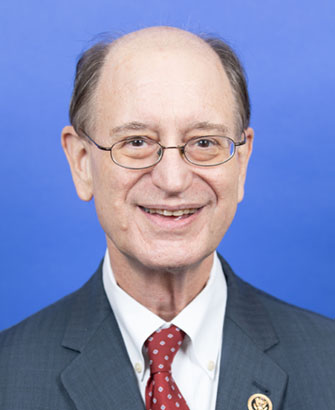

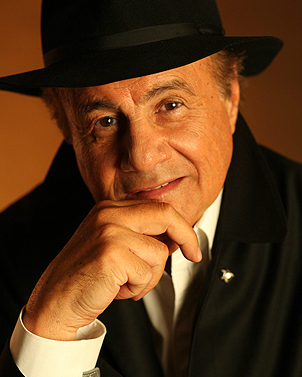
Candidate	Brad Sherman	Larry Thompson
Party	Democratic	Republican
Popular vote	212,934	108,711
Percentage	66.2%	33.8%
- County results Sherman: 50–60% 60–70%
U.S. Representative before election
Brad Sherman
Democratic
Elected U.S. Representative
Brad Sherman
Democratic

The incumbent was Democrat Brad Sherman, who had represented the district since 2013 and was re-elected with 69.2% of the vote in 2022.

=== Candidates ===
Advanced to general

- Brad Sherman (Democratic), incumbent U.S. representative
- Larry Thompson (Republican), attorney and independent candidate for the 37th district in 2020

Eliminated in primary

- Dave Abbitt (Democratic), digital media producer
- Christopher Ahuja (Democratic), talent agent
- James Shuster (Republican), retired businessman
- Douglas Smith (Democratic), stage manager

Withdrawn

- Trevor Witt (Democratic), driver

=== Endorsements ===
Christopher Ahuja (D)

Organizations

- Americans for Democratic Action Southern California
- Ventura County Young Democrats
Brad Sherman (D)

Local officials

- Dennis Zine, former Los Angeles city councilor from the 3rd district (Independent)

Political parties

- California Democratic Party
- Los Angeles Democratic Party

Organizations

- AIPAC
- Armenian National Committee of America-Western Region
- California Environmental Voters
- California Young Democrats
- Democratic Majority for Israel
- Equality California
- Humane Society Legislative Fund
- Planned Parenthood Action Fund (post-primary)
- Population Connection Action Fund
- Pro-Israel America
- Sierra Club

Labor unions

- AFSCME California
- California Federation of Labor
- California Federation of Teachers
- California Professional Firefighters
- California Teachers Association
- IBEW Local 11
- International Brotherhood of Teamsters Joint Council 42
- National Education Association
- SEIU United Healthcare Workers West
- United Association Local 398
- United Auto Workers
Larry Thompson (R)

Local officials

- Carl DeMaio, former San Diego city councilor (2008–2012)

Organizations

- California College Republicans
- California ProLife Council

Political parties

- American Independent Party
- California Republican Party

Individuals

- Perianne Boring, entrepreneur
- Brock Pierce, cryptocurrency investor, former actor

=== Fundraising ===
Campaign finance reports as of February 14, 2024
Candidate	Raised	Spent	Cash on hand
Dave Abbitt (D)	$2,240	$0	$2,240
Brad Sherman (D)	$984,660	$533,849	$3,419,583
James Shuster (R)	$5,421 (Note: $1,600 of this total was self-funded by Shuster.)	$6,911	$0
Larry Thompson (R)	$71,981	$59,149	$12,831
Source: Federal Election Commission

=== Predictions ===
Source	Ranking	As of
The Cook Political Report	Solid D	February 2, 2023
Inside Elections	Solid D	March 10, 2023
Sabato's Crystal Ball	Safe D	February 23, 2023
Elections Daily	Safe D	February 5, 2024
CNalysis	Solid D	November 16, 2023

=== Results ===
California's 32nd congressional district, 2024
Primary election
Party	Candidate	Votes	%
Democratic	Brad Sherman (incumbent)	91,952	58.6
Republican	Larry Thompson	29,939	19.1
Republican	James Shuster	16,601	10.6
Democratic	Christopher Ahuja	12,637	8.1
Democratic	Douglas Smith	2,504	1.6
Democratic	David Abbitt	1,665	1.1
Democratic	Trevor Witt (withdrawn)	1,635	1.0
Total votes		156,933	100.0
General election
Democratic	Brad Sherman (incumbent)	212,934	66.2
Republican	Larry Thompson	108,711	33.8
Total votes		321,645	100.0
Democratic hold			

==== By county ====
County	Brad Sherman Democratic		Larry Thompson Republican		Margin		Total votes cast
County	#	%	#	%	#	%	Total votes cast
Los Angeles (part)	212,328	66.25%	108,165	33.75%	104,163	32.50%	320,493
Ventura (part)	606	52.60%	546	47.40%	60	5.21%	1,152
Totals	212,934	66.20%	108,711	33.80%	104,223	32.40%	321,645

== District 33 ==
2024 California's 33rd congressional district election
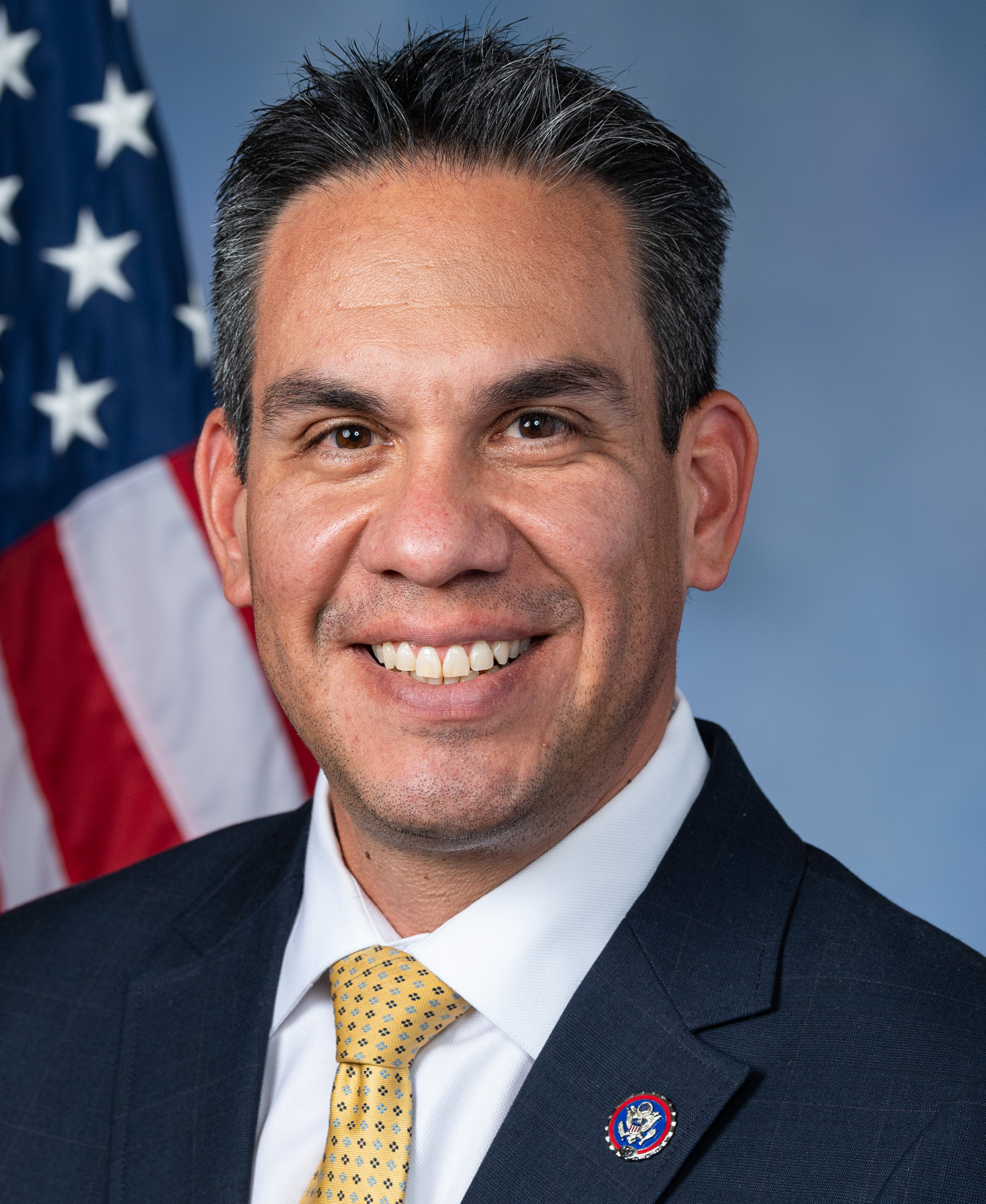

Candidate	Pete Aguilar	Tom Herman
Party	Democratic	Republican
Popular vote	137,197	96,078
Percentage	58.8%	41.2%
- County results Aguilar: 50–60%
U.S. Representative before election
Pete Aguilar
Democratic
Elected U.S. Representative
Pete Aguilar
Democratic

The incumbent was Democrat Pete Aguilar, who had represented the district since 2015 and was re-elected with 61.3% of the vote in 2022.

=== Candidates ===
Advanced to general

- Pete Aguilar (Democratic), incumbent U.S. representative
- Tom Herman (Republican), property manager

Write-in candidates

- John Mark Porter (Republican), disaster response coordinator and runner-up for this district in 2022
- Ernest Richter (Republican), retired businessman and candidate for this district in 2022

Withdrawn

- Sarah Sun Liew (Republican), businesswoman, candidate for this district in 2020, and candidate for U.S. Senate in 2022 (ran for U.S. Senate)

=== Endorsements ===
Pete Aguilar (D)

Political parties

- California Democratic Party

Organizations

- AIPAC
- California Environmental Voters
- California Young Democrats
- Democratic Majority for Israel
- Equality California
- Everytown for Gun Safety Action Fund
- Humane Society Legislative Fund
- J Street PAC
- League of Conservation Voters
- Planned Parenthood Action Fund

Labor unions

- AFSCME California
- California Federation of Labor
- California Federation of Teachers
- California Professional Firefighters
- California Teachers Association
- International Brotherhood of Teamsters Joint Council 42
- National Education Association
- National Union of Healthcare Workers
- United Association Local 398
- United Auto Workers

=== Fundraising ===
Campaign finance reports as of February 14, 2024
Candidate	Raised	Spent	Cash on hand
Pete Aguilar (D)	$3,427,439	$1,993,237	$3,013,958
Tom Herman (R)	$4,692	$2,710	$1,982
Source: Federal Election Commission

=== Predictions ===
Source	Ranking	As of
The Cook Political Report	Solid D	February 2, 2023
Inside Elections	Solid D	March 10, 2023
Sabato's Crystal Ball	Safe D	February 23, 2023
Elections Daily	Safe D	February 5, 2024
CNalysis	Solid D	November 16, 2023

=== Results ===
California's 33rd congressional district, 2024
Primary election
Party	Candidate	Votes	%
Democratic	Pete Aguilar (incumbent)	45,065	57.1
Republican	Tom Herman	33,815	42.8
Republican	John Mark Porter (write-in)	104	0.1
Republican	Ernest Richter (write-in)	3	0.0
Total votes		78,987	100.0
General election
Democratic	Pete Aguilar (incumbent)	137,197	58.8
Republican	Tom Herman	96,078	41.2
Total votes		233,275	100.0
Democratic hold			

== District 34 ==
2024 California's 34th congressional district election
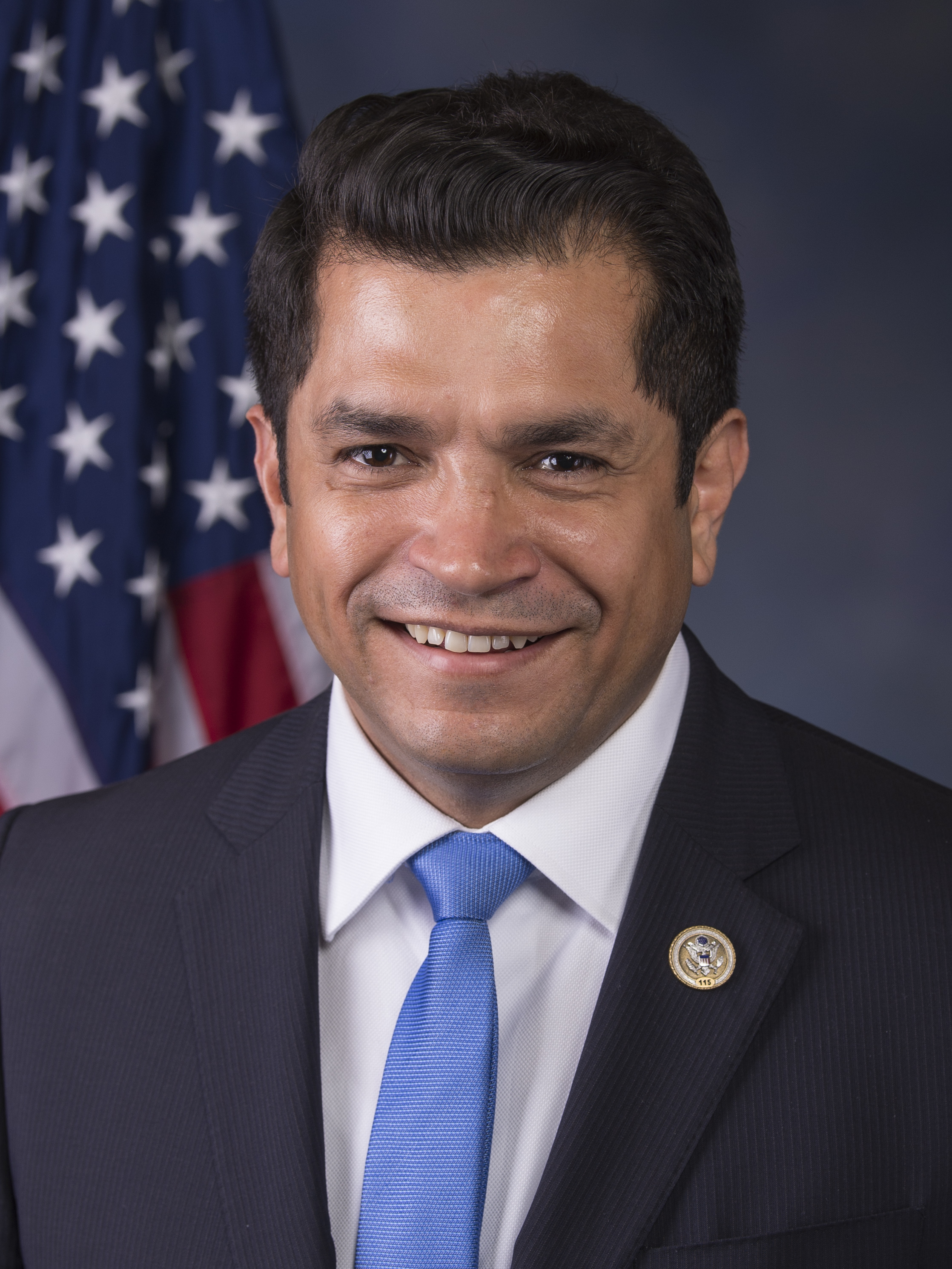

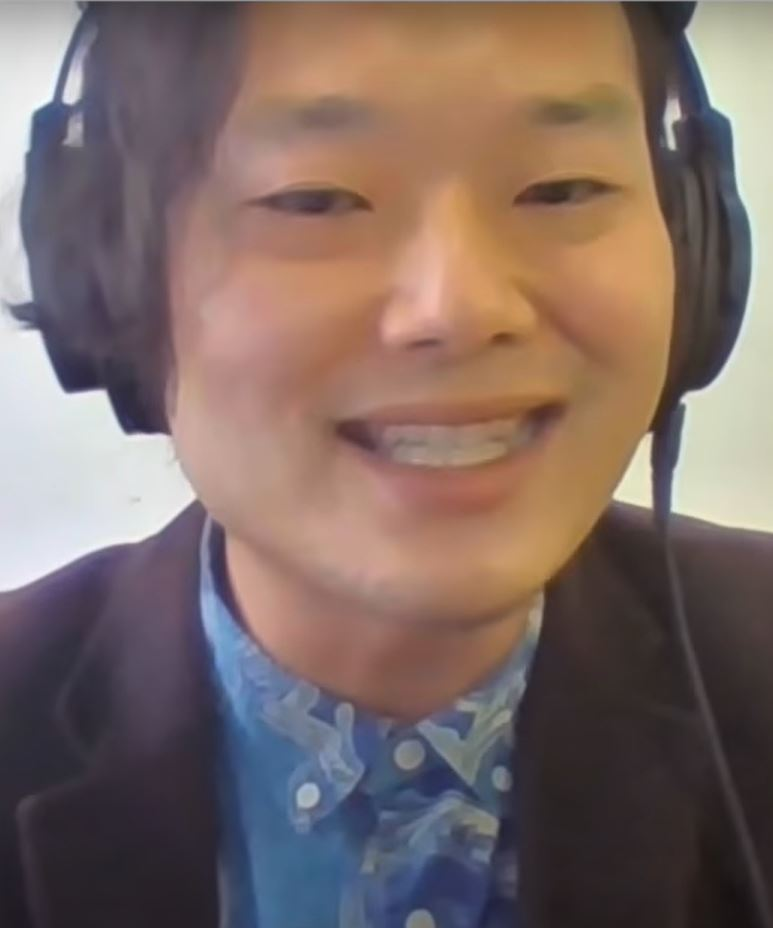
Candidate	Jimmy Gomez	David Kim
Party	Democratic	Democratic
Popular vote	105,394	84,020
Percentage	55.6%	44.4%
U.S. Representative before election
Jimmy Gomez
Democratic
Elected U.S. Representative
Jimmy Gomez
Democratic

The incumbent was Democrat Jimmy Gomez, who had represented the district since 2017 and was re-elected with 51.3% of the vote in 2022.

=== Candidates ===
Advanced to general

- Jimmy Gomez (Democratic), incumbent U.S. representative
- David Kim (Democratic), former MacArthur Park neighborhood council board member and runner-up for this district in 2020 and 2022

Eliminated in primary

- David Ferrell (Democratic), attorney
- Calvin Lee (Republican), businessman
- Aaron Reveles (Peace and Freedom), teacher

=== Endorsements ===
Jimmy Gomez (D)

Political parties

- California Democratic Party
- Los Angeles Democratic Party

Organizations

- AIPAC
- California Environmental Voters
- California Young Democrats
- Democratic Majority for Israel
- End Citizens United
- Equality California
- Humane Society Legislative Fund
- League of Conservation Voters
- Peace Action
- Planned Parenthood Action Fund
- Sierra Club

Labor unions

- AFSCME California
- California Federation of Labor
- California Federation of Teachers
- California Professional Firefighters
- California Teachers Association
- IBEW Local 11
- International Brotherhood of Teamsters Joint Council 42
- National Education Association
- SEIU United Healthcare Workers West
- United Association Local 398
- United Auto Workers
- United Farm Workers
David Kim (D)

Local officials

- Kenneth Mejia, Los Angeles City Controller

Organizations

- Americans for Democratic Action Southern California
- Vote Common Good
Calvin Lee (R)

Political parties

- American Independent Party
- California Republican Party
Aaron Reveles (P&F)

Political parties

- Peace and Freedom Party

=== Fundraising ===
Campaign finance reports as of February 14, 2024
Candidate	Raised	Spent	Cash on hand
David Ferrell (D)	$9,072	$5,930	$3,141
Jimmy Gomez (D)	$1,088,878	$733,445	$910,936
David Kim (D)	$100,011	$95,640	$4,371
Source: Federal Election Commission

=== Predictions ===
Source	Ranking	As of
The Cook Political Report	Solid D	February 2, 2023
Inside Elections	Solid D	March 10, 2023
Sabato's Crystal Ball	Safe D	February 23, 2023
Elections Daily	Safe D	February 5, 2024
CNalysis	Solid D	November 16, 2023

=== Results ===
California's 34th congressional district, 2024
Primary election
Party	Candidate	Votes	%
Democratic	Jimmy Gomez (incumbent)	41,611	51.2
Democratic	David Kim	22,703	27.9
Republican	Calvin Lee	11,495	14.1
Peace and Freedom	Aaron Reveles	3,223	4.0
Democratic	David Ferrell	2,312	2.8
Total votes		81,344	100.0
General election
Democratic	Jimmy Gomez (incumbent)	105,394	55.6
Democratic	David Kim	84,020	44.4
Total votes		189,414	100.0
Democratic hold			

== District 35 ==
2024 California's 35th congressional district election
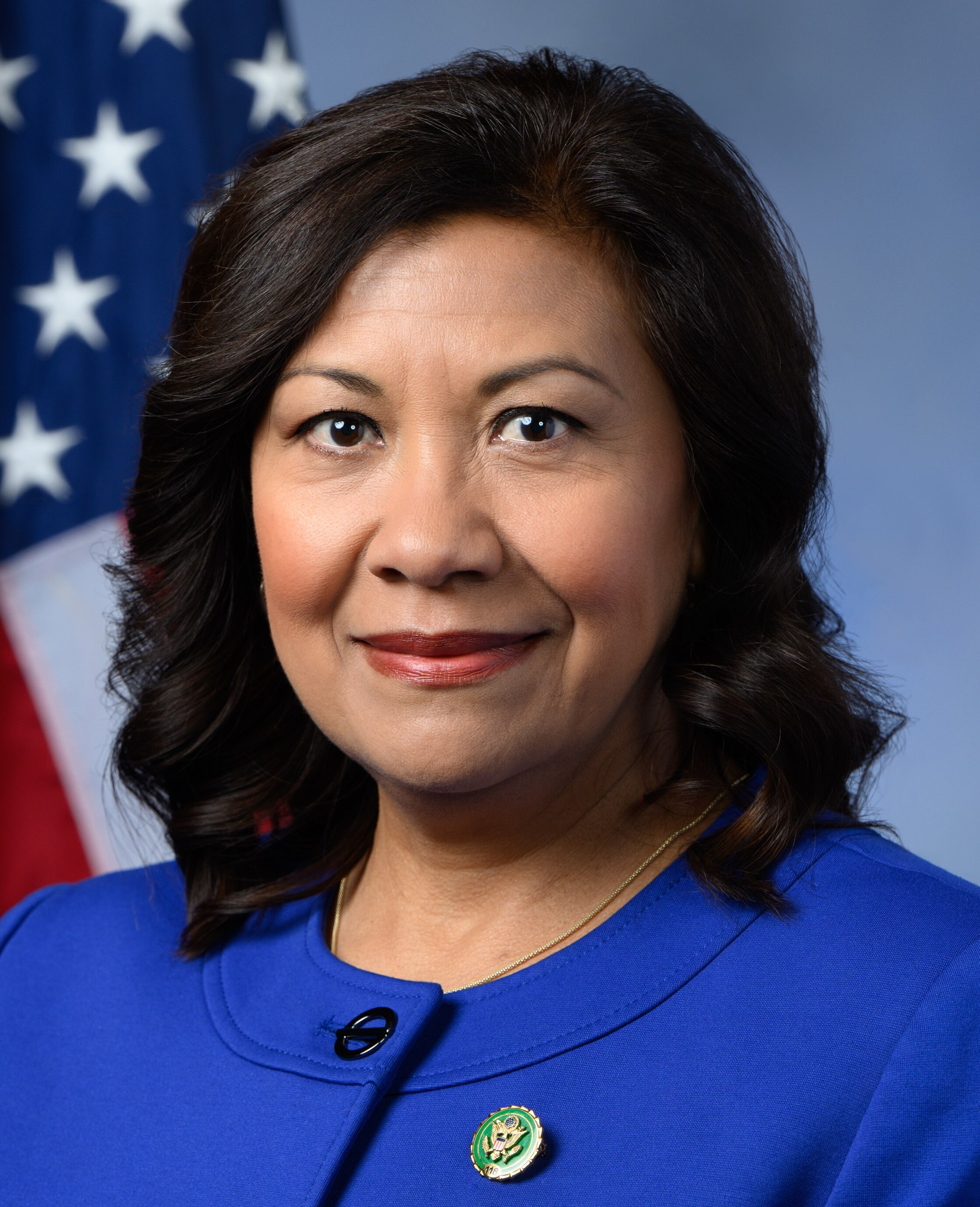

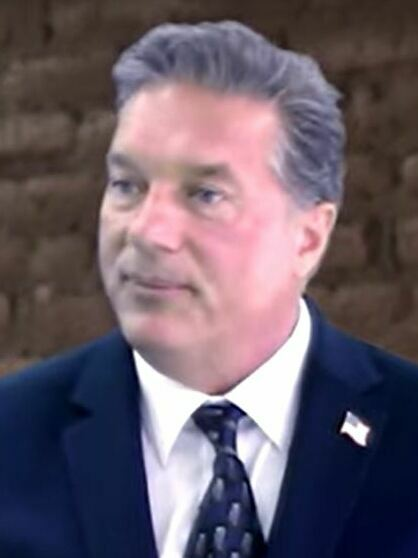
Candidate	Norma Torres	Mike Cargile
Party	Democratic	Republican
Popular vote	136,413	97,142
Percentage	58.4%	41.6%
- County results Torres: 50–60% 60–70% Cargile: 50–60%
U.S. Representative before election
Norma Torres
Democratic
Elected U.S. Representative
Norma Torres
Democratic

The incumbent was Democrat Norma Torres, who had represented the district since 2015 and was re-elected with 57.4% of the vote in 2022.

=== Candidates ===
Advanced to general

- Mike Cargile (Republican), independent filmmaker and runner-up for this district in 2020 and 2022
- Norma Torres (Democratic), incumbent U.S. representative

Eliminated in primary

- Melissa May (Democratic), former Mountain View School District trustee
- Vijal Suthar (Republican), hotel manager

=== Endorsements ===
Mike Cargile (R)

Organizations

- California ProLife Council
- California Rifle and Pistol Association

Political parties

- American Independent Party
Vijal Suthar (R)

Local officials

- Carl DeMaio, former San Diego city councilor (2008–2012)

Organizations

- California College Republicans
Norma Torres (D)

U.S. representatives

- Gabby Giffords, U.S. representative from Arizona's 8th congressional district (2007–2012)

Political parties

- California Democratic Party
- Los Angeles Democratic Party

Organizations

- AIPAC
- California Environmental Voters
- Equality California
- Feminist Majority PAC
- Giffords
- Humane Society Legislative Fund
- League of Conservation Voters
- National Women's Political Caucus
- Planned Parenthood Action Fund
- Population Connection Action Fund

Labor unions

- AFSCME California
- California Federation of Labor
- California Federation of Teachers
- California Professional Firefighters
- California Teachers Association
- IBEW Local 11
- International Brotherhood of Teamsters Joint Council 42
- National Education Association
- National Union of Healthcare Workers
- SEIU United Healthcare Workers West
- United Association Local 398
- United Auto Workers

Newspapers

- Inland Valley Daily Bulletin
Declined to endorse

Organizations

- California Young Democrats

=== Fundraising ===
Campaign finance reports as of February 14, 2024
Candidate	Raised	Spent	Cash on hand
Norma Torres (D)	$453,582	$529,935	$271,829
Mike Cargile (R)	$51,310	$47,539	$5,143
Melissa May (D)	$13,394 (Note: $1,000 of this total was self-funded by May.)	$12,041	$1,352
Source: Federal Election Commission

=== Predictions ===
Source	Ranking	As of
The Cook Political Report	Solid D	February 2, 2023
Inside Elections	Solid D	March 10, 2023
Sabato's Crystal Ball	Safe D	February 23, 2023
Elections Daily	Safe D	February 5, 2024
CNalysis	Solid D	November 16, 2023

=== Results ===
California's 35th congressional district, 2024
Primary election
Party	Candidate	Votes	%
Democratic	Norma Torres (incumbent)	39,051	48.2
Republican	Mike Cargile	32,082	39.6
Democratic	Melissa May	6,432	7.9
Republican	Vijal Suthar	3,491	4.3
Total votes		81,056	100.0
General election
Democratic	Norma Torres (incumbent)	136,413	58.4
Republican	Mike Cargile	97,142	41.6
Total votes		233,555	100.0
Democratic hold			

==== By county ====
County	Norma Torres Democratic		Mike Cargile Republican		Margin		Total votes cast
County	#	%	#	%	#	%	Total votes cast
Los Angeles (part)	26,567	66.75%	13,234	33.25%	13,333	33.50%	39,801
Riverside (part)	9,066	49.27%	9,336	50.73%	−270	−1.47%	18,402
San Bernardino (part)	100,780	57.47%	74,572	42.53%	26,208	14.95%	175,352
Totals	136,413	58.41%	97,142	41.59%	39,271	16.81%	233,555

== District 36 ==
2024 California's 36th congressional district election
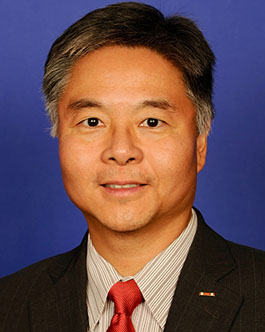

Candidate	Ted Lieu	Melissa Toomim
Party	Democratic	Republican
Popular vote	246,002	111,985
Percentage	68.7%	31.3%
- County results W. Lieu: 60–70%
U.S. Representative before election
Ted Lieu
Democratic
Elected U.S. Representative
Ted Lieu
Democratic

The incumbent was Democrat Ted Lieu, who had represented the district since 2015 and was re-elected with 69.8% of the vote in 2022.

=== Candidates ===
Advanced to general

- Ted Lieu (Democratic), incumbent U.S. representative
- Melissa Toomim (Republican), journalist and candidate for the 32nd district in 2022

Eliminated in primary

- Claire Anderson (no party preference), businesswoman
- Ariana Hakami (Republican), financial advisor and candidate for this district in 2022

=== Endorsements ===
Ariana Hakami (R)

Organizations

- California ProLife Council
Ted Lieu (D)

Political parties

- California Democratic Party
- Culver City Democratic Party
- Los Angeles Democratic Party

Organizations

- AIPAC
- Americans for Democratic Action Southern California
- California Environmental Voters
- California Young Democrats
- Democratic Majority for Israel
- Equality California
- Everytown for Gun Safety Action Fund
- Feminist Majority PAC
- Humane Society Legislative Fund
- Natural Resources Defense Council
- Planned Parenthood Action Fund
- Population Connection Action Fund
- Pro-Israel America
- Sierra Club
- Stonewall Democratic Club

Labor unions

- AFSCME California
- California Federation of Labor
- California Federation of Teachers
- California Professional Firefighters
- IBEW Local 11
- International Brotherhood of Teamsters Joint Council 42
- National Union of Healthcare Workers
- United Association Local 398
- United Auto Workers
Melissa Toomim (R)

Local officials

- Carl DeMaio, former San Diego city councilor (2008–2012)

Organizations

- California College Republicans

Political parties

- American Independent Party
- California Republican Party

=== Fundraising ===
Campaign finance reports as of February 14, 2024
Candidate	Raised	Spent	Cash on hand
Ted Lieu (D)	$1,284,495	$1,459,830	$619,055
Ariana Hakami (R)	$2,840 (Note: $2,500 of this total was self-funded by Hakami.)	$2,802	$243
Melissa Toomim (R)	$13,331 (Note: $820 of this total was self-funded by Toomim.)	$12,458	$1,020
Claire Anderson (NPP)	$25,521 (Note: $22,000 of this total was self-funded by Anderson.)	$23,762	$1,759
Source: Federal Election Commission

=== Predictions ===
Source	Ranking	As of
The Cook Political Report	Solid D	February 2, 2023
Inside Elections	Solid D	March 10, 2023
Sabato's Crystal Ball	Safe D	February 23, 2023
Elections Daily	Safe D	February 5, 2024
CNalysis	Solid D	November 16, 2023

=== Results ===
California's 36th congressional district, 2024
Primary election
Party	Candidate	Votes	%
Democratic	Ted Lieu (incumbent)	125,858	68.5
Republican	Melissa Toomim	27,440	14.9
Republican	Ariana Hakami	25,823	14.1
No party preference	Claire Anderson	4,509	2.5
Total votes		183,630	100.0
General election
Democratic	Ted Lieu (incumbent)	246,002	68.7
Republican	Melissa Toomim	111,985	31.3
Total votes		357,987	100.0
Democratic hold			

== District 37 ==
2024 California's 37th congressional district election
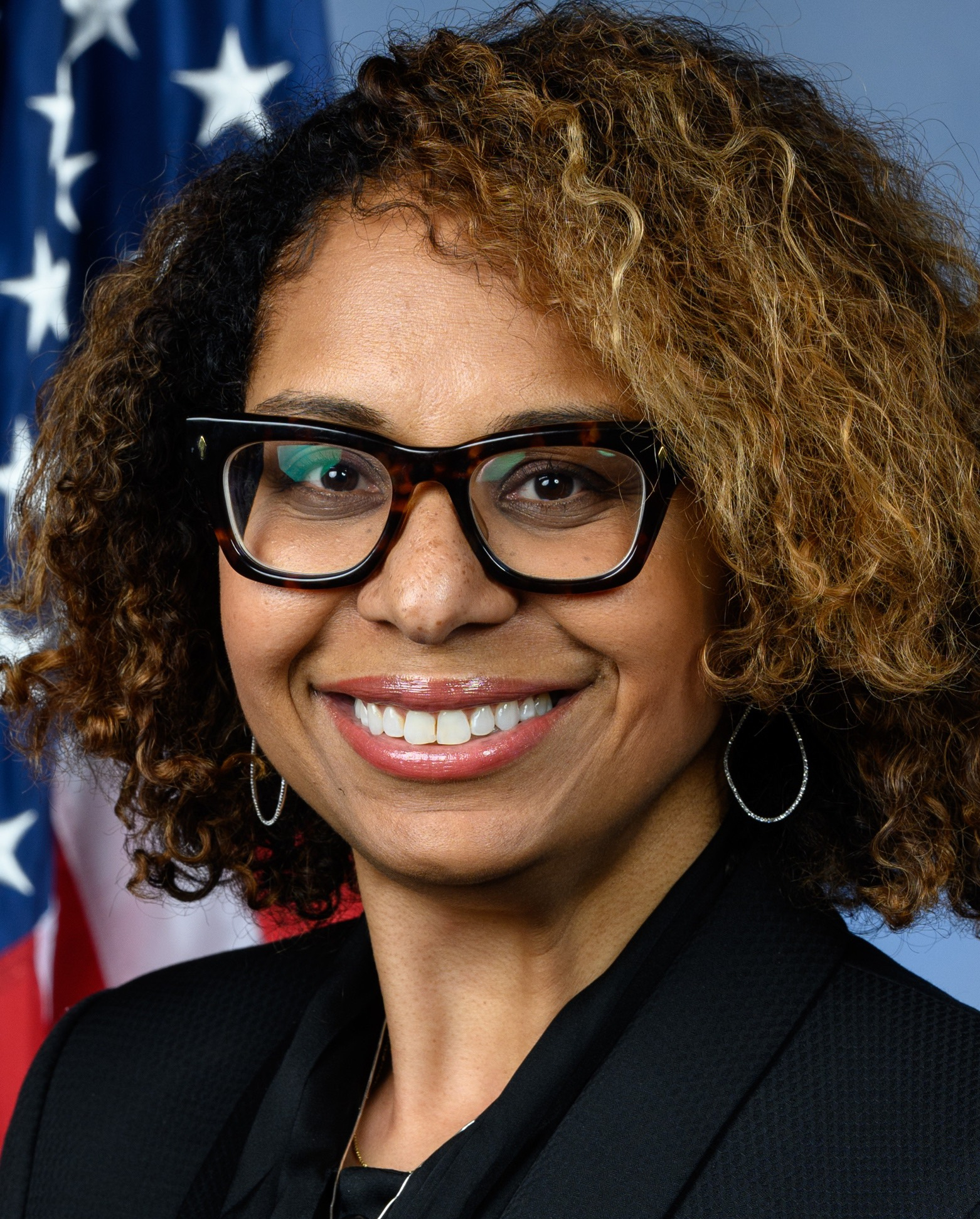

Candidate	Sydney Kamlager-Dove	Juan Rey
Party	Democratic	No party preference
Popular vote	160,364	44,450
Percentage	78.3%	21.7%
- County results Kamlager-dove: 70–80%
U.S. Representative before election
Sydney Kamlager-Dove
Democratic
Elected U.S. Representative
Sydney Kamlager-Dove
Democratic

The incumbent was Democrat Sydney Kamlager-Dove, who had represented the district since 2023. She was elected with 64.0% of the vote in 2022, running against another Democrat.

=== Candidates ===
Advanced to general

- Sydney Kamlager-Dove (Democratic), incumbent U.S. representative
- Juan Rey (no party preference), (Note: Rey is a member of the Working Class Party, but ran as No Party Preference because the Working Class Party does not currently have ballot access in California.) train mechanic

Eliminated in primary

- Adam Carmichael (Democratic), software engineer
- Baltazar Fedalizo (Republican), businessman and candidate for this district in 2022 (write-in)
- John Parker (Peace and Freedom), political organizer and activist

=== Endorsements ===
Sydney Kamlager-Dove (D)

Political parties

- California Democratic Party
- Culver City Democratic Party
- Los Angeles Democratic Party

Organizations

- Americans for Democratic Action Southern California
- California Environmental Voters
- California Young Democrats
- Equality California
- Humane Society Legislative Fund
- J Street PAC
- Jewish Democratic Council of America (post-primary)
- League of Conservation Voters
- National Women's Political Caucus
- Planned Parenthood Action Fund
- Population Connection Action Fund
- Sierra Club
- Stonewall Democratic Club
- Vote Mama

Labor unions

- AFSCME California
- California Federation of Labor
- California Federation of Teachers
- California Professional Firefighters
- California Teachers Association
- IBEW Local 11
- National Education Association
- National Union of Healthcare Workers
- SEIU United Healthcare Workers West
- United Association Local 398
- United Auto Workers

Newspapers

- Los Angeles Sentinel
Baltazar Fedalizo (R)

Organizations

- California ProLife Council
John Parker (P&F)

Political parties

- Peace and Freedom Party
Juan Rey

Political parties

- Working Class Party

=== Fundraising ===
Campaign finance reports as of February 14, 2024
Candidate	Raised	Spent	Cash on hand
Sydney Kamlager-Dove (D)	$643,384	$569,532	$175,730
Source: Federal Election Commission

=== Predictions ===
Source	Ranking	As of
The Cook Political Report	Solid D	February 2, 2023
Inside Elections	Solid D	March 10, 2023
Sabato's Crystal Ball	Safe D	February 23, 2023
Elections Daily	Safe D	February 5, 2024
CNalysis	Solid D	November 16, 2023

=== Results ===
California's 37th congressional district, 2024
Primary election
Party	Candidate	Votes	%
Democratic	Sydney Kamlager-Dove (incumbent)	62,413	71.8
No party preference	Juan Rey	8,917	10.3
Democratic	Adam Carmichael	7,520	8.7
Peace and Freedom	John Parker	7,316	8.4
Republican	Baltazar Fedalizo (write-in)	752	0.9
Total votes		86,918	100.0
General election
Democratic	Sydney Kamlager-Dove (incumbent)	160,364	78.3
No party preference	Juan Rey	44,450	21.7
Total votes		204,814	100.0
Democratic hold			

== District 38 ==
2024 California's 38th congressional district election
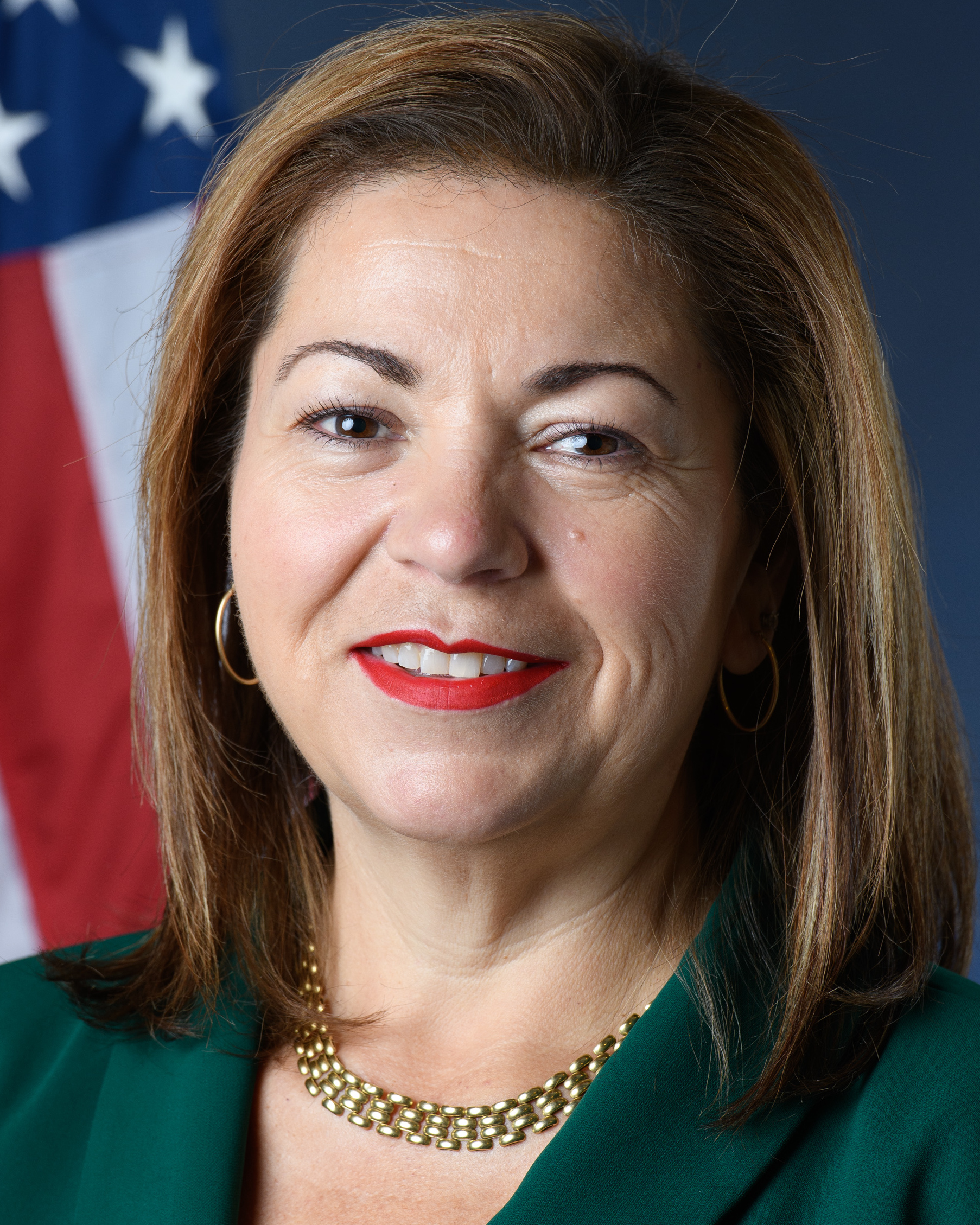

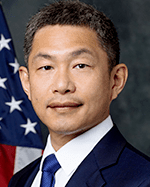
Candidate	Linda Sánchez	Eric Ching
Party	Democratic	Republican
Popular vote	165,110	110,818
Percentage	59.8%	40.2%
- County results T. Sánchez: 50–60% 60–70%
U.S. Representative before election
Linda Sánchez
Democratic
Elected U.S. Representative
Linda Sánchez
Democratic

The incumbent was Democrat Linda Sánchez, who had represented the district since 2013 and was re-elected with 58.1% of the vote in 2022.

=== Candidates ===
Advanced to general

- Eric Ching (Republican), Walnut city councilor and runner-up for this district in 2022
- Linda Sánchez (Democratic), incumbent U.S. representative

Eliminated in primary

- Robert Ochoa (Republican), entrepreneur
- John Sarega (Republican), businessman and candidate for this district in 2022

=== Endorsements ===
Eric Ching (R)

Local officials

- Carl DeMaio, former San Diego city councilor (2008–2012)

Organizations

- California College Republicans

Political parties

- American Independent Party
- California Republican Party
Robert Ochoa (R)

Organizations

- California Rifle and Pistol Association
Linda Sánchez (D)

Political parties

- California Democratic Party

Organizations

- AIPAC
- Americans for Democratic Action Southern California
- California Environmental Voters
- California Young Democrats
- Equality California
- Humane Society Legislative Fund
- J Street PAC
- Joint Action Committee for Political Affairs
- National Women's Political Caucus
- Planned Parenthood Action Fund (post-primary)
- Sierra Club
- Stonewall Democratic Club

Labor unions

- AFSCME California
- California Federation of Labor
- California Federation of Teachers
- California Professional Firefighters
- California Teachers Association
- IBEW Local 11
- International Brotherhood of Teamsters Joint Council 42
- National Education Association
- National Union of Healthcare Workers
- UFCW Local 324
- United Association Local 398
- United Auto Workers
- United Farm Workers

=== Fundraising ===
Campaign finance reports as of February 14, 2024
Candidate	Raised	Spent	Cash on hand
Linda Sánchez (D)	$911,863	$757,636	$597,371
Eric Ching (R)	$16,307	$4,687	$16,483
Source: Federal Election Commission

=== Predictions ===
Source	Ranking	As of
The Cook Political Report	Solid D	February 2, 2023
Inside Elections	Solid D	March 10, 2023
Sabato's Crystal Ball	Safe D	February 23, 2023
Elections Daily	Safe D	February 5, 2024
CNalysis	Solid D	November 16, 2023

=== Results ===
California's 38th congressional district, 2024
Primary election
Party	Candidate	Votes	%
Democratic	Linda Sánchez (incumbent)	62,325	56.2
Republican	Eric Ching	26,744	24.1
Republican	John Sarega	13,841	12.5
Republican	Robert Ochoa	8,034	7.2
Total votes		110,944	100.0
General election
Democratic	Linda Sánchez (incumbent)	165,110	59.8
Republican	Eric Ching	110,818	40.2
Total votes		275,928	100.0
Democratic hold			

==== By county ====
County	Linda Sánchez Democratic		Eric Ching Republican		Margin		Total votes cast
County	#	%	#	%	#	%	Total votes cast
Los Angeles (part)	152,498	60.39%	100,019	39.61%	52,479	20.78%	252,517
Orange (part)	12,612	53.87%	10,799	46.13%	1,813	7.74%	23,411
Totals	165,110	59.84%	110,818	40.16%	54,292	19.68%	275,928

== District 39 ==
2024 California's 39th congressional district election
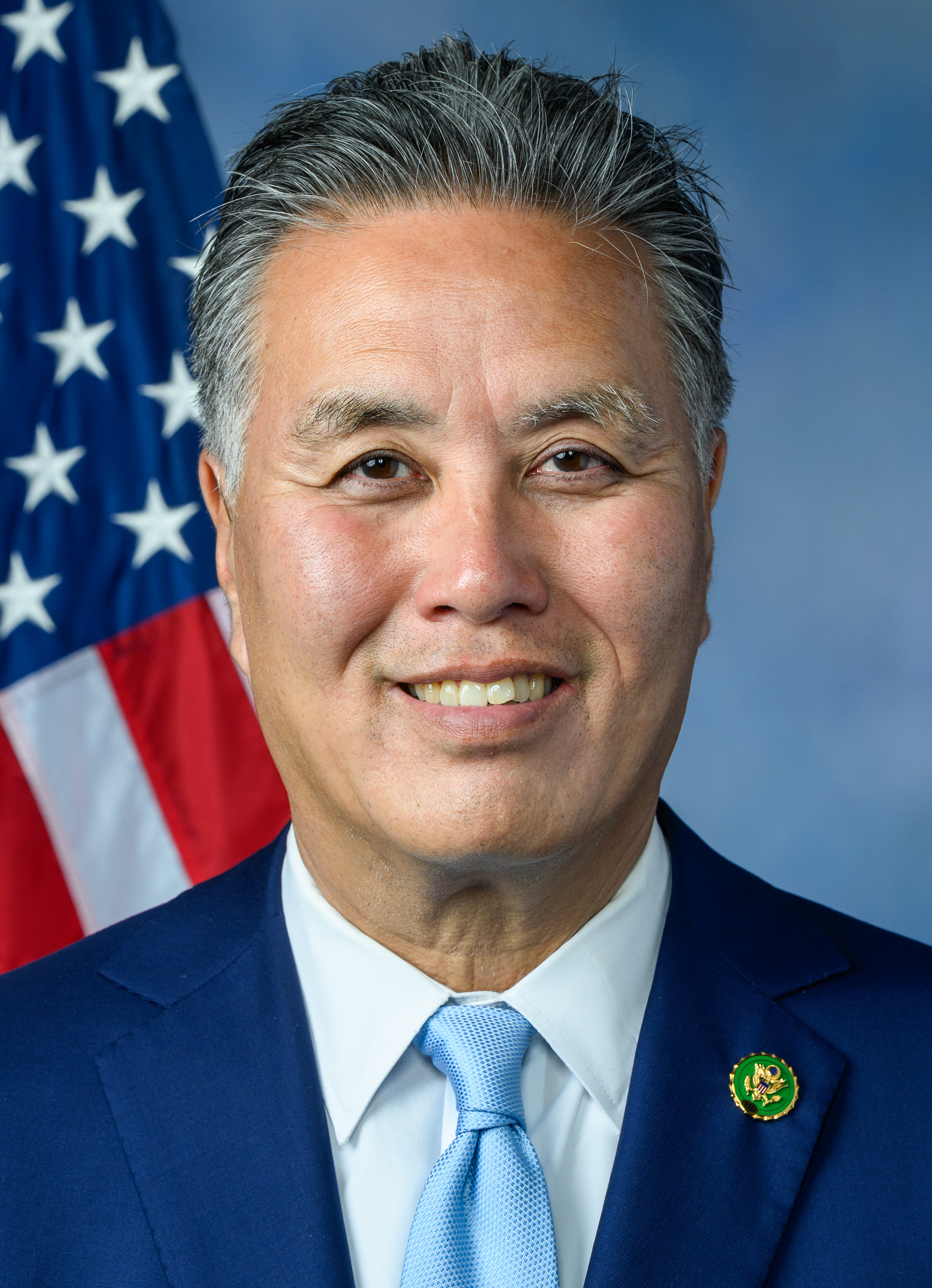

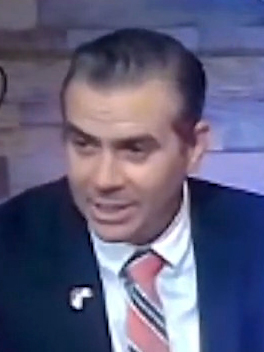
Candidate	Mark Takano	David Serpa
Party	Democratic	Republican
Popular vote	130,191	99,469
Percentage	56.7%	43.3%
- County results Takano: 50–60%
U.S. Representative before election
Mark Takano
Democratic
Elected U.S. Representative
Mark Takano
Democratic

The incumbent was Democrat Mark Takano, who had represented the district since 2013 and was re-elected with 57.7% of the vote in 2022.

=== Candidates ===
Advanced to general

- David Serpa (Republican), businessman
- Mark Takano (Democratic), incumbent U.S. representative

=== Endorsements ===
David Serpa (R)

Organizations

- California Rifle and Pistol Association

Political parties

- California Republican Party
Mark Takano (D)

Individuals

- Kelley Robinson, president of Human Rights Campaign

Political parties

- California Democratic Party

Organizations

- Americans for Democratic Action Southern California
- Asian American Action Fund
- Bend the Arc
- California Environmental Voters
- California Young Democrats
- Equality California
- Everytown for Gun Safety Action Fund
- Human Rights Campaign
- Humane Society Legislative Fund
- J Street PAC
- Planned Parenthood Action Fund (post-primary)
- Stonewall Democratic Club

Labor unions

- AFSCME California
- California Federation of Labor
- California Federation of Teachers
- California Professional Firefighters
- California Teachers Association
- International Brotherhood of Teamsters Joint Council 42
- National Education Association
- National Union of Healthcare Workers
- SEIU United Healthcare Workers West
- United Association Local 398
- United Auto Workers

=== Fundraising ===
Campaign finance reports as of June 30, 2024
Candidate	Raised	Spent	Cash on hand
Mark Takano (D)	$907,118	$1,113,661	$284,662
David Serpa (R)	$26,133	$18,307	$7,826
Source: Federal Election Commission

=== Predictions ===
Source	Ranking	As of
The Cook Political Report	Solid D	February 2, 2023
Inside Elections	Solid D	March 10, 2023
Sabato's Crystal Ball	Safe D	February 23, 2023
Elections Daily	Safe D	February 5, 2024
CNalysis	Solid D	November 16, 2023

=== Results ===
California's 39th congressional district, 2024
Primary election
Party	Candidate	Votes	%
Democratic	Mark Takano (incumbent)	48,351	55.5
Republican	David Serpa	38,750	44.5
Total votes		87,101	100.0
General election
Democratic	Mark Takano (incumbent)	130,191	56.7
Republican	David Serpa	99,469	43.3
Total votes		229,660	100.0
Democratic hold			

== District 40 ==
2024 California's 40th congressional district election
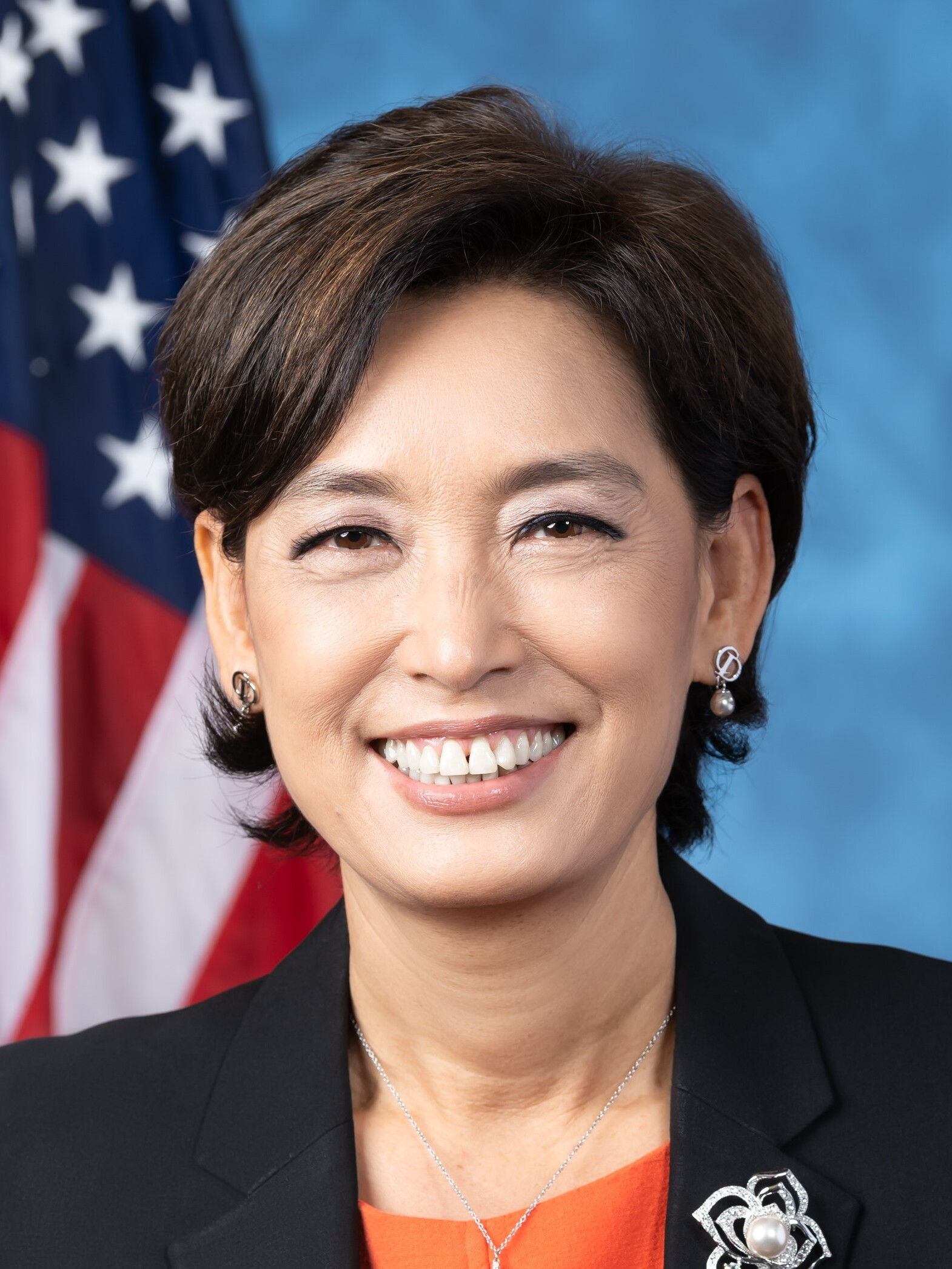

Candidate	Young Kim	Joe Kerr
Party	Republican	Democratic
Popular vote	211,998	171,637
Percentage	55.3%	44.7%
- County results Kim: 50–60%
U.S. Representative before election
Young Kim
Republican
Elected U.S. Representative
Young Kim
Republican

The incumbent was Republican Young Kim, who was re-elected with 56.8% of the vote in 2022.

=== Candidates ===
Advanced to general

- Joe Kerr (Democratic), retired Orange County fire captain, candidate for Orange County Board of Supervisors District 4 in 2018, and candidate for SD-38 in 2022
- Young Kim (Republican), incumbent U.S. representative

Eliminated in primary

- Allyson Muñiz Damikolas (Democratic), Tustin Unified School District trustee

=== Endorsements ===
Joe Kerr (D)

U.S. representatives

- Lou Correa, CA-46 (2017–present)
- Val Hoyle, OR-4 (2023–present)
- Pramila Jayapal, WA-7 (2017–present)
- Mike Levin, CA-49 (2019–present)
- Mark Pocan, WI-2 (2013–present)
- Katie Porter, CA-47 (2019–2025)
- Jamie Raskin, MD-8 (2017–present)
- Adam Schiff, CA-30 (2001–2024)

Statewide officials

- Jerry Brown, former governor of California (1975–1983, 2011–2019)
- Fiona Ma, California State Treasurer (2019–present)
- Gavin Newsom, governor of California (2019–present)

State senators

- Joe Dunn, 34th district (1998–2006)
- Dave Min, 34th district (2020–2025)
- Josh Newman, 29th district (2016–2018, 2020–2024)
- Tom Umberg, 34th district (2018–present)

State assemblymembers

- Adam Gray, 21st district (2012–2022)
- Sharon Quirk-Silva, 65th district (2016–present)

Local officials

- Ashleigh Aitken, mayor of Anaheim (2022–present)
- Farrah Khan, mayor of Irvine (2020–2024)

Organizations

- California Young Democrats
- Congressional Progressive Caucus PAC
- Democratic Majority for Israel (post-primary)
- Equality California (post-primary)
- Jewish Democratic Council of America (post-primary)
- National Women's Political Caucus
- Planned Parenthood Action Fund (post-primary)
- Reproductive Freedom for All (post-primary)

Labor unions

- AFSCME California
- American Federation of State, County and Municipal Employees
- Association of Flight Attendants
- California AFL-CIO
- California School Employees Association
- Communications Workers of America Local 9510
- International Association of Fire Fighters Local 3522 and 3631
- International Brotherhood of Electrical Workers Local 47 and 441
- International Brotherhood of Teamsters District Joint Council 42
- International Union of Painters and Allied Trades District Council 36
- Laborers' Union Local 652
- Office and Professional Employees International Union
- Orange County Employees Association
- Orange County Labor Federation
- United Association Local 250
- United Association Local 398
- United Auto Workers
Young Kim (R)

State officials

- Mike Huckabee, governor of Arkansas (1996–2007)

Local officials

- Carl DeMaio, former San Diego city councilor (2008–2012)

Newspapers

- Orange County Register

Political parties

- California Republican Party

Organizations

- AIPAC
- Americans for Prosperity
- California College Republicans
- California ProLife Council
- California Rifle and Pistol Association
- Howard Jarvis Taxpayers Association PAC
- Humane Society Legislative Fund
- The LIBRE Initiative
- Log Cabin Republicans PAC (post-primary)
- Maggie's List
- National Rifle Association Political Victory Fund
- Pro-Israel America
- United States Chamber of Commerce
Allyson Muñiz Damikolas (D)

U.S. representatives

- Lois Frankel, FL-22 (2013–present)
- Linda Sánchez, CA-38 (2003–present)

Organizations

- 314 Action Fund
- CHC BOLD PAC
- EMILY's List
- Equality California
- Latino Victory Fund
- National Organization for Women PAC
- National Women's Political Caucus
- PODER PAC

Labor unions

- California Teachers Association
- National Education Association
- National Union of Healthcare Workers
Declined to endorse

Political parties

- California Democratic Party

=== Fundraising ===
Campaign finance reports as of February 14, 2024
Candidate	Raised	Spent	Cash on hand
Young Kim (R)	$4,097,491	$1,987,963	$2,509,006
Allyson Muñiz Damikolas (D)	$549,563 (Note: $65,000 of this total was self-funded by Damikolas.)	$494,776	$54,786
Joe Kerr (D)	$1,082,947 (Note: $868,819 of this total was self-funded by Kerr.)	$1,002,971	$79,976
Source: Federal Election Commission

=== Predictions ===
Source	Ranking	As of
The Cook Political Report	Likely R	February 2, 2023
Inside Elections	Likely R	March 10, 2023
Sabato's Crystal Ball	Likely R	November 4, 2024
Elections Daily	Likely R	November 4, 2024
CNalysis	Lean R	November 4, 2024

=== Results ===
California's 40th congressional district, 2024
Primary election
Party	Candidate	Votes	%
Republican	Young Kim (incumbent)	109,963	56.4
Democratic	Joe Kerr	49,965	25.6
Democratic	Allyson Muñiz Damikolas	35,153	18.0
Total votes		195,081	100.0
General election
Republican	Young Kim (incumbent)	211,998	55.3
Democratic	Joe Kerr	171,637	44.7
Total votes		383,635	100.0
Republican hold			

==== By county ====
County	Young Kim Republican		Joe Kerr Democratic		Margin		Total votes cast
County	#	%	#	%	#	%	Total votes cast
Orange (part)	194,398	55.05%	158,714	44.95%	35,684	10.11%	353,112
Riverside (part)	2,685	57.24%	2,006	42.76%	679	14.47%	4,691
San Bernardino (part)	14,915	57.74%	10,917	42.26%	3,998	15.48%	25,832
Totals	211,998	55.26%	171,637	44.74%	40,361	10.52%	383,635

== District 41 ==
2024 California's 41st congressional district election
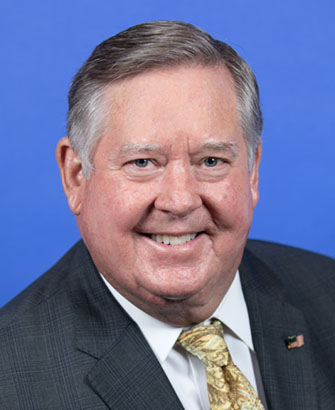

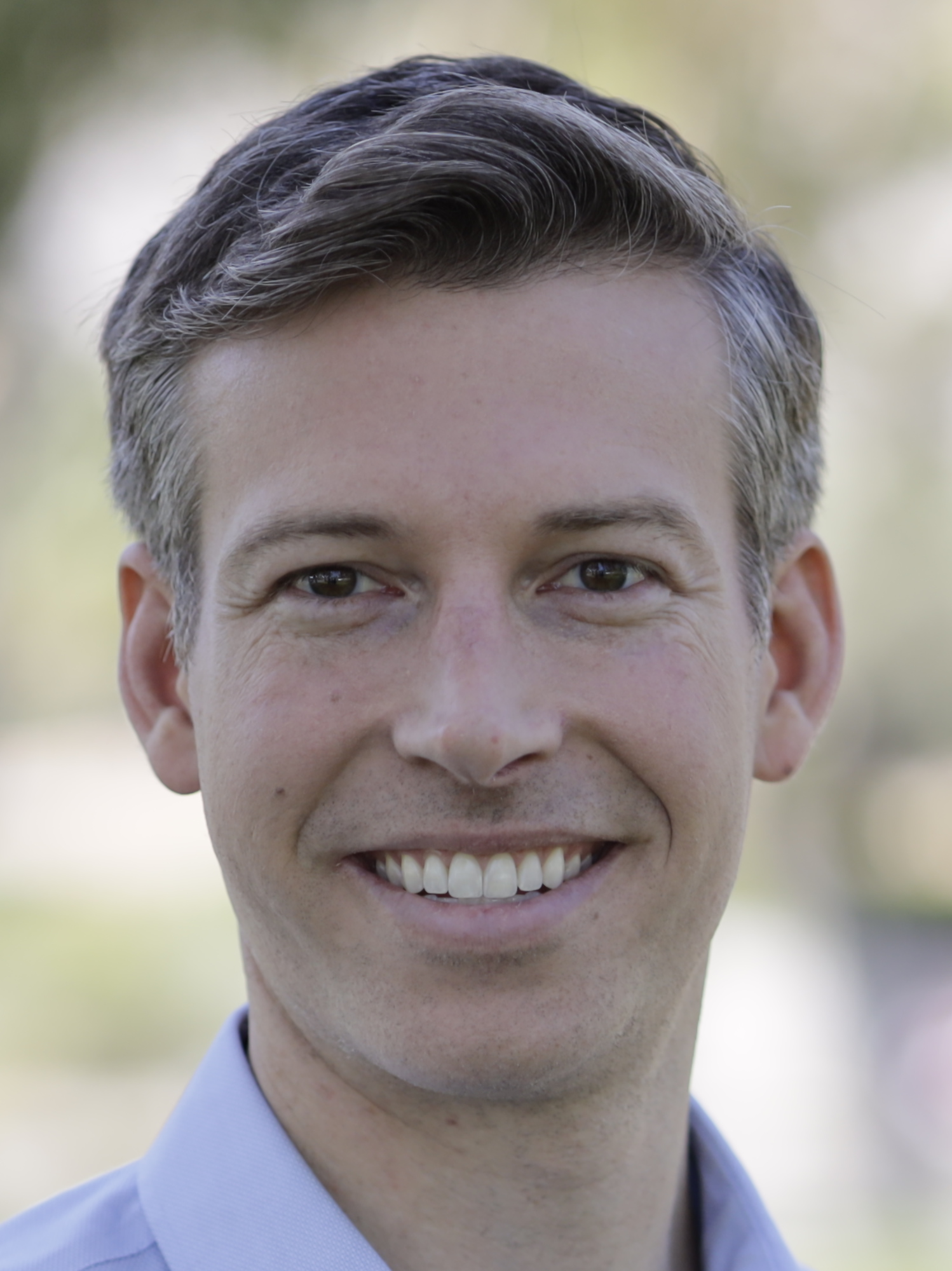
Candidate	Ken Calvert	Will Rollins
Party	Republican	Democratic
Popular vote	183,216	171,229
Percentage	51.7%	48.3%
- County results Calvert: 50–60%
U.S. Representative before election
Ken Calvert
Republican
Elected U.S. Representative
Ken Calvert
Republican

The incumbent was Republican Ken Calvert, who was re-elected with 52.3% of the vote in 2022.

=== Candidates ===
Advanced to general

- Ken Calvert (Republican), incumbent U.S. representative
- Will Rollins (Democratic), counterterrorism attorney and runner-up for this district in 2022

Eliminated in primary

- Anna Nevenic (Democratic), nurse and perennial candidate

=== Endorsements ===
Ken Calvert (R)

State officials

- Mike Huckabee, governor of Arkansas (1996–2007)

Local officials

- Carl DeMaio, former San Diego city councilor (2008–2012)

Political parties

- American Independent Party
- California Republican Party

Organizations

- AIPAC
- California College Republicans
- California ProLife Council
- California Republican Assembly
- California Rifle and Pistol Association
- Humane Society Legislative Fund
- Log Cabin Republicans PAC (post-primary)
- National Rifle Association Political Victory Fund
- Pro-Israel America
- Republican Jewish Coalition
- U.S. Chamber of Commerce
Will Rollins (D)

U.S. senators

- Barbara Boxer, former U.S. senator from California (1993–2017)

U.S. representatives

- Pete Aguilar, CA-33 (2015–present)
- Nanette Barragán, CA-44 (2017–present)
- Ami Bera, CA-6 (2013–present)
- Salud Carbajal, CA-24 (2017–present)
- Tony Cárdenas, CA-29 (2013–present)
- Judy Chu, CA-28 (2009–present)
- Jim Costa, CA-21 (2005–present)
- Mark DeSaulnier, CA-10 (2015–present)
- Anna Eshoo, CA-16 (1993–present)
- John Garamendi, CA-8 (2009–present)
- Robert Garcia, CA-42 (2023–present)
- Gabby Giffords, AZ-8 (2007–2012)
- Jared Huffman, CA-2 (2013–present)
- Sara Jacobs, CA-51 (2021–present)
- Sydney Kamlager-Dove, CA-37 (2023–present)
- Ro Khanna, CA-17 (2017–present)
- Barbara Lee, CA-12 (1998–present)
- Mike Levin, CA-49 (2019–present)
- Ted Lieu, CA-36 (2015–present)
- Zoe Lofgren, CA-18 (1995–present)
- Doris Matsui, CA-7 (2005–present)
- Seth Moulton, MA-06 (2015–present)
- Kevin Mullin, CA-15 (2023–present)
- Grace Napolitano, CA-31 (1999–present)
- Nancy Pelosi, CA-11 (1987–present) and former Speaker of the House (2007–2011, 2019–2023)
- Scott Peters, CA-50 (2013–present)
- Katie Porter, CA-47 (2019–present)
- Raul Ruiz, CA-25 (2013–present)
- Adam Schiff, CA-30 (2001–present)
- Brad Sherman, CA-32 (1997–present)
- Eric Swalwell, CA-14 (2013–present)
- Mark Takano, CA-39 (2013–present)
- Ritchie Torres, NY-15 (2021–present)

State legislators

- Adrian Boafo, Maryland state delegate from the 23rd district (2023–present)

Political parties

- California Democratic Party

Organizations

- Blue Dog PAC
- California Environmental Voters
- California Young Democrats
- Congressional Equality Caucus PAC
- DCCC Red to Blue
- Democratic Majority for Israel
- Desert Stonewall Democrats
- End Citizens United
- Equality California
- Everytown for Gun Safety (post-primary)
- Giffords
- Human Rights Campaign
- Jewish Democratic Council of America
- League of Conservation Voters
- LGBTQ Victory Fund
- Natural Resources Defense Council (post-primary)
- NewDem Action Fund
- Patriotic Millionaires
- Planned Parenthood Action Fund
- Reproductive Freedom for All
- Sierra Club
- Stonewall Democratic Club

Labor unions

- AFSCME California
- Association of Flight Attendants
- California Federation of Labor
- California Federation of Teachers
- California Professional Firefighters
- California Teachers Association
- Communications Workers of America
- IBEW Local 440
- National Education Association
- National Union of Healthcare Workers
- Palm Springs Police Officers Association
- SEIU United Healthcare Workers West
- Service Employees International Union California
- United Association Local 398
- United Auto Workers

=== Fundraising ===
Campaign finance reports as of March 31, 2024
Candidate	Raised	Spent	Cash on hand
Ken Calvert (R)	$4,395,180	$1,825,606	$2,639,377
Anna Nevenic (D)	$11,180	$5,780	$5,400
Will Rollins (D)	$4,775,382	$1,658,288	$3,162,026
Source: Federal Election Commission

=== Polling ===
Poll source	Date(s) administered	Sample size	Margin of error	Ken Calvert (R)	Will Rollins (D)	Other/Undecided
Global Strategy Group (D)	October 3–6, 2024	500 (LV)	± 4.4%	45%	45%	10%
USC/CSU	September 14–21, 2024	539 (LV)	± 4.2%	48%	47%	5%
RMG Research (Note: Poll sponsored by U.S. Term Limits, whose term limits pledge Rollins has signed)	September 5–12, 2024	461 (LV)	± 4.6%	35%	41%	24%
David Binder Research (D) (Note: Poll sponsored by Rollins's campaign)	May 1–6, 2024	600 (LV)	± 4.0%	44%	45%	11%

=== Predictions ===
Source	Ranking	As of
The Cook Political Report	Tossup	February 2, 2023
Inside Elections	Tilt R	May 9, 2024
Sabato's Crystal Ball	Lean R	November 4, 2024
Elections Daily	Lean R	November 4, 2024
CNalysis	Tilt R	November 4, 2024

=== Results ===
California's 41st congressional district, 2024
Primary election
Party	Candidate	Votes	%
Republican	Ken Calvert (incumbent)	85,959	53.0
Democratic	Will Rollins	62,245	38.4
Democratic	Anna Nevenic	13,862	8.6
Total votes		162,066	100.0
General election
Republican	Ken Calvert (incumbent)	183,216	51.7
Democratic	Will Rollins	171,229	48.3
Total votes		354,445	100.0
Republican hold			

== District 42 ==
2024 California's 42nd congressional district election
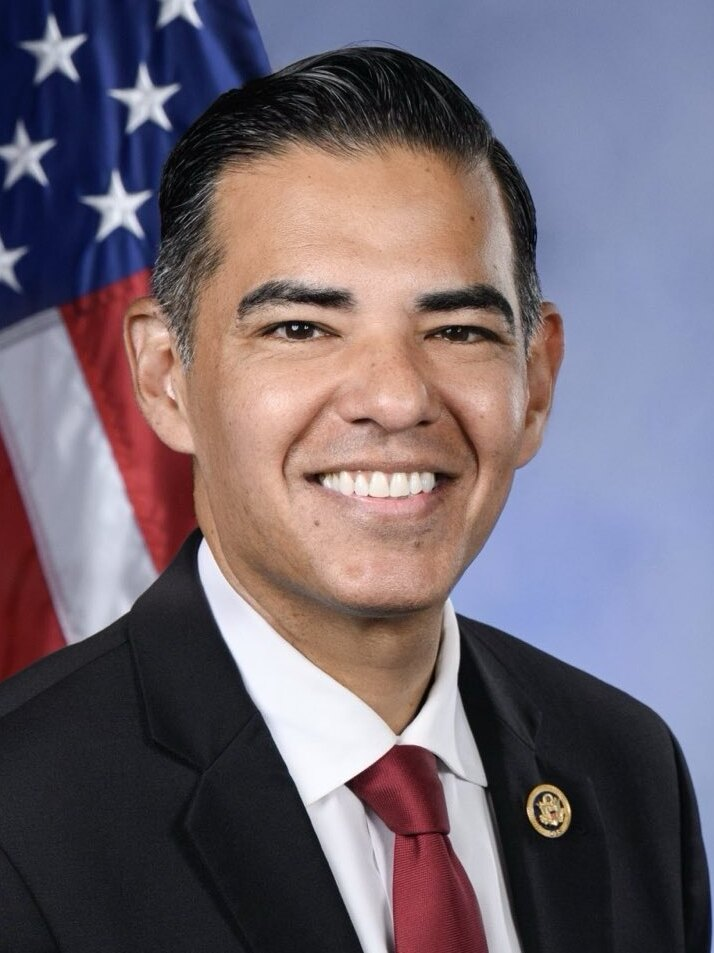

Candidate	Robert Garcia	John Briscoe
Party	Democratic	Republican
Popular vote	159,153	74,410
Percentage	68.1%	31.9%
- County results Garcia: 60–70%
U.S. Representative before election
Robert Garcia
Democratic
Elected U.S. Representative
Robert Garcia
Democratic

The incumbent was Democrat Robert Garcia, who had represented the district since 2023, and was elected with 68.4% of the vote in 2022.

=== Candidates ===
Advanced to general

- John Briscoe (Republican), Ocean View School District trustee, perennial candidate, and runner-up for this district in 2022
- Robert Garcia (Democratic), incumbent U.S. representative

Eliminated in primary

- Joaquin Beltran (Democratic), engineer and candidate for this district in 2022
- Nicole López (Democratic), communications consultant and candidate for this district in 2022

=== Endorsements ===
John Briscoe (R)

Local officials

- Carl DeMaio, former San Diego city councilor (2008–2012)

Organizations

- California College Republicans
- California ProLife Council

Political parties

- California Republican Party
Robert Garcia (D)

Individuals

- Kelley Robinson, president of Human Rights Campaign

Political parties

- California Democratic Party
- Los Angeles Democratic Party

Organizations

- California Young Democrats
- Equality California
- Human Rights Campaign
- Humane Society Legislative Fund
- Joint Action Committee for Political Affairs
- Planned Parenthood Action Fund
- Sierra Club
- Stonewall Democratic Club

Labor unions

- AFSCME California
- California Federation of Labor
- California Federation of Teachers
- California Professional Firefighters
- IBEW Local 11
- International Brotherhood of Teamsters Joint Council 42
- National Union of Healthcare Workers
- SEIU United Healthcare Workers West
- UFCW Local 324
- United Association Local 398
- United Auto Workers

=== Fundraising ===
Campaign finance reports as of February 14, 2024
Candidate	Raised	Spent	Cash on hand
Joaquin Beltran (D)	$17,195 (Note: $3,810 of this total was self-funded by Beltran.)	$14,722	$2,472
Robert Garcia (D)	$721,147	$553,777	$497,931
Nicole López (D)	$3,339	$2,544	$1,095
John Briscoe (R)	$250,000 (Note: $250,000 of this total was self-funded by Briscoe.)	$4,308	$245,691
Source: Federal Election Commission

=== Predictions ===
Source	Ranking	As of
The Cook Political Report	Solid D	February 2, 2023
Inside Elections	Solid D	March 10, 2023
Sabato's Crystal Ball	Safe D	February 23, 2023
Elections Daily	Safe D	February 5, 2024
CNalysis	Solid D	November 16, 2023

=== Results ===
California's 42nd congressional district, 2024
Primary election
Party	Candidate	Votes	%
Democratic	Robert Garcia (incumbent)	49,891	52.1
Republican	John Briscoe	30,599	31.9
Democratic	Nicole López	8,758	9.1
Democratic	Joaquin Beltran	6,532	6.8
Total votes		95,780	100.0
General election
Democratic	Robert Garcia (incumbent)	159,153	68.1
Republican	John Briscoe	74,410	31.9
Total votes		233,563	100.0
Democratic hold			

== District 43 ==
2024 California's 43rd congressional district election
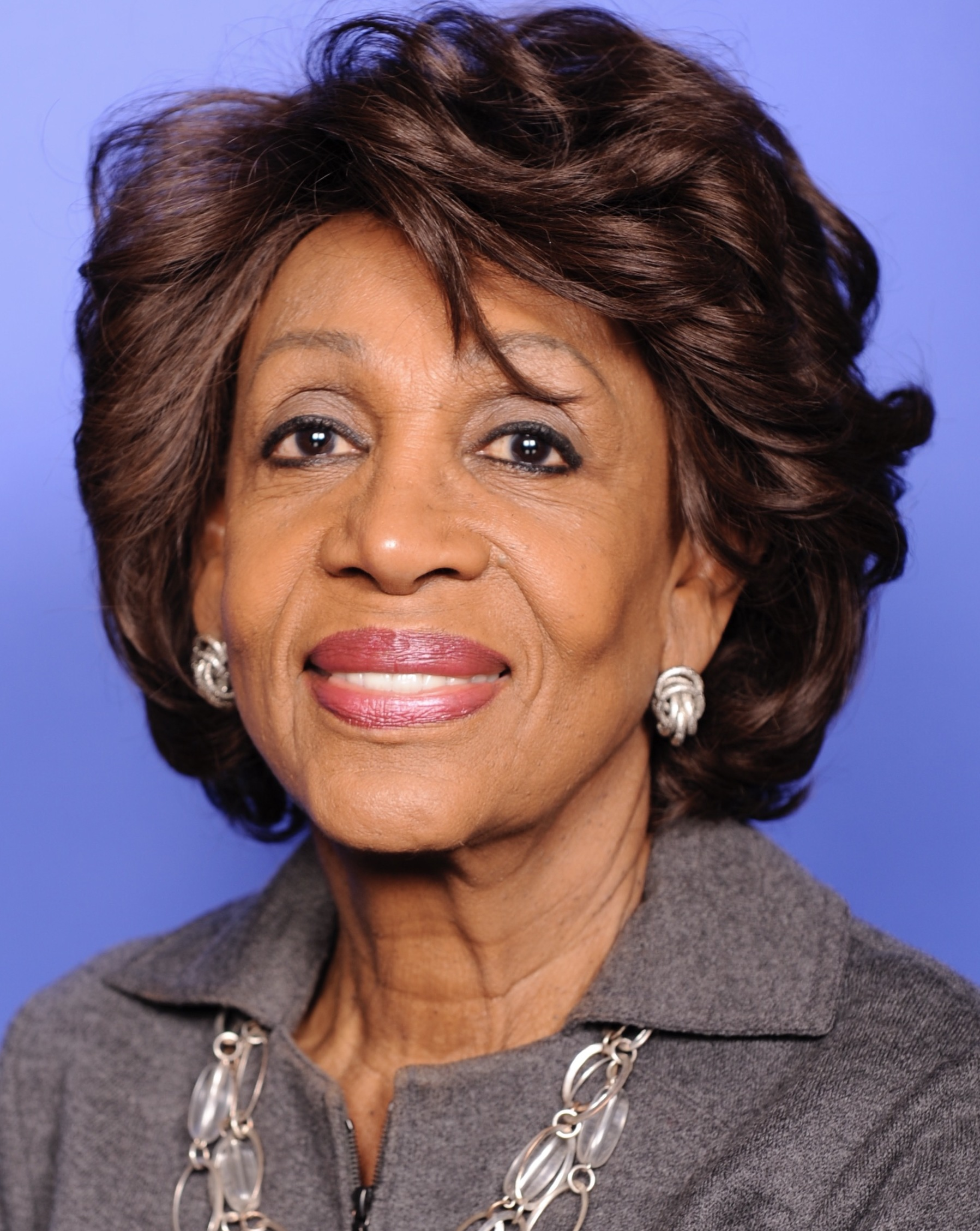

Candidate	Maxine Waters	Steve Williams
Party	Democratic	Republican
Popular vote	160,080	53,152
Percentage	75.1%	24.9%
- County results Waters: 70–80%
U.S. Representative before election
Maxine Waters
Democratic
Elected U.S. Representative
Maxine Waters
Democratic

The incumbent was Democrat Maxine Waters, who had represented the district since 1991 and was re-elected with 77.3% of the vote in 2022.

=== Candidates ===
Advanced to general

- Maxine Waters (Democratic), incumbent U.S. representative
- Steve Williams (Republican), real estate broker

Eliminated in primary

- Gregory Cheadle (Democratic), attorney and perennial candidate
- David Knight (Republican), education business owner
- Chris Wiggins (Democratic), human resources recruiter and runner-up for the 37th district in 2016

=== Endorsements ===
Maxine Waters (D)

Political parties

- California Democratic Party
- Los Angeles Democratic Party

Organizations

- Americans for Democratic Action Southern California
- California Environmental Voters
- California Young Democrats
- Equality California
- Feminist Majority PAC
- Humane Society Legislative Fund
- League of Conservation Voters
- Planned Parenthood Action Fund
- Sierra Club
- Stonewall Democratic Club

Labor unions

- AFSCME California
- California Federation of Labor
- California Federation of Teachers
- California Professional Firefighters
- IBEW Local 11
- International Brotherhood of Teamsters Joint Council 42
- National Union of Healthcare Workers
- United Association Local 398

Newspapers

- Los Angeles Sentinel
Steve Williams (R)

Local officials

- Carl DeMaio, former San Diego city councilor (2008–2012)

Organizations

- California College Republicans
- California ProLife Council
- California Republican Assembly
- California Rifle and Pistol Association (post-primary)
- Howard Jarvis Taxpayers Association PAC

Political parties

- American Independent Party
- California Republican Party

=== Fundraising ===
Campaign finance reports as of February 14, 2024
Candidate	Raised	Spent	Cash on hand
Maxine Waters (D)	$429,143	$508,279	$156,496
Chris Wiggins (D)	$650	$0	$1,225
David Knight (R)	$4,475 (Note: $3,850 of this total was self-funded by Knight.)	$3,728	$747
Source: Federal Election Commission

=== Predictions ===
Source	Ranking	As of
The Cook Political Report	Solid D	February 2, 2023
Inside Elections	Solid D	March 10, 2023
Sabato's Crystal Ball	Safe D	February 23, 2023
Elections Daily	Safe D	February 5, 2024
CNalysis	Solid D	November 16, 2023

=== Results ===
California's 43rd congressional district, 2024
Primary election
Party	Candidate	Votes	%
Democratic	Maxine Waters (incumbent)	54,673	69.8
Republican	Steve Williams	10,896	13.9
Republican	David Knight	5,647	7.2
Democratic	Chris Wiggins	4,999	6.4
Democratic	Gregory Cheadle	2,075	2.7
Total votes		78,290	100.0
General election
Democratic	Maxine Waters (incumbent)	160,080	75.1
Republican	Steve Williams	53,152	24.9
Total votes		213,232	100.0
Democratic hold			

== District 44 ==
2024 California's 44th congressional district election
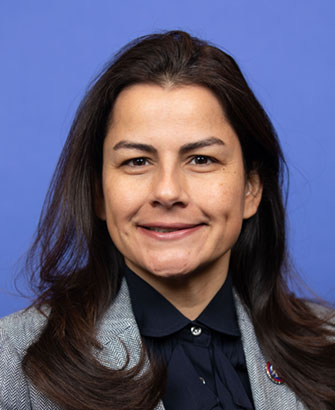

Candidate	Nanette Barragán	Roger Groh
Party	Democratic	Republican
Popular vote	164,765	66,087
Percentage	71.4%	28.6%
- County results Diaz Barragán: 70–80%
U.S. Representative before election
Nanette Barragán
Democratic
Elected U.S. Representative
Nanette Barragán
Democratic

The incumbent was Democrat Nanette Barragán, who had represented the district since 2017 and was re-elected with 72.2% of the vote in 2022.

=== Candidates ===
Advanced to general

- Nanette Barragán (Democratic), incumbent U.S. representative
- Roger Groh (Republican), investment manager

=== Endorsements ===
Nanette Barragán (D)

Political parties

- California Democratic Party
- Los Angeles Democratic Party

Organizations

- AIPAC
- Americans for Democratic Action Southern California
- California Environmental Voters
- California Young Democrats
- Democratic Majority for Israel
- Equality California
- Everytown for Gun Safety (post-primary)
- Feminist Majority PAC
- Friends of the Earth Action
- Humane Society Legislative Fund
- League of Conservation Voters
- National Women's Political Caucus
- Planned Parenthood Action Fund (post-primary)
- Sierra Club

Labor unions

- AFSCME California
- Association of Flight Attendants
- California Federation of Labor
- California Federation of Teachers
- California Professional Firefighters
- International Brotherhood of Teamsters Joint Council 42 and Local 11
- National Union of Healthcare Workers
- United Auto Workers
- United Farm Workers

Newspapers

- Los Angeles Sentinel
Roger Groh (R)

Local officials

- Carl DeMaio, former San Diego city councilor (2008–2012)

Organizations

- California College Republicans

Political parties

- California Republican Party

=== Fundraising ===
Campaign finance reports as of February 14, 2024
Candidate	Raised	Spent	Cash on hand
Nanette Barragán (D)	$645,140	$730,488	$1,418,423
Source: Federal Election Commission

=== Predictions ===
Source	Ranking	As of
The Cook Political Report	Solid D	February 2, 2023
Inside Elections	Solid D	March 10, 2023
Sabato's Crystal Ball	Safe D	February 23, 2023
Elections Daily	Safe D	February 5, 2024
CNalysis	Solid D	November 16, 2023

=== Results ===
California's 44th congressional district, 2024
Primary election
Party	Candidate	Votes	%
Democratic	Nanette Barragán (incumbent)	63,622	70.8
Republican	Roger Groh	26,188	29.2
Total votes		89,810	100.0
General election
Democratic	Nanette Barragán (incumbent)	164,765	71.4
Republican	Roger Groh	66,087	28.6
Total votes		230,852	100.0
Democratic hold			

== District 45 ==
2024 California's 45th congressional district election
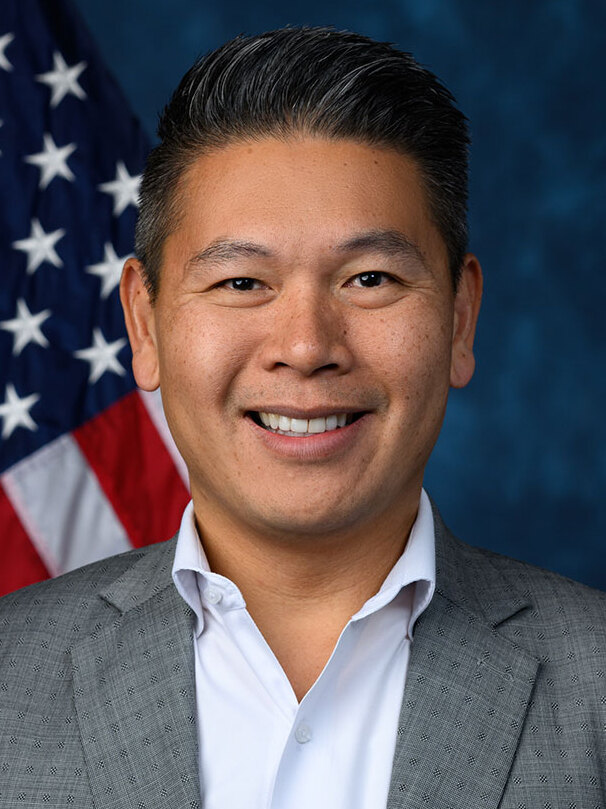

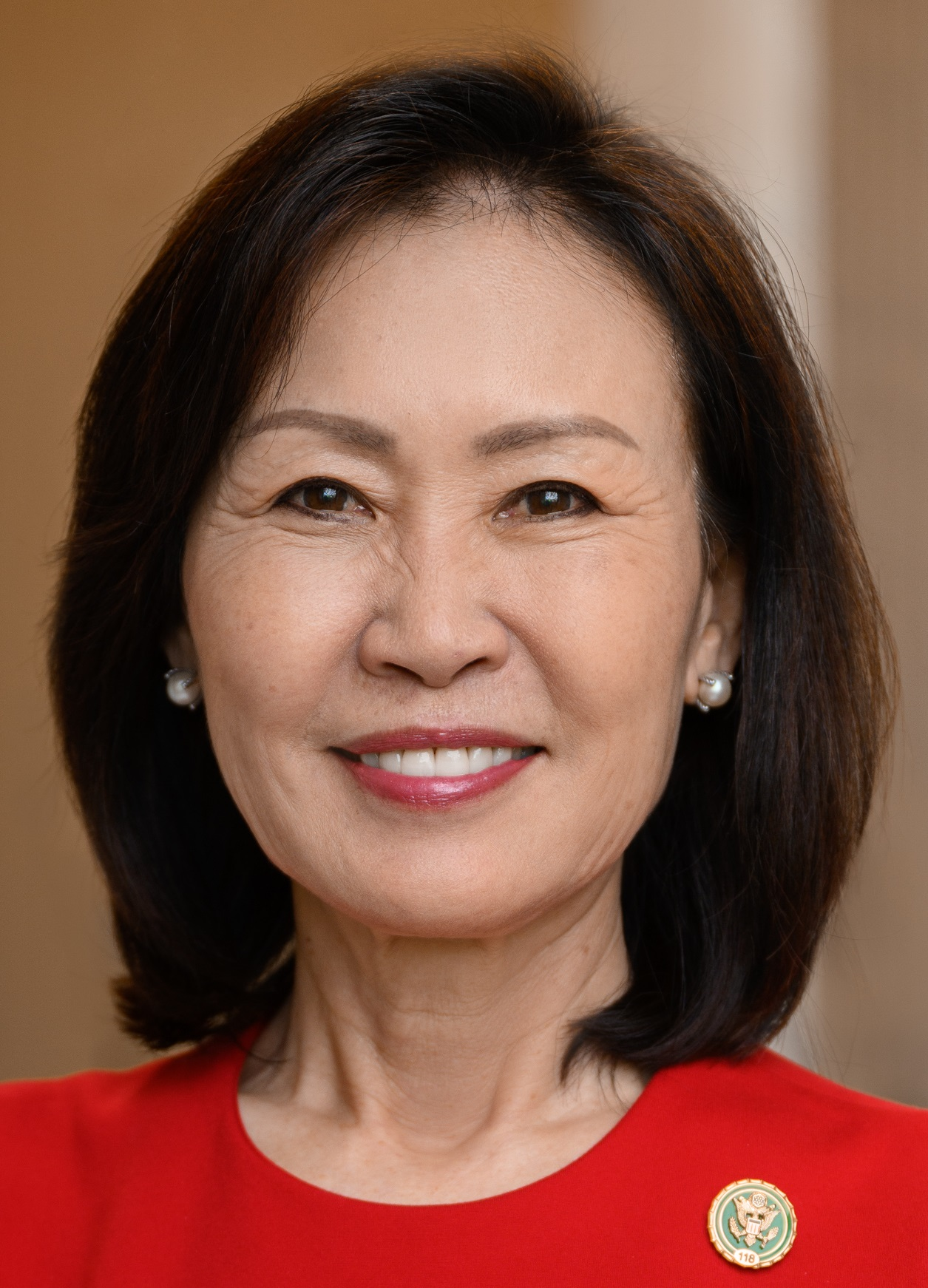
Candidate	Derek Tran	Michelle Steel
Party	Democratic	Republican
Popular vote	158,264	157,611
Percentage	50.1%	49.9%
- County results Tran: 50–60% Steel: 50–60%
U.S. Representative before election
Michelle Steel
Republican
Elected U.S. Representative
Derek Tran
Democratic

The incumbent was Republican Michelle Steel, who was re-elected with 52.4% of the vote in 2022.

=== Candidates ===
Advanced to general

- Michelle Steel (Republican), incumbent U.S. representative
- Derek Tran (Democratic), Consumer Attorneys of California board member

Eliminated in primary

- Cheyenne Hunt (Democratic), attorney and TikTok influencer
- Kim Nguyen-Penaloza (Democratic), Garden Grove city councilor and runner-up for Orange County Board of Supervisors District 2 in 2022
- Aditya Pai (Democratic), attorney

=== Endorsements ===
Michelle Steel (R)

Organizations

- U.S. Chamber of Commerce (post-primary)

=== Predictions ===
Source	Ranking	As of
The Cook Political Report	Tossup	September 6, 2024
Inside Elections	Tossup	October 18, 2024
Sabato's Crystal Ball	Lean R	November 4, 2024
Elections Daily	Lean R	November 4, 2024
CNalysis	Tilt D (flip)	November 4, 2024

=== Results ===
California's 45th congressional district, 2024
Primary election
Party	Candidate	Votes	%
Republican	Michelle Steel (incumbent)	78,022	54.9
Democratic	Derek Tran	22,546	15.9
Democratic	Kim Bernice Nguyen-Penaloza	22,179	15.6
Democratic	Cheyenne Hunt	11,973	8.4
Democratic	Aditya Pai	7,399	5.2
Total votes		142,119	100.0
General election
Democratic	Derek Tran	158,264	50.1
Republican	Michelle Steel (incumbent)	157,611	49.9
Total votes		315,875	100.0
Democratic gain from Republican			

== District 46 ==
2024 California's 46th congressional district election
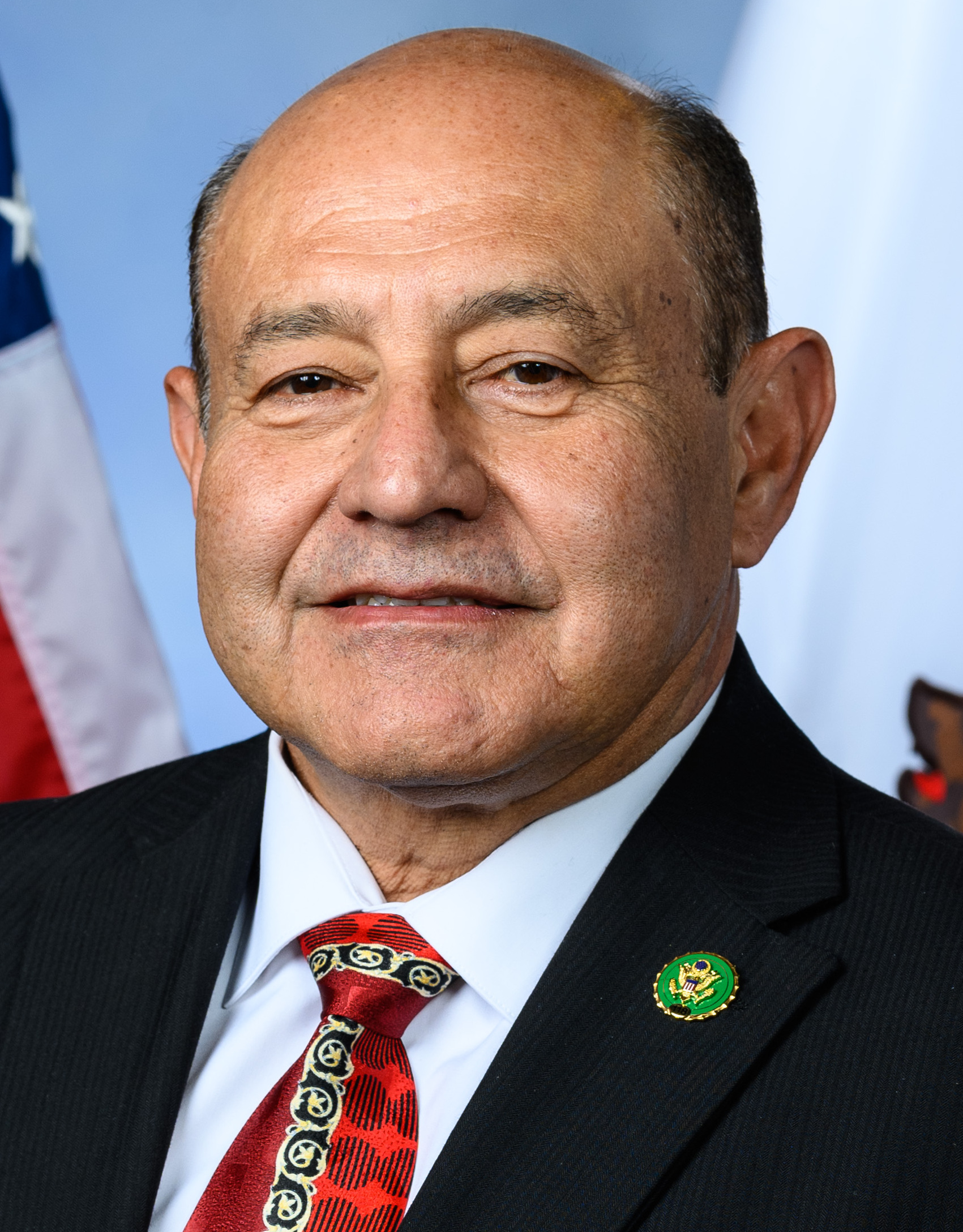

Candidate	Lou Correa	David Pan
Party	Democratic	Republican
Popular vote	134,013	77,279
Percentage	63.4%	36.6%
- County results Correa: 60–70%
U.S. Representative before election
Lou Correa
Democratic
Elected U.S. Representative
Lou Correa
Democratic

The incumbent was Democrat Lou Correa, who had represented the district since 2017 and was re-elected with 61.8% of the vote in 2022.

=== Candidates ===
Advanced to general

- Lou Correa (Democratic), incumbent U.S. representative
- David Pan (Republican), University of California, Irvine professor

=== Endorsements ===
Lou Correa (D)

Political parties

- California Democratic Party

Organizations

- AIPAC
- California Environmental Voters
- California Young Democrats
- Equality California
- Humane Society Legislative Fund
- International Franchise Association
- Planned Parenthood Action Fund (post-primary)
- U.S. Chamber of Commerce

Labor unions

- AFSCME California
- California Federation of Labor
- California Federation of Teachers
- California Professional Firefighters
- International Brotherhood of Teamsters Joint Council 42
- National Union of Healthcare Workers
- Orange County Employees Association
- Orange County Labor Federation
- UFCW Local 324
- United Association Local 398
David Pan (R)

Organizations

- California College Republicans

Political parties

- American Independent Party

=== Fundraising ===
Campaign finance reports as of February 14, 2024
Candidate	Raised	Spent	Cash on hand
Lou Correa (D)	$670,662	$438,796	$1,754,509
David Pan (R)	$48,303 (Note: $10,000 of this total was self-funded by Pan.)	$26,416	$21,886
Source: Federal Election Commission

=== Predictions ===
Source	Ranking	As of
The Cook Political Report	Solid D	February 2, 2023
Inside Elections	Solid D	March 10, 2023
Sabato's Crystal Ball	Safe D	February 23, 2023
Elections Daily	Safe D	February 5, 2024
CNalysis	Solid D	November 16, 2023

=== Results ===
California's 46th congressional district, 2024
Primary election
Party	Candidate	Votes	%
Democratic	Lou Correa (incumbent)	46,184	60.6
Republican	David Pan	30,032	39.4
Total votes		76,216	100.0
General election
Democratic	Lou Correa (incumbent)	134,013	63.4
Republican	David Pan	77,279	36.6
Total votes		211,292	100.0
Democratic hold			

== District 47 ==
2024 California's 47th congressional district election
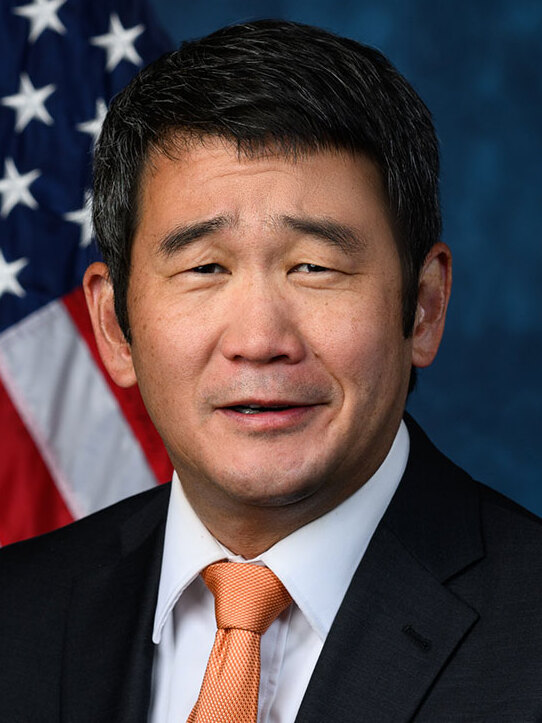

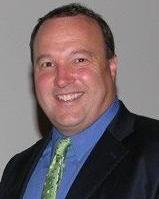
Candidate	Dave Min	Scott Baugh
Party	Democratic	Republican
Popular vote	181,721	171,554
Percentage	51.4%	48.6%
- Min: 50–60% 60–70% 70–80% 80–90% >90% Baugh: 50–60% 60–70% 70–80% 80–90% No votes
U.S. Representative before election
Katie Porter
Democratic
Elected U.S. Representative
Dave Min
Democratic

The incumbent was Democrat Katie Porter, who was re-elected with 51.7% of the vote in 2022. She opted against seeking re-election, instead choosing to run for the U.S. Senate, ultimately losing her bid.

=== Candidates ===
Advanced to general

- Scott Baugh (Republican), former minority leader of the California state assembly, former chair of the Orange County Republican Party, and runner-up for this district in 2022
- Dave Min (Democratic), state senator and candidate for this district (Note: This district was numbered as the 45th district prior to the 2020 redistricting cycle.) in 2018

Eliminated in primary

- Terry Crandall (no party preference), Santa Ana College economics professor
- Tom McGrath (no party preference), chemical engineer
- Long Pham (Republican), former member of the Orange County Department of Education Board of Directors and perennial candidate
- Boyd Roberts (Democratic), realtor and perennial candidate
- Bill Smith (no party preference), retired attorney
- Max Ukropina (Republican), businessman and former aide to U.S. Representatives John Campbell and David Valadao
- Joanna Weiss (Democratic), attorney and law professor
- Shariq Zaidi (Democratic), security guard

=== Predictions ===
Source	Ranking	As of
The Cook Political Report	Lean D	February 2, 2023
Inside Elections	Tossup	October 18, 2024
Sabato's Crystal Ball	Lean D	November 4, 2024
Elections Daily	Lean R (flip)	November 4, 2024
CNalysis	Lean D	November 4, 2024

=== Results ===
California's 47th congressional district, 2024
Primary election
Party	Candidate	Votes	%
Republican	Scott Baugh	57,517	32.1
Democratic	Dave Min	46,393	25.9
Democratic	Joanna Weiss	34,802	19.4
Republican	Max Ukropina	26,585	14.8
Republican	Long Pham	4,862	2.7
No party preference	Terry Crandall	2,878	1.6
Democratic	Boyd Roberts	2,570	1.4
No party preference	Tom McGrath	1,611	0.9
No party preference	Bill Smith	1,062	0.6
Democratic	Shariq Zaidi	788	0.4
Total votes		179,068	100.0
General election
Democratic	Dave Min	181,721	51.4
Republican	Scott Baugh	171,554	48.6
Total votes		353,275	100.0
Democratic hold			

== District 48 ==
2024 California's 48th congressional district election
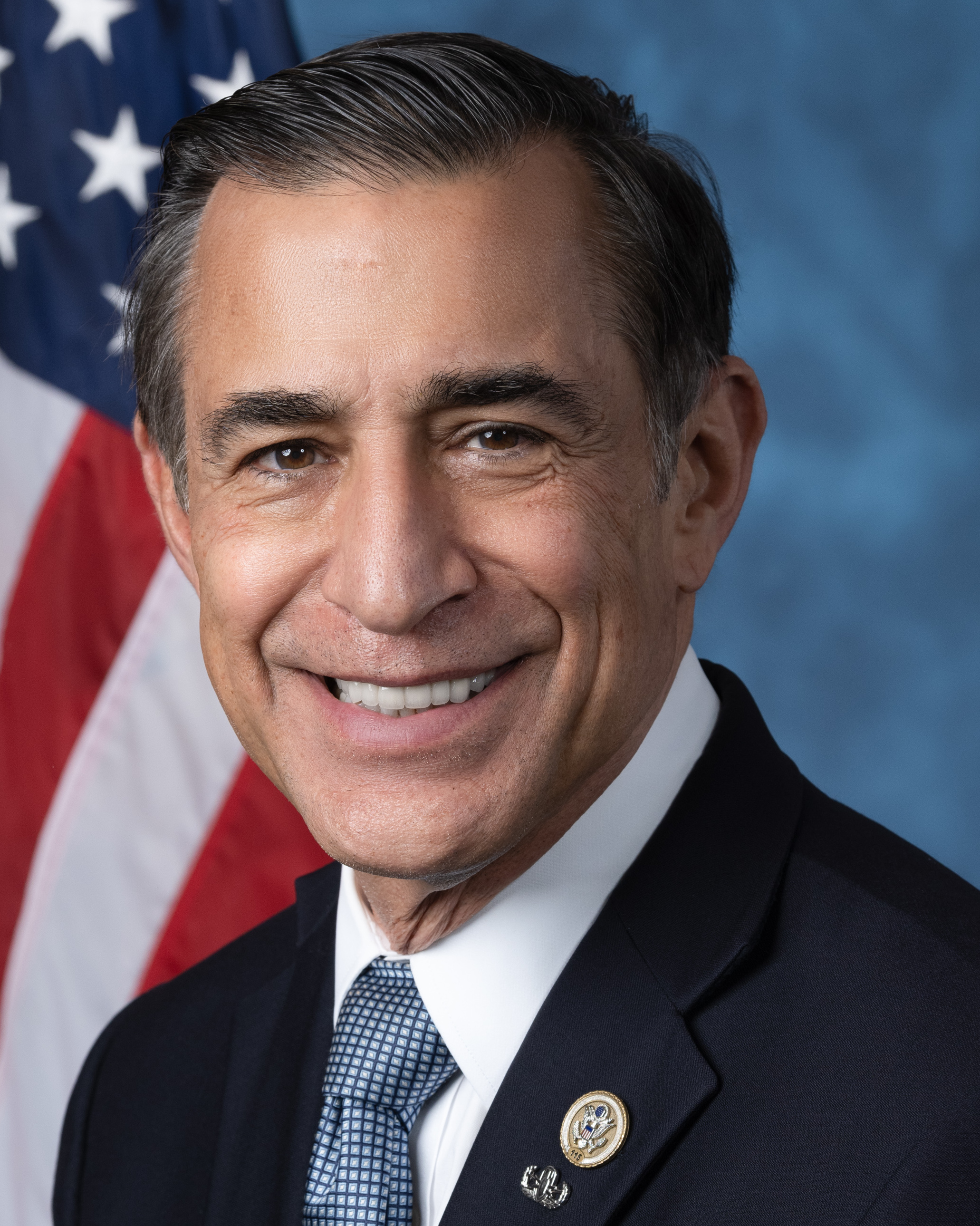

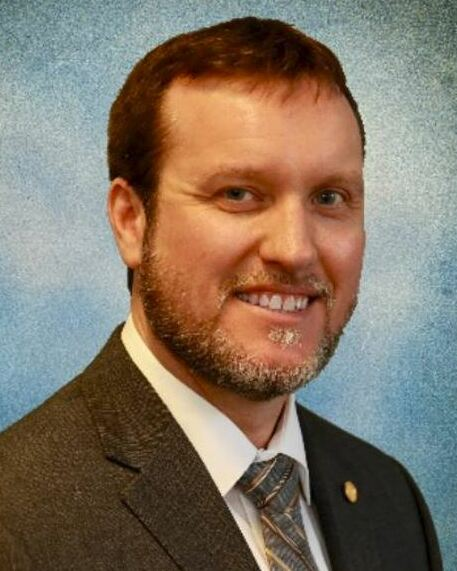
Candidate	Darrell Issa	Stephen Houlahan
Party	Republican	Democratic
Popular vote	213,625	146,665
Percentage	59.3%	40.7%
- County results Issa: 50–60%
U.S. Representative before election
Darrell Issa
Republican
Elected U.S. Representative
Darrell Issa
Republican

The incumbent was Republican Darrell Issa, who had represented the district since 2021 and was re-elected with 60.4% of the vote in 2022.

=== Candidates ===
Advanced to general

- Stephen Houlahan (Democratic), former Santee city councilor and runner-up for this district in 2022
- Darrell Issa (Republican), incumbent U.S. representative

Eliminated in primary

- Lucinda Jahn (no party preference), technician and candidate for this district in 2022
- Mathew Rascon (Democratic), security guard and candidate for this district in 2022
- Whitney Shanahan (Democratic), activist
- Mike Simon (Democratic), engineer

=== Endorsements ===
Stephen Houlahan (D)

Political parties

- California Democratic Party
- San Diego County Democratic Party

Organizations

- California Young Democrats
- Fallbrook Democrats
- San Diego Democrats for Equality
Darrell Issa (R)

Executive branch officials

- Donald Trump, former president of the United States (2017–2021)

State officials

- Mike Huckabee, governor of Arkansas (1996–2007)

Local officials

- Carl DeMaio, former San Diego city councilor (2008–2012)
- Kevin Faulconer, former mayor of San Diego (2014–2020)

Political parties

- California Republican Party

Organizations

- AIPAC
- California College Republicans
- California ProLife Council
- California Rifle and Pistol Association
- Log Cabin Republicans PAC (post-primary)
- National Rifle Association Political Victory Fund
- Riverside County Republican Party
Whitney Shanahan (D)

Organizations

- National Women's Political Caucus

=== Fundraising ===
Campaign finance reports as of February 14, 2024
Candidate	Raised	Spent	Cash on hand
Darrell Issa (R)	$919,404	$440,906	$1,096,087
Stephen Houlahan (D)	$17,046	$20,314	$7,966
Whitney Shanahan (D)	$16,056	$14,561	$1,495
Mike Simon (D)	$123,417 (Note: $109,990 of this total was self-funded by Simon.)	$113,117	$10,300
Source: Federal Election Commission

=== Predictions ===
Source	Ranking	As of
The Cook Political Report	Solid R	February 2, 2023
Inside Elections	Solid R	March 10, 2023
Sabato's Crystal Ball	Safe R	February 23, 2023
Elections Daily	Safe R	February 5, 2024
CNalysis	Solid R	November 16, 2023

=== Polling ===
Poll source	Date(s) administered	Sample size	Margin of error	Darrell Issa (R)	Stephen Houlahan (D)	Undecided
SurveyUSA (Note: Poll sponsored by KGTV and The San Diego Union-Tribune)	June 14–20, 2024	625 (LV)	± 4.8%	56%	34%	10%

=== Results ===
California's 48th congressional district, 2024
Primary election
Party	Candidate	Votes	%
Republican	Darrell Issa (incumbent)	111,510	62.4
Democratic	Stephen Houlahan	26,601	14.9
Democratic	Whitney Shanahan	21,819	12.2
Democratic	Mike Simon	12,950	7.2
Democratic	Matthew Rascon	3,988	2.2
No party preference	Lucinda Jahn	1,959	1.1
Total votes		178,827	100.0
General election
Republican	Darrell Issa (incumbent)	213,625	59.3
Democratic	Stephen Houlahan	146,665	40.7
Total votes		360,290	100.0
Republican hold			

==== By county ====
County	Darrell Issa Republican		Stephen Houlahan Democratic		Margin		Total votes cast
County	#	%	#	%	#	%	Total votes cast
Riverside (part)	71,149	59.70%	48,028	40.30%	23,121	19.40%	119,177
San Diego (part)	142,476	59.09%	98,637	40.91%	43,839	18.18%	241,113
Totals	213,625	59.29%	146,665	40.71%	66,960	18.59%	360,290

== District 49 ==
2024 California's 49th congressional district election
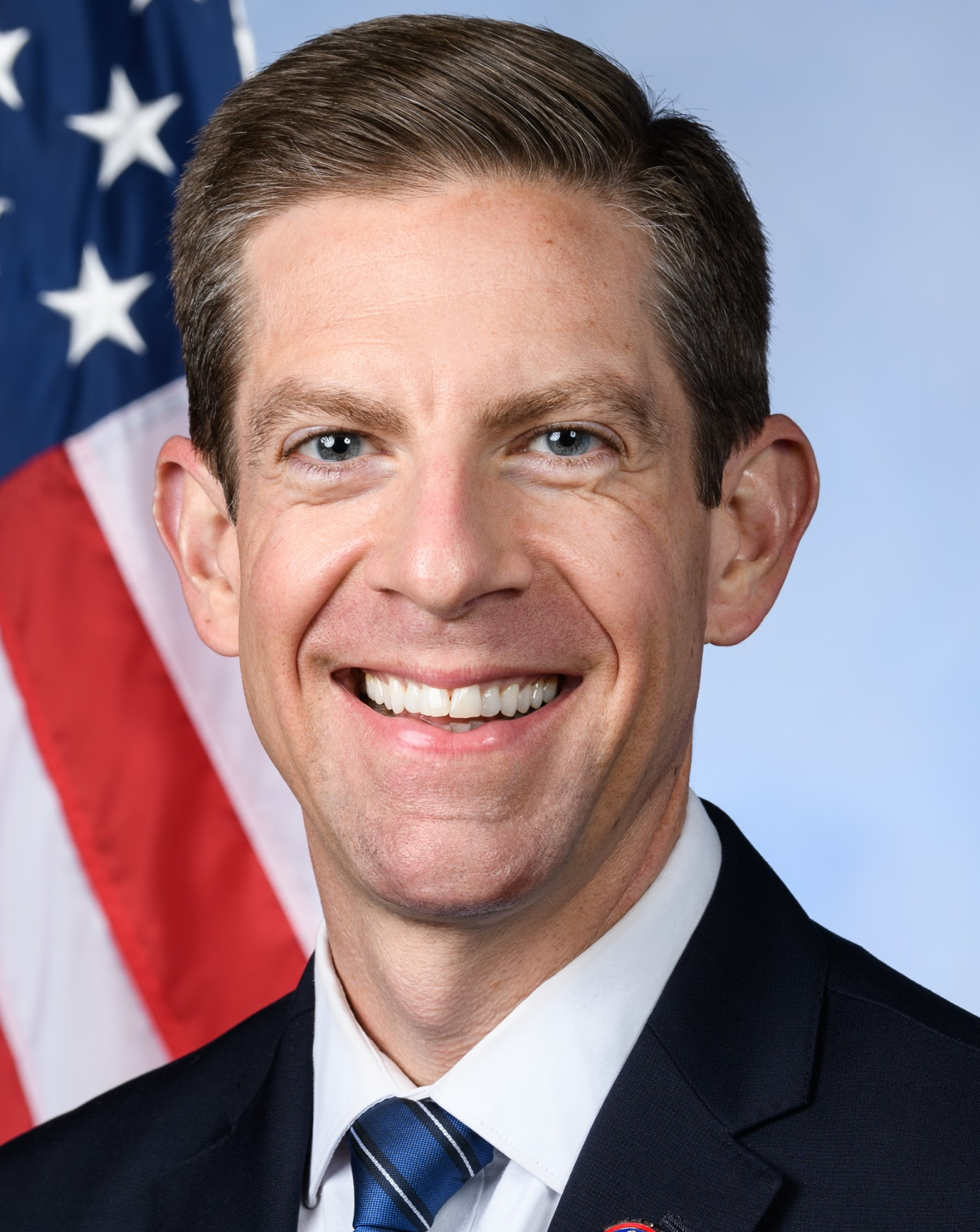

Candidate	Mike Levin	Matt Gunderson
Party	Democratic	Republican
Popular vote	197,397	180,950
Percentage	52.2%	47.8%
- County results Levin: 50–60% Gunderson: 50–60%
U.S. Representative before election
Mike Levin
Democratic
Elected U.S. Representative
Mike Levin
Democratic

The incumbent was Democrat Mike Levin, who was re-elected with 52.6% of the vote in 2022.

=== Candidates ===
Advanced to general

- Matt Gunderson (Republican), auto dealer and runner-up for SD-38 in 2022
- Mike Levin (Democratic), incumbent U.S. representative

Eliminated in primary

- Sheryl Adams (Republican), automotive marketer
- Kate Monroe (Republican), veteran aid nonprofit CEO
- Margarita Wilkinson (Republican), Entravision senior vice president

=== Endorsements ===
Sheryl Adams (R)

U.S. representatives

- Darrell Issa, U.S. representative for California's 48th congressional district (2001−2019, 2021−present)
Matt Gunderson (R)

U.S. representatives

- Newt Gingrich, former Speaker of the U.S. House (1995−1999) from Georgia's 6th congressional district (1979−1999)

State senators

- Brian Jones, state senator for the 40th district (2018−present)
- Janet Nguyen, state senator for the 36th district (2014−present)

Local officials

- Carl DeMaio, former San Diego city councilor (2008–2012)

Organizations

- Log Cabin Republicans PAC (post-primary)
Mike Levin (D)

Political parties

- California Democratic Party
- San Diego County Democratic Party

Organizations

- AIPAC
- Bend the Arc
- Brady PAC
- California Environmental Voters
- California Young Democrats
- Council for a Livable World
- Democratic Majority for Israel
- End Citizens United
- Equality California
- Everytown for Gun Safety Action Fund
- Feminist Majority PAC
- Giffords
- Humane Society Legislative Fund
- J Street PAC
- Jewish Democratic Council of America
- Joint Action Committee for Political Affairs
- League of Conservation Voters
- NARAL Pro-Choice America
- Natural Resources Defense Council
- Orange County Labor Federation
- Planned Parenthood Action Fund
- Population Connection Action Fund
- San Diego Democrats for Equality
- Sierra Club

Labor unions

- AFSCME California
- California Federation of Labor
- California Federation of Teachers
- California Professional Firefighters
- California Teachers Association
- International Brotherhood of Teamsters Joint Council 42
- National Education Association
- National Union of Healthcare Workers
- Orange County Employees Association
- San Diego & Imperial Counties AFL-CIO
- UFCW Local 324
- United Association Local 398
- United Auto Workers
Kate Monroe (R)

Organizations

- California ProLife Council
- California Republican Assembly
Margarita Wilkinson (R)

Local officials

- Chris Cate, former San Diego city councilor from the 6th district (2014−2022)
- Kevin Faulconer, former mayor of San Diego (2014−2020) and candidate for governor of California in 2021
- Kristin Gaspar, former San Diego County supervisor from the 3rd district (2016−2020)
- Rebecca Jones, mayor of San Marcos
- Scott Sherman, former San Diego city councilor from the 7th district (2012−2020)

Organizations

- California College Republicans

Political parties

- American Independent Party

=== Fundraising ===
Campaign finance reports as of February 14, 2024
Candidate	Raised	Spent	Cash on hand
Mike Levin (D)	$2,429,689	$1,342,976	$1,222,164
Sheryl Adams (R)	$241,435 (Note: $160,500 of this total was self-funded by Adams.)	$133,602	$107,832
Matt Gunderson (R)	$1,201,102 (Note: $700,000 of this total was self-funded by Gunderson.)	$1,000,024	$201,078
Kate Monroe (R)	$376,573 (Note: $303,000 of this total was self-funded by Monroe.)	$204,994	$171,578
Margarita Wilkinson (R)	$1,799,386 (Note: $1,475,000 of this total was self-funded by Wilkinson.)	$1,313,920	$487,466
Source: Federal Election Commission

=== Predictions ===
Source	Ranking	As of
The Cook Political Report	Lean D	October 15, 2024
Inside Elections	Lean D	October 31, 2024
Sabato's Crystal Ball	Likely D	September 30, 2024
Elections Daily	Lean D	October 10, 2024
CNalysis	Solid D	October 16, 2024

=== Polling ===
Poll source	Date(s) administered	Sample size	Margin of error	Mike Levin (D)	Matt Gunderson (R)	Other	Undecided
SurveyUSA	October 25–31, 2024	574 (LV)	± 5.0%	51%	38%	3% (Note: "Not Casting a Ballot" with 3%)	8%
1892 Polling (R)	October 5–8, 2024	400 (LV)	± 4.9%	46%	45%	–	9%
SurveyUSA	October 2–6, 2024	617 (LV)	± 4.8%	53%	41%	1% (Note: "Will Not Cast a Ballot" with 1%)	5%
SurveyUSA	June 5–10, 2024	559 (LV)	± 4.8%	50%	40%	–	10%
1892 Polling (R) (Note: Poll sponsored by Gunderson's campaign)	April 9–11, 2024	400 (LV)	± 4.9%	44%	42%	–	14%
SurveyUSA	January 9–15, 2024	650 (LV)	± 4.4%	47%	34%	–	20%
SurveyUSA	January 9–15, 2024	650 (LV)	± 4.4%	43%	12%	17% (Note: Kate Munroe (R) & Margarita Wilkinson (R) with 7%; Sheryl Adams (R) with 3%)	28%

Hypothetical polling

Matt Levin vs. Margarita Wilkinson

Poll source	Date(s) administered	Sample size	Margin of error	Matt Levin (D)	Margarita Wilkinson (R)	Undecided
SurveyUSA	January 9–15, 2024	650 (LV)	± 4.4%	48%	29%	23%

=== Results ===
California's 49th congressional district, 2024
Primary election
Party	Candidate	Votes	%
Democratic	Mike Levin (incumbent)	97,275	51.0
Republican	Matt Gunderson	49,001	25.7
Republican	Margarita Wilkinson	20,900	11.0
Republican	Kate Monroe	19,026	10.0
Republican	Sheryl Adams	4,617	2.4
Total votes		190,819	100.0
General election
Democratic	Mike Levin (incumbent)	197,397	52.2
Republican	Matt Gunderson	180,950	47.8
Total votes		378,347	100.0
Democratic hold			

==== By county ====
County	Mike Levin Democratic		Matt Gunderson Republican		Margin		Total votes cast
County	#	%	#	%	#	%	Total votes cast
Orange (part)	59,928	44.58%	74,512	55.42%	−14,584	−10.85%	134,440
San Diego (part)	137,469	56.36%	106,438	43.64%	31,031	12.72%	243,907
Totals	197,397	52.17%	180,950	47.83%	16,447	4.35%	378,347

== District 50 ==
2024 California's 50th congressional district election
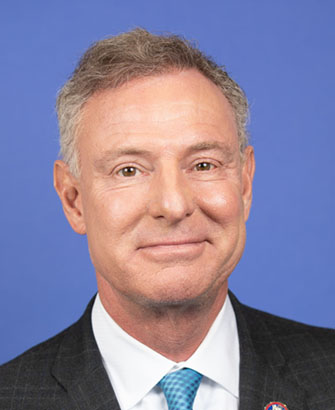

Candidate	Scott Peters	Peter Bono
Party	Democratic	Republican
Popular vote	231,836	128,859
Percentage	64.3%	35.7%
- County results Peters: 60–70%
U.S. Representative before election
Scott Peters
Democratic
Elected U.S. Representative
Scott Peters
Democratic

The incumbent was Democrat Scott Peters, who had represented the district since 2013 and was re-elected with 62.8% of the vote in 2022.

=== Candidates ===
Advanced to general

- Peter Bono (Republican), retired U.S. Navy technician
- Scott Peters (Democratic), incumbent U.S. representative

Eliminated in primary

- Timothy Bilash (Democratic), obstetrician-gynecologist
- Solomon Moss (Republican), home tiling contractor

=== Endorsements ===
Peter Bono (R)

Local officials

- Carl DeMaio, former San Diego city councilor (2008–2012)

Organizations

- California College Republicans
- California Rifle and Pistol Association (post-primary)
Scott Peters (D)

Political parties

- California Democratic Party
- San Diego County Democratic Party

Organizations

- California Environmental Voters
- California Young Democrats
- Equality California
- Humane Society Legislative Fund
- International Franchise Association
- J Street PAC
- League of Conservation Voters
- National Organization for Women PAC
- Planned Parenthood Action Fund (post-primary)
- Population Connection Action Fund
- San Diego Democrats for Equality

Labor unions

- AFSCME California
- Association of Flight Attendants
- California Federation of Labor
- California Federation of Teachers
- California Professional Firefighters
- California Teachers Association
- National Education Association
- San Diego & Imperial Counties AFL-CIO
- United Auto Workers

=== Fundraising ===
Campaign finance reports as of February 14, 2024
Candidate	Raised	Spent	Cash on hand
Timothy Bilash (D)	$27,181 (Note: $26,700 of this total was self-funded by Bilash.)	$26,506	$961
Scott Peters (D)	$1,288,282	$896,445	$2,125,794
Source: Federal Election Commission

=== Predictions ===
Source	Ranking	As of
The Cook Political Report	Solid D	February 2, 2023
Inside Elections	Solid D	March 10, 2023
Sabato's Crystal Ball	Safe D	February 23, 2023
Elections Daily	Safe D	February 5, 2024
CNalysis	Solid D	November 16, 2023

=== Polling ===
Poll source	Date(s) administered	Sample size	Margin of error	Scott Peters (D)	Peter Bono (R)	Undecided
SurveyUSA	June 24–30, 2024	601 (LV)	± 5.0%	51%	33%	17%

=== Results ===
California's 50th congressional district, 2024
Primary election
Party	Candidate	Votes	%
Democratic	Scott Peters (incumbent)	97,601	57.0
Republican	Peter Bono	40,284	23.5
Republican	Solomon Moss	20,252	11.8
Democratic	Timothy Bilash	13,106	7.7
Total votes		171,243	100.0
General election
Democratic	Scott Peters (incumbent)	231,836	64.3
Republican	Peter Bono	128,859	35.7
Total votes		360,695	100.0
Democratic hold			

== District 51 ==
2024 California's 51st congressional district election
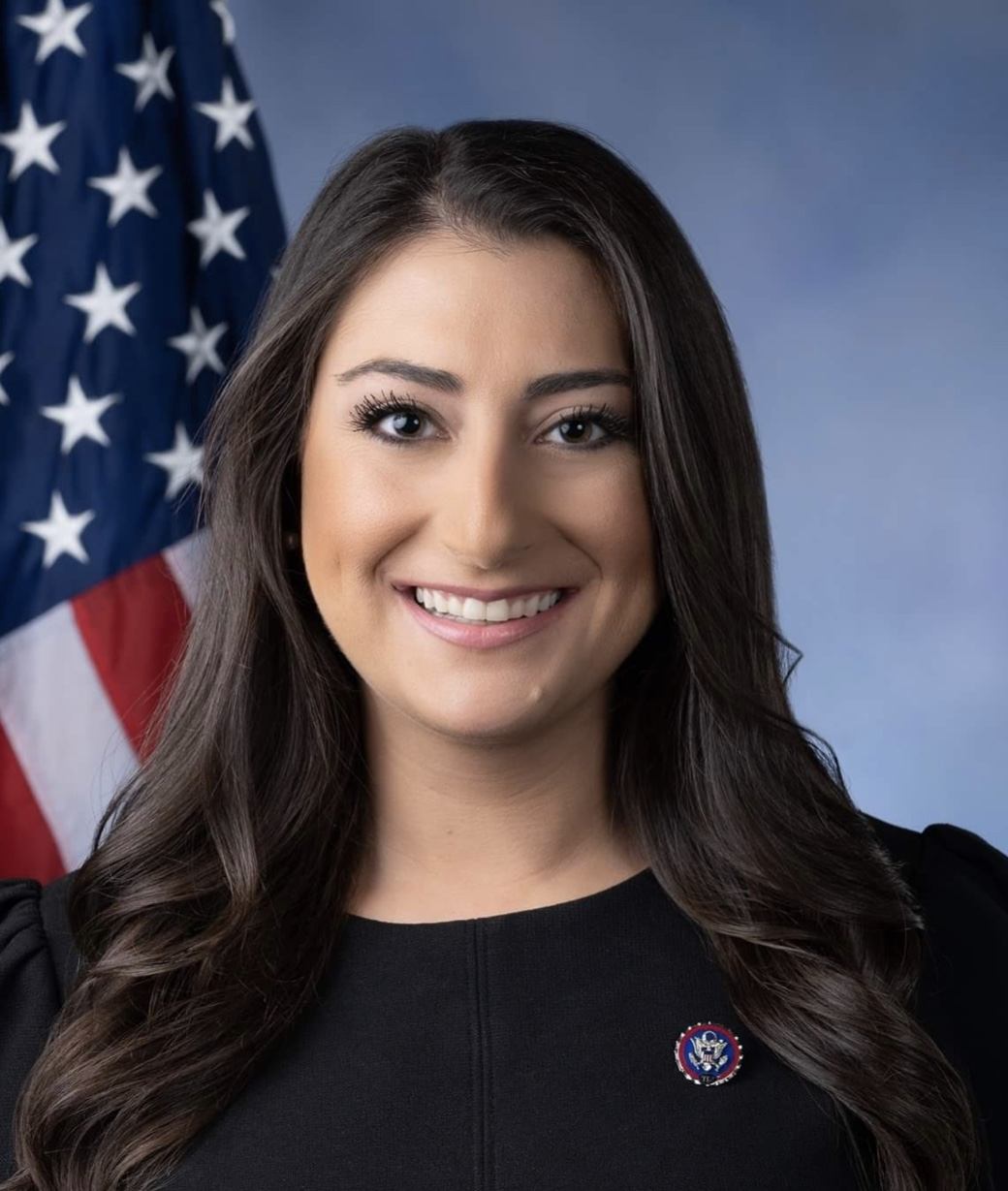

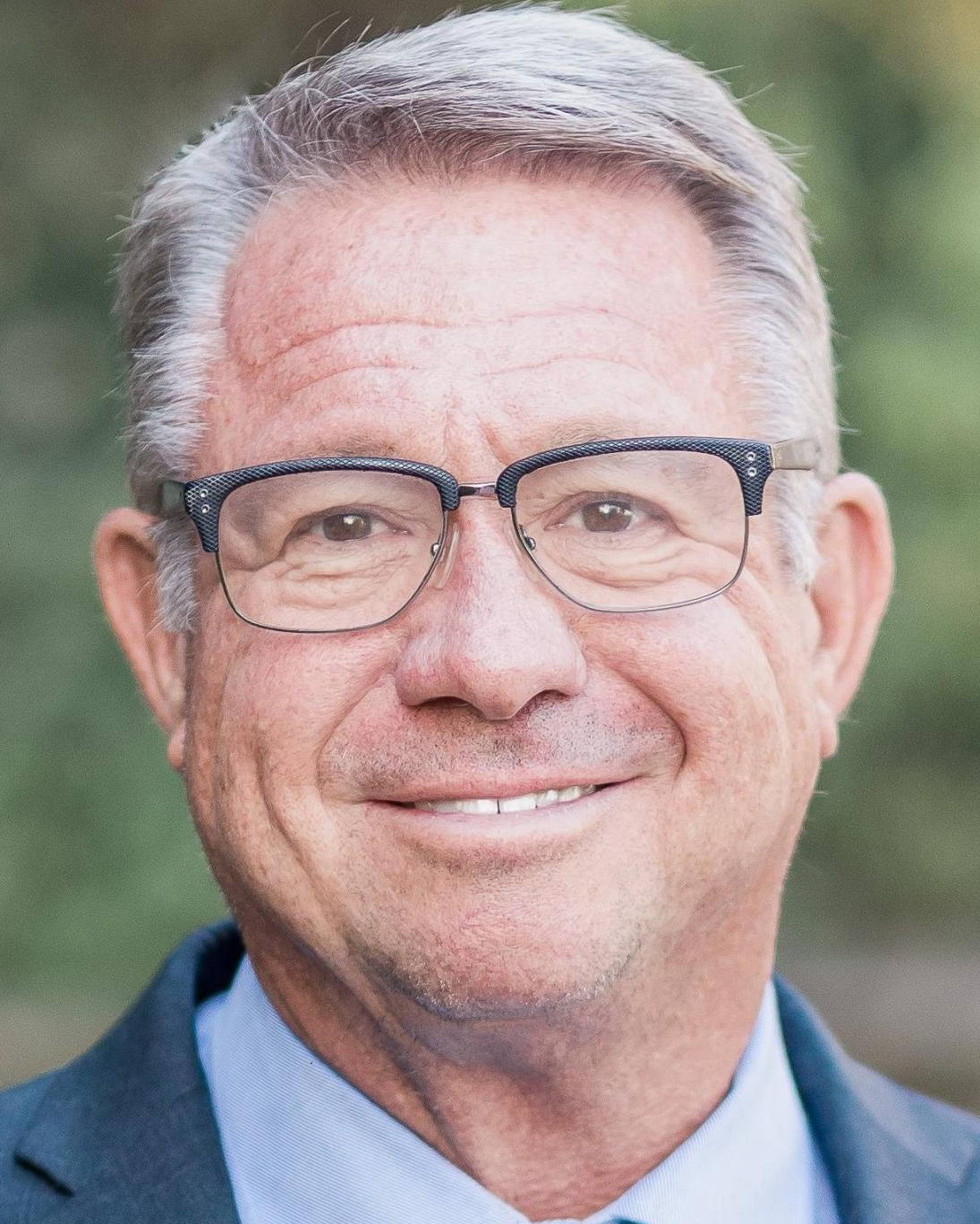
Candidate	Sara Jacobs	Bill Wells
Party	Democratic	Republican
Popular vote	198,835	128,749
Percentage	60.7%	39.3%
- County results Jacobs: 60–70%
U.S. Representative before election
Sara Jacobs
Democratic
Elected U.S. Representative
Sara Jacobs
Democratic

The incumbent was Democrat Sara Jacobs, who had represented the district since 2021 and was re-elected with 61.9% of the vote in 2022.

=== Candidates ===
Advanced to general

- Sara Jacobs (Democratic), incumbent U.S. representative
- Bill Wells (Republican), mayor of El Cajon

Eliminated in primary

- Stan Caplan (no party preference), businessman and Republican runner-up for this district in 2022
- Hilaire Fuji Shioura (no party preference), former Placentia library trustee and perennial candidate

=== Endorsements ===
Stan Caplan (NPP)

Political parties

- American Independent Party
Sara Jacobs (D)

Political parties

- California Democratic Party
- San Diego County Democratic Party

Organizations

- California Environmental Voters
- California Young Democrats
- Council for a Livable World (post-primary)
- Equality California
- Feminist Majority PAC
- Humane Society Legislative Fund
- J Street PAC
- Jewish Democratic Council of America (post-primary)
- Joint Action Committee for Political Affairs
- National Women's Political Caucus
- Natural Resources Defense Council (post-primary)
- Planned Parenthood Action Fund
- Population Connection Action Fund
- San Diego Democrats for Equality
- Sierra Club

Labor unions

- AFSCME California
- California Federation of Labor
- California Federation of Teachers
- California Professional Firefighters
- California Teachers Association
- National Education Association
- National Union of Healthcare Workers
- San Diego & Imperial Counties AFL-CIO
- SEIU United Healthcare Workers West
- United Auto Workers
Bill Wells (R)

U.S. representatives

- Michele Bachmann, former U.S. representative from Minnesota's 6th congressional district (2007–2015)
- Brian Bilbray, former U.S. representative from California's 50th congressional district (1995–2001, 2006–2013)
- Darrell Issa, U.S. representative from California's 48th congressional district (2001–2019, 2021–present)

Local officials

- Carl DeMaio, former San Diego city councilor (2008–2012)
- Steve Vaus, mayor of Poway (2014–present)

Organizations

- California College Republicans
- San Diego County Republican Party
- San Diego East County Chamber of Commerce

Political parties

- California Republican Party

=== Fundraising ===
Campaign finance reports as of February 14, 2024
Candidate	Raised	Spent	Cash on hand
Sara Jacobs (D)	$985,133 (Note: $100,000 of this total was self-funded by Jacobs.)	$864,795	$210,365
Bill Wells (R)	$563,914	$392,408	$178,685
Stan Caplan (NPP)	$41,726 (Note: $3,000 of this total was self-funded by Caplan.)	$34,162	$7,564
Source: Federal Election Commission

=== Primary election ===
==== Polling ====
Poll source	Date(s) administered	Sample size	Margin of error	Stan Caplan (NPP)	Sara Jacobs (D)	Hilaire Shioura (NPP)	Bill Wells (R)	Undecided
SurveyUSA	January 26–31, 2024	562 (LV)	± 4.9%	4%	48%	3%	29%	16%

=== General election ===
==== Predictions ====
Source	Ranking	As of
The Cook Political Report	Solid D	February 2, 2023
Inside Elections	Solid D	March 10, 2023
Sabato's Crystal Ball	Safe D	February 23, 2023
Elections Daily	Safe D	February 5, 2024
CNalysis	Solid D	November 16, 2023

==== Polling ====
Poll source	Date(s) administered	Sample size	Margin of error	Sara Jacobs (D)	Bill Wells (R)	Undecided
SurveyUSA	October 23–27, 2024	521 (LV)	± 5.2%	61%	25%	13% (Note: "Not Casting a Ballot" with 3%)
SurveyUSA	June 10–14, 2024	537 (LV)	± 4.8%	54%	32%	14%
SurveyUSA	January 26–31, 2024	562 (LV)	± 4.9%	55%	34%	11%

Hypothetical polling

Sara Jacobs vs. Stan Caplan

Poll source	Date(s) administered	Sample size	Margin of error	Sara Jacobs (D)	Stan Caplan (NPP)	Undecided
SurveyUSA	January 26–31, 2024	562 (LV)	± 4.9%	56%	24%	20%

=== Results ===
California's 51st congressional district, 2024
Primary election
Party	Candidate	Votes	%
Democratic	Sara Jacobs (incumbent)	90,901	57.4
Republican	Bill Wells	61,923	39.1
No party preference	Stan Caplan	3,164	2.0
No party preference	Hilaire Fuji Shioura	2,496	1.6
Total votes		158,484	100.0
General election
Democratic	Sara Jacobs (incumbent)	198,835	60.7
Republican	Bill Wells	128,749	39.3
Total votes		327,584	100.0
Democratic hold			

== District 52 ==
2024 California's 52nd congressional district election
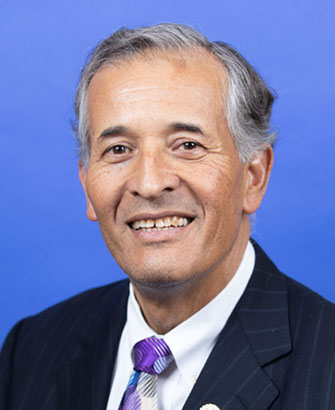

Candidate	Juan Vargas	Justin Lee
Party	Democratic	Republican
Popular vote	172,217	87,501
Percentage	66.3%	33.7%
- County results Vargas: 60–70%
U.S. Representative before election
Juan Vargas
Democratic
Elected U.S. Representative
Juan Vargas
Democratic

The incumbent was Democrat Juan Vargas, who had represented the district since 2013 and was re-elected with 66.7% of the vote in 2022.

=== Candidates ===
Advanced to general

- Justin Lee (Republican), realtor
- Juan Vargas (Democratic), incumbent U.S. representative

=== Endorsements ===
Juan Vargas (D)

Political parties

- California Democratic Party
- San Diego County Democratic Party

Organizations

- AIPAC
- California Environmental Voters
- California Young Democrats
- Democratic Majority for Israel
- Equality California
- Humane Society Legislative Fund
- Planned Parenthood Action Fund (post-primary)
- San Diego Democrats for Equality

Labor unions

- AFSCME California
- Association of Flight Attendants
- California Federation of Labor
- California Federation of Teachers
- California Professional Firefighters
- National Union of Healthcare Workers
- San Diego & Imperial Counties AFL-CIO
- United Auto Workers

=== Fundraising ===
Campaign finance reports as of February 14, 2024
Candidate	Raised	Spent	Cash on hand
Juan Vargas (D)	$458,547	$495,704	$182,387
Source: Federal Election Commission

=== Predictions ===
Source	Ranking	As of
The Cook Political Report	Solid D	February 2, 2023
Inside Elections	Solid D	March 10, 2023
Sabato's Crystal Ball	Safe D	February 23, 2023
Elections Daily	Safe D	February 5, 2024
CNalysis	Solid D	November 16, 2023

=== Polling ===
Poll source	Date(s) administered	Sample size	Margin of error	Juan Vargas (D)	Justin Lee (R)	Undecided
SurveyUSA	June 20–25, 2024	507 (LV)	± 5.5%	57%	25%	19%

=== Results ===
California's 52nd congressional district, 2024
Primary election
Party	Candidate	Votes	%
Democratic	Juan Vargas (incumbent)	62,511	65.0
Republican	Justin Lee	33,611	35.0
Total votes		96,122	100.0
General election
Democratic	Juan Vargas (incumbent)	172,217	66.3
Republican	Justin Lee	87,501	33.7
Total votes		259,718	100.0
Democratic hold			

== Notes ==
Partisan clients
