= Maebe A. Girl =

American drag queen and politician (born 1986)

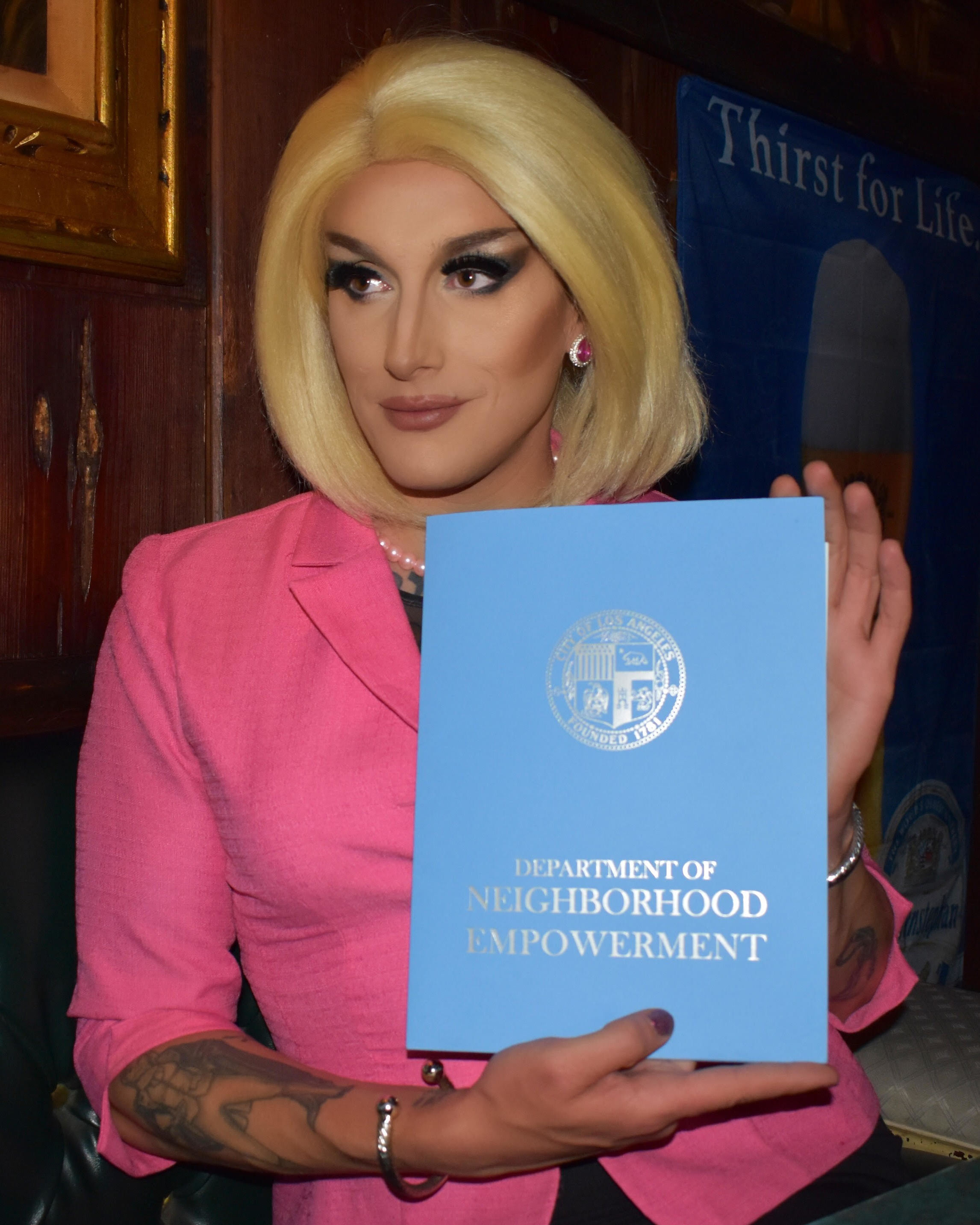

Member of the Silver Lake Neighborhood Council
- Incumbent
- Assumed office May 2019
- Constituency: At-Large (2021–present); Region 5 (2019–2021)

Personal details
- Born: July 27, 1986 (age 40) Pittsburgh, Pennsylvania, U.S.
- Party: Democratic
- Occupation: Drag queen; politician
- Website: maebeforstatesenate.com
- Other names: G. Pudlo; Maebe Pudlo

Maebe A. Girl (also known as G. Pudlo; born July 27, 1986) is an American drag queen and politician. She came to prominence as the first drag queen ever elected to public office in the United States, after being elected to the Silver Lake Neighborhood Council in Los Angeles in 2019. Girl is non-binary and uses she/her and they/them pronouns.

On June 28, 2019, Girl announced a Democratic Party bid for California's 28th congressional district, challenging incumbent Adam Schiff. If successful, Girl would have been the first transgender person ever elected to Congress. She came in third in the primary, and thus did not make it into the general election.

On February 2, 2021, Girl announced that she would run against Schiff again in the 2022 election. Girl placed second in the June 2022 jungle primary and advanced to the general election, becoming the first Democrat running against Schiff to do so. After Schiff announced he would retire from the House of Representatives to run for the Senate in 2024, Girl announced her candidacy for his seat a third time to succeed him.

Under the name Maebe Pudlo, Girl announced a 2026 campaign for the California State Senate in June 2025, to succeed retiring Senator María Elena Durazo.

== Early life and drag career ==
Girl was born in Pittsburgh. She subsequently moved to Chicago, where she did pizza tours of the city. She came out to her parents at 16, and she noted they were supportive. While living in Chicago, after Mayor Richard M. Daley stepped down as mayor in 2011, Girl considered running for mayor, but did not meet the signature requirements to get on ballot. She also volunteered as an overnight supervisor at Lincoln Park Community Center.

Girl later began performing in drag. In 2014, she moved from Chicago to Highland Park, Los Angeles. As host and producer of the Lyric Hyperion Theatre's drag brunch, she became known for doing satirical impressions of political figures, including Melania Trump, Betsy DeVos, Kellyanne Conway, and Sarah Sanders.

Girl is 6 ft 2 in (1.88 m). She is also an ordained minister. In regards to the news coverage about her being a drag queen in elected office, Girl expressed that she understood the tabloid element of her profession and even promoted her campaigns at drag events and in drag, but that there had also "been an overemphasis on the fact that I’m a drag queen and an under-emphasis on the fact that I’m a trans person". She stated that "drag is what I do, trans is who I am."

Girl was featured as a guest on a roundtable discussion for Yes! Magazine on International Transgender Day of Visibility in 2023.

== Political career ==
=== Silver Lake Neighborhood Council ===
After working as an overnight supervisor at a homeless shelter, Girl declared a run for the Silver Lake Neighborhood Council on the basis of addressing the homelessness crisis, supporting LGBTQIA+ rights, and protecting immigrants. Girl ran for Neighborhood Council with a slate of first-time candidates called Silver Lake Progressive, and all eleven candidates on the slate won, winning a majority in the council. She was elected in the election on April 16, 2019, becoming the first known drag queen ever elected to public office.

After her election, Girl formed the Silver Lake LGBTQIA Advocates Committee, which she co-chairs. She soon took on the position on the council of Homelessness Liaison, aiming to bridge the gap between the Homelessness Committee and the rest of the council. As part of this homeless advocacy work, she voted in favor of submitting a Community Impact Statement to Los Angeles City Hall to address homeless encampment clean-ups.

In August 2020, on public comment, Girl endorsed a motion to establish the Los Angeles Commission on Lived Experiences with Homelessness, which would include unhoused people, calling it a “great idea, as long as it’s not conducted in vain,” and emphasizing how the commission would need to be diverse and reflective of the unhoused demographics, with black, brown, Native, and transgender representatives.

=== 2020 congressional election ===
Girl announced on June 28, 2019, that she would be challenging Adam Schiff in the March 3, 2020 primary election for California's 28th congressional district. She said their goal for policy-making was in three parts: "Protect, Advocate, and Legislate". Girl decided to run as a Democrat, challenging Schiff from the left, and receiving the endorsement of progressive groups, including the local branches of Our Revolution.

=== 2022 congressional election ===
Girl ran against Adam Schiff for a second time in the 2022 United States House of Representatives elections for California's 30th congressional district, to which Schiff had been redistricted. She advanced to the general election, finishing second in the primary with 12.9%. She became the first trans nonbinary person to advance to a general election for a House seat, following Misty Snow's record as the first transgender person to become a major party nominee for the United States Senate.

Girl lost against Schiff in the general election, bringing in 28.9% of the vote.

=== 2024 congressional election ===
Girl announced her candidacy for California's 30th congressional district on January 26, 2023. This came after Adam Schiff, the current incumbent, announced his plans to run for the Senate, leaving the congressional district without an incumbent. She placed 5th in the primary and was not on the ballot in November.

=== 2026 California State Senate election ===
On June 9, 2025, she announced her campaign for the 26th district of the California State Senate in 2026.

== Political positions ==
Girl considers herself a progressive, and has likened her policies to those of Bernie Sanders and Alexandria Ocasio-Cortez. She was also inspired by Susan B. Anthony's advocacy for social reforms. Her policies are strongly pro-LGBTQIA+. She has said that dressing in drag is "part of who [she is] as a queer person" and is itself political, saying it "taught [her] how to engage with people". Sitting on the Silver Lake Neighborhood Council's Homelessness Committee, Girl has highlighted homelessness in her campaign and tied it to the high number of homeless LGBTQ youth (40% of total homeless youth identify this way). She supports Medicare for All, a Green New Deal, abortion rights, federally backed housing vouchers for unhoused individuals, and Education for All.

Girl has expressed support for the local Armenian community, condemning the ethnic cleansing of Armenians by Azerbaijan. She has also shown support for local organization GALAS LGBTQ+ Armenian Society.

Girl opposes going to war with Iran, Saudi Arabian-led intervention in Yemen, and increases in defense spending. She has repeatedly expressed support for the abolition of ICE.

=== Endorsements ===
In the 2020 Democratic Party presidential primaries, Girl posted on social media in support of the second presidential campaign of Bernie Sanders. In the 2022 Los Angeles mayoral election, Girl endorsed twenty-year old activist Alex Gruenenfelder. In the 2024 Democratic Party presidential primaries, Girl endorsed the longshot campaign of Marianne Williamson against incumbent President Joe Biden.

== Electoral history ==
2020 United States House of Representatives election California's 28th congressional district
Primary election
| Party | Candidate | Votes | % |
|---|---|---|---|
| Democratic | Adam Schiff (incumbent) | 110,251 | 59.57 |
| Republican | Eric Early | 23,243 | 12.56 |
| Democratic | Maebe A. Girl | 22,129 | 11.96 |
| Independent | Jennifer Barbosa | 10,421 | 5.63 |
| Republican | William Bodell | 7,093 | 3.83 |
| Democratic | Sal Genovese | 6,294 | 3.40 |
| Democratic | Ara Khachig Manoogian | 3,920 | 1.78 |
| Democratic | Chad D. Anderson | 2,359 | 1.27 |
| Total votes | | 185,080 | 100 |

2022 United States House of Representatives election California's 30th congressional district
Primary election
| Party | Candidate | Votes | % |
|---|---|---|---|
| Democratic | Adam Schiff (incumbent) | 102,290 | 62.45 |
| Democratic | Maebe A. Girl | 21,053 | 12.85 |
| Republican | Ronda Kennedy | 13,953 | 8.52 |
| Republican | Patrick Lee Gipson | 10,529 | 6.43 |
| Republican | Johnny J. Nalbandian | 7,693 | 4.70 |
| Republican | Paloma Zuniga | 2,614 | 1.60 |
| Democratic | Sal Genovese | 2,612 | 1.59 |
| Green | William "Gunner" Meurer | 1,598 | 0.98 |
| American Independent | Tony Rodriguez | 1,460 | 0.89 |
| Total votes | | 163,802 | 100 |
General election
| Democratic | Adam Schiff (incumbent) | 150,100 | 71.1 |
| Democratic | G "Maebe A. Girl" Pudlo | 60,968 | 28.9 |
| Total votes | | 211,068 | 100.0 |

2024 United States House of Representatives election California's 30th congressional district
| Party | Candidate | Votes | % |
|---|---|---|---|
| Democratic | Laura Friedman | 46,278 | 30.1 |
| Republican | Alex Balekian | 26,801 | 17.4 |
| Democratic | Anthony Portantino | 20,434 | 13.3 |
| Democratic | Mike Feuer | 18,858 | 12.3 |
| Democratic | Maebe A. Girl | 15,761 | 10.2 |
| Republican | Emilio Martinez | 6,768 | 4.4 |
| Democratic | Ben Savage | 6,133 | 4.0 |
| Democratic | Nick Melvoin | 4,122 | 2.7 |
| Democratic | Jirair Ratevosian | 2,887 | 1.9 |
| Democratic | Sepi Shyne | 2,124 | 1.4 |
| Democratic | Courtney Najera | 1,164 | 0.8 |
| No party preference | Joshua Bocanegra | 777 | 0.5 |
| Democratic | Steve Dunwoody | 722 | 0.5 |
| Democratic | Francesco Arreaga | 531 | 0.3 |
| Democratic | Sal Genovese | 440 | 0.3 |
| Total votes | | 153,805 | 100.0 |

== See also ==
- List of transgender public officeholders in the United States
