= 2024 California's 30th congressional district election =

- November 5, 2024
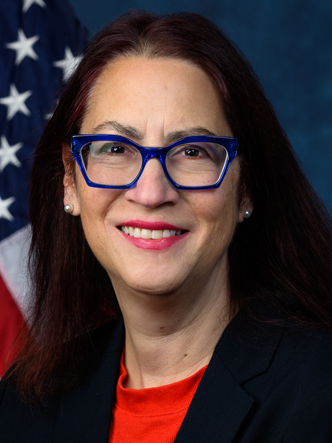

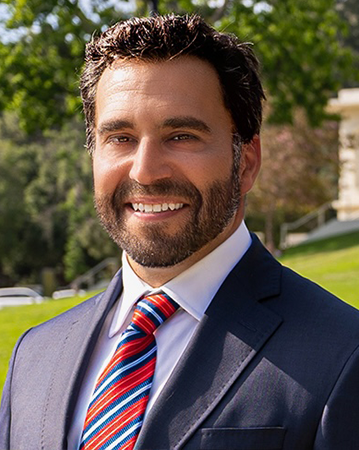
Candidate	Laura Friedman	Alex Balekian
Party	Democratic	Republican
Popular vote	213,100	98,539
Percentage	68.4%	31.6%
U.S. Representative before election
Adam Schiff
Democratic
Elected U.S. Representative
Laura Friedman
Democratic

The 2024 California's 30th congressional district election was held on November 5, 2024, to elect the United States representative for California's 30th congressional district, concurrently with elections for the other U.S. House districts in California and the rest of the country, the 2024 U.S. Senate race in California, other elections to the United States Senate, and various state and local elections. The nonpartisan primary election was held on March 5, 2024, concurrently with the Super Tuesday presidential primaries. Democratic state assemblywoman Laura Friedman and Republican physician Alex Balekian advanced to the general election.

A wide field of candidates ran to succeed Schiff, with 12 Democrats, two Republicans, and one independent participating in the March 5 primary. Several prominent Democrats competed in the primary, including state Senator Anthony Portantino, former Los Angeles City Attorney Mike Feuer, and Silver Lake neighborhood councilor Maebe A. Girl.

Incumbent Adam Schiff, a Democrat who was re-elected with 72.1% of the vote in 2022 against another Democrat, who was not seeking re-election, instead choosing to run for the U.S. Senate. A Democrat who unseated incumbent Republican James Rogan in 2000, Schiff's profile rose significantly during the presidency of Donald Trump, owing to Schiff's role as a lead impeachment manager in the first impeachment trial of Donald Trump, his service on the January 6 Committee, and his frequent appearances on MSNBC.

The 30th district is considered to be a deeply blue urban district and, as a result, safe for the Democrats. Joe Biden won it with over 72% of the vote in the 2020 presidential election. It is primarily based in Los Angeles and includes the neighborhoods of Atwater Village, East Hollywood, Echo Park, Elysian Valley, Hollywood, Hollywood Hills, Larchmont Village, Los Feliz, Mid-Wilshire, Miracle Mile, Shadow Hills, Silver Lake, Sunland-Tujunga, Universal City, and West Hollywood. It also encompasses Burbank, Glendale, and Pasadena.

== Primary election ==
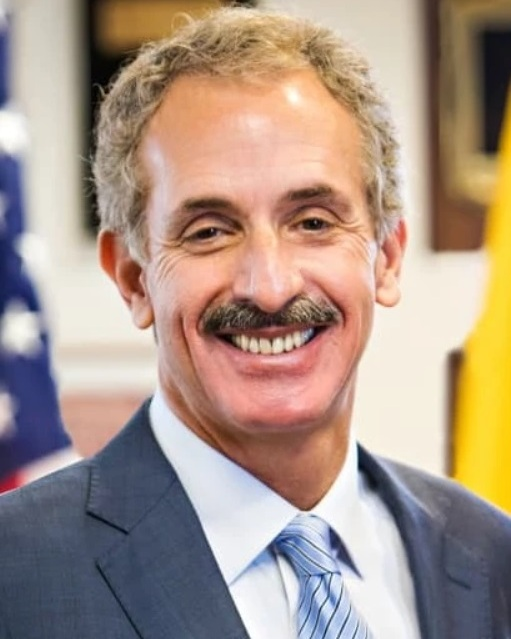
Mike Feuer

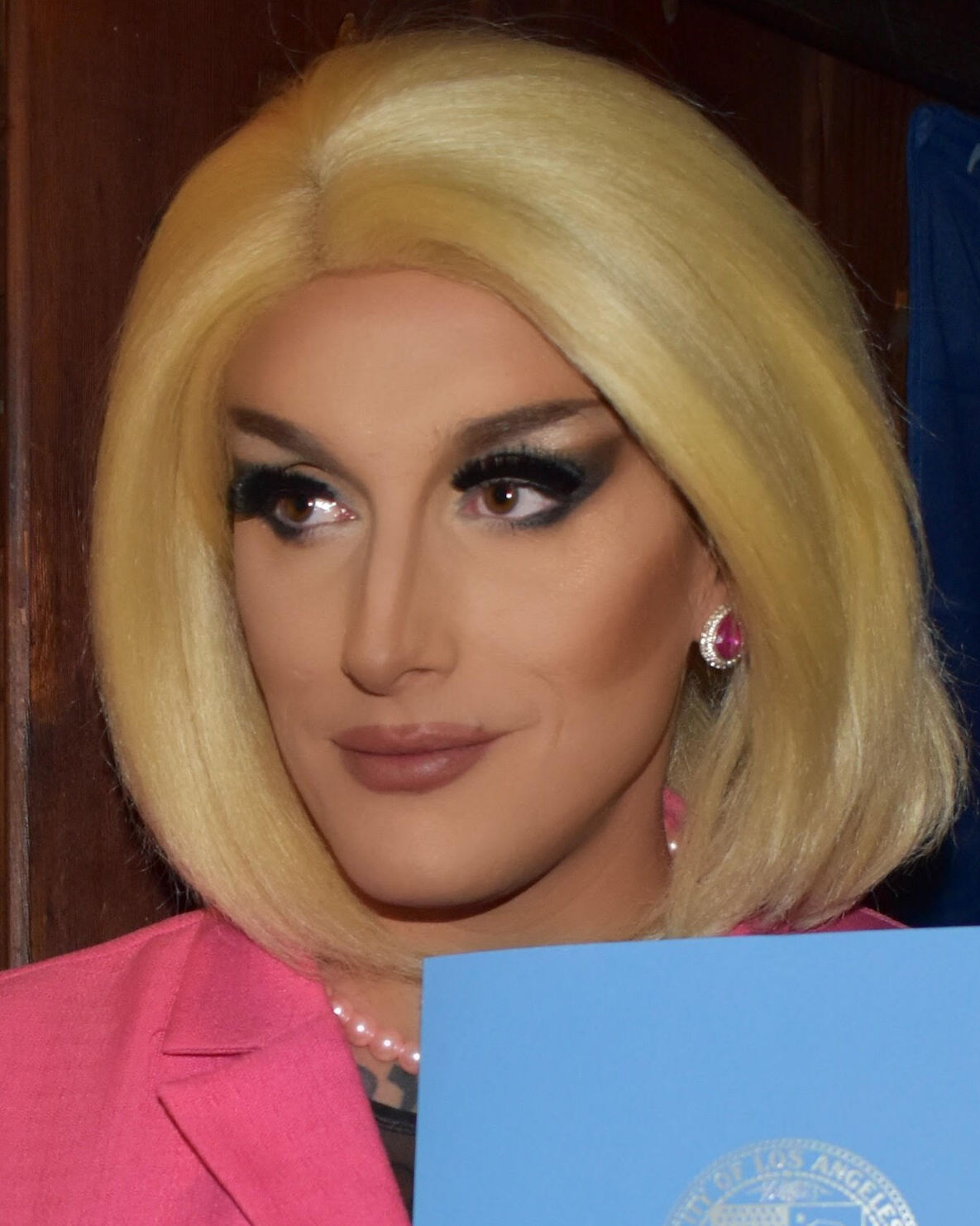
Maebe A. Girl

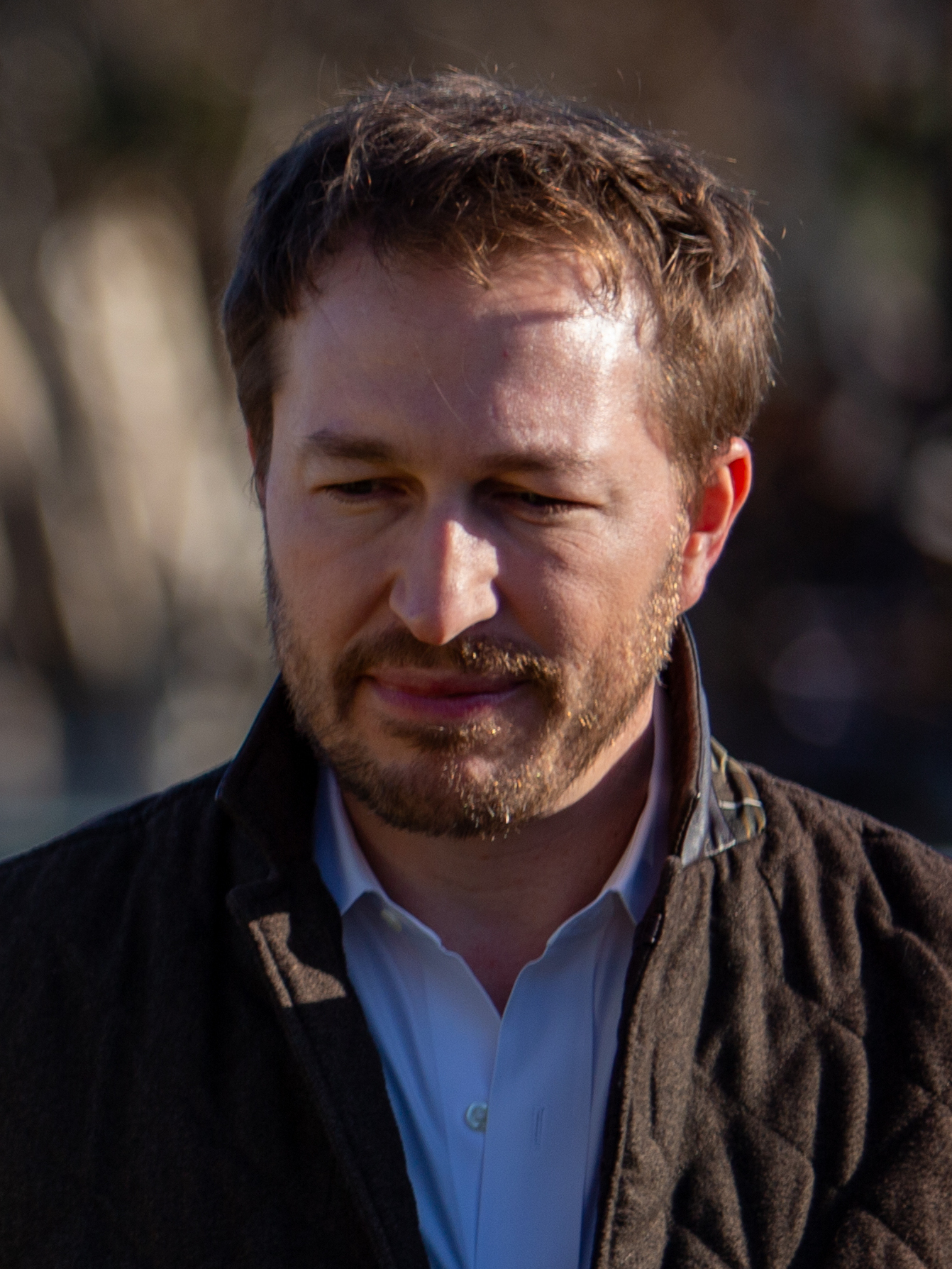
Nick Melvoin

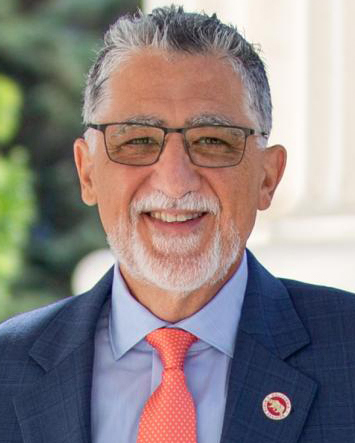
Anthony Portantino

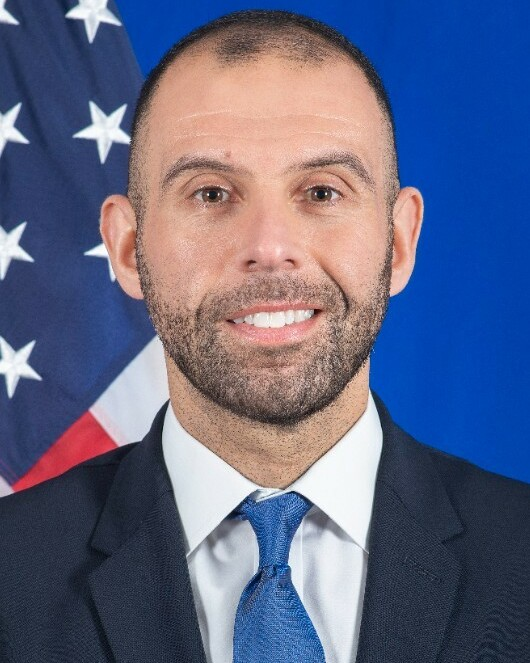
Jirair Ratevosian

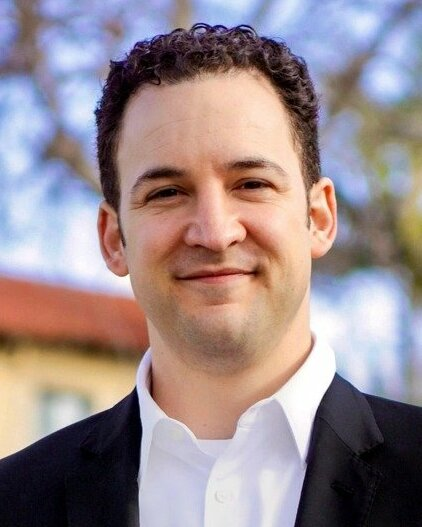
Ben Savage

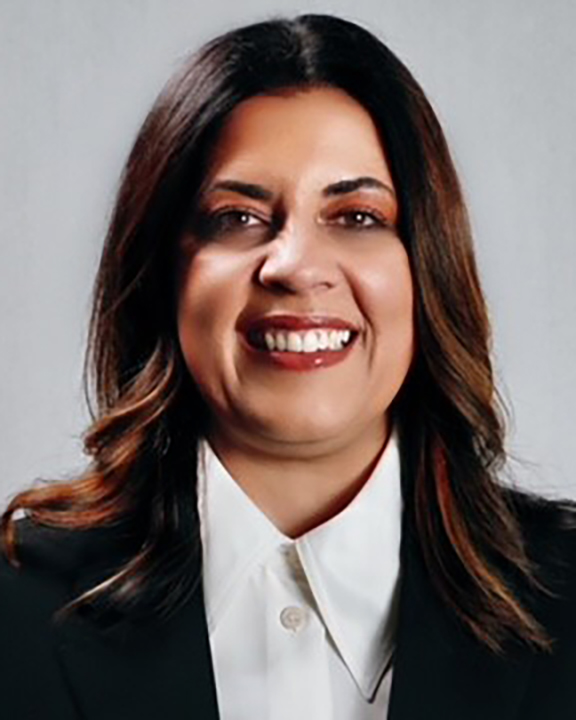
Sepi Shyne

=== Candidates ===
==== Advanced to general ====
- Alex Balekian (Republican), physician
- Laura Friedman (Democratic), state assemblywoman from the 43rd district

==== Eliminated in primary ====
- Francisco Arreaga (Democratic), former policy advisor to U.S. Representative Dan Goldman
- Joshua Bocanegra (no party preference), software developer
- Steve Dunwoody (Democratic), government affairs executive and former special assistant to the U.S. deputy secretary of energy
- Mike Feuer (Democratic), former Los Angeles city attorney
- Sal Genovese, community services director and perennial candidate
- Maebe A. Girl (Democratic), Silver Lake neighborhood council board member and runner-up for this district in 2022
- Emilio Martinez (Republican), television producer
- Nick Melvoin (Democratic), member of the Los Angeles Board of Education
- Courtney Najera (Democratic), beautician
- Anthony Portantino (Democratic), state senator from the 25th district
- Jirair Ratevosian (Democratic), former senior advisor at the U.S. Department of State and former legislative director for U.S. Representative Barbara Lee
- Ben Savage (Democratic), actor known for Boy Meets World
- Sepi Shyne (Democratic), mayor of West Hollywood

==== Declined ====
- Paul Krekorian (Democratic), president of the Los Angeles City Council
- Adam Schiff (Democratic), incumbent U.S. representative (ran for U.S. Senate)

=== Endorsements ===
Alex Balekian (R)

Political parties

- American Independent Party
- California Republican Party

Organizations

- California College Republicans
- Howard Jarvis Taxpayers Association PAC
- Log Cabin Republicans
Joshua Bocanegra (NPP)

Organizations

- Vote Common Good (co-endorsement with Feuer and Ratevosian)
Mike Feuer (D)

U.S. representatives

- Gabby Giffords, U.S. representative from Arizona's 8th congressional district (2007–2012)

Local officials

- Karen Bass, mayor of Los Angeles (2022–present) and former U.S. representative from CA-37 (2011–2022)
- Sheila Kuehl, former chair of the Los Angeles County Board of Supervisors (2017–2018) from the 3rd district (2014–2022)

Organizations

- Giffords
- Vote Common Good (co-endorsement with Bocanegra and Ratevosian)

Newspapers

- Los Angeles Sentinel
Laura Friedman (D)

Statewide officials

- Eleni Kounalakis, lieutenant governor of California (2019–present)

U.S. representatives

- Pramila Jayapal, U.S. representative from Washington's 7th congressional district (2017–present)
- Mark Pocan, U.S. representative from Wisconsin's 2nd congressional district (2013–present
- Jamie Raskin, U.S. representative from Maryland's 8th congressional district (2017–present)

Local officials

- Bill Paparian, former mayor of Pasadena (1995–1997) (no party preference)

Organizations

- Americans for Democratic Action Southern California
- Center for Biological Diversity Action Fund
- Congressional Progressive Caucus PAC
- EMILY's List
- Feminist Majority PAC
- League of Conservation Voters
- National Organization for Women PAC
- National Women's Political Caucus

Labor unions

- National Nurses United

Newspapers

- Los Angeles Times
Maebe A. Girl (D)

Local officials

- Eunisses Hernandez, Los Angeles city councilor from the 1st district (2022–present)

Individuals

- Howie Klein, former president of Reprise Records (1989–2001) and adjunct professor at McGill University
- Heather Digby Parton, political blogger
- Marianne Williamson, author and 2020 and 2024 Democratic presidential candidate

Organizations

- Sunrise Movement Los Angeles
Nick Melvoin (D)

Newspapers and other media

- Daily Breeze
- Los Angeles Daily News
- The Orange County Register
- Pasadena Star-News
- San Gabriel Valley Tribune
Anthony Portantino (D)

Organizations

- Armenian National Committee of America-Western Region

Labor unions

- Actors' Equity Association
- Association of Flight Attendants
- California Federation of Teachers
- California State University Employees Union
- IBEW Local 11
- International Brotherhood of Teamsters Joint Council 42
- SEIU United Healthcare Workers West
- Service Employees International Union California
Jirair Ratevosian (D)

U.S. representatives

- Barney Frank, former U.S. representative from Massachusetts (1981–2013)
- Mike Honda, former U.S. representative from California (2001–2017)

Organizations

- Harvey Milk LGBTQ Democratic Club
- Peace Action
- Vote Common Good (co-endorsement with Bocanegra and Feuer)
Ben Savage (D)

Individuals

- Matthew Lawrence, actor
- Maitland Ward, actress
Sepi Shyne (D)

Organizations

- LPAC
Declined to endorse

Political parties

- California Democratic Party
- California ProLife Council
- Stonewall Democrats

=== Polling ===
Poll source	Date(s) administered	Sample size (Note: Key: A – all adults RV – registered voters LV – likely voters V – unclear)	Margin of error	Mike Feuer (D)	Laura Friedman (D)	Anthony Portantino (D)	Jirair Ratevosian (D)	Ben Savage (D)	Other	Undecided
RMG Research Group (Note: Poll sponsored by U.S. Term Limits)	September 8–11, 2023	400 (LV)	± 4.5%	4%	16%	6%	2%	2%	12% (Note: Nick Melvoin (D) with 1%; Sepi Shyne (D) with 0%; "Other" with 11%; "Would not vote" with 1%)	58%

=== Fundraising ===
Campaign finance reports as of February 14, 2024
Candidate	Raised	Spent	Cash on hand
Francisco Arreaga (D)	$4,142	$3,289	$852
Steve Dunwoody (D)	$25,990 (Note: $15,769 of this total was self-funded by Dunwoody.)	$24,894	$1,096
Mike Feuer (D)	$1,377,880	$1,116,181	$261,699
Laura Friedman (D)	$1,087,029	$853,560	$233,469
Maebe A. Girl (D)	$109,514	$97,719	$13,993
Nick Melvoin (D)	$1,438,780	$1,008,900	$429,879
Courtney Najera (D)	$2,566	$2,025	$540
Anthony Portantino (D)	$1,621,817 (Note: $100,000 of this total was self-funded by Portantino.)	$1,042,341	$579,476
Jirair Ratevosian (D)	$298,509	$240,291	$58,217
Ben Savage (D)	$1,373,820 (Note: $1,077,000 of this total was self-funded by Savage.)	$1,013,920	$359,544
Sepi Shyne (D)	$388,758	$327,409	$61,349
Alex Balekian (R) (Note: Did not file for Q4)	$107,852 (Note: $30,100 of this total was self-funded by Balekian.)	$100,696	$27,422
Emilio Martinez (R)	$1,830 (Note: $1,525 of this total was self-funded by Martinez.)	$1,805	$0
Joshua Bocanegra (NPP)	$7,786	$3,730	$0
Source: Federal Election Commission

=== Debate ===
2024 California's 30th congressional district primary election debates
No.	Date	Host	Moderator	Link	Participants									
P Participant A Absent N Non-invitee I Invitee W Withdrawn														
P Participant A Absent N Non-invitee I Invitee W Withdrawn					Arreaga	Balekian	Dunwoody	Feuer	Friedman	Girl	Melvoin	Portantino	Ratevosian	Shyne
1	February 14, 2024	Ebell of Los Angeles	Elex Michaelson	YouTube	P	P	P	P	P	P	P	P	P	P

=== Results ===
2024 California's 30th congressional district primary
Party	Candidate	Votes	%
Democratic	Laura Friedman	46,278	30.1
Republican	Alex Balekian	26,801	17.4
Democratic	Anthony Portantino	20,434	13.3
Democratic	Mike Feuer	18,858	12.3
Democratic	Maebe A. Girl	15,761	10.2
Republican	Emilio Martinez	6,768	4.4
Democratic	Ben Savage	6,133	4.0
Democratic	Nick Melvoin	4,122	2.7
Democratic	Jirair Ratevosian	2,887	1.9
Democratic	Sepi Shyne	2,124	1.4
Democratic	Courtney Najera	1,164	0.8
No party preference	Joshua Bocanegra	777	0.5
Democratic	Steve Dunwoody	722	0.5
Democratic	Francesco Arreaga	531	0.3
Democratic	Sal Genovese	440	0.3
Total votes		153,805	100.0

== General election ==
=== Predictions ===
Source	Ranking	As of
The Cook Political Report	Solid D	February 2, 2023
Inside Elections	Solid D	March 10, 2023
Sabato's Crystal Ball	Safe D	February 23, 2023
Elections Daily	Safe D	June 8, 2023
CNalysis	Solid D	November 16, 2023

=== Post-primary endorsements ===
Laura Friedman (D)

Organizations

- AIPAC
- Democratic Majority for Israel
- Equality California
- Everytown for Gun Safety
- Natural Resources Defense Council
- Reproductive Freedom for All
- Vote Mama
Alex Balekian (R)

Local officials

- Kathryn Barger, Los Angeles County supervisor (2016–present)
- Ara Najarian, Glendale city councilor (2005–present)

Organizations

- Log Cabin Republicans PAC

Labor unions

- Association for Los Angeles Deputy Sheriffs

Individuals

- Vivek Ramaswamy, entrepreneur and former 2024 presidential candidate

=== Results ===
2024 California's 30th congressional district election
Party	Candidate	Votes	%
Democratic	Laura Friedman	213,100	68.38%
Republican	Alex Balekian	98,559	31.62%
Total votes		311,659	100.00%
Democratic hold			

==== By county ====
County	Laura Friedman Democratic		Alex Balekian Republican		Margin		Total votes cast
County	#	%	#	%	#	%	Total votes cast
Los Angeles (part)	213,100	68.38%	98,559	31.62%	114,541	36.75%	311,659
Totals	213,100	68.38%	98,559	31.62%	114,541	36.75%	311,659

== Notes ==
Partisan clients
