= The Untold (film) =

- DVD cover bearing the title used when it ran on the SyFy Channel, Sasquatch
- Directed by: Jonas Quastel
- Written by: Jonas Quastel; Chris Lanning
- Story by: Jonas Quastel
- Produced by: Rob Clark; Craig Denton
- Starring: Lance Henriksen; Andrea Roth; Erica Parker; Russel Ferrier; Phil Granger
- Cinematography: Shawn Lawless
- Edited by: Gabriel Wrye; Grace Yuen
- Music by: Larry Seymour; Tal Bergman
- Distributed by: Columbia TriStar
- Release date: May 2002
- Running time: 86 minutes
- Country: Canada
- Language: English

The Untold is a 2002 Canadian adventure horror film independently produced in Canada written and directed by Jonas Quastel. The film is known under several different titles depending on the date and location of its release, with it being known as Sasquatch for English versions such as the Canadian DVD release (with the French Canadian title being known as Inexplicable) and airings on the SyFy Channel along with being known as Sasquatch: la créature de la forêt in France. It was first released in France in May 2002. It was released on March 11, 2003 in Canada and the United States. It was panned by critics, with the writing, pacing, Quastel's directing and performances receiving most of the criticisms.

== Plot ==
A plane carrying a small crew and Bio-Comp researcher Tara Knowles malfunctions and crashlands in the Canadian wilderness. The survivors encounter a monster that viciously attacks them. After several weeks of unsuccessful rescue missions, Harlan Knowles, Tara's father and a Bio-Comp executive, organizes his own rescue team: computer engineer Plazz, insurance representative Marla Lawson, survivalist Winston Burg, forensic investigator Nikki Adams, and local mountain man Clayton Tyne.

On the way to the crash site, they set up camp. At night, Marla is attacked by what Clayton determines was a grizzly bear. The next day, they come across the bear corpse, its neck broken by a nearby boulder that's strangely too heavy for a human to pick up much less throw. At sunset, a thunderstorm approaches, forcing the group to take refuge in a cave. They find drawings, which Nikki determines are made with blood, and only a few months old. Harlan finds a piece of Tara's necklace.

After another day of searching, they camp near a natural hot spring. Marla confronts Harlan in private. She knows Tara is in possession of a prototype for an important new project. If it is not retrieved, Bio-Comp is practically bankrupt. She offers to keep quiet in return for $30 million in Bio-Comp stock. Meanwhile, Clayton confronts Burg about the flaws he made while tracking, and calls into question the claims in Burg's survival books. An angry Burg threatens Clayton.

The following day, the group locates the crash site but only finds a piece of the fuselage. Following a conspicuous track, the group finds the plane wreck, hidden under thick foliage. They find a crewmember's a severed arm, still holding a pistol. Nearby, Burg finds "Huxley", the prototype. It is able to instantly analyze the genetic history and makeup of any organic material on Earth. Plazz powers on Huxley and finds it was used on some blood sample shortly after the crash. The machine shows the blood belongs to a Sasquatch.

That night, the creature watches the group until they hear it grunt, a drunken Burg hears a noise and randomly shoots into the forest, narrowly missing others. He hits the creature, which lets out a roar. Harlan fires Burg and promotes Clayton to their head guide. Infuriated, Burg feebly attacks Clayton but quickly gives up; the others leaving him alone at the campfire. Burg cries out as the Sasquatch grabs him. Harlan reviews tapes found in the fuselage and deduces the crash killed a Sasquatch, resulting in its family member (the same Sasquatch that's been shadowing the group these last few days) killing the crew in revenge. Clayton investigates Burg's cry and finds a massive den with Burg's body as well as several decomposing corpses, including Tara's.

As they bury the bodies, the Sasquatch watches them. Marla steals Huxley but the Sasquatch easily catches up, attacks, and kills her. The others find her brutalized body and Harlan retrieves Huxley. Clayton and the others advise Harlan to leave Huxley behind. They suspect the Sasquatch knows the machine carries proof of its existence, which it does not want. Unwilling to leave Huxley, Harlan splits from the others, taking responsibility of avenging the death of his daughter himself so the others can safely escape. Harlan leads the Sasquatch on a chase through the woods until it confronts him head on, after the fight, he is knocked unconscious by the Sasquatch and awakens next to the grave of its mate, which was indeed killed by the plane. Confronted by the Sasquatch, Harlan shoots and destroys the machine, at which point the Sasquatch leaves him alone.

A title card explains that, upon returning to society, Clayton, Nikki, and Harlan all denied Plazz’s claims of a Sasquatch encounter.

== Cast ==
- Lance Henriksen as Harlan Knowles - President & CEO of Bio-Comp Technologies; searching for his missing daughter and some lost research equipment
- Andrea Roth as Marla Lawson - of Browning & Burrows Underwriters, NY; funding the search believing it would be cheaper to find the lost equipment than paying the insurance coverage
- Russel Ferrier as Clayton Tyne - "Mountain man", the search's guide and tracker
- Philip Granger as Winston Burg - Author of In the Company of Lions and other survivalist books
- Jeremy Radick as Plazz - Bio-Comp computer engineer
- Mary Mancini as Nikki Adams - Forensic investigator and crash analyst
- Taras Kostyuk as Sasquatch the creature monster vengeful kill people
- Erica Parker as Tara Knowles - Harlan's daughter, goes missing along with the rest of her crew in the Canadian wilderness

== Release ==
The film was released in theaters and on DVD on March 11, 2003. Lionsgate later released the film on DVD on June 4, 2014.

== Reception ==
Critical reception for the film has been mostly negative. Patrick Naugle from DVD Verdict gave the film a negative review calling the film "a paper-thin idea stretched into a feature length film". Scott Weinberg from eFilmCritic.com awarded the film 1 star out of 4 criticizing the film's lack of logic and the absence of the title monster through most of the film. Digital Retribution.com panned the film stating, "Granted, some of the stuff looks cool, but because so much fails, the film just comes off as DESPERATELY trying to be stylized". The site also criticized Quastel's lack of point and originality. Nearly a decade after the film was released on DVD, it was critiqued in a review by MTV.com in a segment called "Eric's Bad Movies", implying the opinion of the review. Most of the review is an analysis of the film's plot and the actors' performances are criticized in a tongue-in-cheek manner that argues the film is both uninspired and "tediously generic".
