= Island Heat: Stranded =

- Written by: Brian Hurwitz; Matt Dorff
- Directed by: Kern Konwiser
- Starring: Erica Durance; Brienne De Beau; Jack Hartnett; Michelle Jones
- Music by: Andrew Keresztes
- Country of origin: United States
- Original language: English

Production
- Producers: Mike Stevens; Barry Tropp; Kip Konwiser
- Cinematography: P.J. López
- Editor: Nick Link
- Running time: 120 minutes
- Production company: Dolphin Entertainment

Original release
- Network: Lifetime Television
- Release: June 5, 2006

Island Heat: Stranded is a 2006 Lifetime Television thriller film. The film was directed by Kern Konwiser and produced by his brother Kip Konwiser. It was released in United States on June 5, 2006, on Lifetime Television and was released on December 7, 2007, in Hungary. The film stars, Erica Durance, Brienne De Beau and Jack Hartnett.

== Plot ==
A bride-to-be and her four bridesmaids travel to an exotic Caribbean island for a bachelorette party. After arriving at the luxurious resort, the women take a boat ride to a secluded island, where they can bask in sun and sand. The captain of the boat forgets to pick the girls up, leaving them stranded on the island, forcing them to use a deserted house as a makeshift shelter. That quickly turns into a nightmare when the women begin to disappear one by one.

== Cast ==
- Erica Durance as Carina
- Brienne De Beau as Regan
- Jack Hartnett as Anthony
- Michelle Jones as Nicole
- Jessica Lauren as Lynette
- Vanessa Millon as Isabel
- Ashley Totin as Danielle Sanders

== Production ==
Island Heat: Stranded was filmed in Puerto Rico.
