= Girl in the Shed: The Kidnapping of Abby Hernandez =

2022 American TV film

- Screenplay by: Michael Vickerman
- Directed by: Jessica Harmon
- Starring: Lindsay Navarro; Ben Savage; Erica Durance
- Music by: Kevin Blumenfeld
- Country of origin: United States
- Original language: English

Production
- Executive producers: Abby Hernandez; Stacy Mandelberg; Michael Vickerman
- Cinematography: Mike Kam
- Running time: 87 minutes
- Production companies: Johnson Production Group; Sprott Productions I

Original release
- Network: Lifetime
- Release: February 26, 2022

Girl in the Shed: The Kidnapping of Abby Hernandez is a Lifetime television network film that aired as part of its "Ripped from the Headlines" feature films and starring Lindsay Navarro, Ben Savage, and Erica Durance. It is based on the true story of the kidnapping of Abby Hernandez at the hands of Nathaniel Kibby. The film premiered on Lifetime on February 26, 2022.

== Plot ==
On October 9, 2013, 14-year-old Abby Hernandez is abducted while walking home from school in North Conway, New Hampshire. A man named Nathaniel Kibby offers her a ride in his truck but soon pulls a gun, destroys her phone, and tases her. He drives her to his property in a remote wooded area, blindfolds her, and confines her inside a locked, soundproof storage container. Kibby places a shock collar on Abby, monitors her with cameras, and warns her that if she tries to escape or reveal the truth, a militia he claims to control will harm her family.

Meanwhile, Abby’s mother, Zenya Hernandez, reports her missing and begins searching frantically, as local authorities launch an investigation. News of Abby’s disappearance spreads across New Hampshire, prompting widespread media attention and a community search effort. Some people speculate that Abby may have run away, but her mother continues to plead publicly for her safe return.

During captivity, Abby suffers repeated physical, sexual, and emotional abuse, but begins using her intelligence to survive. She feigns cooperation, follows Kibby’s orders, and slowly gains small amounts of trust. He allows her to read books, one of which reveals his name scribbled inside the cover. Kibby forces Abby to help him with tasks such as counterfeiting money. When she attempts to escape, Kibby punishes her by confining her more harshly, and forcing her to write misleading letters to her mother. Abby secretly embeds clues into these letters, hoping her family will recognize her distress.

As months pass, Kibby loosens restrictions slightly, even letting Abby watch news coverage about her own disappearance. Despite moments of despair, Abby maintains hope, holding onto faith that she will survive. After nearly nine months in captivity, police attention grows around Kibby due to his involvement in counterfeiting. Fearing exposure, Kibby drives Abby back near the area where she was first abducted and releases her on July 20, 2014. She walks home on her own, reuniting emotionally with her family after 284 days in captivity.

Kibby is arrested a week later and charged with numerous crimes, including kidnapping and sexual assault. He eventually pleads guilty and is sentenced to 45 to 90 years in prison. In the aftermath, Abby reflects on her ordeal, saying her survival was the result of resourcefulness, faith, and determination not to be reduced to a victim.

== Cast ==
- Lindsay Navarro as Abby Hernandez
- Ben Savage as Nathaniel "Nate" Kibby
- Erica Durance as Zenya Hernandez
- Jason Deline as Officer Daniels

== Filming ==
Navarro stated that playing Abby in the film was emotionally and physically difficult.
