= Erica Durance =

Canadian actress (born 1978)

- Erica Durance at GalaxyCon Richmond in 2020
- Born: June 21, 1978 (age 48); Calgary, Alberta, Canada
- Other name: Erica Parker
- Occupation: Actress
- Years active: 2001–present
- Spouses: Wesley Parker (m. 1996; div. 1999) David Palffy (m. 2005; div. 2024)
- Children: 2

Erica Durance (/dəˈræns/; born June 21, 1978) is a Canadian actress known for her roles as Lois Lane in the superhero television series Smallville (2004–2011) and as Dr. Alex Reid in the medical drama series Saving Hope (2012–2017). She has also appeared in films such as The Untold (2002), The Butterfly Effect 2 (2006), Final Verdict (2009) and Painkillers (2015).

== Early life ==
Durance was born in Calgary to parents Gail and Joel Durance and grew up on a turkey farm with her older brother and sister in Three Hills, Alberta, Canada. Durance moved to Vancouver in 1999 to pursue her interest in acting professionally and study at the Yaletown Actors Lab.

== Career ==
Durance began her career with background work. She appeared in commercials for Kokanee Beer. She has guest-starred in television series, including Andromeda, Stargate SG-1, Charlie's Angels, Harry's Law and Private Eyes.

In 2004, Durance was cast in her breakout role as Lois Lane on the television series Smallville. Durance was acting part-time and working as an agent for background actors and booking photo doubles for TV series and had considered quitting acting. "I was at a point in my life where I was a bit frustrated with the business," Durance said. "[my manager] had to talk me into going out for it." Producer Kelly Souders said they knew Durance was Lois for the series after seeing her casting tape, "there were a lot of wonderful actresses who came in for the role but I remember the entire writing staff watching her tape and just saying, that's her. She had everything. She had attitude but she was loveable and brought all of it in her audition tape." Durance played a sassy, teenage Lois in season four in a recurring role. She was promoted to series regular in season five and became part of the Smallville cast. She played the character for seven seasons. "Everyone has their specific idea of who Lois Lane is for them, and you have your overall blueprint, but then you have to try to make it your own. That's the only way to try to stay truthful to what you're doing," Durance on playing Lois Lane.

In 2012, Durance began starring in the lead role in the CTV medical drama television series Saving Hope, as Chief Surgical Dr. Alex Reid. She was also a producer on the series and directed the season four episode "Torn and Frayed". In season three, Durance's real-life pregnancy was worked into her character Alex Reid and the series. Saving Hope ended its run in 2017.

Durance appeared in the television series Supergirl in a recurring role as Kara's Kryptonian mother, Alura Zor-El. In 2019, Durance and her Smallville co-star Tom Welling reprised their roles as Lois and Clark in the Batwoman episode of the Arrowverse crossover event "Crisis on Infinite Earths".

Durance has appeared in several Lifetime and Hallmark films, including I Me Wed (2007), Wedding Planner Mystery (2014), Color My World with Love (2022) and A Scottish Love Scheme (2024).

== Personal life ==
Durance was previously married to Wesley Parker. In 2001, she began dating Canadian actor David Palffy. They married in 2005 and divorced in 2024. Durance and Palffy have two sons. She also has a stepson from her husband's previous relationship.

Durance is a supporter of World Vision Canada. In August 2006, she co-hosted the Superman/Batman #26 art auction with Jeph Loeb at the Wizard World Chicago convention. The auction raised $70,000. The event honored Loeb's son, Sam Loeb, who died at age 17 after a long battle with bone cancer, and all of its proceeds went to the Sam Loeb College Scholarship Fund.

== Accolades ==
Durance was ranked No. 38 on FHM magazine's "100 Sexiest Women in the World" in 2006 and #20 in 2007, #15 in 2008, and #14 in 2009. She has also appeared on the cover of FHM and Maxim magazine. In 2009, Durance was on Entertainment Weekly's Sci-fi Hotties Women. BuddyTV ranked her #26 on its TV's 100 Sexiest Women of 2009, and #16 on its 2010 list. In 2012, BuddyTV ranked Durance #9 on their list of Summer 2012's Sexiest Stars. Hello! magazine listed her as one of Canada's 50 Most Beautiful People in 2012.

== Filmography ==
=== Film ===
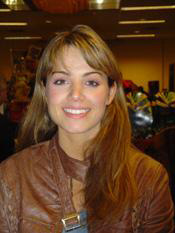
Durance at Adventure Con, 2006

Year	Title	Role	Notes	Ref
2002	The Untold	Tara Knowles		
2003	House of the Dead	Johanna	Credited as Erica Parker	
2004	The Bridge	Amy	Short film	
2006	The Butterfly Effect 2	Julie Miller		
2010	Sophie and Sheba	Natalia		
2012	Tim and Eric's Billion Dollar Movie	Paris Waitress		
2015	Painkillers	Trudy		

=== Television ===
Year	Title	Role	Notes	Ref
2001	The Lone Gunmen	Dancer	Episode: "Maximum Buyers"	
2003	Devil Winds	Kara Jensen	Television film, credited as Erica Parker	
2003	111 Gramercy Park	Maddy O'Donnell	Television film	
2004	The Chris Isaak Show	Ashley	Episode: "Let the Games Begin", credit as Erica Parker	
2004	Tru Calling	Angela Todd	Episode: "Drop Dead Gorgeous"	
2004	Andromeda	Amira	Episode: "Time Out of Mind"	
2004	Stargate SG-1	Krista James	Episode: "Affinity"	
2004	The Collector	Rachel Slate	Episode: "Another Collector"	
2004–2011	Smallville	Lois Lane	Recurring role (season 4); Main role (seasons 5–10)	
2006	Island Heat: Stranded	Carina	Television film	
2007	I Me Wed	Isabelle Darden	Television film	
2009	The Building	Jules Wilde	Television film	
2009	Final Verdict	Megan Washington	Television film	
2009	Beyond Sherwood Forest	Maid Marian	Television film	
2011	Charlie's Angels	Samantha Masters	Episode: "Angels in Chains"	
2012	Harry's Law	Annie Bilson	Episode: "Gorilla My Dreams"	
2012	6 passi nel giallo	Angela/Christine	Episode: "Gemelle"	
2012–2017	Saving Hope	Dr. Alex Reid	Main role	
2014	Wedding Planner Mystery	Carnegie Kincaid	Television film	
2017–2019	Supergirl	Alura Zor-El	Recurring role; 12 episodes	
2019	Batwoman	Lois Lane	Episode: "Crisis on Infinite Earths Part 2"	
2019	The Christmas Chalet	Grace	Television film	
2019	Christmas Stars	Layla	Television film	
2020	Private Eyes	Lauren Campbell	Episode: "Family Plot"	
2021	The Enchanted Christmas Cake	Gwen	Television film	
2021	Open by Christmas	Simone	Television film	
2022	North to Home	Hannan	Television film	
2022	Girl in the Shed: The Kidnapping of Abby Hernandez	Zenya	Television film	
2022	Color My World with Love	Emma	Television film	
2022	We Need a Little Christmas	Julie	Television film	
2023	Unexpected Grace	Noelle	Television film	
2023	Ms. Christmas Comes to Town	Amanda/Ms. Holiday	Television film	
2024	A Scottish Love Scheme	Lily	Television film	
2024	Murder in a Small Town	Emma O'Brea	Episode: "Prized Possessions"	
2024	Happy Holidays from Cherry Lane	Penny	Television film	
2024	Private Princess Christmas	Queen of Wingravia	Television film	
2025	Girl Taken	Anita	Television film	
2026	Tracker	Laura	Episode: "Breakaway"	
2026	Wild Cards	Celeste	Episode: "Yurt So Vain"	
2026	Law & Order Toronto: Criminal Intent	Claire Matthews	Episode: "XOXO"	

== Awards and nominations ==
Year	Award	Category	Work	Result	Ref
2004	Saturn Award	Best Supporting Actress on Television	Smallville	Nominated	
2005	Saturn Award	Best Supporting Actress on Television	Smallville	Nominated	
2008	Gemini Awards	Best Performance by an Actress in a Leading Role in a Dramatic Program or Mini-Series	I Me Wed	Nominated	
2010	Saturn Award	Best Actress on Television	Smallville	Nominated	
2011	Teen Choice Award	Choice TV Actress – Fantasy/Sci-Fi	Smallville	Nominated	
2012	Canadian Screen Awards	Best Actress in a Dramatic Role	Saving Hope	Nominated	
2016	Canadian Screen Awards	Best Actress in a Dramatic Role	Saving Hope	Nominated	
