= Laura Friedman =

American politician (born 1966)

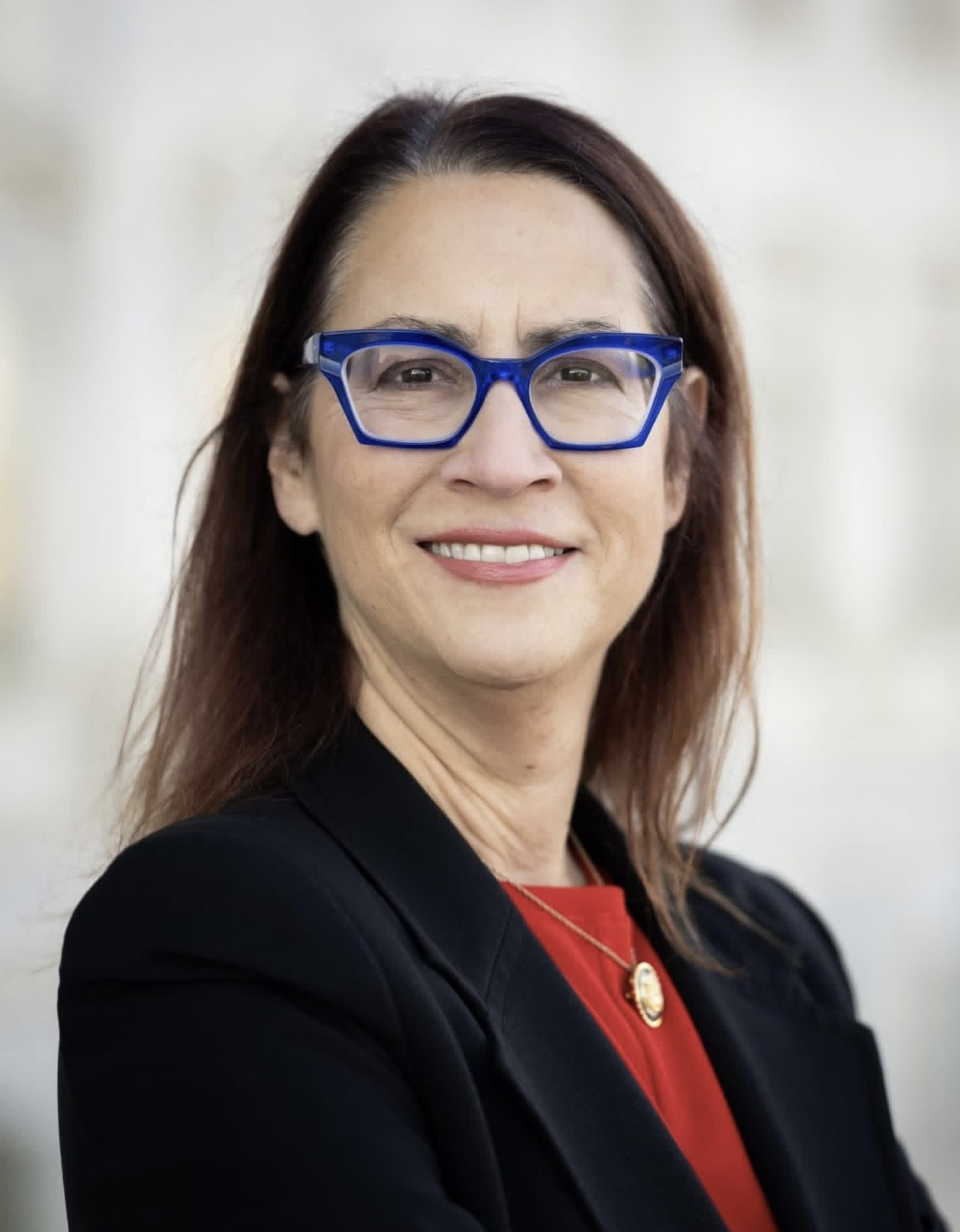
- Official portrait, 2026

Member of the U.S. House of Representatives from California's 30th district
- Incumbent
- Assumed office January 3, 2025
- Preceded by: Adam Schiff

Member of the California Assembly
- In office December 5, 2016 – November 30, 2024
- Preceded by: Mike Gatto
- Succeeded by: Nick Schultz
- Constituency: 43rd district (2016–2022); 44th district (2022–2024)

Mayor of Glendale
- In office April 2011 – April 2012
- Preceded by: Ara Najarian
- Succeeded by: Frank Quintero

Personal details
- Born: December 3, 1966 (age 59) New York City, New York, U.S.
- Party: Democratic
- Spouse: Guillaume Lemoine
- Children: 1
- Education: University of Rochester (BA)
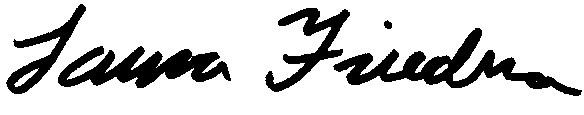
- Signature
- Website: House website Campaign website

Laura Syril Friedman (born December 3, 1966) is an American politician and former film producer who is the member for California's 30th congressional district in the House of Representatives. A member of the Democratic Party, she previously represented California's 44th State Assembly district from 2016 to 2024.

Prior to her election to the Assembly in 2016, Friedman was a member of the Glendale City Council from 2009 to 2016, where she served as mayor of Glendale from 2011 until 2012. She authored a bill to eliminate minimum parking requirements for housing near mass transit stations in California, which was signed into law in 2022.

== Early life and career ==
Friedman comes from a Jewish family in New York. She earned a Bachelor of Arts degree from the University of Rochester in New York. In 1992, Friedman moved to Hollywood, eventually relocating to Glendale in 2000 where she has resided ever since.

Between 1994 and 1997, Friedman was the vice president of development at Rysher Entertainment, where she oversaw the production of approximately ten feature films annually as well as extensive television programming.

In 1995, Friedman was the co-producer of the Warner Brothers release It Takes Two. In 1996, she was associate producer of House Arrest; executive producer of Foxfire; executive producer of the family film Zeus and Roxanne; and associate producer of the independent film Aberration, which was released by LIVE Entertainment. Between 1998 and 1999, Friedman was the vice president of development at Cort/Madden Company. Since 2000, Friedman has owned and managed PlanetGlass.net, a web-based art glass dealership.

== Political career ==
In April 2011, Friedman became the mayor of Glendale, California.

=== California State Assembly ===
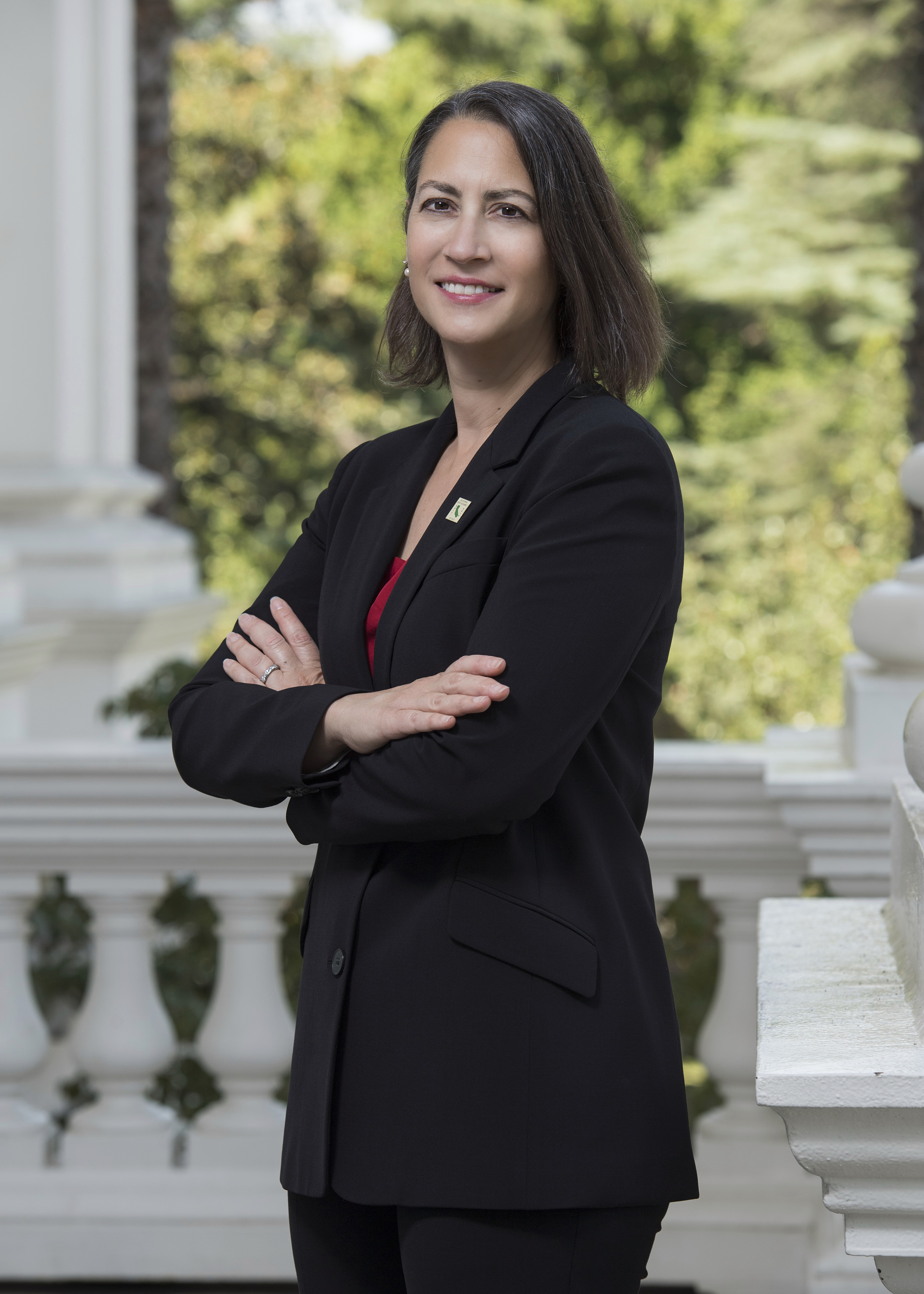
Official portrait in the California State Assembly, 2018

In 2019, Friedman authored legislation supported by animal rights organizations and activists to prohibit the sale of new fur products in California. The bill was signed by Governor Gavin Newsom in October 2019, making California the first state to ban the sale of fur. In 2024, Friedman co-authored legislation with Assemblymember Steve Bennett to prohibit the commercial farming of octopuses in California. The legislation was enacted in September 2024, making California the second state to prohibit octopus farming after the state of Washington banned the practice earlier that year.

On September 7, 2021, she delayed the release of $4 billion of voter approved bonds for the California High-Speed Rail, stating that the California High-Speed Rail Authority has "not provided us any real details about what the money would go towards this year". The CHSRA Chief Financial Officer, Brian Annis, countered by stating that the CHSRA already presented to the legislature the expenditure plan in February 2021 and that this delayed release by Friedman could cause budget delays to snowball.

Friedman was a member of the California Legislative Progressive Caucus.

=== Elections ===
==== 2024 ====
In January 2023, Friedman launched her candidacy in the 2024 election in California's 30th congressional district. The incumbent representative, Adam Schiff, vacated the seat in his successful bid in the 2024 United States Senate election in California. Friedman defeated physician Alex Balekian, receiving 68.4% of the vote.

=== Committee assignments ===
- Committee on Science, Space, and Technology
  - Subcommittee on Energy
- Committee on Transportation and Infrastructure
  - Subcommittee on Economic Development, Public Buildings and Emergency Management (Vice Ranking Member)
  - Subcommittee on Highways and Transit
  - Subcommittee on Railroads, Pipelines, and Hazardous Materials
  - Subcommittee on Water Resources and Environment

=== Caucus membership ===
- Congressional Progressive Caucus
- California Legislative Progressive Caucus
- Congressional Freethought Caucus

== Electoral history ==
California Assembly election, 2016: District 43
Primary election
Party	Candidate	Votes	%
Democratic	Laura Friedman	33,276	31.89
Democratic	Ardy Kassakhian	25,357	24.30
Republican	Mark MacCarley	16,551	15.86
Democratic	Andrew Blumenfield	13,309	12.75
Republican	Alexandra Bustamante	6,524	6.25
Democratic	Dennis Bullock	4,294	4.11
Democratic	Rajiv Dalal	3,173	3.04
American Independent	Aaron Cervantes	1,873	1.79
Total votes		104,357	100
General election
Democratic	Laura Friedman	106,186	64.45
Democratic	Ardy Kassakhian	58,561	35.55
Total votes		164,747	100
Democratic hold			

California Assembly election, 2018: District 43
Party	Candidate	Votes	%
Democratic	Laura Friedman (incumbent; uncontested)	125,568	100
Total votes		125,568	100
Democratic hold			

California Assembly election, 2020: District 43
Primary election
Party	Candidate	Votes	%
Democratic	Laura Friedman (incumbent)	88,541	75.64
Republican	Mike Graves	24,258	20.72
No party preference	Robert Sexton	4,264	3.64
Total votes		117,063	100
General election
Democratic	Laura Friedman (incumbent)	149,214	69.57
Republican	Mike Graves	65,270	30.43
Total votes		214,484	100
Democratic hold			

California Assembly election, 2022: District 44
Party	Candidate	Votes	%
Democratic	Laura Friedman (incumbent)	113,380	71.35
Republican	Barry Curtis Jacobsen	45,519	28.65
Total votes		158,899	100
Democratic hold			

US House election, 2024: California District 30
Primary election
Party	Candidate	Votes	%
Democratic	Laura Friedman	46,329	30.08
Republican	Alex Balekian	26,826	17.42
Democratic	Anthony Portantino	20,459	13.28
Democratic	Mike Feuer	18,878	12.26
Democratic	Maebe A. Girl	15,791	10.25
Republican	Emilio Martinez	6,775	4.40
Democratic	Ben Savage	6,147	3.99
Democratic	Nick Melvoin	4,134	2.68
Democratic	Jirair Ratevosian	2,889	1.88
Democratic	Sepi Shyne	2,126	1.38
Democratic	Courtney Najera	1,167	0.76
No party preference	Joshua Bocanegra	780	0.51
Democratic	Steve Dunwoody	727	0.47
Democratic	Francisco Arreaga	532	0.35
Democratic	Sal Genovese	442	0.29
Total votes		154,002	100
General election
Democratic	Laura Friedman	213,100	68.38
Republican	Alex Balekian	98,559	31.62
Total votes		311,659	100
Democratic hold			

US House election, 2026: California District 30
Primary election
Party	Candidate	Votes	%
Democratic	Laura Friedman (incumbent)	102,384	52.68
Republican	Scott Alan Meyers	32,216	16.58
Democratic	Cameron Tennyson	26,756	13.77
No party preference	John Armenian	10,341	5.32
Republican	Dennis Feitosa	9,084	4.67
Democratic	Joel Lava	8,210	4.22
Democratic	Pini Herman	5,360	2.76
Total votes		194,351	100

== Personal life ==
Friedman is married to Guillaume Lemoine, a professional landscape designer. The couple has a daughter, Rachel, born in 2013.

== See also ==
- List of Jewish members of the United States Congress

U.S. House of Representatives
Preceded by Adam Schiff	Member of the U.S. House of Representatives from California's 30th congressional district 2025–present	Incumbent
U.S. order of precedence (ceremonial)
Preceded by Shomari Figures	United States representatives by seniority 380th	Succeeded by Brandon Gill
