= Sasha Renée Pérez =

American politician (born 1992)

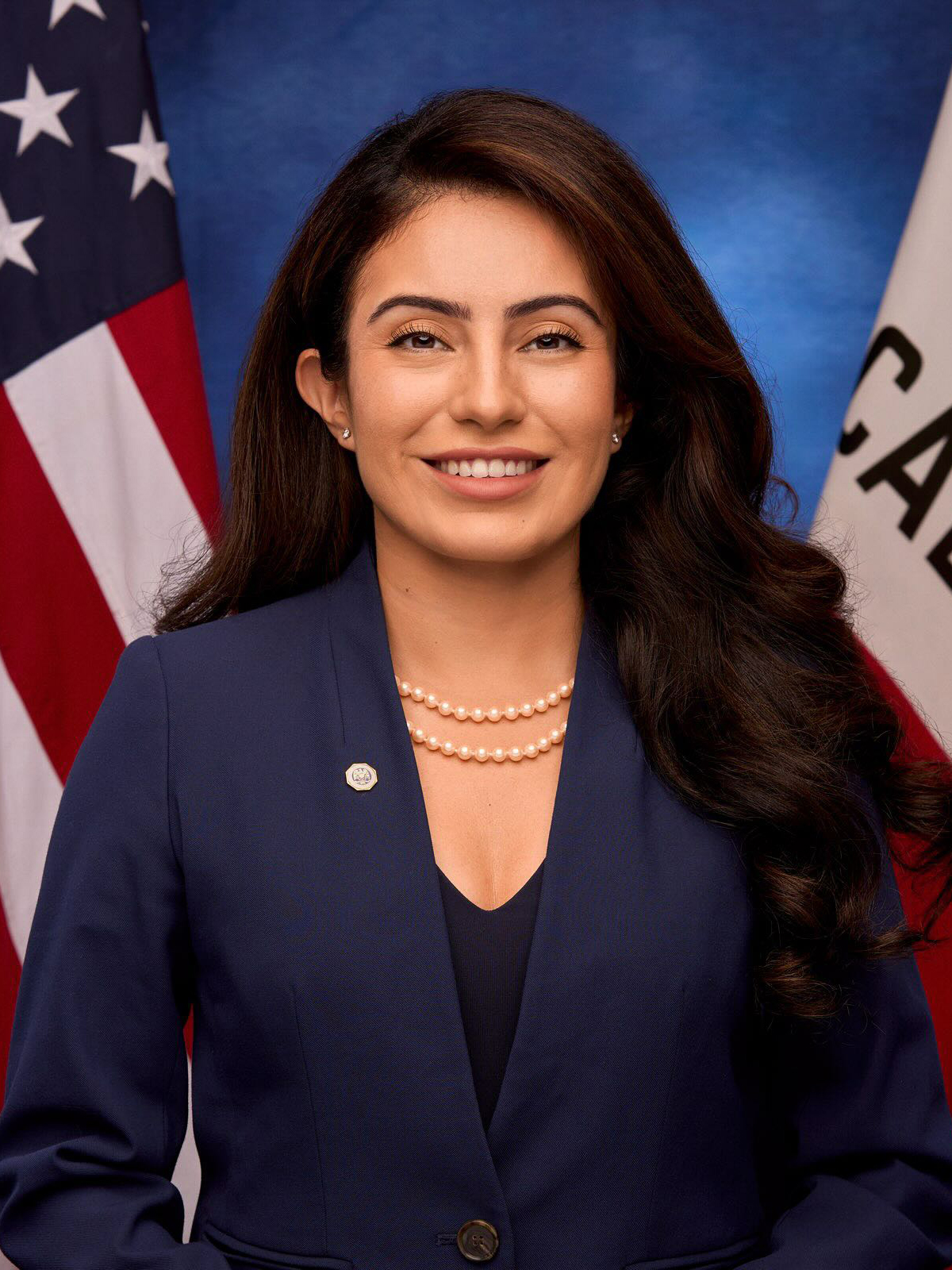
- Official portrait, 2024

Member of the California Senate from the 25th district
- Incumbent
- Assumed office December 2, 2024
- Preceded by: Anthony Portantino

Mayor of Alhambra
- In office June 24, 2024 – December 1, 2024
- Preceded by: Ross Maza
- Succeeded by: Noya Wang

Member of the Alhambra City Council from District 4
- In office December 31, 2020 – December 1, 2024
- Preceded by: David Mejia
- Succeeded by: Noya Wang

Personal details
- Born: September 16, 1992 (age 34) Alhambra, California, U.S.
- Party: Democratic
- Education: California State University, Los Angeles (BA, BS)

Sasha Renée Pérez (born September 16, 1992) is an American politician who is a member of the California State Senate for the 25th district. A Democrat, she is the youngest State Senator in California. Pérez previously served as mayor and city councilor of Alhambra.

== Early life and education ==
Pérez was born in Alhambra and was raised there and in Glendora. Her father is a union electrician and her mother is a social worker.

Pérez graduated from Mark Keppel High School and is a first-generation college graduate, holding a Bachelor of Arts in Political Science and a Bachelor of Science in Economics from California State University, Los Angeles.

== Career ==
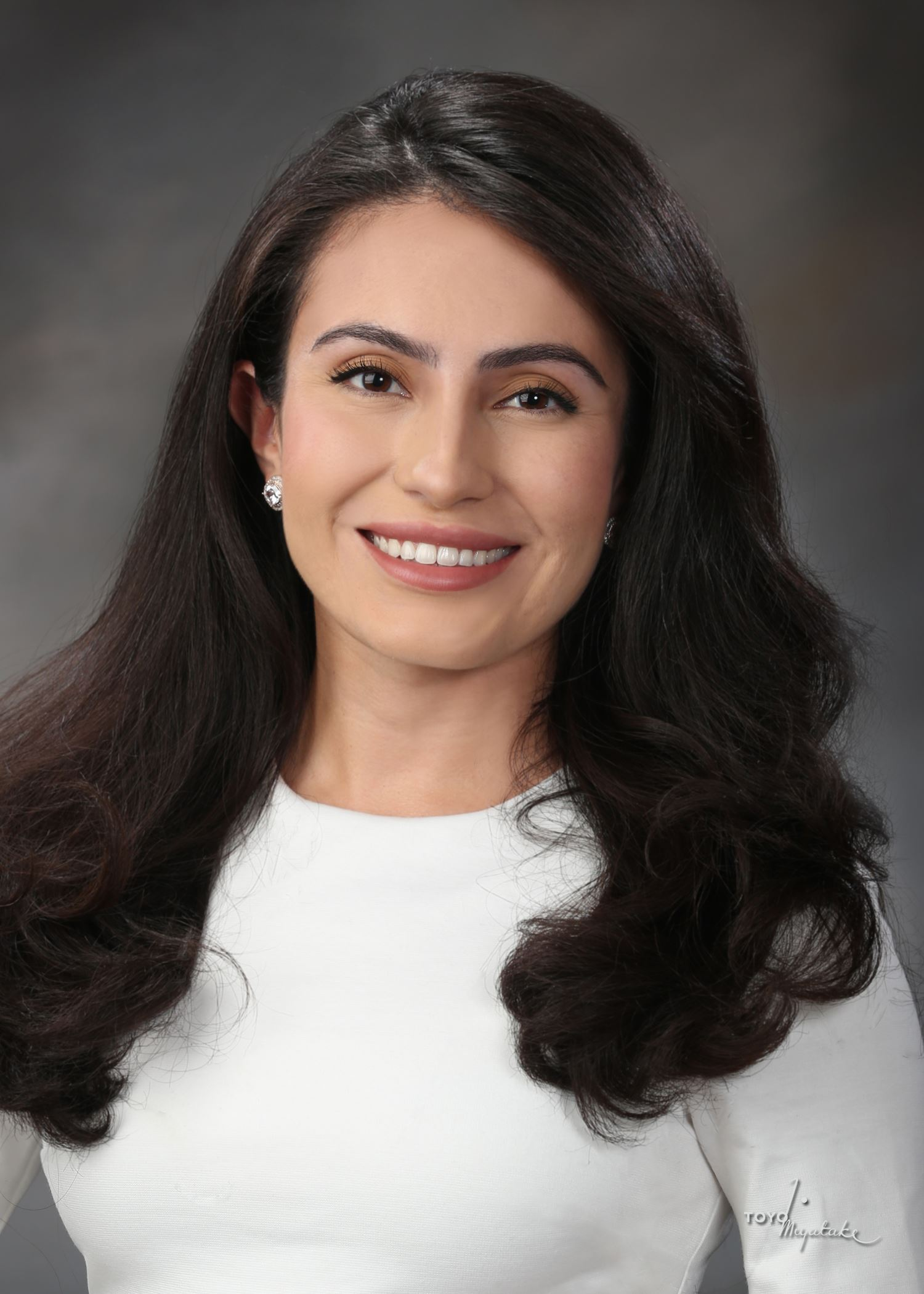
Portrait as a city councilor of Alhambra, 2020

Pérez began her career running an after-school program at Roosevelt High School for the Pat Brown Institute for Public Affairs. In 2018, she left to work at the Campaign for College Opportunity a non-profit focused on improving college access, success and affordability for California students. Pérez led efforts to expand financial aid to 150,000 more students through the passage of the Cal Grant Equity Framework and created reports on the needs of diverse student populations in colleges and universities.

=== Alhambra City Council ===
In 2020, Pérez challenged incumbent Alhambra Mayor David Mejia, unseating him after winning 58.49% of the vote. Upon being elected to the Alhambra City Council in 2020, Pérez was selected to serve as Mayor. This made her the first openly LGBTQ+ person and renter on the council and the youngest woman to serve as Mayor in San Gabriel Valley history.

Pérez was honored as Outstanding Elected Official of the Year in 2021 for her work to reduce plastic waste, create dedicated bike lanes and provide hazard pay to grocery store and pharmacy store workers during the COVID-19 pandemic.

=== California State Senate ===
In 2023, Pérez announced her candidacy for the California State Senate seat being vacated by Anthony Portantino, who was terming out and running for the U.S. House of Representatives. In her announcement, she expressed her commitment to "ensuring a future where everyone can achieve the California dream."

During the primary election, Pérez's main opponent Monterey Park City Councilwoman Yvonne Yiu, self-funded her campaign with over $2.9 million, making her California's top campaign donor at the time. Despite being outspent 3-to-1, Pérez defeated Yiu by more than 15 points in an upset. Pérez advanced alongside Republican Crescenta Valley Town Council member Elizabeth Ahlers to the general election, where Pérez ultimately defeated Ahlers to secure the seat.

Pérez is the youngest member of the California State Senate and the 2nd youngest woman to ever serve in the California State Senate.

== Personal life ==
Pérez is openly bisexual.

== Electoral history ==
=== 2020 ===
2020 Alhambra City Council 4th district election
Party	Candidate	Votes	%
Nonpartisan	Sasha Renée Pérez	16,934	58.5
Nonpartisan	David Mejia (incumbent)	9,541	33.0
Nonpartisan	Karsen Luthi	2,479	8.6
Total votes		28,954	100.0

=== 2024 ===
2024 California State Senate 25th district election
Primary election
Party	Candidate	Votes	%
Republican	Elizabeth Wong Ahlers	73,002	35.7
Democratic	Sasha Renée Pérez	67,266	32.9
Democratic	Yvonne Yiu	35,693	17.5
Democratic	Sandra Armenta	19,486	9.5
Democratic	Teddy Choi	8,881	4.3
Total votes		204,328	100.0
General election
Democratic	Sasha Renée Pérez	243,371	59.6
Republican	Elizabeth Wong Ahlers	164,757	40.4
Total votes		408,128	100.0
Democratic hold			
