= Car Babes =

- Theatrical poster
- Directed by: Nick Fumia; Chris Wolf
- Written by: Blake Dirickson; Nick Fumia; Chris Wolf
- Produced by: Ben Rekhi; Elizabeth Destro
- Starring: Ben Savage; Jon Gries; Blake Clark; Donnell Rawlings
- Cinematography: Oden Roberts
- Edited by: Cary Gries
- Music by: Dino Campanella
- Release dates: October 22, 2006 (Hollywood Film Festival); December 26, 2006 (United States)
- Running time: 87 minutes
- Country: United States
- Language: English

Car Babes is a 2006 independent comedy film starring Ben Savage and directed by Nick Fumia and Chris Wolf.

The title of producer Ben Rekhi's Car Babes comes from the term car salesmen use for each other. He realizes that some might suspect otherwise, but promises "it's in no way a bikini car wash movie".

The film is a coming-of-age comedy starring Savage as a recent college grad living at home who reluctantly goes to work at his dad's car dealership. "The original idea emerged from stories our co-writer Blake Dirickson entertained us with about working for his father on his car lot", say co-directors Nick Fumia and Chris Wolf, who jack up their film's tension with the threat of a hostile takeover and the requisite romantic interest. The soundtrack ranges from hip-hop to country.

Car Babes had its premiere on December 26, 2006.

== Overview ==
Directed and produced by five Bay Area filmmakers, Car Babes is the first feature-length film written, directed, and produced by all five filmmakers, who channeled their love for the art of making films to produce this slapstick comedy.

The idea for the film was conceptualized by Blake Dirickson, 27, who is one of the writers of the film. He said he gained the inspiration for the film from a used car lot in Santa Clara, where he worked for 18 months. He would often share stories with his friends about the car babes he worked with. He pitched the concept to first-time filmmakers Chris Wolf, 27, Nick Fumia, 27, Ben Rehki, 28, and Liz Destro, 27, and they loved the idea.

"The biggest challenge we faced with this project was convincing friends and strangers to invest in a group of filmmakers who didn't have much under their belts in the realm of filmmaking," Wolf said.

"It was the most emotionally and physically draining thing I've ever done and I loved every minute of it," said Fumia.

The 35mm Car Babes, was shot at Moore Pontiac & Buick in Los Gatos, California, for 26 days late Summer, 2005, with feature film cinematographer Oden Roberts. Co-starring in Car Babes are Jon Gries, Blake Clark, Donnell Rawlings, Carolina Garcia and David Shackelford.

For Ben Savage the attraction was the dynamic between the father and son and the struggle for the son to grow from a boy into a man. "It focused on something my friends and I are going through," the recent Stanford graduate explains. "Like that two- or three-year period right out of college where everything's a possibility, everything's terrifying. You don't really have any sense of stability. It's the first time you're out on your own in life and I think that's such an interesting time."

Savage is in almost every scene of the film and he appreciates the level of collaboration involved. "Working with these guys, it really makes you feel like it's a group project. They're all young (and) they are very open and receptive to everyone's ideas. It's a really great set to be around."

Having to put the film together on a "spit and glue" budget (an industry term for low budget), covering 126 days of script in 26 days, caused the cast to improvise and adjust along the way, according to Wolf. He said it is under these circumstances, however, that the most creative things happen.

Much like the car babes they portray in the film, Wolf said being a filmmaker also starts and ends with the ability to sell yourself. He said Car Babes is a stepping-stone to something bigger for each of the filmmakers.

"Watching a little dream turn into something that is essentially immortal and the experience of creating something that starts on piece of paper and ends up on the big screen is really rewarding," Wolf said.

== Plot ==
Ford Davis, a 24-year-old recent college graduate with no direction in his life, is forced to live with his parents and work for his dad, Big Len, at his car dealership to pay off a loaner car he damaged. On the lot, Ford quickly learns that the game of car sales is not easy. His only saving grace becomes his co-workers, the heartwarming and irreverent Car Babes, who teach him that selling cars is about selling yourself. After an unforgettable test drive with a self-assured hairdresser, Ford begins to gain confidence not only selling cars, but with his new sexy girlfriend.

But back on the lot, mobile home tycoon Ron Hamper, owner of the neighboring Hamper's Campers, has his evil eye on Big Len's property. After an uncalled-for visit, Hamper threatens to shut Big Len down and turn Davis Automotive into a parking lot for his used campers.

With the days at Davis Automotive numbered, Big Len and the Car Babes have all but given up, but Ford comes up with an idea to save the dealership. Using the wisdom he has gained from his father and the rest of the team, Ford concocts one final plan: a blowout sale to sell 300 cars in a month.

== Cast ==
Car Babes of the title are (l to r) John Campo, Marshall Manesh, Ben Savage, Donnell Rawlings and David Shackelford.

- Ben Savage as Ford Davis
- Jon Gries as Gary
- Blake Clark as "Big Len" Davis
- Donnell Rawlings as Julius Jefferson
- Kevin Blackton as Ron Hamper
- Stephanie Keeney as Judy Gary
- Arj Barker as Jimmy
- David Shackelford as Pat Skis
- John Campo as Dicky Deluna
- Marshall Manesh as Babu Gulab
- Carolina Garcia as Alicia Santos
- Amy Resnick as Linda Davis
- Klaudia Izabella Warren as Car Babe

== Home media ==
Car Babes was released in Region 1 DVD on June 10, 2008, by Vivendi Visual Entertainment.
