= California's 30th congressional district =

U.S. House district for California

Coordinates: 34°12′07″N 118°32′49″W

- Interactive map of district boundaries
- Representative: Laura Friedman; D–Glendale
- Population (2025): 746,589
- Median household income: $87,441
- Ethnicity: 55.6% White; 23.4% Hispanic; 12.6% Asian; 4.2% Two or more races; 3.3% Black; 0.9% other
- Cook PVI: D+22

California's 30th congressional district is a congressional district in the U.S. state of California. The district was represented by Democrat Adam Schiff until December 2024 when he was elected to the U.S. Senate. Democrat Laura Friedman was elected to succeed him, and took office in January 2025.

The 30th district takes in all of Burbank and Glendale, the Linda Vista neighborhood of Pasadena, and the Los Angeles communities of Tujunga, Hollywood, West Hollywood, Edendale, Park La Brea, Hancock Park, Los Feliz, and westside Echo Park.

== Recent election results from statewide races ==
=== 2023–2027 boundaries ===
Year	Office	Results
2008	President	Obama 74% - 26%
2010	Governor	Brown 67% - 29%
2010	Lt. Governor	Newsom 65% - 26%
2010	Secretary of State	Bowen 66% - 26%
2010	Attorney General	Harris 57% - 36%
2010	Treasurer	Lockyer 68% - 25%
2010	Controller	Chiang 66% - 26%
2012	President	Obama 75% - 25%
2014	Governor	Brown 74% - 26%
2016	President	Clinton 74% - 21%
2018	Governor	Newsom 77% - 23%
2018	Attorney General	Becerra 79% - 21%
2020	President	Biden 72% - 26%
2022	Senate (Reg.)	Padilla 77% - 23%
2022	Governor	Newsom 75% - 25%
2022	Lt. Governor	Kounalakis 75% - 25%
2022	Secretary of State	Weber 76% - 24%
2022	Attorney General	Bonta 75% - 25%
2022	Treasurer	Ma 74% - 26%
2022	Controller	Cohen 69% - 31%
2024	President	Harris 69% - 28%
2024	Senate (Reg.)	Schiff 72% - 28%

== Composition ==
FIPS County Code	County	Seat	Population
37	Los Angeles	Los Angeles	9,663,345

Under 2020 redistricting, California's 30th congressional district is located within Los Angeles County, with two sections covering parts of the northern areas of the City of Los Angeles.

Los Angeles County is split between this district, the 27th district, the 28th district, the 29th district, the 32nd district, the 34th district, the 36th district, and the 37th district. The 30th and 27th are partitioned by Angeles National Forest, B P and L Rd, Mt Emma Rd, BPL Rd, Angeles Forest Highway, NF-3N17, Moody Canyon, NF-4N53, Soledad Canyon Rd, Indian Canyon Rd, and Santa Clarita Divide Rd.

The 30th and 28th are partitioned by Angeles National Forest, Big Tujunga Creek, Big Tujunga Canyon Rd, Silver Creek, Markridge Rd, Pennsylvania Ave, Northwoods Ln, Ramsdell Ave, Fairway Ave, La Crescenta Ave, Mayfield Ave, Rosemont Ave, Florencita Ave, Thompson Ct, Park Pl, Verdugo Blvd, La Tour Way, Descanso Gardens, Norham Pl, Wendover Rd, Linda Vista Ave, Oak Grove Dr, Yucca Ln, W Montana St, Vermont St, Forest Ave, Wyoming St, Lincoln Ave, Anderson Pl, Canada Pl, Highway 210, W Hammond St, Glen Ave, W Mountain St, Manzanita Ave, N Orange Grove Blvd, and Ventura Freeway.

The 30th and 29th are partitioned by Angeles National Forest, NF-4N35, Gold Creek Rd, Big Tujunga Canyon Rd, Little Tujunga Rd, Longford St, Clybourne Ave, Foothill Freeway, Kagel Canyon St, Osborne St, Terra Bella St, Glenoaks Blvd, Montague St, San Fernando Rd, Branford St, Tujunga Wash, Wentworth St, Sheldon St, Tuxford St, Sunland Blvd, Golden State Freeway, Cohasset St, Sherman Way, Vineland Ave, Southern Pacific Railroad, Ledge Ave, W Clark Ave, N Clybourn Ave, and the Los Angeles River.

The 30th and 32nd are partitioned by Lankershim Blvd, Fredonia Dr, Cahuenga Blvd W, Broadlawn Dr, Multiview Dr, Mulholland Dr, Laurel Canyon Blvd, W Sunset Blvd, Ozeta Ter, and Doheny Rd.

The 30th and 34th are partitioned by Crenshaw Blvd, Wilshire Blvd, S Van Ness Ave, S Wilton Pl, N Wilton Pl, Beverly Blvd, N Western Ave, Melrose Ave, Hollywood Freeway, Douglas St, Lilac Ter, N Boylston St, Academy Rd, Pasadena Freeway, Highway 5, Duvall St, Blake Ave, Fernleaf St, Crystal St, Blake Ave, Meadowvale Ave, Los Angeles, Benedict St, N Coolidge Ave, Glendale Freeway, Roswell St, Delay Dr, Fletcher Dr, Southern Pacific Railroad, S Glendale Ave, Vista Superba Dr, Verdugo Rd, Plumas St, Carr Park, Harvey Dr, and Eagle Rock Hilside Park.

The 30th, 36th, and 37th are partitioned by Phyllis Ave, N Doheny Dr, N Oakhurst Dr, Burton Way, N Robertson Blvd, 8733 Clifton Way-201 S Le Doux Rd, N San Vicente Blvd, La Cienga Park, W Olympic Blvd, San Vicente Blvd, S Cochran Ave, Edgewood Pl, S Cloverdale Ave, S La Brea Ave, and S Sycamore Ave.

=== Cities and CDPs with 10,000 or more people ===
- Los Angeles - 3,820,914
- Glendale - 196,543
- Pasadena - 138,699
- Burbank - 107,337
- West Hollywood - 35,757

== List of members representing the district ==
Member	Party	Years	Cong ress(es)	Electoral history	Counties
District created January 3, 1953
Bob Wilson (Chula Vista)	Republican	January 3, 1953 – January 3, 1963	83rd 84th 85th 86th 87th	Elected in 1952. Re-elected in 1954. Re-elected in 1956. Re-elected in 1958. Re-elected in 1960. Redistricted to the 36th district.	1953–1963; San Diego
Edward R. Roybal (Los Angeles)	Democratic	January 3, 1963 – January 3, 1975	88th 89th 90th 91st 92nd 93rd	Elected in 1962. Re-elected in 1964. Re-elected in 1966. Re-elected in 1968. Re-elected in 1970. Re-elected in 1972. Redistricted to the 25th district.	1963–1969; Los Angeles
Edward R. Roybal (Los Angeles)	Democratic	January 3, 1963 – January 3, 1975	88th 89th 90th 91st 92nd 93rd	Elected in 1962. Re-elected in 1964. Re-elected in 1966. Re-elected in 1968. Re-elected in 1970. Re-elected in 1972. Redistricted to the 25th district.	1969–1973; Los Angeles
Edward R. Roybal (Los Angeles)	Democratic	January 3, 1963 – January 3, 1975	88th 89th 90th 91st 92nd 93rd	Elected in 1962. Re-elected in 1964. Re-elected in 1966. Re-elected in 1968. Re-elected in 1970. Re-elected in 1972. Redistricted to the 25th district.	1973–1975; Los Angeles
George E. Danielson (Monterey Park)	Democratic	January 3, 1975 – March 9, 1982	94th 95th 96th 97th	Redistricted from the 29th district and re-elected in 1974. Re-elected in 1976. Re-elected in 1978. Re-elected in 1980. Resigned after being appointed as associate justice on California courts of appeal.	1975–1983; Los Angeles
Vacant		March 9, 1982 – July 13, 1982	97th	Special election held July 13, 1982	1975–1983; Los Angeles
Matthew G. Martínez (Montebello)	Democratic	July 13, 1982 – January 3, 1993	97th 98th 99th 100th 101st 102nd	Elected to finish Danielson's term. Re-elected in 1982. Re-elected in 1984. Re-elected in 1986. Re-elected in 1988. Re-elected in 1990. Redistricted to the 31st district.	1975–1983; Los Angeles
Matthew G. Martínez (Montebello)	Democratic	July 13, 1982 – January 3, 1993	97th 98th 99th 100th 101st 102nd	Elected to finish Danielson's term. Re-elected in 1982. Re-elected in 1984. Re-elected in 1986. Re-elected in 1988. Re-elected in 1990. Redistricted to the 31st district.	1983–1993; Los Angeles (San Gabriel Valley)
Xavier Becerra (Los Angeles)	Democratic	January 3, 1993 – January 3, 2003	103rd 104th 105th 106th 107th	Elected in 1992. Re-elected in 1994. Re-elected in 1996. Re-elected in 1998. Re-elected in 2000. Redistricted to the 31st district.	1993–2003; Central/East/Southeast Los Angeles
Henry Waxman (Los Angeles)	Democratic	January 3, 2003 – January 3, 2013	108th 109th 110th 111th 112th	Redistricted from the 29th district and re-elected in 2002. Re-elected in 2004. Re-elected in 2006. Re-elected in 2008. Re-elected in 2010. Redistricted to the 33rd district.	2003–2013 West Side Los Angeles
Brad Sherman (Los Angeles)	Democratic	January 3, 2013 – January 3, 2023	113th 114th 115th 116th 117th	Redistricted from the 27th district and re-elected in 2012. Re-elected in 2014. Re-elected in 2016. Re-elected in 2018. Re-elected in 2020. Redistricted to the 32nd district.	2013–2023 Western San Fernando Valley including Sherman Oaks
Adam Schiff (Burbank)	Democratic	January 3, 2023 – December 8, 2024	118th	Redistricted from the 28th district and re-elected in 2022. Resigned after being elected U.S. Senator.	2023–present: West Hollywood, Burbank, parts of Pasadena, Glendale, the Verdugo Hills communities of Sunland and Tujunga, as well as parts of central Los Angeles including Hollywood, the Hollywood Hills, Echo Park, Silver Lake, and Los Feliz
Vacant		December 8, 2024 – January 3, 2025	118th		2023–present: West Hollywood, Burbank, parts of Pasadena, Glendale, the Verdugo Hills communities of Sunland and Tujunga, as well as parts of central Los Angeles including Hollywood, the Hollywood Hills, Echo Park, Silver Lake, and Los Feliz
Laura Friedman (Glendale)	Democratic	January 3, 2025 – present	119th	Elected in 2024. Re-elected in 2026.	2023–present: West Hollywood, Burbank, parts of Pasadena, Glendale, the Verdugo Hills communities of Sunland and Tujunga, as well as parts of central Los Angeles including Hollywood, the Hollywood Hills, Echo Park, Silver Lake, and Los Feliz

== Election results ==
=== 1952 ===
1952 United States House of Representatives elections in California
Party	Candidate	Votes	%
Republican	Bob Wilson	121,322	59.6
Democratic	De Graff Austin	82,311	40.4
Total votes		203,633	100.0
Republican win (new seat)			

=== 1954 ===
1954 United States House of Representatives elections in California
Party	Candidate	Votes	%
Republican	Bob Wilson (Incumbent)	94,623	60.4
Democratic	Ross T. McIntire	61,994	39.6
Total votes		156,617	100.0
Republican hold			

=== 1956 ===
1956 United States House of Representatives elections in California
Party	Candidate	Votes	%
Republican	Bob Wilson (Incumbent)	142,753	66.7
Democratic	George A. Cheney	71,112	33.3
Total votes		213,865	100.0
Republican hold			

=== 1958 ===
1958 United States House of Representatives elections in California
Party	Candidate	Votes	%
Republican	Bob Wilson (Incumbent)	112,290	52.7
Democratic	Lionel Van Deerlin	90,641	47.3
Total votes		202,931	100.0
Republican hold			

=== 1960 ===
1960 United States House of Representatives elections in California
Party	Candidate	Votes	%
Republican	Bob Wilson (Incumbent)	158,679	59.3
Democratic	Walter Wencke	108,882	40.7
Total votes		267,561	100.0
Republican hold			

=== 1962 ===
1962 United States House of Representatives elections in California
Party	Candidate	Votes	%
Democratic	Edward R. Roybal	69,008	56.5
Republican	Gordon L. McDonough (Incumbent)	53,104	43.5
Total votes		122,112	100.0
Democratic gain from Republican			

=== 1964 ===
1964 United States House of Representatives elections in California
Party	Candidate	Votes	%
Democratic	Edward R. Roybal (Incumbent)	90,329	66.3
Republican	Alfred J. Feder	45,912	33.7
Total votes		136,241	100.0
Democratic hold			

=== 1966 ===
1966 United States House of Representatives elections in California
Party	Candidate	Votes	%
Democratic	Edward R. Roybal (Incumbent)	72,173	66.4
Republican	Henri O'Bryant Jr.	36,506	33.6
Total votes		108,679	100.0
Democratic hold			

=== 1968 ===
1968 United States House of Representatives elections in California
Party	Candidate	Votes	%
Democratic	Edward R. Roybal (Incumbent)	75,381	67.5
Republican	Samuel F. Cavnar	36,312	32.5
Total votes		111,693	100.0
Democratic hold			

=== 1970 ===
1970 United States House of Representatives elections in California
Party	Candidate	Votes	%
Democratic	Edward R. Roybal (Incumbent)	63,903	68.3
Republican	Samuel F. Cavnar	28,038	29.9
American Independent	Boris Belousov	1,681	1.8
Total votes		93,622	100.0
Democratic hold			

=== 1972 ===
1972 United States House of Representatives elections in California
Party	Candidate	Votes	%
Democratic	Edward R. Roybal (Incumbent)	76,521	68.4
Republican	Bill Brophy	32,005	28.6
Peace and Freedom	Lewis McCammon	3,355	3.0
Total votes		111,881	100.0
Democratic hold			

=== 1974 ===
1974 United States House of Representatives elections in California
Party	Candidate	Votes	%
Democratic	George E. Danielson (Incumbent)	66,074	74.2
Republican	John J. Perez	22,928	25.8
Total votes		89,002	100.0
Democratic hold			

=== 1976 ===
1976 United States House of Representatives elections in California
Party	Candidate	Votes	%
Democratic	George E. Danielson (Incumbent)	82,767	74.4
Republican	Harry Couch	28,503	25.6
Total votes		111,270	100.0
Democratic hold			

=== 1978 ===
1978 United States House of Representatives elections in California
Party	Candidate	Votes	%
Democratic	George E. Danielson (Incumbent)	66,241	71.4
Republican	Henry Ares	26,511	28.6
Total votes		92,752	100.0
Democratic hold			

=== 1980 ===
1980 United States House of Representatives elections in California
Party	Candidate	Votes	%
Democratic	George E. Danielson (Incumbent)	74,119	72.1
Republican	J. Arthur "Art" Platten	24,136	23.5
Libertarian	Bruce M. Hobbs	4,480	4.4
Total votes		102,735	100.0
Democratic hold			

=== 1982 (Special) ===
1982 California's 30th congressional district special election
Party	Candidate	Votes	%
Democratic	Matthew G. Martínez	14,593	51.0
Republican	Ralph Roy Ramirez	14,043	49.0
Total votes		28,636	100.0
Democratic hold			

=== 1982 ===
1982 United States House of Representatives elections in California
Party	Candidate	Votes	%
Democratic	Matthew G. Martínez (Incumbent)	60,905	53.9
Republican	John H. Rousselot (Incumbent)	52,177	46.1
Total votes		113,082	100.0
Democratic hold			

=== 1984 ===
1984 United States House of Representatives elections in California
Party	Candidate	Votes	%
Democratic	Matthew G. Martínez (Incumbent)	64,378	51.8
Republican	Richard Gomez	53,900	43.4
American Independent	Houston A. Meyers	6,055	4.8
Total votes		124,333	100.0
Democratic hold			

=== 1986 ===
1986 United States House of Representatives elections in California
Party	Candidate	Votes	%
Democratic	Matthew G. Martínez (Incumbent)	59,369	62.5
Republican	John W. Almquist	33,705	35.5
Libertarian	Kim J. Goldsworthy	1,911	2.0
Total votes		94,985	100.0
Democratic hold			

=== 1988 ===
1988 United States House of Representatives elections in California
Party	Candidate	Votes	%
Democratic	Matthew G. Martínez (Incumbent)	72,253	59.9
Republican	Ralph Roy Ramirez	43,833	25.5
American Independent	Houston A. Myers	2,694	2.2
Libertarian	Kim J. Goldsworthy	1,864	1.5
Total votes		120,644	100.0
Democratic hold			

=== 1990 ===
1990 United States House of Representatives elections in California
Party	Candidate	Votes	%
Democratic	Matthew G. Martínez (Incumbent)	45,456	58.2
Republican	Reuben D. Franco	28,914	37.0
Libertarian	George Curtis Feger	3,713	4.8
Total votes		78,083	100.0
Democratic hold			

=== 1992 ===
1992 United States House of Representatives elections in California
Party	Candidate	Votes	%
Democratic	Xavier Becerra	48,800	58.5
Republican	Mark Robbins	20,034	25.8
Green	Blase Bonpane	6,315	7.6
Peace and Freedom	Elizabeth A. Nakano	6,173	7.4
Libertarian	Andrew "Drew" Consalvo	2,221	2.7
Total votes		83,543	100.0
Democratic hold			

=== 1994 ===
1994 United States House of Representatives elections in California
Party	Candidate	Votes	%
Democratic	Xavier Becerra (Incumbent)	43,943	66.2
Republican	David A. Ramirez	18,741	28.2
Libertarian	R. William Weilberg	3,741	5.6
Total votes		66,425	100.0
Democratic hold			

=== 1996 ===
1996 United States House of Representatives elections in California
Party	Candidate	Votes	%
Democratic	Xavier Becerra (Incumbent)	58,283	72.4
Republican	Patricia Parker	15,078	18.7
Libertarian	Pam Probst	2,759	3.4
Peace and Freedom	Shirley Mandel	2,499	3.1
Natural Law	Rosemary Watson-Frith	1,971	2.4
Total votes		70,590	100.0
Democratic hold			

=== 1998 ===
1998 United States House of Representatives elections in California
Party	Candidate	Votes	%
Democratic	Xavier Becerra (Incumbent)	58,230	81.2
Republican	Patricia Parker	13,441	18.8
Total votes		71,671	100.0
Democratic hold			

=== 2000 ===
2000 United States House of Representatives elections in California
Party	Candidate	Votes	%
Democratic	Xavier Becerra (Incumbent)	83,223	83.3
Republican	Tony Goss	11,788	11.8
Libertarian	Jason E. Heath	2,858	2.9
Natural Law	Gary D. Hearne	2,051	2.0
Total votes		99,920	100.0
Democratic hold			

=== 2002 ===
2002 United States House of Representatives elections in California
Party	Candidate	Votes	%
Democratic	Henry Waxman (Incumbent)	130,604	70.4
Republican	Tony D. Goss	54,989	29.6
Total votes		185,593	100.0
Democratic hold			

=== 2004 ===
2004 United States House of Representatives elections in California
Party	Candidate	Votes	%
Democratic	Henry Waxman (Incumbent)	216,682	71.3
Republican	Victor Elizalde	87,465	28.7
Total votes		313,147	100.0
Democratic hold			

=== 2006 ===
2006 United States House of Representatives elections in California
Party	Candidate	Votes	%
Democratic	Henry Waxman (Incumbent)	151,284	71.5
Republican	David Nelson Jones	55,904	26.4
Peace and Freedom	Adele M. Cannon	4,546	2.1
Total votes		211,734	100.0
Democratic hold			

=== 2008 ===
2008 United States House of Representatives elections in California
Party	Candidate	Votes	%
Democratic	Henry Waxman (Incumbent)	242,792	100.0
Democratic hold			

=== 2010 ===
2010 United States House of Representatives elections in California
Party	Candidate	Votes	%
Democratic	Henry Waxman (Incumbent)	153,663	64.7
Republican	Charles E. Wilkerson	75,948	31.9
Libertarian	Erich D. Miller	5,021	2.1
Peace and Freedom	Richard R. Castaldo	3,115	1.3
Total votes		237,747	100.0
Democratic hold			

=== 2012 ===
2012 United States House of Representatives elections in California
Party	Candidate	Votes	%
Democratic	Brad Sherman (Incumbent)	149,456	60.3
Democratic	Howard Berman (incumbent)	98,395	39.7
Total votes		247,851	100.0
Democratic hold			

=== 2014 ===
2014 United States House of Representatives elections in California
Party	Candidate	Votes	%
Democratic	Brad Sherman (Incumbent)	86,568	65.6
Republican	Mark S. Reed	45,315	34.4
Total votes		131,883	100%
Democratic hold			

=== 2016 ===
2016 United States House of Representatives elections in California
Party	Candidate	Votes	%
Democratic	Brad Sherman (Incumbent)	205,279	72.6
Republican	Mark S. Reed	77,325	27.4
Total votes		282,604	100.0
Democratic hold			

=== 2018 ===
2018 United States House of Representatives elections in California
Party	Candidate	Votes	%
Democratic	Brad Sherman (Incumbent)	191,573	73.4
Republican	Mark S. Reed	69,420	26.6
Total votes		260,993	100.0
Democratic hold			

=== 2020 ===
2020 United States House of Representatives elections in California
Party	Candidate	Votes	%
Democratic	Brad Sherman (incumbent)	240,038	69.5
Republican	Mark S. Reed	105,426	30.5
Total votes		345,464	100.0
Democratic hold			

=== 2022 ===
2022 United States House of Representatives elections in California
Party	Candidate	Votes	%
Democratic	Adam Schiff (incumbent)	150,100	71.1
Democratic	G "Maebe A. Girl" Pudlo	60,968	28.9
Total votes		211,068	100.0
Democratic hold			

=== 2024 ===
California's 30th congressional district, 2024
Primary election
Party	Candidate	Votes	%
Democratic	Laura Friedman	46,329	30.1
Republican	Alex Balekian	26,826	17.4
Democratic	Anthony Portantino	20,459	13.3
Democratic	Mike Feuer	18,878	12.3
Democratic	Maebe A. Girl	15,791	10.3
Republican	Emilio Martinez	6,775	4.4
Democratic	Ben Savage	6,147	4.0
Democratic	Nick Melvoin	4,134	2.7
Democratic	Jirair Ratevosian	2,889	1.9
Democratic	Sepi Shyne	2,126	1.4
Democratic	Courtney Simone Najera	1,167	0.8
No party preference	Joshua Bocanegra	780	0.5
Democratic	Steve Dunwoody	727	0.5
Democratic	Francisco Arreaga	532	0.3
Democratic	Sal Genovese	442	0.3
Total votes		154,002	100.0
General election
Democratic	Laura Friedman	213,100	68.4
Republican	Alex Balekian	98,559	31.6
Total votes		311,659	100.0
Democratic hold			

== Historical district boundaries ==
Before the 2013 redistricting resulting from the 2010 United States census and the 2012 elections, the western Los Angeles County district was represented by Democrat Henry A. Waxman. From 2003 to 2013 the district included many of the cities and suburbs of western Greater Los Angeles, most notably Hollywood, West Hollywood, Beverly Hills, Santa Monica, Pacific Palisades, Malibu and Topanga, Calabasas, Agoura Hills, Woodland Hills.

== See also ==
- List of United States congressional districts
- California's congressional districts
