= Sepi Shyne =

American politician (born 1977)

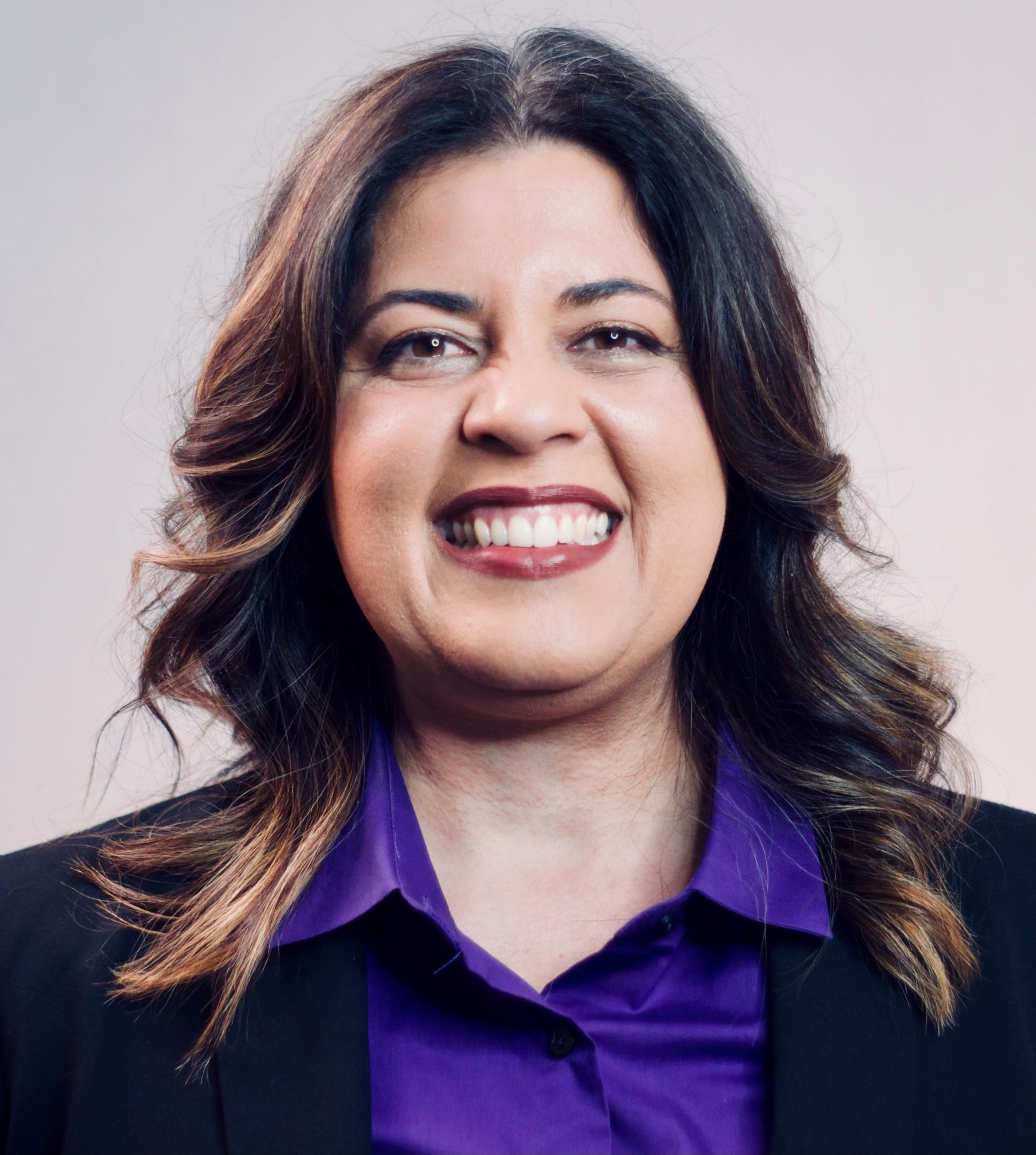
- Official portrait, 2021

Mayor of West Hollywood
- In office January 9, 2023 – January 16, 2024
- Preceded by: Lauren Meister
- Succeeded by: John M. Erickson

Mayor pro Tempore of West Hollywood
- In office August 16, 2021 – January 9, 2023
- Preceded by: Lauren Meister
- Succeeded by: John M. Erickson

Member of the West Hollywood City Council
- In office December 7, 2020 – December 16, 2024
- Preceded by: John Heilman
- Succeeded by: Danny Hang

Personal details
- Born: Sepideh Ghafouri; February 19, 1977 (age 49) Mashhad, Iran
- Party: Democratic
- Spouse: Ashlei Shyne (m. 2014; sep. 2022)
- Education: San Jose State University (BS); Golden Gate University School of Law (JD)

Sepideh Shyne (née Ghafouri; born February 19, 1977) is an Iranian-born American attorney, civil rights advocate, and former member of the West Hollywood City Council who served as West Hollywood's mayor from 2023 until 2024. Shyne was the first LGBTQ+ Iranian-American to be elected to office as well as the first woman of color elected to the West Hollywood City Council, with her election making the first female-majority council in the city's history. She was an unsuccessful candidate to represent California's 30th congressional district in the 2024 election to succeed Adam Schiff who vacated the seat to run for the U.S. Senate.

== Early life and career ==
Shyne was born Sepideh Ghafouri on February 19, 1977, in Mashhad, Iran, with her family fleeing Iran in 1982 due to the Iranian Revolution. They moved to Santa Clara Valley, California, where she attended De Anza College and later transferred to San Jose State University where she earned her Bachelor of Science. She later got her Juris Doctor at Golden Gate University School of Law before moving to Los Angeles in 2006, relocating to West Hollywood afterwards. In 2009, she founded the company Soulillume, which specializes in reiki.

== Political career ==
After graduating from law school, Shyne was elected to the Bay Area Lawyers for Individual Freedom. After moving to West Hollywood, she was elected to the LGBT Bar Association of Los Angeles, becoming its co-president in 2008.

In 2018, Shyne was appointed to West Hollywood's Gay and Lesbian Advisory Board, where her colleges encouraged her to get into electoral politics. That year, she announced that she would be running for West Hollywood City Council, but lost to incumbent John D’Amico by a small margin. She then ran in the next election in 2020, where she won the top seat in the election. She was sworn in on December 7, 2020.

On August 16, 2021, West Hollywood Mayor Lindsey Horvath selected Shyne as the new Mayor pro Tempore, with the City Council unanimously voting in favor of her appointment. On December 19, 2022, the City Council voted to appoint Shyne as the next Mayor, succeeding Lauren Meister. She was sworn in on January 9, 2023. In February 2023, Shyne announced that she would be running for California's 30th congressional district, an open seat vacated by incumbent Adam Schiff's run for Senate. She lost the primary against Laura Friedman and Alex Balekian, conceding defeat on March 6, 2024. In April 2024, Shyne announced that she would not be seeking re-election to the City Council.

== Personal life ==
Shyne is a lesbian. In 2014, Shyne married actress Ashlei Shyne and took her last name.

Although she grew up as a Muslim, she no longer practices the faith, although she has described herself as "very spiritual." She has a pet dog, Chloe Shyne, who as part of West Hollywood's Pet Mayor program was sworn in as the first Pet Mayor of West Hollywood on April 1, 2023.
