= Ben Savage =

American actor (born 1980)

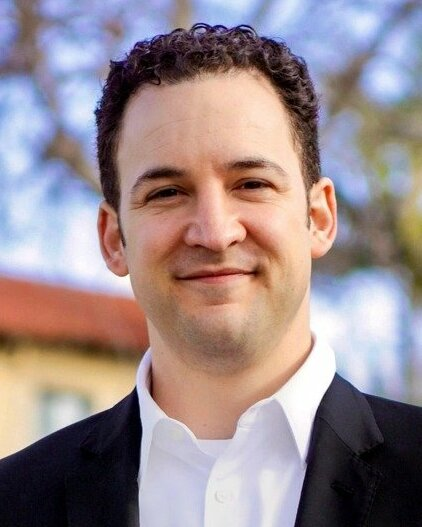
- Savage in 2023
- Born: Bennett Joseph Savage; September 13, 1980 (age 45); Chicago, Illinois, U.S.
- Occupation: Actor
- Years active: 1988–2022
- Political party: Democratic
- Spouse: Tessa Angermeier (m. 2023)
- Children: 1
- Relatives: Fred Savage (brother); Kala Savage (sister)

Bennett Joseph Savage (born September 13, 1980) is an American actor. He played the lead role of Cory Matthews on the ABC sitcom Boy Meets World (1993–2000) and its Disney Channel sequel Girl Meets World (2014–2017).

== Early life ==
Savage was born in Chicago, Illinois, to Joanne and Lewis Savage (1946–2015), who worked as an industrial real estate broker and a consultant. His elder brother is actor and director Fred Savage, and his elder sister is actress and musician Kala Savage. His grandparents were Jewish and from Poland, Ukraine, Germany, and Latvia, and Savage was raised in Reform Judaism.

== Career ==
=== Acting ===
Savage made his film debut at the age of 9 in his elder brother Fred Savage's Little Monsters (1989) and appeared in the feature films Big Girls Don't Cry... They Get Even (1992), as Sam, the brainy little brother, and as a 10-year-old in Clifford (1994), the latter starring Martin Short. Savage's stage debut was in The Laughter Epidemic at the Pasadena Playhouse. He also guest starred on his brother Fred's TV series The Wonder Years in the season three episode "The St. Valentine's Day Massacre" as a Cupid-esque character named Curtis Hartsell.

His first significant speaking role on network television was playing the recurring role of Matthew, son of the Judd Hirsch character, on the comedy series Dear John (1988). He was one of a family of orphans who con Robert Mitchum into being their guardian in A Family for Joe (NBC, 1990).

Savage is best known for his role as lead character Cory Matthews on the hit TV sitcom Boy Meets World from 1993 until 2000. Savage's brother Fred appeared alongside him in one episode, guest starring as a lecherous college professor pursuing Cory's girlfriend. In the following season, Fred directed his brother and the cast in the episode "Family Trees," as Shawn (Rider Strong) discovers that the woman who raised him is not his biological mother.

Savage has also worked in several TV movies, including She Woke Up (1992) with Lindsay Wagner and McDonald's Family Theatre Presents: Aliens for Breakfast (1995), as a young teen whose breakfast cereal figure comes alive.

Savage received critical recognition for his portrayal of Coty Wyckoff, an angel-faced boy with the soul of a killer, in the ABC Event Series Wild Palms (1993).

In May 1998, Savage again received critical acclaim, this time for playing Roddy Stern in Tony Award-winner Israel Horovitz's rarely seen play Unexpected Tenderness at the Marilyn Monroe Theater. He received an Ovation Award for his performance.

In 2002, Savage starred in the film Swimming Upstream playing the best friend who was slightly immature but very supportive of his terminally ill friend.

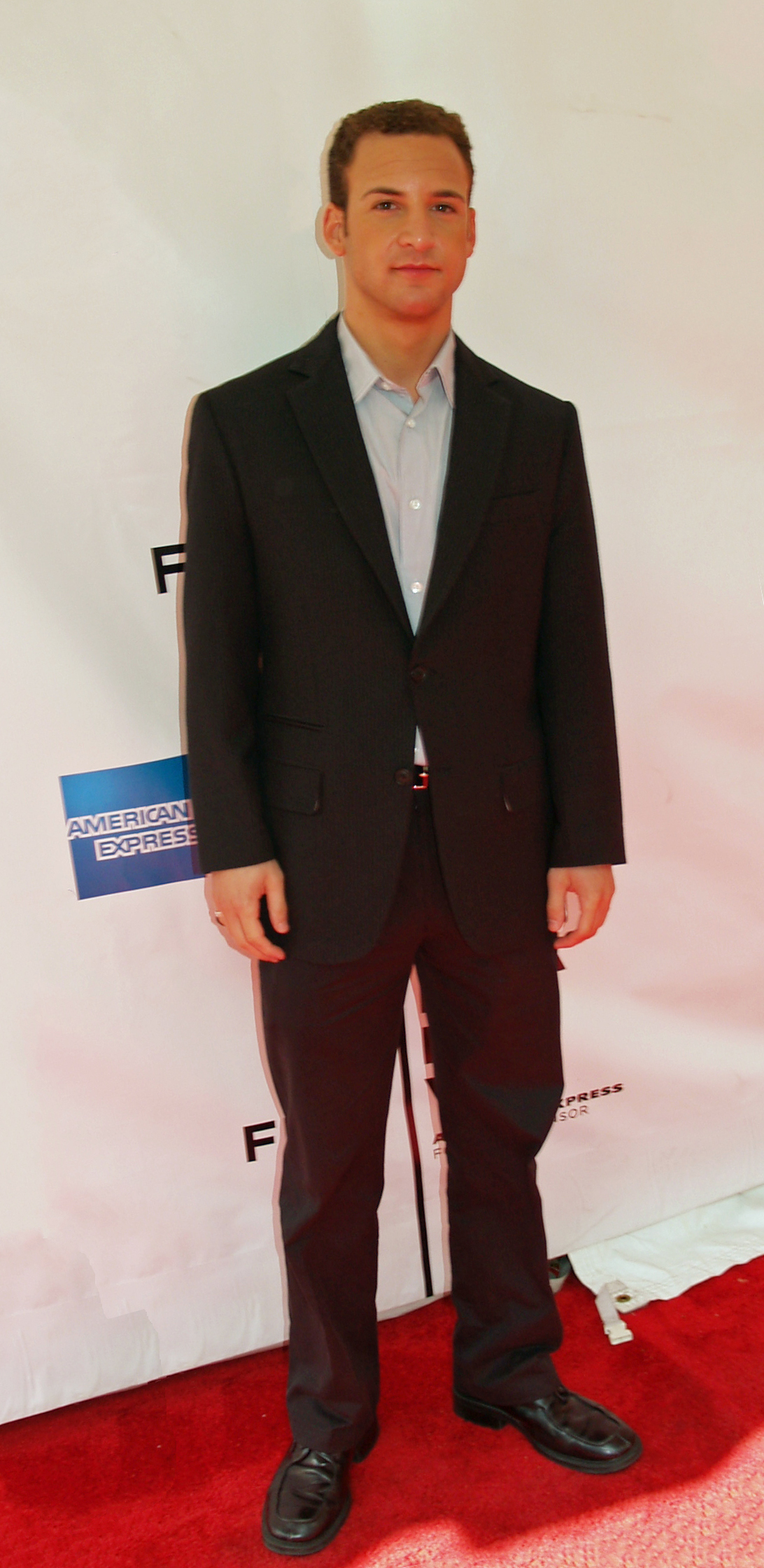
Savage in April 2007.

Savage took a break from acting in both film and television for three years, but he later made a guest appearance in Still Standing as Seth Cosella, the boss of Bill Miller, played by Mark Addy. That same year he starred as Ford Davis in the independent feature Car Babes, which was shot on location in Los Gatos, California, and also guest starred as himself in an episode of the Disney Channel original series Phil of the Future.

In 2006, he starred in the critically acclaimed independent film Palo Alto, which first premiered at the Tribeca Film Festival in 2007.

In 2008, he starred as Mark Ratner in an episode of the NBC series Chuck, as well as a murder suspect Kirby Morris in an episode of Without a Trace.

In 2011, he appeared in an episode of the Fox series Bones. He also guest starred on the Disney Channel series Shake It Up playing Andy Burns.

In November 2012, Savage announced via his Twitter account that he had signed on to the Boy Meets World spin-off series, Girl Meets World. The series premiered on the Disney Channel on June 27, 2014, and features Savage's character Cory and his Boy Meets World love interest Topanga (Danielle Fishel) married in their adult years with two children. The series follows Cory and Topanga's daughter Riley (Rowan Blanchard) as she enters middle school and tries to navigate through life. Besides being Riley's father, Cory is also her history teacher in this series; in addition to his on-screen role, Savage directed 10 episodes. The series was canceled after three seasons on January 5, 2017, with the final episode airing on January 20.

Savage has, on three occasions, portrayed younger versions of characters played by Mandy Patinkin in flashback scenes: in 2015 and 2020 in Criminal Minds, and in 2020 in Homeland.

In 2020, Savage starred in the television film Love, Lights, Hanukkah! for Hallmark. In 2022, he was cast in the Lifetime film Girl in the Shed: The Kidnapping of Abby Hernandez as part of its "Ripped from the Headlines" feature film series where he portrays Nathaniel Kibby.

=== Politics ===
Savage interned for U.S. Senator Arlen Specter (R–PA) in 2003 as a requirement for completing his studies at Stanford University, where he graduated in 2004 with a degree in political science and as a member of the Sigma Chi fraternity.

In August 2022, Savage qualified as a candidate for the West Hollywood City Council. He was not elected for one of the three at-large positions. In March 2023, Savage announced his campaign as a Democrat for California's 30th congressional district, held by Adam Schiff, who retired to run for United States Senate. He finished seventh in the blanket primary, behind state Assemblywoman Laura Friedman and five other candidates.

In October 2023, Savage signed an open letter written by Creative Community for Peace after the October 7 attacks. The article urged Hollywood to support Israel and support the country as it "defends itself against a terrorist regime in Gaza that seeks Israel’s destruction."

== Personal life ==
Savage married Tessa Angermeier in February 2023. He announced on May 20, 2025, via Instagram that he and his wife were expecting their first child in late 2025. Their baby was born in late November that same year.

== Filmography ==
=== Film ===
Year	Title	Role	Notes
1989	Little Monsters	Eric Stevenson	
1992	Big Girls Don't Cry... They Get Even	Sam	
1994	Clifford	Roger	
2002	Swimming Upstream	Teddy Benevides	
2006	Car Babes	Ford Davis	
2007	Palo Alto	Patrick	
2011	Peace and Riot	Scott	
2012	White Dwarf	Ben	
2012	The Caterpillar's Kimono	Lincoln	
2013	Girl Meets Boy	Scott	

=== Television ===
Year	Title	Role	Notes
1988	Dear John	Matthew Lacey	Recurring role; 5 episodes
1990	The Wonder Years	Curtis Hartsell	Episode: "The St. Valentine's Day Massacre"
1990	A Family for Joe	Chris Bankston	Main role
1990	Hurricane Sam	Sam Kelvin	Television film
1992	She Woke Up	Andy	Television film
1993	Wild Palms	Coty Wyckoff	Miniseries; main role
1993–2000	Boy Meets World	Cory Matthews	Lead role
1994	Aliens for Breakfast	Richard	Television film
1996	Maybe This Time	Cory Matthews	Episode: "Acting Out"
1996	Party of Five	Stuart	Episodes: "Close to You", "Christmas"
1998	Adventures from the Book of Virtues	Jinkyswoitmaya (voice)	Episode: "Determination"
2005	Still Standing	Seth Cosella	Episode: "Still the Boss"
2005	Phil of the Future	Himself	Episode: "Time Release Capsule"
2007	Making It Legal	Todd	Television film
2008	Chuck	Mark Ratner	Episode: "Chuck Versus the Cougars"
2008	Without a Trace	Kirby Morris	Episode: "Cloudy with a Chance of Gettysburg"
2011	Shake It Up	Andy Burns	Episode: "Review It Up"
2011	Bones	Hugh Burnside	Episode: "The Male in the Mail"
2012	Lake Effects	Carl	Television film
2014–2017	Girl Meets World	Cory Matthews	Main role; also co-producer and directed 10 episodes
2015–2020	Criminal Minds	Young Jason Gideon	Episodes: "Nelson's Sparrow", "Face Off"
2017	Still the King	Gene	Recurring role; 4 episodes
2018	Speechless	Stuart	Episode: "L-O-N--LONDON: Part 1"
2020	Homeland	Young Saul Berenson	Episode: "The English Teacher"
2020	Love, Lights, Hanukkah!	David	Television film
2022	Girl in the Shed: The Kidnapping of Abby Hernandez	Nathaniel Kibby	Television film

== Awards and nominations ==
Award	Year	Category	Work	Result
Kids' Choice Awards	2000	Favorite Television Friends	Boy Meets World	Won
Young Artist Awards	1990	Best Young Actor Starring in a Motion Picture	Little Monsters	Nominated
Young Artist Awards	1994	Best Youth Actor Leading Role in a Television Series	Boy Meets World	Nominated
Young Artist Awards	1997	Best Performance in a TV Comedy: Leading Young Actor	Boy Meets World	Nominated
Young Artist Awards	1998	Best Performance in a TV Comedy: Leading Young Actor	Boy Meets World	Nominated
YoungStar Awards	1998	Best Performance by a Young Actor in a Comedy TV Series	Boy Meets World	Nominated
