= Anthony Portantino =

American politician (born 1961)

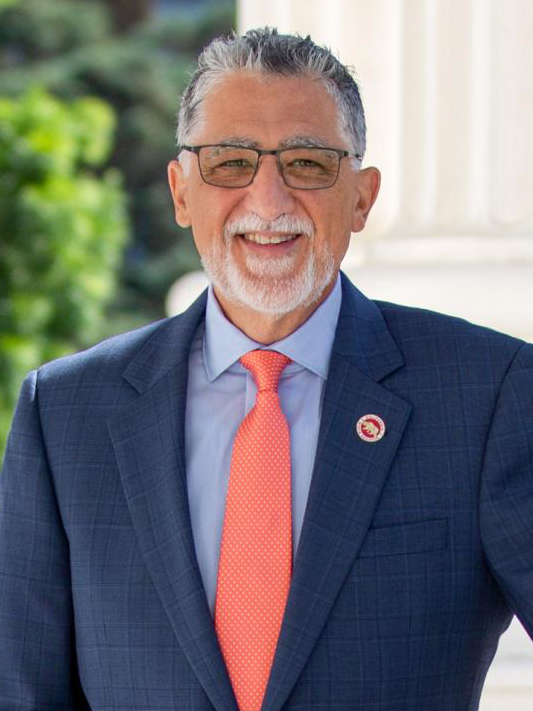
- Official portrait, 2022

Member of the California Senate from the 25th district
- In office December 5, 2016 – November 30, 2024
- Preceded by: Carol Liu
- Succeeded by: Sasha Renée Pérez

Member of the California State Assembly from the 44th district
- In office December 6, 2006 – November 30, 2012
- Preceded by: Carol Liu
- Succeeded by: Jeff Gorell

Personal details
- Born: January 29, 1961 (age 65) Long Branch, New Jersey, U.S.
- Party: Democratic
- Spouse: Ellen Gallagher
- Children: 2
- Education: Albright College (BS)

Anthony J. Portantino (born January 29, 1961) is an American politician who served in the California State Senate from 2016 to 2024. A Democrat, he represented the 25th Senate District which encompasses portions of the San Fernando and San Gabriel Valleys. Portantino was a member of the California State Assembly from 2006 to 2012, representing the 44th Assembly District.

Portantino has a history of blocking efforts to increase housing production in California. In 2019, he used a pocket veto to block the California Senate from considering SB 50, which would have allowed for denser housing construction near public transit. In 2021, he killed a bill that would have ended minimum parking requirements for some new housing near transit stations.

Portantino was a candidate in the 2024 election to succeed Adam Schiff as the U.S. representative from California's 30th congressional district. He placed third in the primary election, losing to Laura Friedman and Alex Balekian.

== Political career ==
Portantino served two terms on the La Cañada Flintridge City Council, from 1999 until 2006. There, he was mentored by Carol Liu, who endorsed him to succeed her in the California state assembly.

Portantino's professional experience includes working in the art department and as property master with the American Playhouse; production designer on Grizzly Adams and the Legend of Dark Mountain; and art director on Unsolved Mysteries.

At the request of the Screen Actors Guild in 2010, Portantino proposed an anti-gatecrashing law that would make party crashing a misdemeanor with punishments being up to six months in jail, or a $1,000 fine, or both. He said that party crashing posed a threat to public safety. He introduced legislation to remove tattoos from victims of forced prostitution.

After his term ended in the California State Assembly, Portantino initially stated that he would run for Congress against David Dreier, even though the district had yet to be drawn. He later contemplated a run against Carol Liu in state senate district 25 but opted against it, citing personal reasons. In 2013, Portantino began actively campaigning to fill Liu's seat, as she was term limited in 2016.

In 2022, he authored a bill that would provide $1.65 billion in tax credits through 2030 ($330 million per year) for film production in California.

Portantino announced in January 2023 that he was running for California's 30th congressional district to replace Adam Schiff, who is vacating the seat as a candidate in the 2024 United States Senate election in California.

== Political positions ==
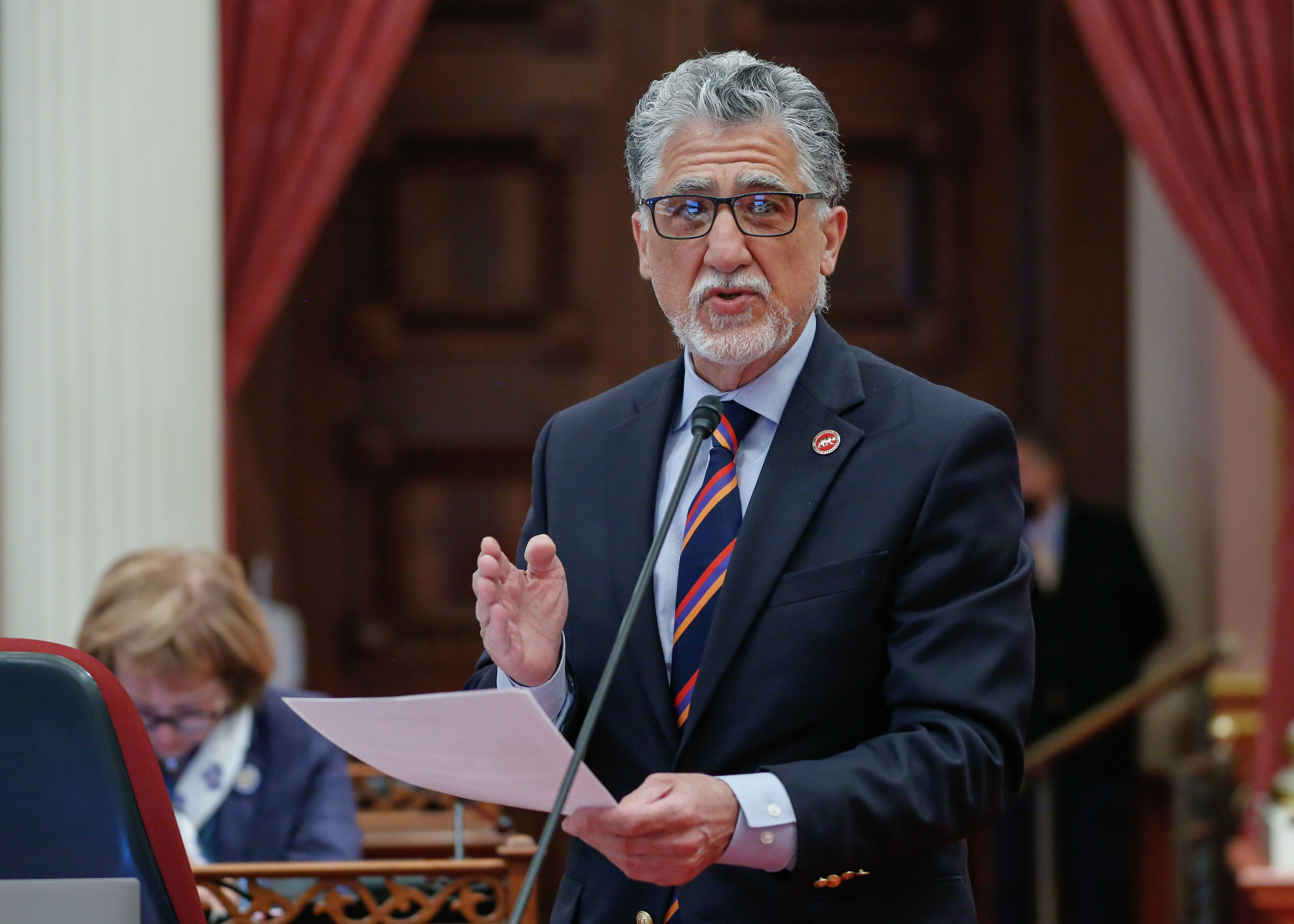
Portantino speaks on the Senate floor, 2022.

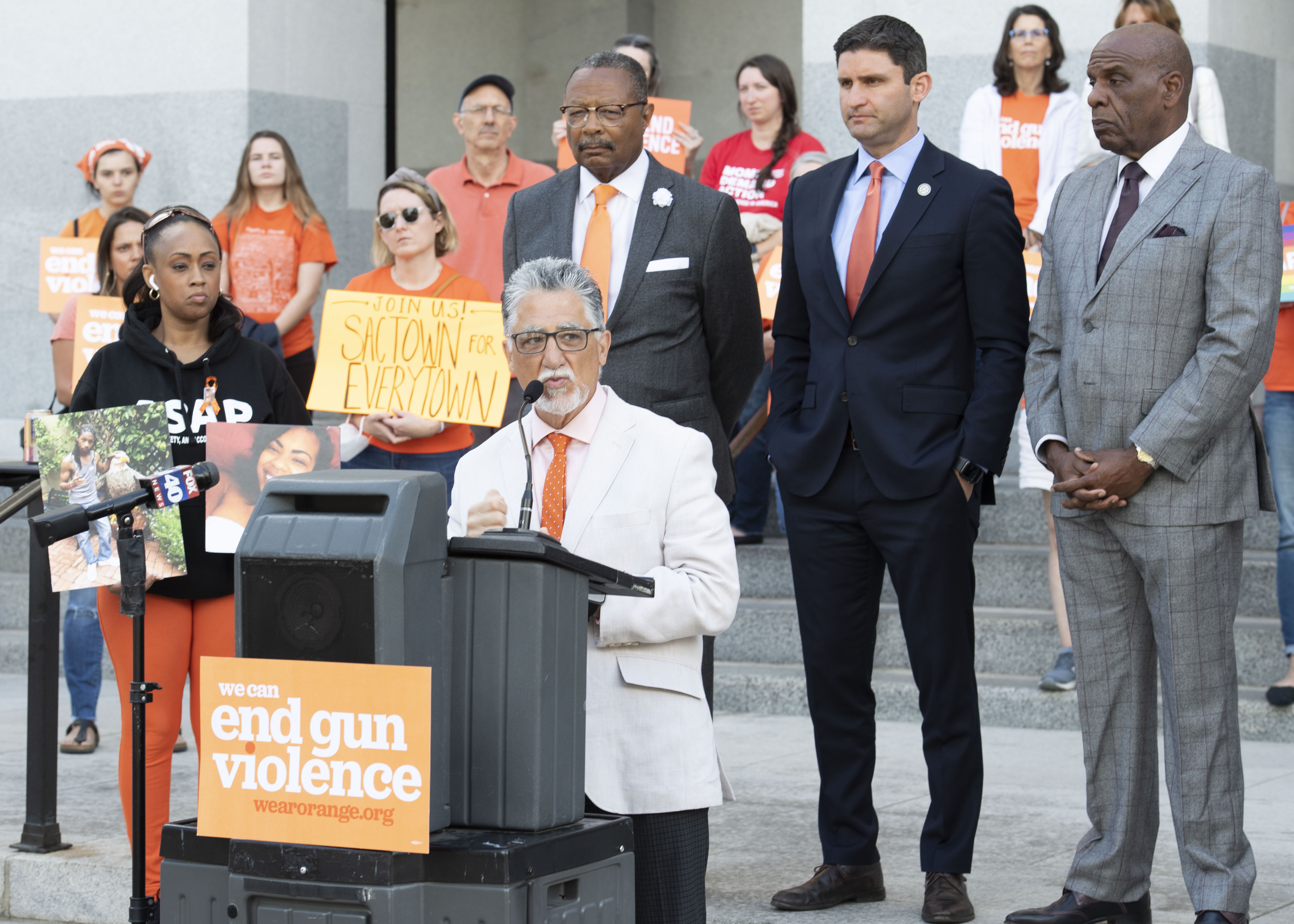
Portantino speaking for gun violence prevention, 2022.

=== Neurodiversity and Youth Mental Health ===
Portantino’s legislative record reflects responsive and effective policymaking of a breadth of issues related to neurodiversity.

After six years of legislative effort, Portantino’s Senate Bill 805 was signed into law in 2023, expanding service and treatment options for autism. The bill was supported by advocacy groups such as DIR/Floortime Coalition of California.

California’s 2023-2024 budget included funding for K–2 screening for reading difficulties, including dyslexia, the culmination of three years of advocacy by Portantino and allies. The policy was supported by groups such as the California PTA, California School Psychologists Association, and Decoding Dyslexia CA.

In 2024, Portantino's Senate Bill 357 was passed, removing language from the vehicle code that discriminates against conditions such as epilepsy, protecting the doctor-patient relationship and improving access to care. The legislation was endorsed by the American Epilepsy Society and the Epilepsy Foundation Los Angeles.

In 2022, Senate Bill 1016 improved educational access for an estimated 300,000 California students with Fetal Alcohol Spectrum Disorder (FASD).

Portantino also authored several bills related to youth mental health. In 2019, after several attempts, Senate Bill 328 was passed to align school start times with the biological clocks of teens, mandating a later start time for middle schools and high schools. In 2021, the governor signed Senate Bill 14, allowing student absences for behavioral health concerns to be treated the same as excused absences for physical health concerns. That same year, Senate Bill 224 was passed. The law, mandating mental health instruction in middle schools and high schools, was endorsed by National Alliance on Mental Illness – California, California Alliance of Child & Family Services, California Association of Student Councils, California Youth Empowerment Network, National Center for Youth Law, and the Children’s Partnership.

=== LGBTQ+ rights ===
In response by the 2012 decision of the U.S. 9th Circuit Court of Appeals to overturn Proposition 8, Portantino stated “My brother fought this battle for three decades. He spent his life fighting for equality and civil rights. It was a lifelong dream of his to be treated like everyone else.”

In 2022, Portantino attended Glendale Pride.

Portantino attended a December 2022 candlelight vigil hosted by glendaleOUT to mourn and remember LGBTQ+ deaths. The vigil raised funds for the Transgender Law Center and Pink Armenia.

In 2023, glendaleOUT acknowledged Portantino with their Crown Jewel Award, "for being the only elected official who showed up to our events throughout the year[.]"

=== Armenia and Artsakh ===
Portantino, who has been collaborating with California Governor Gavin Newsom’s office to educate state officials and colleagues on the historic significance of the project, thanked the Governor for signing California's 2022-2023 State Budget, which allocates $10 million in new funding for the Armenian American Museum.

During a 2022 meeting with the Armenian National Committee of America, Portantino expressed a desire to improve trade relations between California and Armenia.

=== Zoning regulations and housing ===
In 2017, Portantino voted against SB 35, which streamlined the housing construction process in California.

In February 2019, Portantino introduced a bill to create a “California Housing Crisis Awareness” specialized license plate program to raise an estimated $300,000 per year to fund affordable housing, before administrative costs. The bill later died in committee.

In May 2019, Portantino, as Senate appropriations committee chair, used a pocket veto to temporarily block SB 50, a bill that would enact reforms to address the California housing shortage by reducing local control (such as allowing more apartment construction near public transit and in suburbs), from leaving committee to enter the Senate for debate and voting. Proponents of the bill accused Portantino of abusing his powers to deny Senate Bill 50 a debate and a vote in the Senate. The Los Angeles Times wrote that Portantino's opposition to the bill was expected, but that it was a surprise that he would not allow the bill to advance out of committee. Due to Portantino's action, the bill was not considered by the Senate until 2020.

In 2021, Portantino killed a bill that would have put an end to minimum parking requirements for certain new housing construction near transit stations.

In October 2021, Portantino criticized the construction of 98 townhouses on the location of a bowling center and recreation center in Burbank. Portantino questioned the legality of the housing development.
