= Jirair Ratevosian =

American policy advisor (born 1980)

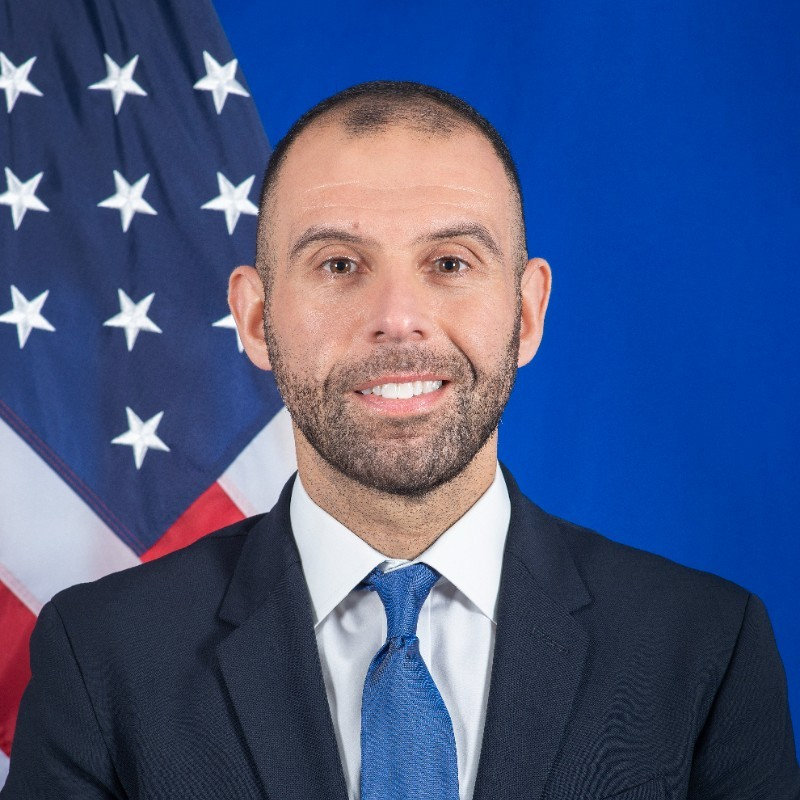
- Born: 1980 (age 45–46); Los Angeles, California, U.S.
- Education: University of California, Los Angeles (BA); Boston University (MPH); Johns Hopkins University (DPH)
- Political party: Democratic
- Website: jirairforca.com

Jirair Ratevosian (born 1980) is an American policy advisor specializing in global health and human rights who served as the acting chief of staff to the United States Global AIDS Coordinator from 2022 to 2023. Ratevosian was previously a legislative director to U.S. representative Barbara Lee.

== Early life ==
Ratevosian was born in 1980 in Hollywood, Los Angeles, to a Lebanese mother and Armenian father. His mother was born and raised in Lebanon until immigrating to the United States in 1976 due to the Lebanese Civil War. Ratevosian's father was born in Siberia as a result of his paternal grandfather being sent there due to his anti-communist activism in the Armenian Soviet Socialist Republic. He was named after his paternal grandfather, Jirair, who was a shoe cobbler, community organizer, and small business owner. His parents met in Hollywood. His mother worked at McDonald's and his father was a liquor store manager.

Ratevosian was raised in Sun Valley, Los Angeles. He earned a bachelor's degree in physiology and political science at the University of California, Los Angeles in 2003. Ratevosian completed a two-year medical postbaccalaureate program through University of California, San Francisco. Influenced by a 2004 trip to South Africa where he witnessed the HIV/AIDS epidemic, he pursued public health. In 2007, he completed a M.P.H. at the Boston University School of Public Health.

== Career ==
Following his graduation from Boston University, Ratevosian worked with the Boston Public Health Commission on HIV funding. He worked as a national field organizer for the health action AIDS campaign of the Physicians for Human Rights. He later became the deputy director of public policy of amfAR and worked on its syringe access programs.

In May 2011, Ratevosian joined the office of U.S. representative Barbara Lee as a legislative director. He led budget, appropriations, and the reauthorization of President's Emergency Plan for AIDS Relief (PEPFAR) in 2013. In August 2014, Ratevosian joined Gilead Sciences as its government affairs director. He led corporate social responsibility and partnership relations.

During the presidential transition of Joe Biden, Ratevosian served as a policy advisor on national security, COVID-19, and global health. In August 2021, he joined the Office of the United States Global AIDS Coordinator (S/GAC) as a senior advisor for health equity policy. In 2022, he became the acting chief of staff to the Global AIDS Coordinator John Nkengasong. He departed PEPFAR in early 2023. In 2023, Ratevosian earned a DrPH with a concentration in implementation science at the Johns Hopkins Bloomberg School of Public Health.. His doctoral research evaluated COVAX, the global initiative to promote equitable access to COVID-19 vaccines, and its implications for pandemic preparedness.

Ratevosian was a Democratic candidate in the 2024 California's 30th congressional district election. Ultimately, he finished 9th out of 15 candidates in the primary election.

In 2024, Ratevosian joined the Duke Global Health Institute as its inaugural Hock Fellow. His research focuses on HIV policy, global health governance and the potential use of emerging technologies, including generative artificial intelligence, to improve access to care.

Ratevosian serves on the board of directors for AIDS United, Equality California Aurum USA, and Victory Fund. He has served on the Presidential Advisory Council on HIV/AIDS (PACHA) and is a senior associate (non-resident) with the Global Health Policy Center at the Center for Strategic and International Studies (CSIS).

== Political positions ==
=== Israel-Palestine ===
He supports the Ceasefire Now movement and has drawn parallels to his own lived experience as an Armenian American.

=== LGBTQ+ rights ===
Ratevosian considers himself a progressive. He is pro-LGBTQ+ and has proposed a Gay Agenda for Congress to protect the rights of LGBTQ+ individuals.

In a 2024 op-ed cowritten with Laura Friedman, Ratevosian noted that "LGBTQI individuals who also belong to ethnic minority communities, such as Black, Latino, Asian, or Armenian, face disproportionate systemic injustices. They often find themselves at the crossroads of multiple forms of discrimination."

== Personal life ==
Ratevosian came out as gay in 2014. In January 2020, he met Micheal Ighodaro, the former director of global Policy advocacy at the Prevention Access Campaign. Ighodaro is a gay Nigerian from Benin City who was granted asylum. They married on October 9, 2023 in a ceremony at St. Michael's Episcopal Church in Manhattan..
