= Lorraine Fontana =

American lesbian activist

- Born: 1947; Queens
- Education: People's College of Law, Queens College, Atlanta Law School
- Occupations: Civil rights advocate, writer, paralegal, women's rights activist, LGBT rights activist
- Employers: AmeriCorps VISTA; Georgia Legal Services Program; The Great Speckled Bird; United States Equal Employment Opportunity Commission

Lorraine Fontana (born 1947) is an American lesbian activist and founder of the Atlanta Lesbian Feminist Alliance.

== Early life ==
Fontana was born in Queens, New York, to an Italian American family. She was inspired to become involved with racial justice movements after seeing the civil rights movement on TV as a child.

== Career and activism ==
In 1968, Fontana first came to Atlanta as a volunteer for VISTA under President Lyndon B. Johnson's War on Poverty, where she helped organize food buying clubs in poor neighborhoods.

Fontana was a writer for the Great Speckled Bird while she attended a psychology graduate program at Emory University. She dropped out of the program to pursue community organizing, where she met women involved with the Atlanta Women's Liberation, the Georgia Gay Liberation Front, and the Anti-Imperialist Coalition. During this time, Fontana lived in a collective household in the Little Five Points neighborhood.

Feeling alienated from the lack of queer representation in Atlanta Women's Liberation and the male-dominated Gay Liberation Front, Fontana, along with, among others, Diana Kaye, Elaine Kolb, Corinne Smith, Martha Smith, Marianna Kaufman, Helen Schietinger, Marilyn Langfeld, Sally Gabby, Pam Norris (Hatchet), and Vicki Gabriner, founded the Atlanta Lesbian Feminist Alliance. She lived in ALFA's Mansfield Street house, also known as the ALFA House, which served as the organization's hub. Fontana was part of ALFA's political action committee, where she networked with the wider gay community to organize pride marches, anti KKK protests, anti-racist initiatives, and protests against the police. Additionally, Fontana helped establish the ALFA lending library and was an active contributor to the organization's newsletter. She pitched for ALFA's softball team, the Omegas.

In 1976, Fontana left ALFA and moved to Los Angeles to attend the People's College of Law from 1976 to 1979. At the People's College of Law, Fontana became a member of the caucuses for women, gay, and working-class students.

In 1979, Fontana returned to Atlanta and continued working with ALFA. She took on a role as an outreach communicator and organizer with other queer organizations in the city. She also served as the ALFA rep to the National Anti-Klan Network. In the mid-80s, Fontana worked with Black White Men Together to pass an antiracist, anti-discrimination ordinance in Atlanta's bars.

After that, Fontana earned her J.D. from Atlanta Law School in 1981. From 1980 to 1983, she worked in the Atlanta office of the National Jury Project, which worked to support progressive trial lawyers. From 1999 to 2004, she worked as a paralegal for New York City's EEOC. In 2006, she worked as a legal assistant for Georgia's Lambda Legal Education & Defense Fund.

Fontana remains active in Atlanta's LGBTQ+ community and in social justice organizing. She is currently supports the First Existentialist Congregation of Atlanta's Social Justice Guild, the Georgia Peace & Justice Coalition, Charis Books, the Atlanta Grandmothers for Peace, SAGE Atlanta, and Southerners On New Ground. Additionally, Fontana has been a mainstay at many Atlanta pro-equality rallies and protests for decades.

She is also involved with the Moral Monday movement, participating in civil disobedience initiatives to protest a wide range of issues related to discrimination, conservative government legislation, and unfair treatment.

In 2023–24, Fontana was involved in the protests against Atlanta's Cop City, a police training facility. Channel 2 quoted her saying, "What we need is less cops, more people to help people in financial, health, mental health. We need that kind of health. We don’t need more police." She was arrested on June 29, 2023, on charges of criminal trespassing at a demonstration protesting Home Depot's financial support of the Atlanta Police Foundation.

== Personal life ==
She came out as lesbian in 1971.

== Legacy ==
Fontana was featured at the National Center for Civil & Human Rights in the Atlanta LGBTQ+ History Project: Out Down South Exhibition. Curated by Rachel Garbus & Sam Landis, the Out Down South exhibition presents stories of change-making LGBTQ+ Atlantans.

Fontana was also featured in a queer history exhibit at Georgia Tech. Exhibit curators gathered buttons from Fontana's and Maria Helena Dolan's personal collections, created replicas, and collected oral histories from the two women.
