= People's College of Law =

Defunct unaccredited private law school

Peoples College of Law
- Motto: Producing Social Justice Lawyers
- Established: 1974
- School type: Private law school
- Dean: Ira Spiro, Esq.
- Location: Los Angeles, CA, US; 34°03′23″N 118°16′25″W
- Website: www.peoplescollegeoflaw.edu

The Peoples College of Law (PCL) was an unaccredited private law school located in the downtown Los Angeles community of Westlake-MacArthur Park. PCL offered a part-time, four-year evening law program centered on work in the public interest. As of December 2023, there were seven students. The school closed by May 31, 2024 due to accreditation and financial issues.

== History ==
Aimed at addressing inequities in law and society, PCL was founded in 1974 for individuals historically denied access to legal training and representation. The school maintained a socio-political requirement that stated: "An eligible candidate will be able to demonstrate a commitment to progressive social change."

On December 14, 2023, the State Bar's Committee of Bar Examiners approved termination of PCL's registration and degree granting authority effective May 31, 2024, to allow time for the remaining students to complete their legal education or transfer. PCL had been experiencing financial, leadership, and accreditation issues and probation by the State Bar for many years prior to its closure. One driving force behind its issues was PCL's reliance on an all-volunteer faculty and staff.

== State Bar registration ==
PCL was registered with the California State Bar Committee of Bar Examiners of the State Bar of California as an unaccredited fixed-facility law school that may grant the Juris Doctor (J.D.) degree. Its students must have taken and passed the First-Year Law Students' Examination, also known as the "baby bar", at the end of their first year in order to receive credit for their law study and eventually qualify to sit for the California Bar Examination.

It was not approved or accredited by the American Bar Association, nor was it accredited by the State Bar of California. On December 14, 2023, the State Bar's Committee of Bar Examiners approved termination of PCL's registration and degree granting authority effective May 31, 2024, to allow time for the remaining students to complete their legal education or transfer.

== Bar pass rates ==
From 2010 through 2018, 33 People's College graduates took the California Bar Examination; of that number, 7 passed the examination for a pass rate of 18%.

== Cost ==
People's College of Law had one of the lowest tuition rates for a J.D. program in the United States. The annual tuition in 2022 was $5,000.

== Notable alumni ==
- Maria Elena Durazo, California State Senator for the 24th District and former Executive Secretary-Treasurer of the Los Angeles County Federation of Labor, AFL-CIO
- Gilbert Cedillo, former state senator and city councilor
- Jeff Cohen, commentator for Fox News Watch, MSNBC, and CNN
- Ilka Tanya Payán, AIDS activist, former New York City Human Rights Commissioner
- Antonio Villaraigosa, former Mayor of Los Angeles
- Lorraine Fontana, lesbian activist and founder of the Atlanta Lesbian Feminist Alliance
- B. Kwaku Duren, former coordinator of the Southern California Chapter of the Black Panther Party (1977-1982).
- Kent Wong, labor leader, educator, and scholar at the UCLA Labor Center

== See also ==
- List of defunct law schools in the United States
