= Gil Cedillo =

American politician

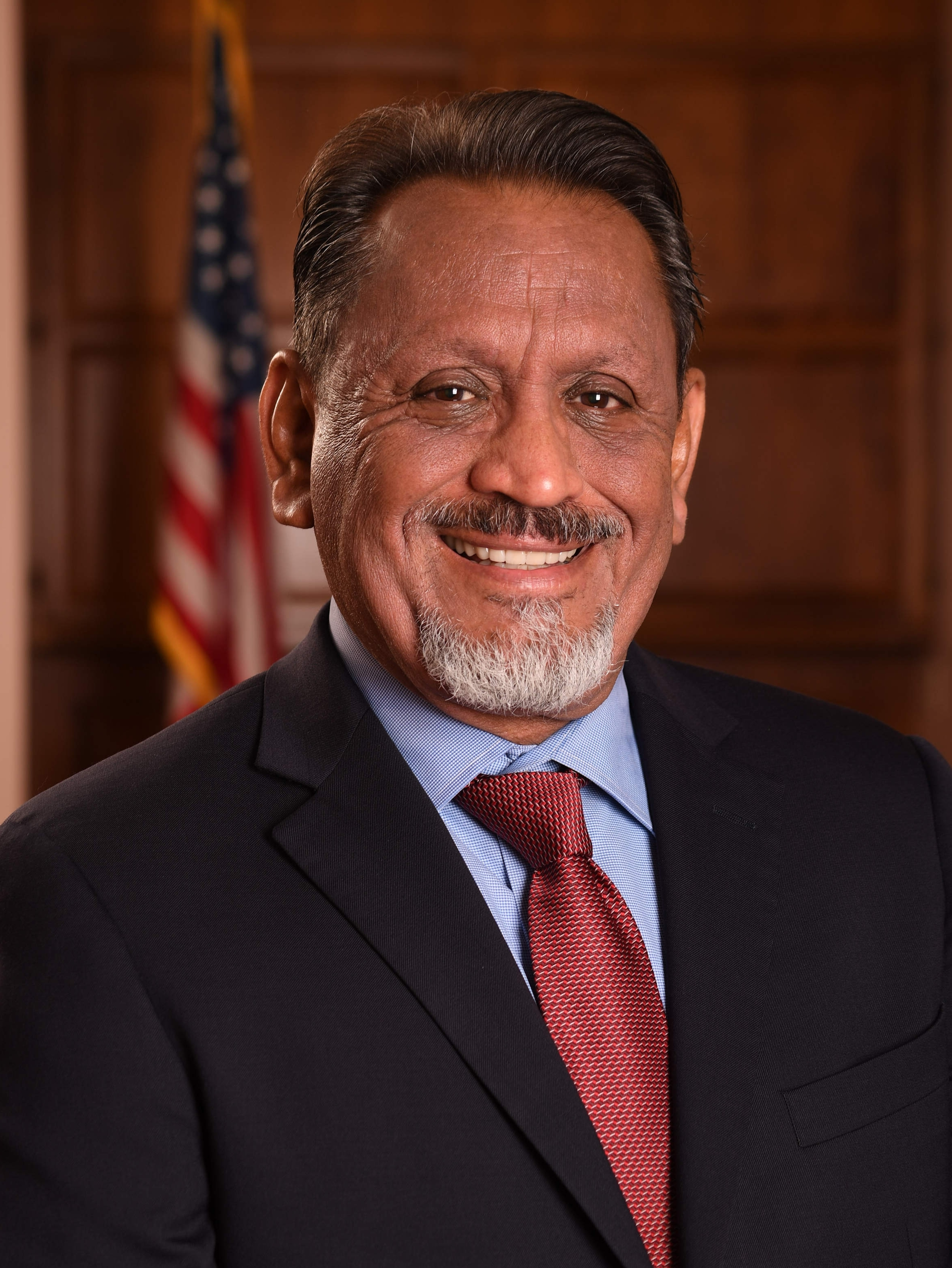
- Official portrait, 2018

Member of the Los Angeles City Council from the 1st district
- In office July 1, 2013 – December 11, 2022
- Preceded by: Ed Reyes
- Succeeded by: Eunisses Hernandez

Member of the California State Assembly from the 45th district
- In office December 6, 2010 – November 30, 2012
- Preceded by: Kevin de León
- Succeeded by: Bob Blumenfield

Member of the California Senate from the 22nd district
- In office December 2, 2002 – November 30, 2010
- Preceded by: Richard Polanco
- Succeeded by: Kevin de León

Member of the California State Assembly from the 46th district
- In office January 16, 1998 – November 30, 2002
- Preceded by: Louis Caldera
- Succeeded by: Fabian Núñez

Personal details
- Born: March 25, 1954 (age 72) Barstow, California, U.S.
- Party: Democratic
- Spouse: Ruby Oliva Cedillo (deceased)
- Children: 1
- Education: University of California, Los Angeles (BA); People's College of Law (JD)
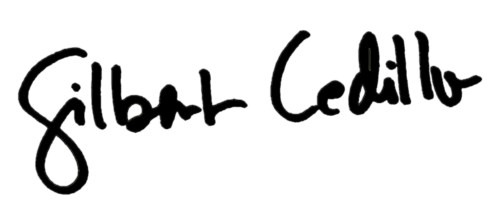
- Signature

Gilbert Anthony Cedillo (born March 25, 1954) is an American politician who served as a member of the Los Angeles City Council for the 1st district from 2013 to 2022. A member of the Democratic Party, Cedillo was previously a member of both the California State Assembly and the California State Senate.

When Hilda Solis joined the Obama administration, Cedillo became a candidate to replace her for California's 32nd congressional district seat, but lost to Judy Chu in the 2009 special election. Cedillo lost his Los Angeles City Council seat in the 2022 election to left-wing challenger Eunisses Hernandez. In October 2022, Cedillo faced widespread calls for his resignation after an audio recording of him and other council members making racist remarks was released. He was formally censured by the City Council in a unanimous 12-0 vote on October 26.

== Early life and education ==
Cedillo was born in Barstow, California and grew up in the Boyle Heights area of Los Angeles. His father worked as a mechanic at American Can in Vernon and was a member of the United Steelworkers of America. His mother was a garment worker at Sears and Times-Mirror Press.

Cedillo attended Lorena Street and Euclid Avenue Elementary, Stevenson Junior High and Roosevelt High.

In 1977, Cedillo earned a Bachelor's degree in Sociology from UCLA. In 1983, Cedillo earned a J.D. degree from the unaccredited People's College of Law, in Los Angeles.

Cedillo participated in Movimiento Estudiantil Chicano de Aztlan (MEChA).

== Organized labor ==
Cedillo worked for the Service Employees International Union (SEIU Local 660), Los Angeles County's largest union, where he served as general manager from 1990 to 1996. In his years as general manager, he protected youth programs and played a critical role in securing $364 million in federal assistance to ensure that the Los Angeles County Health Care system remained afloat. President Bill Clinton stated that his decision to provide funding "was reached after critical consultations with SEIU". Cedillo was fired from the union after losing a power struggle with Local 660's board of directors.

== California State Assembly and State Senate ==
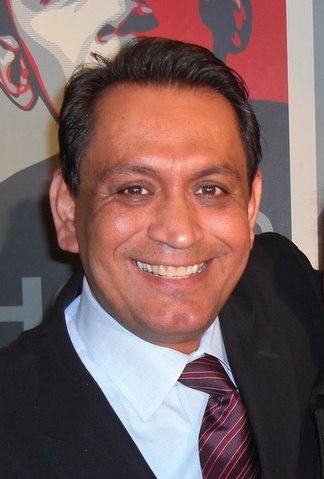
Cedillo as a State Senator in 2008.

Cedillo won a special election on January 13, 1998, to the California State Assembly's 46th district, and served there until 2002.

In 2002, he was elected to the State Senate. Cedillo attempted to have driver's licenses to undocumented immigrants reinstated, and was the author of the California DREAM Act. He also worked on increasing and expanding access to health care, developing regional solutions to combat homelessness, and encouraging economic development in his Downtown Los Angeles district. Gil Cedillo is a member of the Council of La Raza.

Cedillo was re-elected in 2006, defeating South Pasadena City Councilman Mike Ten, a Republican. Cedillo received 71,199 votes, Ten received 18,581 votes, and Murray Levy, a Libertarian candidate, received 3,469 votes. He was Chair of the Senate Select Committee on Immigration and the Economy and was a member of the Senate standing committees on Appropriations, Health, Public Safety, Rules, and Transportation and Housing.

On September 28, 2006, Cedillo was arrested along with approximately 200 others for blocking Century Blvd. in front of LAX, during a protest supporting the right for employees to unionize at the LAX hotels.

=== Congressional candidate ===
On January 8, 2009, Cedillo announced his candidacy for the 32nd Congressional District seat, which was vacated by Congresswoman Hilda Solis. Congresswoman Solis accepted an appointment from President-elect Barack Obama as United States Labor Secretary. In the blanket primary (now superseded by Proposition 14's "top two" primary system), Cedillo competed against Judy Chu, a former Monterey Park assemblywoman and vice-chairman of the State Board of Equalization; the Los Angeles County Federation of Labor, AFL-CIO, voted to endorse Chu. Cedillo received a majority of other major endorsements, including eight members of California's Congressional Delegation, LA Sheriff Lee Baca, Los Angeles Police Chief Bill Bratton, and more than 100 current and former public officials, including Senator Gloria Romero, Senator Ron Calderon, and Assemblymember Ed Chavez, who all dropped out of the race and endorsed Cedillo. Chu defeated Cedillo with 15,338 votes (31.9%) to Cedillo's 11,244 votes (23.4%).

Following his failed bid for U.S. Congress, Cedillo was elected to the California State Assembly's 45th District seat in 2010. The seat had been vacated by Kevin de León, who won the 22nd State Senate seat. Cedillo served as chairman of California's Latino Congressional Caucus. In 2010, Cedillo authored California's SRC 113, a resolution for a statewide boycott of the State of Arizona, following Arizona's passage of SB 1070, an undocumented immigration enforcement bill.

=== Driver's licenses for undocumented immigrants ===
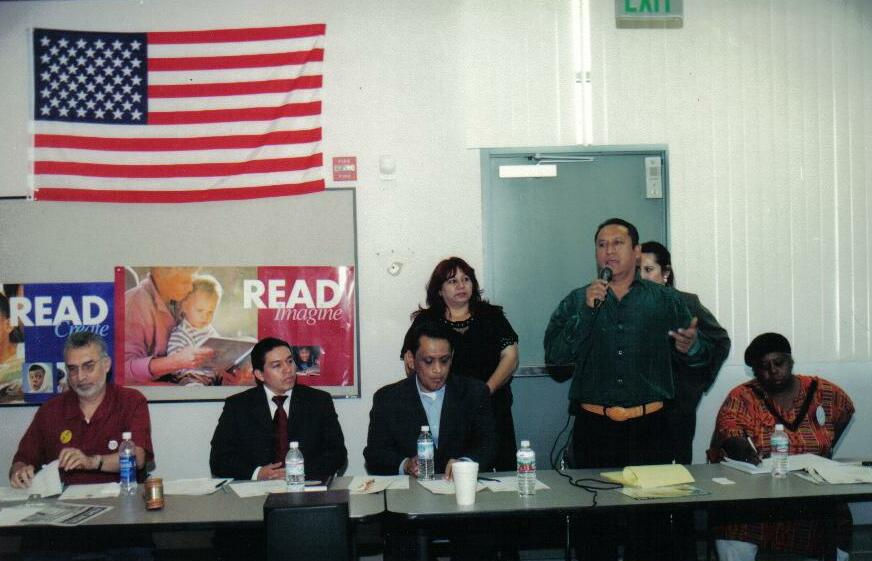
Cedillo at a forum in 2009.

Cedillo tried nine times, since 1998, to get bills passed in the California State Legislature that would allow undocumented immigrants in California to obtain driver's licenses. In 2001 and 2002 Governor Gray Davis vetoed two of Cedillo's bills that would have permitted this. In the midst of the 2003 recall election, Davis backed and signed SB 60 (2003), Cedillo's driver's license bill. After Davis was recalled and Arnold Schwarzenegger became governor, the state legislature, with Schwarzenegger's support, repealed the new law before it went into effect. Senator Cedillo agreed to repeal the law he wrote under the agreement with the Governor to work on a bipartisan bill. In 2004, Schwarzenegger vetoed AB 2895, an identical bill to Senator Cedillo's SB 1160 that stalled in the legislature, saying that it did not meet his security concerns. The governor wanted a "marked license" that was identifiable. AB 2895 was introduced to the legislature by one of Cedillo's closest allies, Speaker of the Assembly Fabian Núñez.

In 2005, Cedillo authored SB 60, another driver's license bill. He made new modifications to the proposal, specifying that undocumented immigrants would not be able to use the driver's license for purposes of identification for boarding airplanes, opening bank accounts, registering to vote, or other rights of U.S. citizens. Again, Schwarzenegger refused to sign the bill, on the grounds that it did not satisfy his security concerns. After Schwarzenegger vetoed the bill, Cedillo threatened to file a lawsuit against the Governor because of his belief that the Department of Motor Vehicles misinterpreted SB 976 (1993), which first prohibited the issuance of driver's licenses to undocumented immigrants. Undocumented immigrants in the process of becoming legal residents, and citizens considered to have authorized presence but not legal permanent residency status, are known as people residing under the color of the law.

In 2006 and 2009 Cedillo again brought the proposal before the California legislature, failing both times. On October 3, 2013, California Governor Brown signed AB 60, allowing undocumented immigrants to obtain driver's licenses. Cedillo remarked, ″It took a long time, but now it’s here. Today signifies much more than just another bill being signed by our governor. Today is history in the making because it is the day we return justice back to the people.″

=== California Dream Act ===
In 2011, Cedillo authored a pair of assembly bills to allow undocumented immigrants to obtain financial aid for universities through both private and public sources. The assembly bills, known as AB 130 and AB 131 for private and public financial aid respectively, became law. The measures have drawn both praise and criticism from various organizations. Proponents state that the bill would finally narrow the large gap in education for a US citizen and an undocumented immigrant, thus providing equality and greater opportunity. Critics claim that the measure is a waste of taxpayer money for an already cash-strapped California with tuition costs increasing and many students unable to continue their education.

=== AB 353 ===
In August 2011, at nearly the same time AB 131 was passed by the Senate, AB 353 also passed. The bill allows drivers without a license who are stopped at checkpoints to have a licensed driver retrieve the vehicle and thereby avoid having the vehicle impounded for 30 days.

=== Filed for backpay during recession ===
In 2010, Cedillo attempted to reverse a pay cut approved by voters in 2009 for all 120 lawmakers (Prop. 25). Cedillo filed a claim in December 2010 with the California Victim Compensation and Government Claims Board seeking back pay for what he maintains were illegal pay and benefit cuts. His complaint stemmed from the 2009 decision by the California Citizens Compensation Commission to slash legislators' pay and benefits by 18 percent. The cut reduced their remuneration from US$116,208 to $95,291.

== Los Angeles City Council (2013–2022) ==
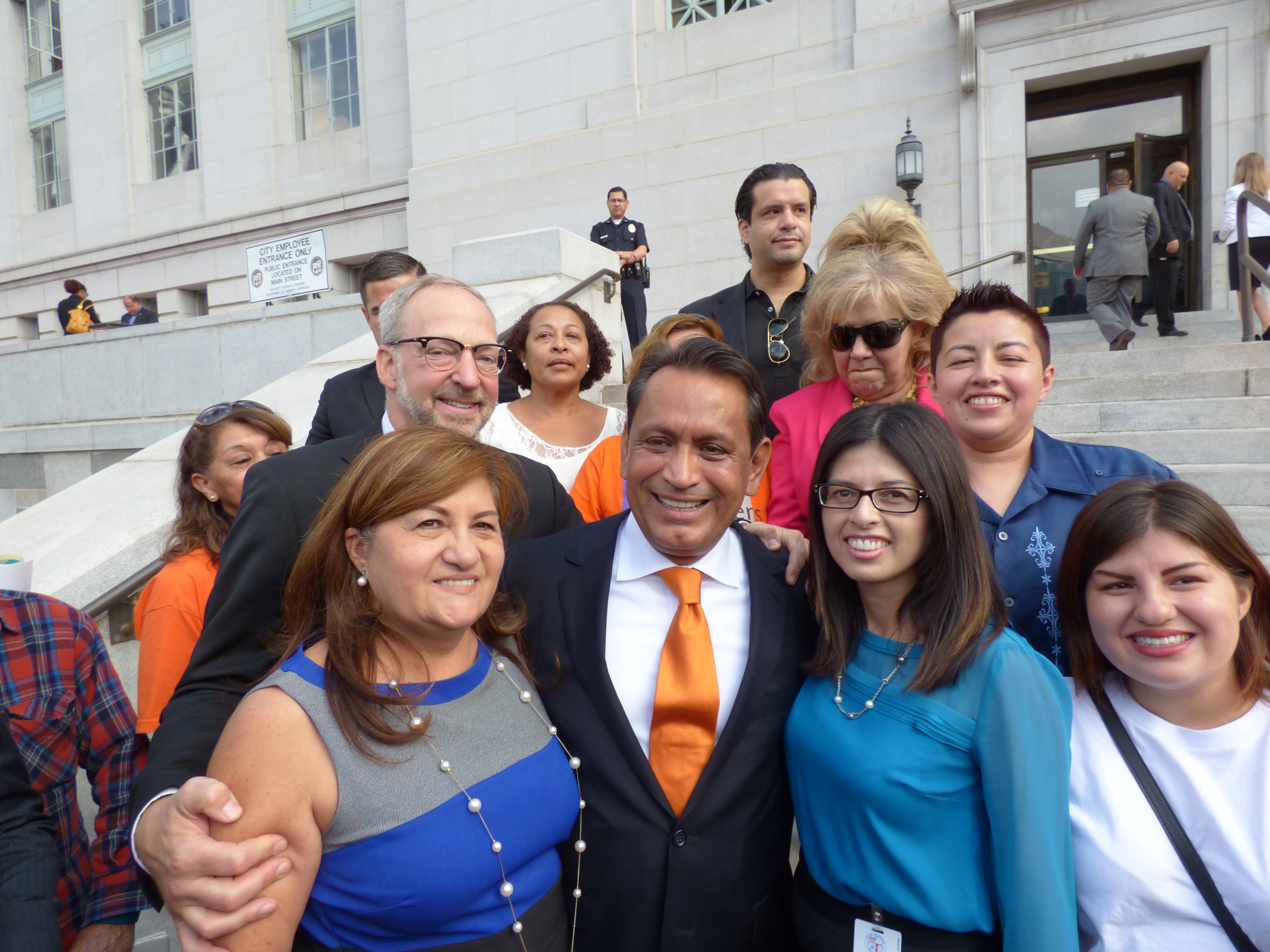
Cedillo (center) celebrating the signing of AB60 in 2013.

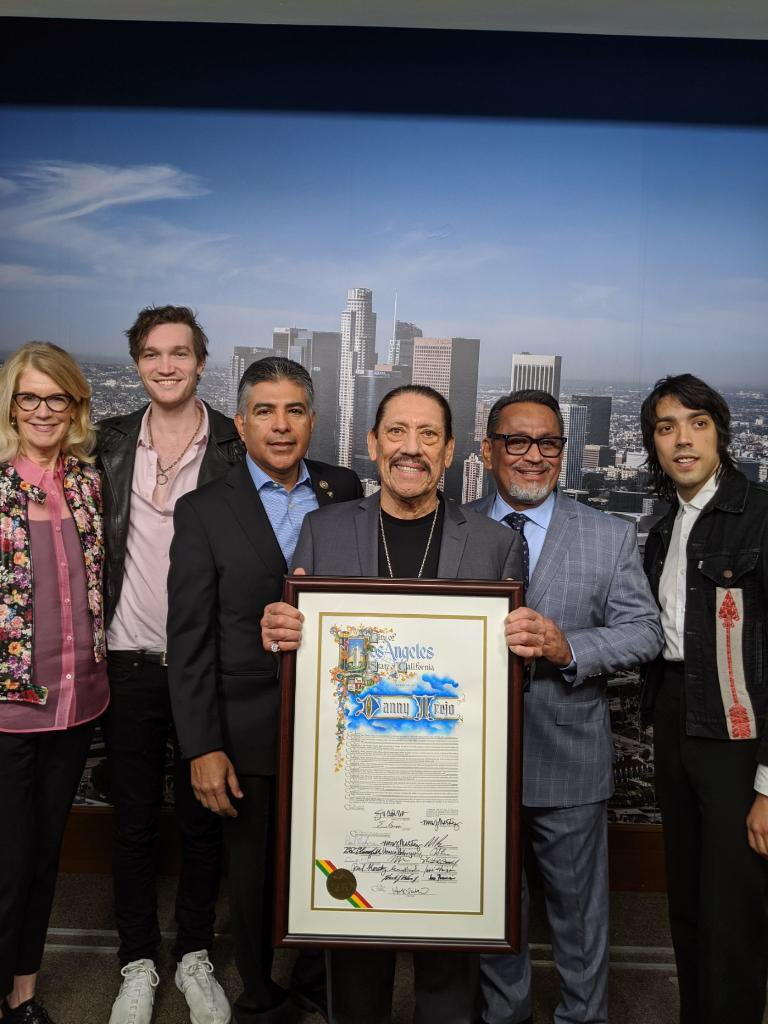
Cedillo with Representative Tony Cárdenas and actor Danny Trejo in 2020.

=== Elections ===
==== 2013 ====
Because of term limits, Cedillo could not run for reelection to the California State Legislature in 2012. He ran for a seat on the Los Angeles City Council representing Council District 1 and was elected in 2013.

==== 2017 ====
Gil Cedillo ran for reelection in Council District 1 in Los Angeles. As a 2016 Bernie Sanders delegate, he was backed by Our Revolution. His opponents were Jesse Rosas, Giovany Hernandez, and Joe Bray-Ali. In the primary election Cedillo won 49.4 percent, missing the threshold to avoid a runoff election. Challenger Joe Bray-Ali drew 38 percent, more than any other challenger, and was able to face Cedillo in the runoff. Cedillo defeated Bray-Ali in the runoff with over 70% of the voters in Council District 1 on May 16, 2017.

==== 2022 ====
Cedillo secured an endorsement from Bernie Sanders for his 2022 reelection race. However, he lost to political newcomer, Eunisses Hernandez.

=== Tenure ===
In December 2013, Cedillo authored a Los Angeles City Council resolution urging President Obama to halt most deportations and to expand the Deferred Action for Childhood Arrivals (DACA) program to "all immigrant families who are not engaged in criminal activity."

In May 2017 Cedillo authored a motion requiring companies to disclose whether they were involved with the construction of the U.S.-Mexico border wall promised by President Donald Trump before being able to work with the City of Los Angeles.

=== 2022 audio recording scandal ===
In October 2022, Cedillo faced calls to resign after attending a secretly recorded meeting where fellow Council member Kevin de León, Council president Nury Martinez, and Los Angeles County Federation of Labor President Ron Herrera had made racist remarks was released anonymously on Reddit.

California Assembly
Preceded by Louis Caldera	Member of the California Assembly from the 46th district 1998–2002	Succeeded by Fabian Núñez
Preceded by Kevin de León	Member of the California Assembly from the 45th district 2010–2012	Succeeded by Bob Blumenfield
California Senate
Preceded by Richard Polanco	Member of the California Senate from the 22nd district 2002–2010	Succeeded by Kevin de León
Political offices
Preceded by Ed Reyes	Member of the Los Angeles City Council from the 1st district 2013–present	Succeeded by Eunisses Hernandez
