= Jane McAlevey =

American labor organizer and author (1964–2024)

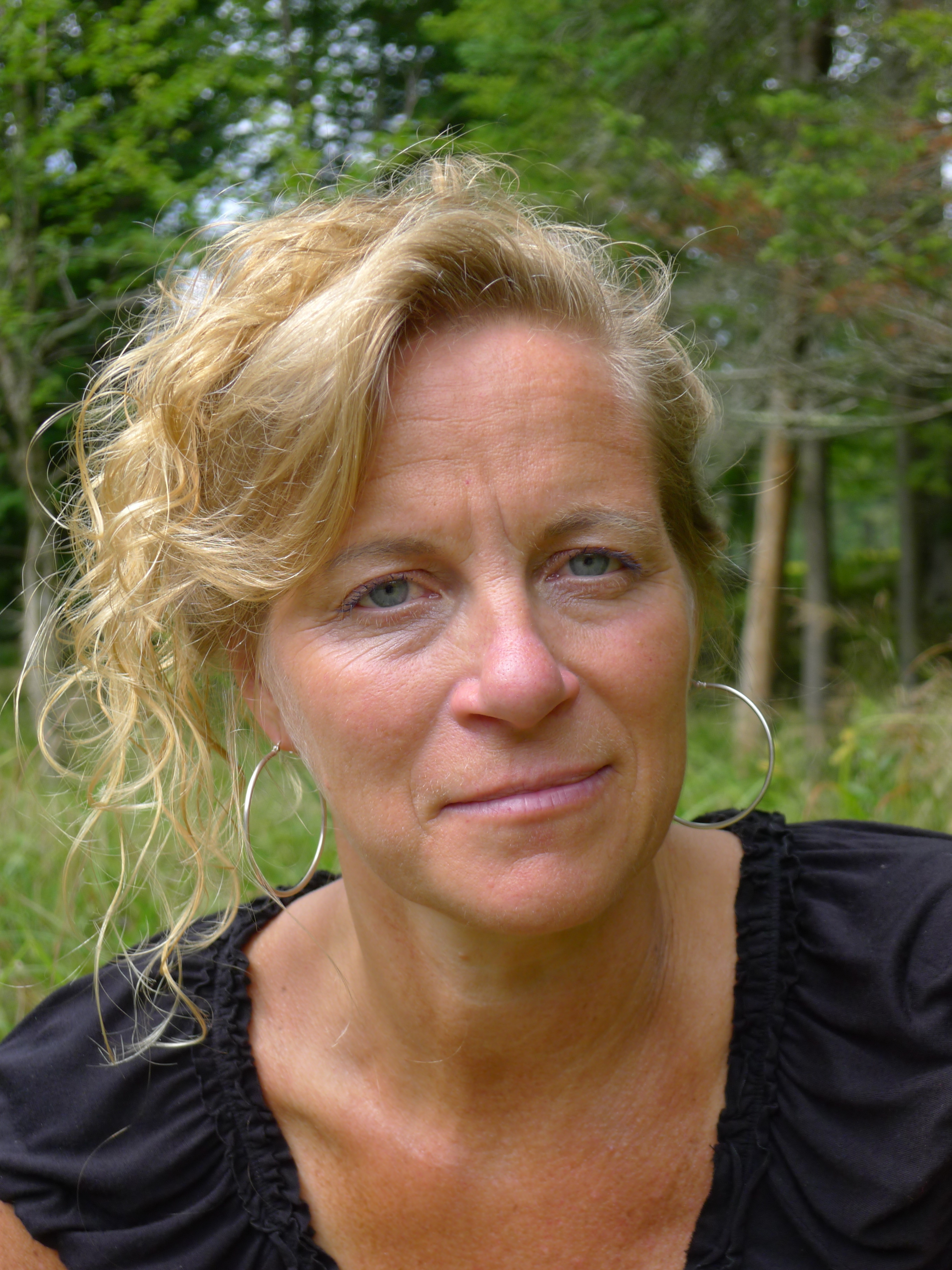
- McAlevey in 2014
- Born: October 12, 1964; New York City, New York, U.S.
- Died: July 7, 2024 (aged 59); Muir Beach, California, U.S.
- Education: State University of New York, Buffalo (BA); Graduate Center, CUNY (MA, PhD)
- Occupations: Union, environmental and community organizer, scholar, author, political commentator
- Years active: 1984–2024
- Website: Official website

Jane F. McAlevey (October 12, 1964 – July 7, 2024) was an American union organizer, author, and political commentator. She was a Senior Policy Fellow at the University of California, Berkeley's Institute for Research on Labor and Employment, and a columnist at The Nation.

McAlevey contended that only workers have the power, through organization, to force significant change in the workplace and in society at large. Her model, what she called whole-worker organizing, sees workers and the community they live in as a whole. The underlying theory of change requires a systematic, grassroots mass organization of workers.

McAlevey wrote four books about organizing and the essential role of workers and trade unions in reversing income inequality and building a stronger democracy: Raising Expectations and Raising Hell (2012), No Shortcuts: Organizing for Power in the New Gilded Age (2016), A Collective Bargain: Unions, Organizing, and the Fight for Democracy (2020), and with Abby Lawlor, Rules to Win By: Power and Participation in Union Negotiations (2023).

== Early life ==
Born in Manhattan, McAlevey was the youngest of nine children. Her father, John McAlevey, a World War II fighter pilot, lawyer, and progressive politician, was mayor of Sloatsburg, New York, then Supervisor of Ramapo, and member of the Rockland County Board of Supervisors. As a baby, her parents took her to civil rights and anti-Vietnam War marches. When she was 5, her mother died of BRCA1-related breast cancer, and her father began taking her to work with him. He advocated for open-space zoning and public housing, which led to her harassment in school: ''You'd go to school and get screamed at irrationally by the parents of other kids because 'your father is going to bring black people to Rockland County.' It was good to get taught principles early, to look in the face of fear a little bit and not look back," she recalls. She began attending anti-nuclear protests on her own at age 13. In high school, she organized a successful student walkout, protesting against sexist female gym uniform requirements.

== Education ==
In 1984, while attending the State University of New York at Buffalo, McAlevey was elected student body president. She went on to be elected president of the Student Association of the State University of New York (SASU), the 200,000-member statewide student union in New York's public university system. As president, she also assumed the sole student representative position as a voting member of the board of trustees of the State University of New York (SUNY). There, she orchestrated a student occupation of the SUNY headquarters building to protest the university's investments in South Africa. McAlevey was one of the "SUNY 6" organizers arrested for trespass; she and two others accepted 15-day sentences and went to prison rather than agree to refrain from protesting during a probationary period. Four days after their release and announcement of further protests, the SUNY trustees voted to divest the university system from entities doing business in South Africa; it was the largest single act of divestiture in the United States at that time.

McAlevey left the State University of New York at Buffalo before completing her undergraduate degree. In 2010, at the urging of Frances Fox Piven, McAlevey returned to university to pursue a PhD. In 2015, she earned a doctorate in sociology at the Graduate Center, City University of New York (CUNY), under the supervision of Piven and advised by James Jasper and Dan Clawson. She then completed a two-year postdoctoral fellowship in the Labor & Worklife Program at Harvard Law School (2015–2017).

== Career ==
In 1985, on leaving university, McAlevey traveled to Moscow as an invited guest of the Komsomol for the 12th World Festival of Youth and Students. She was among 27,000 attendees from 157 countries. She recalls receiving "a thousand years of education about exploitation and colonialism ... spending day after day meeting Cubans, Latin Americans, people from all over the African continent." According to McAlevey, Soviet officials extended her visit with a tour of Belarus and repeatedly delayed her flight home while offering her graduate education in Moscow. She returned disillusioned with the Soviet system.

McAlevey then traveled through Central America, spending time in Nicaragua working to support the revolution led by the Sandinista National Liberation Front. She then moved to California to work out of David Brower's Earth Island Institute on a project aimed at educating the environmental movement in the US about the ecological consequences of US military and economic policy in Central America. She served as co-director of EPOCA, the Environmental Project on Central America. After working on coalition building in the US and in the international environmental movement for two years, she was recruited by John Gaventa to work at the Highlander Research and Education Center in New Market, Tennessee, where she served as an educator and as Deputy Director.

=== Work for labor unions ===
After the insurgent, change-oriented "New Voice" leadership came to power at the American Federation of Labor and Congress of Industrial Organizations (AFL-CIO) in 1995, McAlevey was recruited by senior AFL-CIO leaders to work for their organizing department and head up an experimental multi-union campaign in Stamford, Connecticut. From 1997 to 2001, she ran the Stamford Organizing Project, an unconventional approach built around a multi-union partnership–a rarity–and extensive community involvement. It was her first foray into union organizing, where she developed a model for what she called "whole-worker" organizing, bringing together union members and community with the view that they were not two separate groups.

From the AFL-CIO, McAlevey became the national Deputy Director for Strategic Campaigns of the Health Care Division of the Service Employees International Union (SEIU), from 2002 to 2004. In 2004, she was appointed Executive Director and Chief Negotiator for SEIU Nevada, a state-based union that went on to success in achieving employer-paid family healthcare, preventing the rollback of public pensions, and using an approach to contract negotiations that gives workers the right to sit in on their workplace negotiations.

=== Scholarly work and consulting ===
In 2009, McAlevey was diagnosed with cancer and forced to take a break from her work to undergo treatment. While bedridden, she began writing a memoir of her years in labor organizing, which eventually became her first book, Raising Expectations and Raising Hell (Verso Books, 2012), named by Nation magazine as the “most valuable book of 2012”. After a year of treatment, she returned to university to pursue a PhD. Her doctoral dissertation became her second book, No Shortcuts (Oxford University Press, 2016).

Her studies completed, McAlevey returned to labor organizing, and continued to write, producing two more books, A Collective Bargain (Ecco Press, 2020), and Rules to Win By with Abby Lawlor (Oxford University Press, 2023).

McAlevey, an engaging speaker, reached global audiences when, starting in 2019, she led an intensive six-week online course, Organizing for Power (O4P), at the Berlin-based Rosa Luxemburg Foundation, a democratic socialist policy nonprofit. Over four years, over 40 thousand people in over 100 countries logged onto the workshops, which were translated into 19 languages.

In 2019, McAlevey was named Senior Policy Fellow at the University of California, Berkeley's Institute for Research on Labor and Employment. Also that year, she was named Strikes correspondent at The Nation; in 2023, she became a columnist for the magazine. She alternated between organizing and writing.

== Whole-worker organizing ==
McAlevey's whole-worker organizing model views workers and the community they live in as a whole: workers are part of the community, and community members engage in work. In her doctoral thesis, later adapted as her second book, she argued: "the terrain of success for ordinary people in the twenty-first century is located in their ability to forge equally deep solidarities in, outside, and between the workplace and the community." The underlying theory of change requires a systematic, grassroots mass organization of workers, integrating their strong community connections, including family, religious groups, sports teams, and other community associations. She explained, “What almost no union does is actually organize their members as members in their own communities to build community power. I teach workers to take over their unions and change them."

The whole-worker model draws from the Congress of Industrial Organizations approach from the 1930s, where all workers, skilled and unskilled, were organized together, with power coming from sheer numbers. The central organizing objective is to achieve a supermajority of worker support, usually set at 90%, before taking collective action. Organizing involves several key elements. Power-structure analysis is a research-intensive charting of the strengths and weaknesses of the union members, community allies, and the employer. Organic leader identification is a method of locating and recruiting those workers who command widespread respect from their coworkers, distinguished from the most outspoken and activist workers. Structure tests are a series of escalating public actions as proof of solidarity. "Big, open bargaining" is the practice of open contract negotiations, with the membership attending as observers. The model is based on in-person, face-to-face communication, rather than email and social networking.

Central to the approach is the labor-intensive task of having one-on-one conversations with each constituent. Organizers' main activity is listening, in order to identify people's most pressing issues, and introducing specific questions that lead to "the hard question," asking the individual to choose between enduring the problems alone or joining in collective action. A strike in this whole-worker model requires sustained action by an overwhelming majority of workers to put maximum pressure on management.

== Public debate ==
McAlevey was active in the public sphere, in American and international media. She contended that only workers have the power, through organization, to force significant change in the workplace and in society at large. She advocated for a complete restructuring of how a majority of labor unions today operate, including their approaches to leadership development, bargaining, allocation of resources, and relationship to politics.

Commenting on the current state of social movement organizations in general, McAlevey found an overreliance on people who are already in agreement with a cause. She describes the three common approaches to change as advocacy, mobilization, and organization. Advocacy relies on experts, lawyers, and lobbyists, usually funded through donations, to promote a cause. Mobilization, which McAlevey calls "shallow organizing", seeks to motivate like-minded people to act on their belief through actions such as demonstrations or voting. Organization, the hardest task, engages with whole populations, including those who have opposing opinions or have yet to form one, seeking to expand membership for future mobilization. According to McAlevey, the reliance on advocacy and mobilization by today's unions and social movement groups is "the main reason why modern movements have not replicated the kinds of gains achieved by earlier labor and civil rights movements."

== Personal life ==
In 2009, McAlevey was diagnosed with early-stage ovarian cancer while being tested for the hereditary BRCA1 gene mutation. She underwent a year of intensive treatment. Her mother had died of BRCA1-related cancer, and her older sister, Catherine, had been diagnosed with breast cancer and tested positive for the BRCA1 mutation.

On April 14, 2024, McAlevey announced on her website that she had entered home hospice care the week before, a result of a multiple myeloma cancer diagnosed in the fall of 2021. On April 23, during an interview on Democracy Now! discussing the United Auto Workers unionization win at the Volkswagen plant in Tennessee, McAlevey stated that she had exhausted conventional treatment and clinical trial drugs: "They thought I would be dead a few weeks ago. I'm out again. I'm riding my bike. I'm on your show. And I'm going to fight until the last dying minute, because that's what American workers deserve."

McAlevey died from multiple myeloma on July 7, 2024, at the age of 59, at her cabin in Muir Beach, California.

Writing in The Nation after McAlevey's death, journalist, academic and organizer Eleni Schirmer described "Jane’s hallmark style: big, bulging goals and a basketball-like execution plan—the precision of a thousand tiny repetitions; inviting people to touch their power, then watching them grab it for their own; the grinning, sweaty devotion to the team; the rapture of winning."

== Bibliography ==
=== Books ===
- McAlevey, Jane; Ostertag, Bob (2012). Raising Expectations (and Raising Hell): My Decade Fighting for the Labor Movement. Verso Books. ISBN 9781844679225.
- McAlevey, Jane (2016). No Shortcuts: Organizing for Power in the New Gilded Age. Oxford University Press. ISBN 9780190624712.
- McAlevey, Jane (2021). A Collective Bargain: Unions, Organizing, and the Fight for Democracy. New York, NY: Ecco Press. ISBN 978-0-06-290859-9.
- McAlevey, Jane; Lawlor, Abby (2023). Rules to win by: power and participation in union negotiations. New York, NY: Oxford University Press. ISBN 978-0-19-769046-8.

=== Referenced articles ===
- McAlevey, Jane (2018). "The Strike as the Ultimate Structure Test". Catalyst: A Journal of Theory and Strategy. 2 (3): 122–135.
- McAlevey, Jane (September 2015). "The Crisis of New Labor and Alinsky's Legacy: Revisiting the Role of the Organic Grassroots Leaders in Building Powerful Organizations and Movements". Politics & Society. 43 (3): 415–441. doi:10.1177/0032329215584767.
- McAlevey, Jane (2003). "It Takes a Community: Building Unions from the Outside In". New Labor Forum. 12 (1): 23–32.
