= Community unionism =

Formation of alliances between unions and non-labour groups

Community unionism, also known as reciprocal unionism, refers to the formation of alliances between unions and non-labour groups in order to achieve common goals. These unions seek to organize the employed, unemployed, and underemployed. They press for change in the workplace and beyond, organizing around issues such as welfare reform, health care, jobs, housing, and immigration. Individual issues at work are seen as being a part of broader societal problems which they seek to address. Unlike trade unions, community union membership is not based on the workplace- it is based on common identities and issues. Alliances forged between unions and other groups may have a primary identity based on affiliations of religion, ethnic group, gender, disability, environmentalism, neighborhood residence, or sexuality.

Community unionism has many definitions and practices. It varies according to country, institutional and political contexts, internal organization, leadership, scale, organizing style, sources of funding, and communication structure. In all, there is no "universal" community union; they take on many different forms. In order to simplify the complex structures of community unions, four categories have been established (although in practice community unions may blur the boundaries of these classifications):

- Community organization/ no union partner: This consists of community based efforts to organize around workplaces. It may also include new initiatives created by already established community organizations.
- Labour union(s)/ no community partner: This category is composed of new union locals or new initiatives undertaken as part of a labour union organizing strategy. These organizations seek the support of community institutions but do not form a joint effort with them.
- Community/labour partnership but with community organization dominant: This organization is based on mutual self-interest. Unions and community work together to improve conditions in the labour market through economic and political action. In these partnerships, community leadership dominates the practice of the organization.
- Community/labour partnership but with labour union dominant: This organization differs from the one previously mentioned in that union leadership dominates the practice of the organization.

A part of the discourse of why community unionism has many definitions is in the ambiguity of the word "community" itself. In "Coalitions and Community Unionism", Tattersall breaks the word "community" into three elements which may help in understanding community unions better: as organizations, common interest and identity, and place.

== Goals of community unions ==
Community union initiatives aim to achieve a number of things:

- Seek to build community power.
- By increasing scale of organizing activity, they can deal with questions of economic justice beyond particular work places.
- By working with community groups, unions are able to reach workers in traditionally non-union environments.
- They can enable unions to help organize fragmented workforces split across large numbers of small workplaces.
- Establishing extensive links into the local community may help unions defend terms and conditions within their traditional workplaces.

== History of community unionism ==
In Community Unionism A Comparative Analysis of Concepts and contexts, McBride and Greenwood note that community unions are not a new idea: it is an old form of unionism that dates back 150 years. They point out that in the early period of trade union formation, UK unions were organized within local communities where factories and heavy industry were geographically established. They find that this community/union relationship was broken with the changing geographies of employment and industrial restructuring. With this change, stable communities were destroyed that were located around the docks, mines, mills, and other regions of heavy industry. Supporting this idea, Hess also agrees that community factors have always been a part of unionism in "Community as a Factor in Union Organization".

Black establishes that the term "community unionism" was first used in the 1960s in his article "Community Unionism: A Strategy for Organizing in the New Economy". He states that James O’Connar used the term in 1964: he believed that in the future, communities would become central to working class organization because of the instability of workplaces. Jones envisioned that future employment would be deskilled and insecure, and because of this, the workplace would no longer be appropriate for organization. He anticipated that community unions would be established in de-industrialized towns, and urban slums. He also believed that community unions would work to improve housing, welfare, and public services.

As well, Black points out that the notion of community unionism was also used by organizers within the United Auto Workers (UAW) labour union in the 1960s. An organizer by the name of Jack Conway envisioned a new form of unionism that would develop. Conway too, believed that "community" would take over the central role of the factory in organizing workers in trade unionism. He came to believe this by looking at the Farm Workers Union (FWU). He noticed that the issues that farmers were facing went beyond the workplace. Conway concluded that the new form of unions would focus on grievances, political education, and community organization.

In "Community Unions in Canada and Labor’s (Re)Organization of Space", Tufts also explains how a labour leader of the UAW, Walter Reuther, envisioned a new form of unionism. Reuther believed that the labour movement should be more of a "social movement" as opposed to solely an "economic movement".

Tattersall points out, in her article "Coalitions and Community Unionism:Using the Term Community to Explore Effective Union-Community Collaborations", that "community unions" were also created by the Students for a Democratic Society (SDS) in the United States in the 1960s. These community unions were community based, worker organizations. Tattersall also notes that along with the UAW, the Civil Rights Movement in the 1960s also used the term "community unionism". Here, the term was used to describe community organizations that sought to organize the urban working poor in the United States.

Although the notion of community unionism was being put into practice in certain areas, it was not widely accepted by majority of people, and business unionism dominated. It was not until the 1990s that the practice of community unions increased.

== The rise of community unions ==
The 1970s and 1980s witnessed profound restructuring of labour markets. Neoliberal policies that emerged in the 1970s were adopted by many governments around the world, and included measures such as deregulation and privatization. These policies created insecurity in employment by breaking down institutional regulatory and political support for unions. Traditional unions experienced a loss of power, influence, and members. During this period of economic restructuring, communities were forced to form coalitions with the labour movement to fight factory closures and relocations that were the basis of many local economies. Community unionism can be understood as a response to neoliberalism and globalization: it was a turn back to the local level- or community- in organizing. It seeks to organize some of the most vulnerable people- immigrants, women, and people of colour- who have been disproportionately affected by the growth of exploitative working conditions in the neoliberal economy.

== Community unions in Japan ==
Community unions were formed in Japan in the early 1980s. They emerged spontaneously from grassroots organizations and from labour councils (although labour councils account for a larger number of organizing activities). Labour councils that supported community unions were affiliated with Sohyo: a left leaning union confederation. These labour councils were in charge of different regions and directly represented workers by forming community unions. Labour councils held relative autonomy from the larger national confederation. They were able to achieve this because they maintained their own finances and staff. Thus, community unions were dependent on labour councils for resources that supported these organizations. Because workers with part-time employment were excluded from union membership at those firms, labour councils sought to represent people with part-time employment and people who worked in small firms in a given region. Councils found these workers through "labour problem hotlines". Because of their independence from the larger confederation, organizing activities varied with each labour council.

The range of activities among these labour councils included:

- organizing regional level rallies and demonstrations.
- engaging in electoral campaigns during local and national elections.
- making policy requests to local governments.
- giving support to member unions when they were in a labour dispute.
- promoting unionization of un-unionized workers.
- getting involved in social movements at the regional level workers.

In 1989, Sohyo was replaced with a formation of a new confederation: Rengo. This restructuring impacted the relationship that labour councils had with community unions: labour councils would no longer organize workers; they were now a part of Rengo's Regional Organizations. These Regional Organizations do not have the freedom and activities that labour councils once had and do not support community unions thus some community unions broke up during this time. Community unions that remained faced challenges dealing with finances and autonomy workers.

Japanese community unions function differently from US, Canadian, Australian, and UK community unions: their membership turnover is high, and membership rates are low. They are substantially smaller, have a weak financial base-requiring members to donate- and have high rank and file participation. These community unions take the form of a specific organizational model: Community Organization/No Union Partner. This framework of community unionism resembles US and Canadian Worker Centers but in practice is quite different. In addition, Japanese community unions do not tend to reflect coalition building like US, Canada, Australia, and UK. This can be explained by Japan's lack of community-based organizations able to form alliances with community unions, and that Japanese community unions pursue individual issues opposed to broader range of issues that affect livelihoods of many people. Most issues that community unions deal with are: disputes over dismissals, working hours and leave, harassment, demotion or reduction in wages, discrimination, and working conditions. Community unions try to negotiate a settlement for the workers complaint and if it falls through, then are redirected to government labour committees or courts. Once a community union wins a case for a worker, the worker usually gives a part of his/her compensation back to the community union, and then resigns.

== Community unions in the US ==
Like other advanced industrial economies, community unionism sprang up in the US in the 1980s. Community unions were formed from community and faith-based organizing networks, Central American solidarity movements and other left wing organizations, legal services and social service agencies, immigrant non-governmental organizations, churches, and labour unions. US community unions focus on issues that go beyond the workplace such as housing, health care, education, and immigration.

Craft unionism in the US organized workers based on their trade by class or skill. The jobs these workers had were stable, paid a living wage, provided pensions, and offered long-term employment. Within the last 20 years, the highly competitive and mobile nature of US firms has resulted in outsourcing and subcontracting practices. These widespread practices have negative impacts on workers: lower wages, little/no access to benefits, decreased hours, and no pension. Not only are unions being dismantled by neoliberal policies, but the precarious work that has risen out of the US economy no longer identifies with craft union practices as low wage workers are facing different challenges. In addition, many jobs that are coming to characterize the US economy are non-unionized. Community unionism has been a response to these issues in the US, and has provided activities at a local level that work to set up labour market protections for low wage workers. They accomplish this by organizing members and allies in bringing pressure on elected officials to support them. Thus, US community unions rely on politics and public policy in creating change for members (wages, hours, working conditions). Community union membership may be based on ethnic, racial, religious affiliations and geographic areas.

US community unions vary in their organizational framework. They reflect the four structures of community unions. For example:

Community organization/ no union partner: Worker centers fall into this category.

Labour Union or unions/ no community partner: SEIU's National Justice for Janitors & CHOP Chicago Homecare Organizing Project.

Community/ labour partnership but with community organization dominant: Partnership of Industrial Areas Foundation (IAF) and the American Federation of State, County, and Municipal Employers (AFSCME) in Baltimore & The Partnership of Industrial Areas Foundation (IAF) and the United Food and Commercial Workers (UFCW) in Omaha.

Community/labour partnership but with labour union dominant: The Stamford Organizing Project of the AFL-CIO.

== Challenges in community unions ==
In "Community Unionism: A Strategy for Organizing in the New Economy", Black highlights that community organizations can be territorial. This can lead to conflict when two separate groups try to organize the same community. Black also points out that conflict may also arise over what the focus of their organizing will be based on. Disagreement on the specific goals of the organization can take the form of short-term and long-term goals. Black also finds that there can be conflict on the internal structure of a community union (specifically, equal participation in the organization).

In "Community Unions in Japan: Similarities Differences of Region Based Labour Movements between Japan and Other Industrialized Countries", Suzuki finds that challenges arise because of the different ways of looking at community unions: community unions may not fall into a specific category and may bridge different elements of coalition building and social movements. For Suzuki, there may be difficulty in forming equal partnerships between unions and organizations, and workers and the unemployed.

In Community Unionism A Comparative Analysis of Concepts and Contexts, McBride and Greenwood believe that traditional unions may have problems in giving up their power and control when forming alliances with community organizations. Traditional unions are structured hierarchically and operate differently from community organizations which may cause problems. McBride and Greenwood also found that there are no accessible spaces for communities to form relationships with trade unions. They found that these alliances are formed through formal meetings. This can be a problematic for expanding links into communities as it is a very narrow way of establishing relationships.

== See also ==
- Social Movement Unionism
- Organising model of trade unionism
- Jobs with Justice
