= Institute of Industrial Relations =

Institute of Industrial Relations or Institute for Industrial Relations may refer to:

- China Institute of Industrial Relations in Beijing
- Institute for Industrial Relations of the Haas School of Business at the University of California, Berkeley, now the UC-Berkeley Institute for Research on Labor and Employment
- Institute of Industrial Relations of the University of California, Los Angeles, now the UCLA Institute for Research on Labor and Employment
- Institute of Industrial Relations of the University of the Philippines Diliman in Quezon City, Metro Manila, now the University of the Philippines School of Labor and Industrial Relations
- UIUC Institute of Labor and Industrial Relations of the University of Illinois at Urbana-Champaign
