= No Shortcuts =

Book by Jane McAlevey

No Shortcuts: Organizing for Power in the New Gilded Age
- 1st edition cover
- Author: Jane McAlevey
- Language: English
- Genre: Non-fiction
- Publisher: Oxford University Press
- Publication date: October 11, 2016
- Publication place: United States
- Pages: 272
- ISBN: 9780190624712

No Shortcuts: Organizing for Power in the New Gilded Age (ISBN 1586480499) is a 2016 non-fiction book by Jane McAlevey, in which the author argues that meaningful social change can only happen when organizing is built around workers and ordinary people at the community level. The book uses case studies from the labor unions and social movements.

German edition book cover

A German edition was published by VSA: Verlag, a division of Springer Science+Business Media, in February 2019.

== Overview ==
Chapters include "The Power to Win is in the Community, Not the Boardroom," "Nursing Home Unions: Class Snuggle vs. Class Struggle," "Chicago Teachers: Building a Resilient Union," "Smithfield Foods: A Huge Success You've Hardly Heard About," and "Make the Road New York." As she dissects each case, she identifies the reasons for the movement's success or failure.

== Reception ==
The book received positive reviews from Dayna Tortorici, and Sam Gindin.
