= Delbert E. Wong =

American judge

Delbert Earl Wong
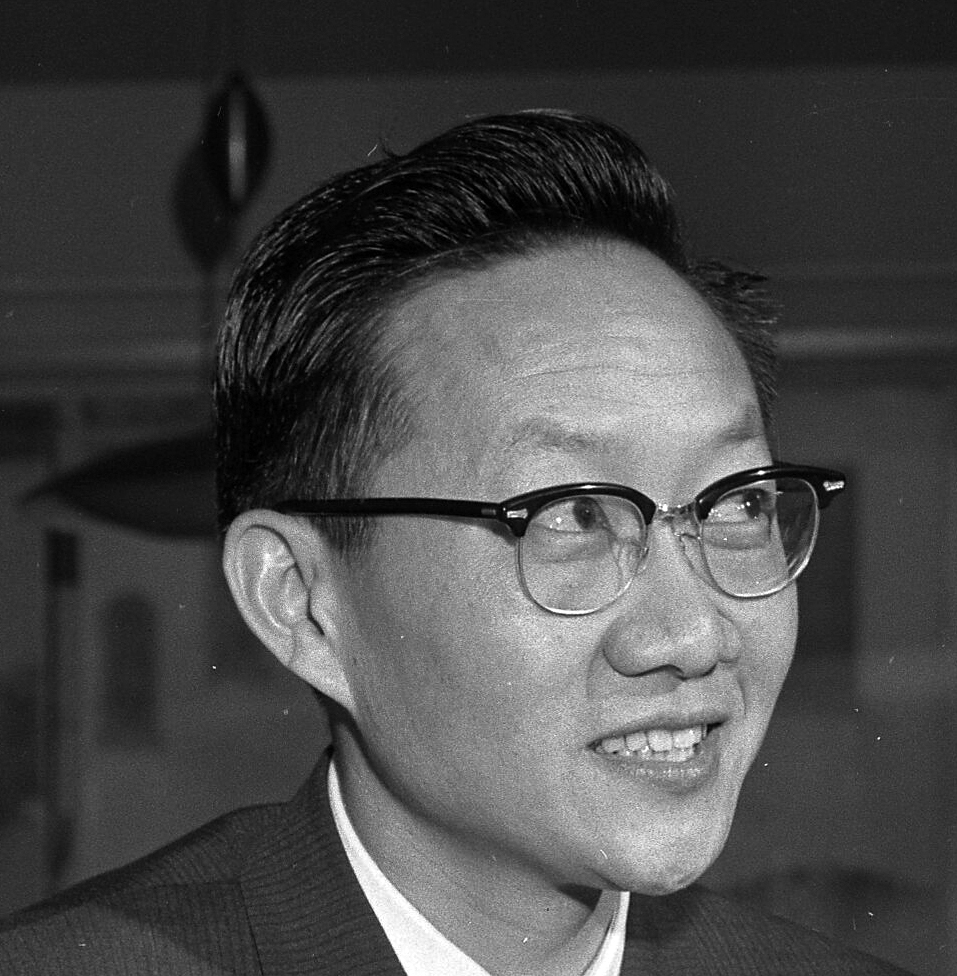
- Wong in 1959

Los Angeles County Superior Court Judge

Personal details
- Born: May 17, 1920 Hanford, California
- Died: March 10, 2006 (aged 85)
- Spouse: Dolores Wong
- Education: Berkeley

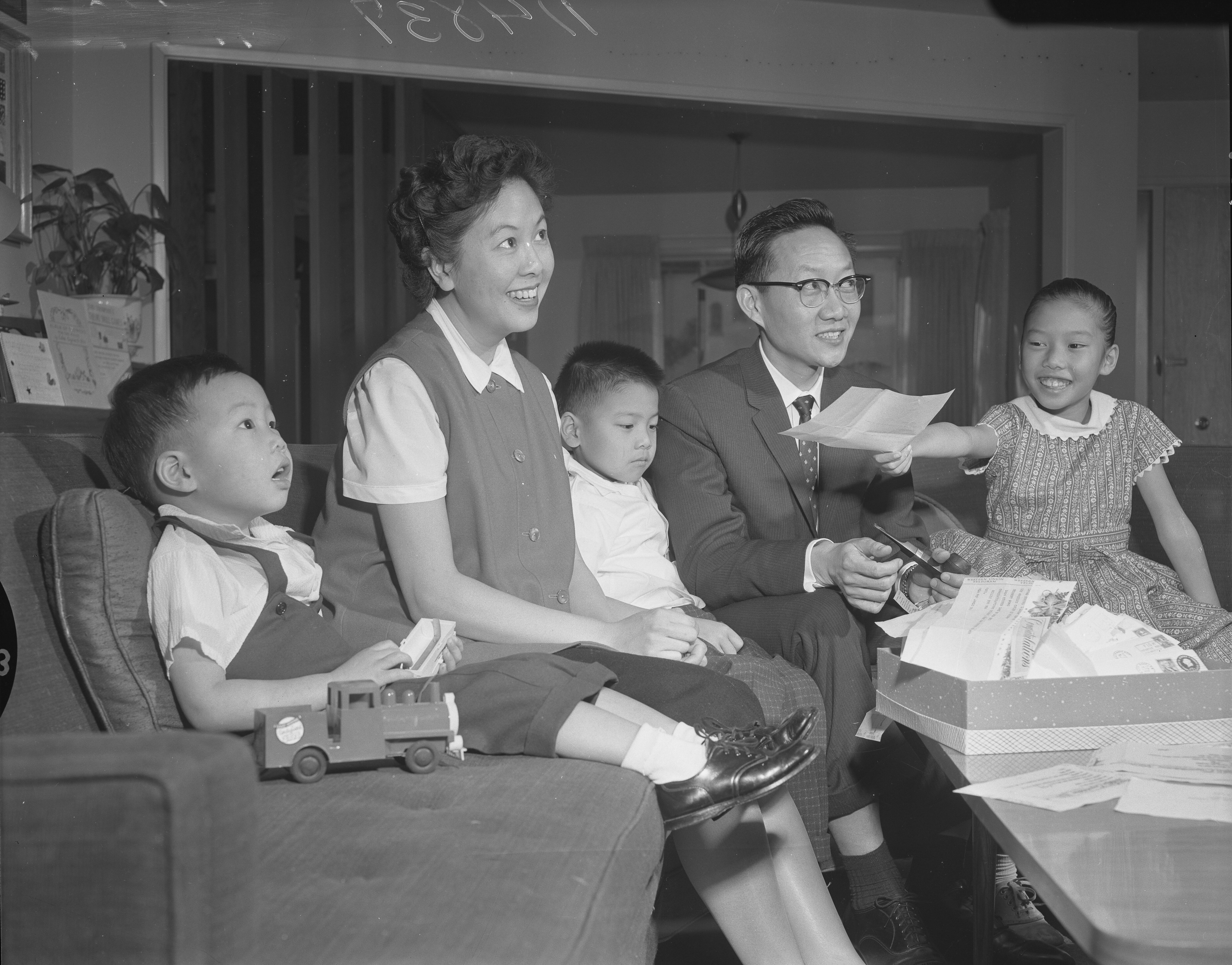
Delbert E. Wong reads congratulatory messages to his family upon becoming a newly appointed municipal judge. From left are Kent, 2, Mrs. Dolores Wong, Duane, 6, Shelley, 8.

Delbert Wong (Chinese: 黃錦紹, May 17, 1920 – March 10, 2006) was the first judge in the continental United States of Chinese descent.

== Early life and education ==
Delbert Wong was born in Hanford, California on May 17, 1920, and raised a short distance away in Bakersfield. After obtaining an Associate of Arts degree from Bakersfield College, he transferred to the University of California, Berkeley, where he would earn a B.S. in business in 1942. While attending UC Berkeley, he was a brother of Pi Alpha Phi, an Asian-American Interest fraternity. Wong met his wife, Dolores (née Wing), at Berkeley; she graduated from there in 1943 and earned a master's degree from Smith College.

After he graduated from Berkeley, Wong joined the United States Army Air Forces during World War II, and became one of eighteen B-17 Flying Fortress navigators that graduated in his class at Mather Field in Sacramento. During his service with the military, he was one of only three navigators who completed their thirty bombing missions. For his bravery and dedication, First Lieutenant Delbert Wong was awarded the Distinguished Flying Cross, as well as four Air Medals.

In 1948, Wong became the first Chinese American graduate of Stanford Law School. After his graduation, Delbert continued to break new ground. He was the first Asian American to be appointed Deputy Legislative Counsel serving the California State Legislature, and the first Asian American to be appointed a Deputy State Attorney General in 1952.

== Career ==
During his tenure as a Deputy State Attorney General, Wong was appointed by then-Governor Pat Brown to the Municipal Court of the Los Angeles Judicial District in 1959, making him the first Chinese American named to the bench in the continental United States. Two years later, Judge Wong was elevated to the Los Angeles County Superior Court, where he served for over 20 years. Despite his busy schedule as a Municipal Court Judge, Wong served as Cubmaster of Cub Scout Pack 527 of the Hollywood Wilshire Council of the Boy Scouts of America. One of his Cub Scouts was Lance Ito, later to become trial judge in the infamous O. J. Simpson murder case. Ito appointed then-retired Judge Wong to serve as a special master to retrieve a switchblade knife from the Simpson residence that had been missed by police detectives.

Even after he retired from the bench in 1982, he continued to be involved in his community. Wong researched and reported on racial issues within the Los Angeles Airport Police Bureau at the request of the Los Angeles Department of Airports; was appointed by then-Mayor of Los Angeles Tom Bradley to serve on a panel tasked with drafting an ethics policy for the City of Los Angeles; and was appointed Chair of the Asian Pacific American Focus Program of the National Conference of Christians and Jews to combat the rise in violence against Asian Americans.

After his formal retirement, Wong served as a senior judge on the Los Angeles Superior Court. He also served as a Justice pro tem of the California Court of Appeal, Second Appellate District, in 1980. In retirement, he acted as a discovery referee and private mediator, handling a number of high-profile matters.

Together with his wife, Dolores, Judge Wong was also an ardent supporter of the Chinese American community, making significant contributions to the Asian Pacific American Legal Center, the Chinatown Service Center and the Asian Pacific American Friends of the Center Theater Group.

== Personal life and legacy ==
In 1954, Wong became the first minority resident of the Silver Lake neighborhood of Los Angeles, California; the real estate agent refused to work with the Wongs until he was threatened with termination by the property owner. Wong's home was designed by architect Gilbert Leong.

Wong and wife Dolores had four children: Kent, Shelley, Duane, and Marshall.

On March 10, 2006, Wong died. He was 85 years old. On November 23, 2014, Wong's wife Dolores died in her sleep. She was 93 years old. A square in Los Angeles Chinatown was dedicated to Judge Wong in 2013; it is at the intersection of Ord and North Hill, and is the first time the City of Los Angeles recognized a Chinese-American with an official landmark. A similar motion to dedicate a public square for his wife Dolores was advanced in June 2021.

== See also ==
- List of Asian American jurists
