= Paul A. Dodd =

American economist

Paul A. Dodd, c.1947

Paul Albert Dodd (July 26, 1902 – August 22, 1992) was an American educator, economist, and labor arbitrator. He served as professor of economics at the University of California, Los Angeles from 1928 to 1962, and was appointed as the first director of the Institute of Industrial Relations from 1945 to 1947 at UCLA, before specializing as an educational administrator.

Dodd was revered among the leading economists of his time, which allowed him the opportunity to serve on multiple educational, state, and federal committees involving community and economic impact. Moreover, as a leading university administrator, he served in various roles of university administration including posts as dean and acting-vice chancellor of UCLA, and later serving as university president of San Francisco State College in the mid-1960s, until his retirement.

== Personal life and education ==
Born on July 26, 1902, in Greenwood, Missouri to William and Eva Violet Dodd, Paul spent his childhood and adolescence in communities across the U.S. Midwest, spending portions of his youth in the states of Oklahoma, Kansas and Missouri, following the career and ministry of his father who served as a Presbyterian Minister.

Dodd received his A.B. from Park College in 1924 and later earned a Ph.D. in economics from the University of Pennsylvania in 1933. He was also awarded an honorary LL.D. from Park College in 1950. While pursuing his graduate work, he married in Pennsylvania in 1928 and soon began his family as he moved to California.

== Career ==
Upon arriving at UCLA in 1928, Dodd worked as a consultant prior to the completion of his graduate work. After completion of his Ph.D. dissertation, Dodd joined the UCLA faculty in the department of economics, where he worked closely with Gordon Watkins, a leading scholar in industrial relations. Dodd is said to have "rose to prominence in the 1930s as Watkins' protégé", who together began to compile publications regarding industrial relations.

"He first drew public attention in the mid-1930s where he served as a federal labor arbitrator in disputes involving warehouse owners and longshoremen and a Teamsters' blockade of Los Angeles Harbor.". In conjunction, he served as a member on the National War Labor Board during World War II,"charged with negotiating wage and price settlements". Dodd also served as chairman of the President's Emergency Railway Labor Board and as a member on the Governor's Committee on Health Insurance (CA, 1939–40) as he was known for early research on health insurance and health costs in California.

"After World War II, Dodd helped establish many new educational and research programs at UCLA, including schools of medicine, nursing, law, dentistry, fine arts and librarianship." During this same period, California Governor Earl Warren established two units of industrial relations for the University of California in the midst of rising U.S. political power and global influence. Selected to be the founding director of the UCLA Institute of Industrial Relations, Dodd used his post to lay the ground work for continued conversation and research concerning university and national dialogue regarding employment and labor issues.

In 1946, he was selected to serve UCLA as dean of the College of Letters and Science and occupied this position until 1961. Dodd also served a short stint as acting vice-chancellor of academic affairs(1959–60) and as professor emeritus (1961) until he left the classroom indefinitely.

The Board of Trustees of the California State Colleges in 1962 named Dodd San Francisco State College's university president, which he accepted and served five years (1962–66). After his tenure as president, Dodd retired from educational service.

== Legacy ==
The president of the UC system, Clark Kerr (1958–1967), said Dodd "improved department after department that started UCLA moving toward its current academic standing. It is remarkable that UCLA is the only institution founded since 1900 to rise to the ranks of the top 10 research universities in the country. Paul Dodd is to be particularly credited for this achievement."

Dodd Hall at the University of California, Los Angeles is named in honor of Paul A. Dodd. It is located in the north campus area of UCLA, across from Franklin D. Murphy Hall, the university's administration building. Dodd Hall is home to the departments of art history, classics, and philosophy.

== Publications ==
- Financial policies in the aviation industry (1933)
- Economic aspects of medical services (1939)
