= John Allen Buggs =

John Allen Buggs (November 20, 1915 - March 7, 1995) was a leading advocate for the African American community and former staff director of the United States Civil Rights Commission. He served as an adviser to three U.S. presidents and is known for keeping peace after the 1965 uprisings in the Watts neighborhood of Los Angeles.

== Early life ==
In 1915, Buggs was born in Brunswick, Georgia. He was the son of southern Georgia's first black doctor, Dr. Charles Wesley Buggs.

He earned a bachelor's degree in history from Dillard University in New Orleans and a master's degree in sociology from Fisk University in Nashville.

He married Mary Gale Buggs in 1943 and had two daughters.

== Career ==
Buggs worked for National Association for the Advancement of Colored People in Marion County, Florida, and he was the co-chairman of the Florida State Committee on School Integration.

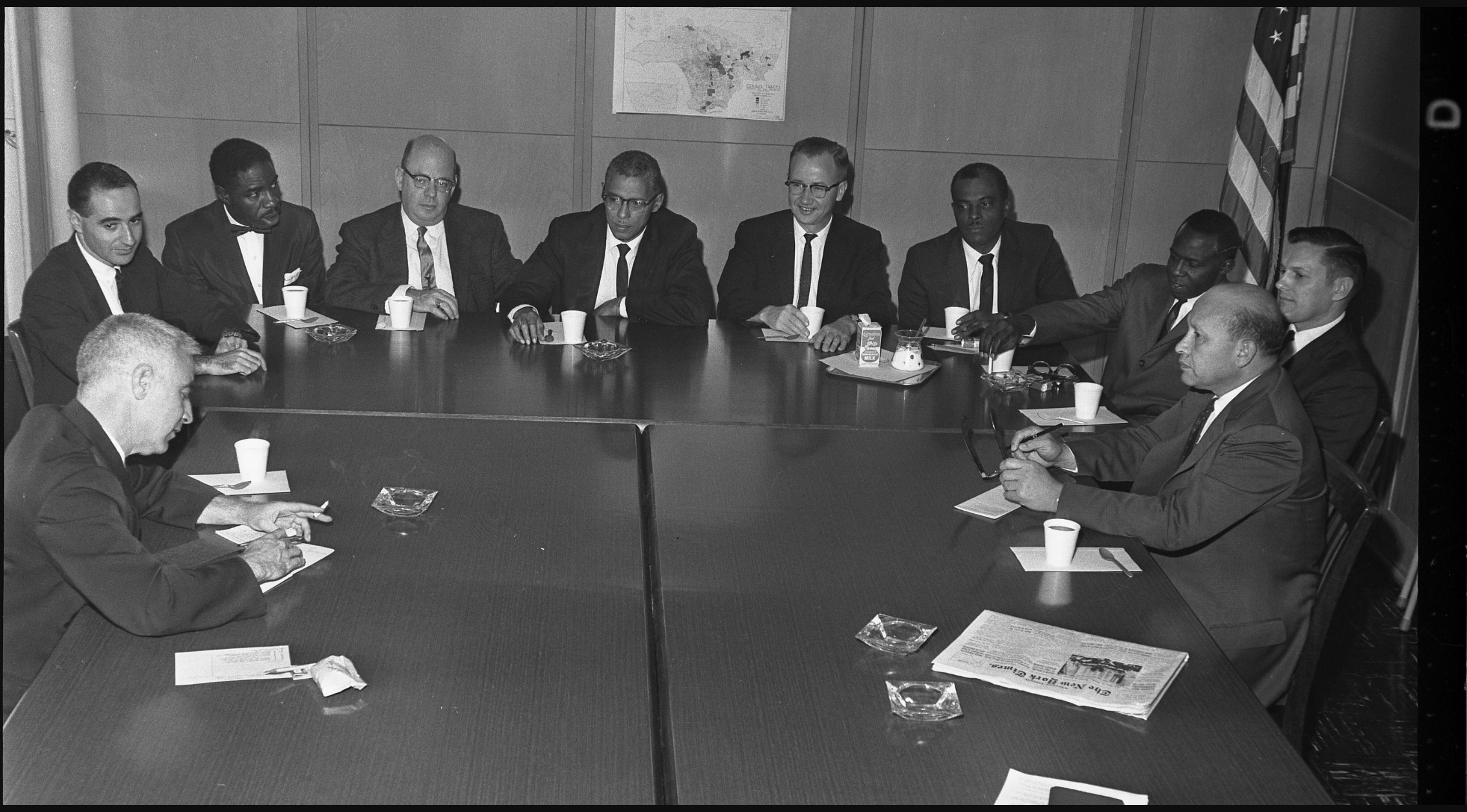
LA Times reporter Paul Weeks, left foreground, interviews staff of the County Commission on Human Relations. From left are Eugene Mornell, Carroll Waymon, Julius Klein, John Allen Buggs, Dr. Walter Cobb, Leon Smith, Walter Ehrhardt and William Gutierrez, right foreground. Buggs, the commission head, foresaw a sharp rise in racial tension here.

From 1954 to 1967, he worked for the Los Angeles County Human Relations Commission and became widely known for his peacemaking after the 1965 uprisings in the Watts neighborhood of Los Angeles. As commissioner, Buggs asked gang leaders for help to calm Watts' black youth, because he believed that developing rapport would be the best way to quell violence and begin healing.

Buggs then served under President Richard M. Nixon, President Gerald R. Ford and President Jimmy Carter as executive director of the U.S. Commission on Civil Rights and as staff director of the Model Cities Administration at the Department of Housing and Urban Development. He retired in 1978 after suffering a stroke.

The Los Angeles County Human Relations Commission established the John Allen Buggs Leadership Award to honor public officials for their work in advocacy and leadership. Recipients of this award include Kent Wong, Sheila Kuehl, and James Lawson.

A collection of his papers can be found in the Amistad Research Center at Tulane University.

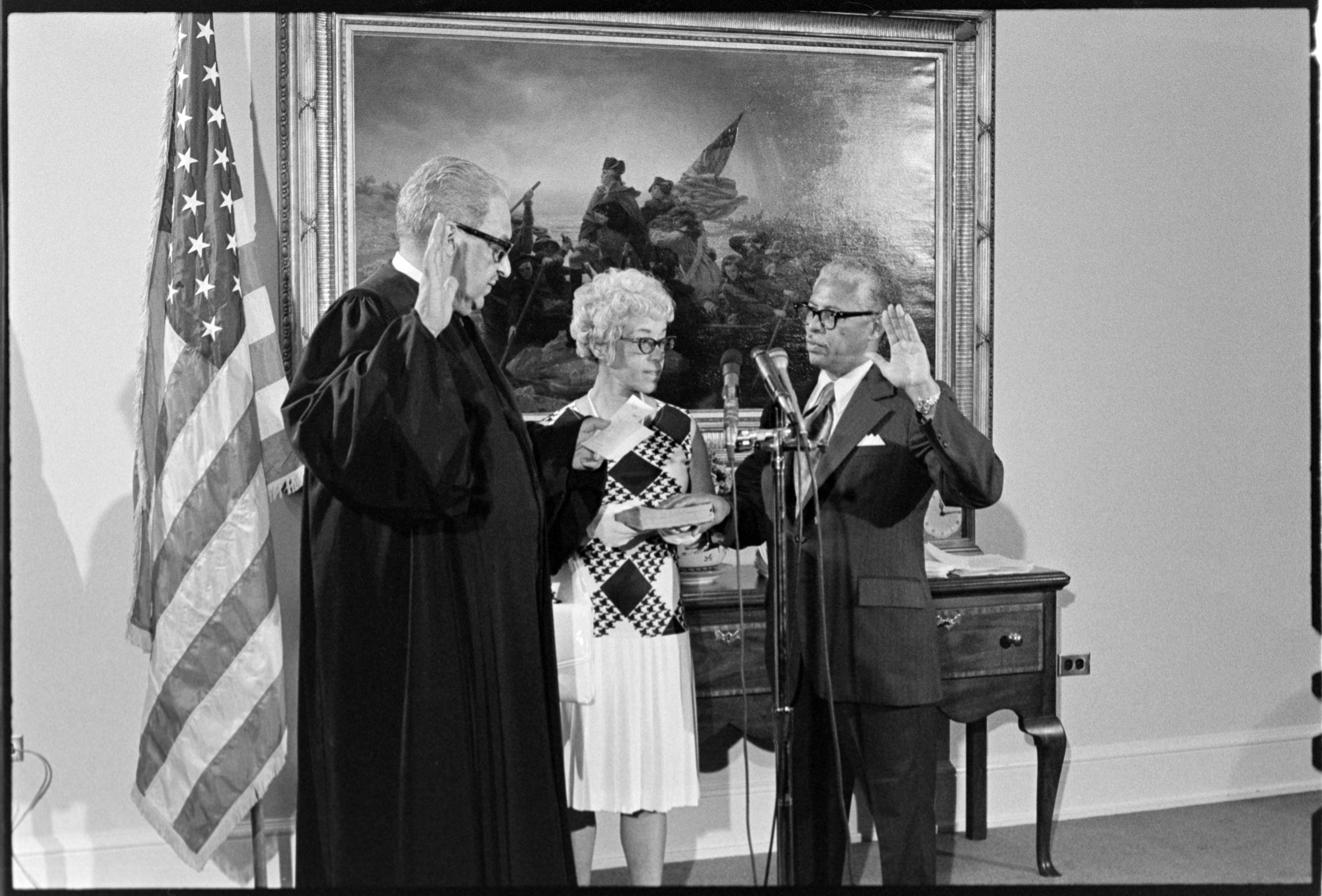
Justice Thurgood Marshall swearing in John Allen Buggs to Civil Rights Commission as Mrs. Buggs Looks On

== Publications ==
- Buggs, John A., "Because We Were Here," The Negro Educational Review; Vol. 27, Iss. 1, (Jan 1, 1976): 5.
- Buggs, John A., "Groups Rights Struggles Are Mutually Beneficial," Journal of Intergroup Relations, Vol. 4, Iss. 1, 38–50, (Apr 1975)
