= California DREAM Act =

Package of California state laws

California State Legislature
- Full name: California Dream Act
- Introduced: February 19, 2010
- Assembly voted: August 31, 2010
- Senate voted: August 31, 2010
- Signed into law: October 8, 2011
- Sponsor: Gil Cedillo
- Governor: Jerry Brown
- Code: Education Code
- Section: 68130.7, 68130.5, 66021.6, 66021.7, 76300.5
- Resolution: SB 1460 (2009–2010 Session)
- Associated bills: AB 131 (2011-12 Session), SB 1 (2007–2008 Session), SB 160 (2005–2006 Session)

Status: Not passed (Awaiting approval of UC Regents)

The California DREAM (Development, Relief, and Education for Alien Minors) Act is a package of California state laws that allow children who were brought into the US under the age of 16 without proper visas/immigration documentation who have attended school on a regular basis and otherwise meet in-state tuition and GPA requirements to apply for student financial aid benefits. It and past similarly named legislation have been authored by California State Senator Gil Cedillo.

In 2011, the California Dream Act was divided into two bills, AB130 and AB131. AB130 was signed by Governor Jerry Brown on July 25, 2011, and AB131 was signed by Brown on October 8, 2011.

AB 130 allows students who meet AB 540 criteria to apply for non-state funded scholarships for colleges and universities. AB 131 allows students who meet AB 540 criteria to apply for state-funded financial aid.

== Legislative history ==
=== Schwarzenegger administration ===
In 2006, the California DREAM Act was proposed in the form of SB 160. Under SB 160, students who were eligible for in-state tuition would have been given access to public financial assistance (undocumented students had already been eligible for private assistance) for higher education at California State Colleges and Universities. In addition, those students would have been given a fee waiver for California Community Colleges. It passed in both houses but was vetoed by Governor Arnold Schwarzenegger.

In 2007, during the next session of the legislature, another version of the bill in the form of "SB 1". This bill would have offered similar fee waivers for high school graduates who met non-resident in-state tuition requirements. Again, the bill passed both houses of the California state legislature. Schwarzenegger vetoed it again on 14 October 2007 citing cost concerns.

In 2008, SB 1301, which remained unchanged from SB 1, was vetoed by the Governor.

In 2009, SB 160 was held in Senate Appropriations Committee in 2009.

In 2010 Gil Cedillo introduced the bill as SB 1460. It passed the State Senate on 3 June 2010 and the State Assembly on 20 August 2010. It went back to both houses again and passed in both on 31 August 2010.

=== Brown administration ===
On January 11, 2011 Assemblyman Cedillo reintroduced the legislation as two separate bills, AB130, and AB131. AB 130 was signed into law by Jerry Brown on July 25, 2011, granting undocumented students access to an estimated $88 million in private financial aid in the form of scholarships and grants. AB 131, which allows undocumented students who meet criteria for in-state tuition to apply for financial aid, was signed by Brown on October 8.

=== Overview of AB 131 ===
AB 131 directly affects those students who are exempt from paying out of state tuition at California Community Colleges and the California State University as stated in Section 68130.7 of the California Education Code Those students would include undocumented immigrants who graduate from high school and who show “merit and need”.

Under AB 131, those students mentioned above and those students who meet the requirements are “eligible to apply for and participate in all student financial aid programs administered by the State of California to the full extent permitted by federal law”. Cal Grants represent the major source of aid that these students would gain access to. A Cal Grant is a form of aid that represents funds available to students that meet GPA, parent income, and high school graduation requirements. AB 131 would not give those students mentioned above access to Competitive Cal Grant A and B awards unless the specified conditions are met. One source has cited that AB 131 would open an estimated $38 million worth of financial assistance to undocumented students. AB 131 would also require California Community Colleges who are under the administration of the “Board of Governors of the California Community Colleges” to waive certain fees for those students who are exempt from paying out of state tuition. (info. Sen. Pg 3) Some students are excluded from the benefits associated with AB 131 as stipulated by the bill. Graduates of technical schools and adult schools would not be considered eligible under the new law. Governor Jerry Brown also made an amendment to the bill that postponed implementation until January 2013.

== Supporting arguments for AB 131 ==
Some argue that AB 131 would not be a financial burden on the state of California. The bill represents an investment in the future of the state in that undocumented students would be given greater access to higher education. As a result of more undocumented students completing their higher education, these students would be more skilled and less likely to remain lower-class. The danger of not providing these students with an opportunity to become more productive members of the state's economy could be the further draining of the state's resources by adding to the group of people dependent on state assistance. Instead, these students would add to the pool of qualified workers while contributing taxes back to the state. It is estimated that there will be a gap of 6% between jobs needed and qualified workers in the state of California by the year 2025. Allowing these students to continue their education could help close that gap if they were able to gain a “legal” status.

== Arguments against AB 131 ==
Others argue that opening up public scholarships and grants to undocumented students comes at an inopportune time for the state of California. Tuition hikes and financial woes have weighed heavily on California's public Colleges and Universities, and some say an influx of undocumented students could cause further strain on this system. One source cited that AB 131 could cost the state between $23 and $65 million a year. Also, even with access to higher education, undocumented graduates would still not be eligible to work legally in the U.S., as Congress has yet to pass a Federal law allowing undocumented persons to work legally in the U.S. There is a possibility, however, that Congress will pass such legislation. The federal DREAM Act aims to provide a pathway to citizenship for those students who meet a list of federal requirements. Other critics argue that AB 131 would only attract more undocumented immigrants to the U.S. by offering them financial assistance. While others argue, AB 131 creates greater competition for U.S. citizens who depend on public financial aid to pay their college or university tuition.

== Referendum (repeal) ==
The movement to repeal the AB131 was tried. It was led by Tim Donnelly, the assemblyman, and Tom Del Beccaro, chairman of the state's Republican Party. The bill would have been held and put to the general election. At the same time, the recalling effort for the governor, Jerry Brown, is also in process.

== Historical context ==
The federal DREAM ACT was first introduced in the Senate on August 1, 2001. It was a plan for joint immigration and education reform aimed at granting young undocumented immigrants access to both higher education, and citizenship. The Act would grant these students legal residence if they attend college or serve in the military.[14] While this legislation has not yet been passed, it is the product of much deliberation and debate over the issue of immigration in the U.S. As more and more undocumented immigrants enter the U.S. each year, the U.S. has become more and more divided over policies aimed at addressing the causes and effects of immigration. While some states such as Georgia and Alabama have adopted strict immigration laws in order to keep undocumented immigrants out, others have looked for ways to address the needs of immigrants. The proposal for the federal DREAM ACT was quickly followed by the California DREAM Act, a state initiative aimed at providing a pathway for young undocumented immigrants already in the state.

Each year about 25,000 undocumented students graduate from high school in California. The California Dream (Development, Relief and Education for Alien Minors) Act would allow children who were brought to the United States illegally before the age of 16 to receive state funded financial aid for higher education. Currently the state of California allows undocumented students to pay in-state tuition if they have lived and attended school in California for the past three years. That bill was signed into legislation in 2001. Supporters of the California DREAM Act cite limited work authorization for many undocumented students as another contributing factor to challenges financing higher education. According to a study by The University of California, Los Angeles in 2015, among undocumented students who dropped out of higher education, 73.9% cited financial difficulties as the main reason for this decision.

Assemblyman Gil Cedillo, D-Los Angeles, the original sponsor of the bill, has tried to introduce newer versions of the bill since 2006. There are only two other states that offer financial aid to undocumented students, Texas and New Mexico. Cedillo has tried to find ways around concerns that critics have raised about the bill. He split the bill into two parts. The first part, which would not cost the state anything, would allow students to apply for non-state grants from colleges. The second part would let students apply for state-funded Cal Grants.

From the supporters' view, according to Tom Mays, a spokesperson for the California Student Aid Commission said, “The money is already set aside.” Mays also stated that there is usually a surplus of money available after all of the college grants have been distributed.

Cedillo also introduced another version of the California DREAM Act, SB 1460. It included the Community College Fee Waivers. Another bill that included 19 million dollars for Cal-Grants, AB 1413 Fuented-Coto Cal-Grants was voted out in the assembly.

== See also ==
- United States DREAM Act, federal legislation proposed in the US Congress
- Board of Governors Fee Waiver Download.
- BOG Fee Waiver Application Online.
