= A Collective Bargain =

2020 non-fiction book by Jane McAlevey

A Collective Bargain: Unions, Organizing, and the Fight for Democracy
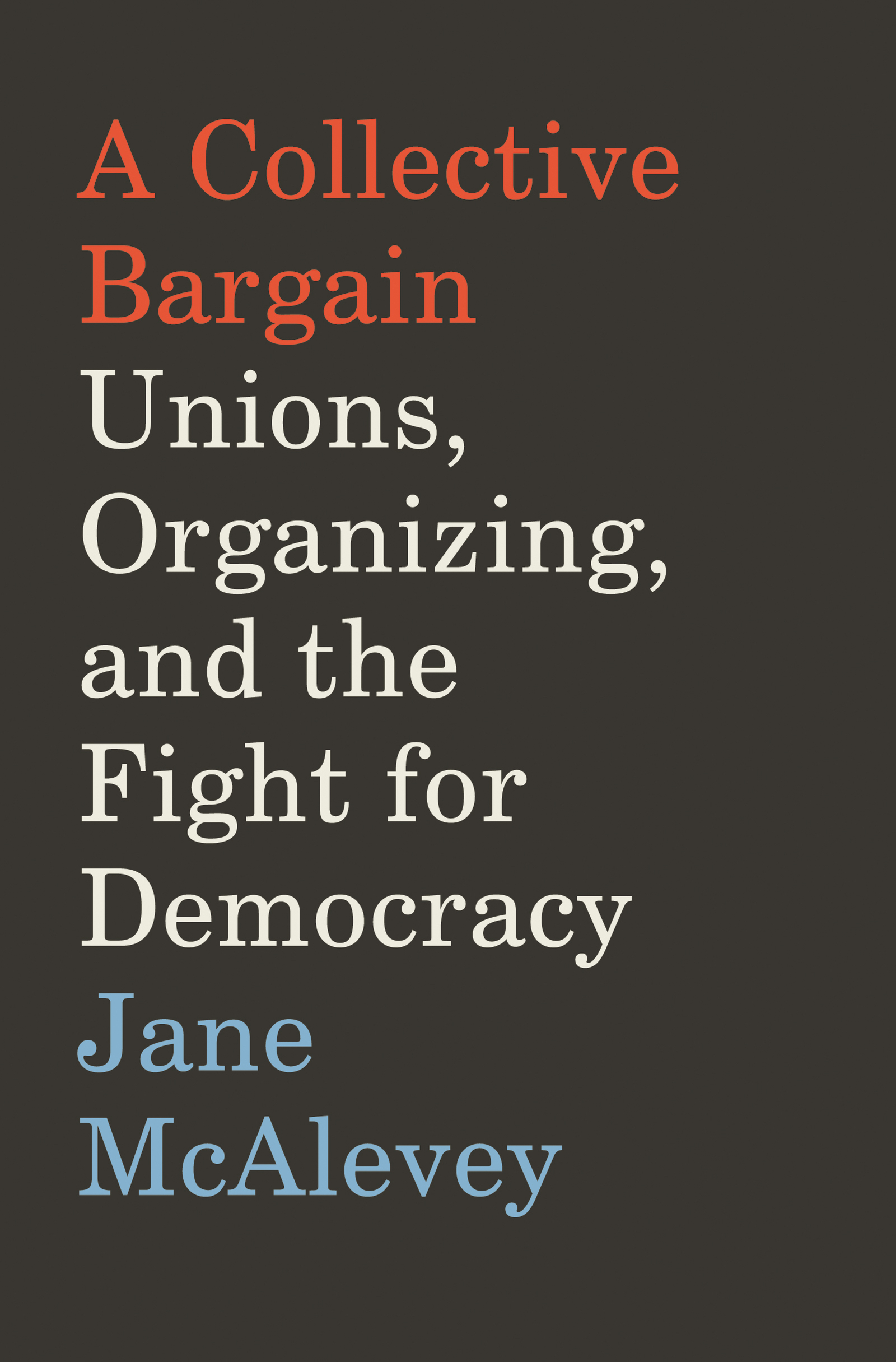
- 1st edition cover
- Author: Jane McAlevey
- Audio read by: Jane McAlevey
- Cover artist: Sara Wood
- Language: English
- Subject: Labor unions
- Publisher: Ecco Press
- Publication date: January 7, 2020
- Publication place: United States
- Media type: Print (hardcover), e-book, audiobook
- Pages: 304
- ISBN: 978-0-06-290859-9 (hardcover)
- OCLC: 1111649110
- Dewey Decimal: 331.890973
- LC Class: HD6508 .M228 2019

A Collective Bargain: Unions, Organizing, and the Fight for Democracy is a 2020 non-fiction book by union organizer Jane McAlevey. The book makes the case that unions are the only institution capable of confronting the corporate class.

A German edition was published by VSA: Verlag, a division of Springer Science+Business Media, on May 1, 2021, with the title "Macht.Gemeinsame Sache."

== Overview ==
Chapters include "Workers Can Still Win Big", "Who Killed the Unions", "Everything You Thought You Knew About Unions was (Mostly) Wrong", "Are Unions Still Relevant?", "How Do Workers Get a Union?", "How To Rebuild A Union", and "As Go Unions, So Goes The Republic".

== Critical response ==
In the New Yorker, Eleni Shermer wrote, "Her latest book argues that systematic grassroots organizing is the key to repairing today’s ravaged democracy. It is a glossier, more generalized account than her previous works, but its publication marks the arrival of her core ideas into the liberal mainstream."

In Jacobin, Sam Gindin wrote, "Her new book offers concrete tactics and practices for how workers can win more battles — and prepare for the larger wars to come. ... Where McAlevey has shortcomings, they are generally the collective shortcomings of the Left as a whole. And in her hands, such limits are ... not reasons to despair but challenges to overcome. It’s that sober optimism that apparently keeps McAlevey going and makes engagement with this book, like her other books, so rewarding."

In Isthmus, Don Taylor wrote, "A Collective Bargain helps explode myths about what happened to unions, and provides a framework for discussing the importance of organized labor in saving and fortifying our democratic society."

In Real Change, Mike Wold wrote: "Jane McAlevey’s ‘A Collective Bargain’ lays out a union organizing plan that could save democracy. ... The bulk of the book is a kind of primer, with extensive examples about how unions work, how to run a successful organizing campaign, and how to win a strike by building unity within the workplace and support in the surrounding community. ... One weakness of the book is that it doesn’t include examples of how to reform undemocratic unions or challenge weak or corrupt union bureaucracies."

In the National Catholic Reporter, Avram Reisman wrote, "McAlevey's case is generally sound. Strong, well-organized, democratic unions are the key to winning in the workplace and their tactics may be effective in broader democratic fights because unions are simply smaller-scale democratic systems. ... McAlevey's discussion of the democratic effects of building the union movement is not as fleshed out as it could be."

In Bookforum, Alex Press wrote, "A Collective Bargain offers an introduction to the world of unions and their enemies, disseminating the how-tos of organizing to those people who lack experience in, for example, running supermajority strikes—which is to say, most people. McAlevey’s writing is an attempt to circulate organizers’ skills, breathing life into the long-quiescent labor movement."

Publishers Weekly wrote, "Labor activist McAlevey delivers a persuasive argument that the power of 'strong, democratic' trade unions can fix many of America’s social problems in this timely cri de coeur."
