= Kent Wong =

American labor organizer (1956–2025)

- Born: 1956; Los Angeles, California, U.S.
- Died: October 8, 2025 (aged 68–69); Los Angeles, California, U.S.
- Citizenship: United States
- Education: UC Berkeley and People's College of Law
- Occupation: Director (1991–2023)
- Employer: UCLA Labor Center
- Father: Delbert Wong

Kent Wong (1956 — October 8, 2025) was a labor leader, educator, and scholar. He served as director of the UCLA Labor Center from 1991 to 2023. He died at the age of 69 on October 8, 2025, in Los Angeles.

== Early life ==
Born in 1956, Wong was a fifth generation Chinese American. He grew up in the Los Angeles neighborhood of Silver Lake and attended UC Berkeley and the People's College of Law. As a college student at UC Berkeley, Wong was a volunteer boycott organizer for the United Farm Workers.

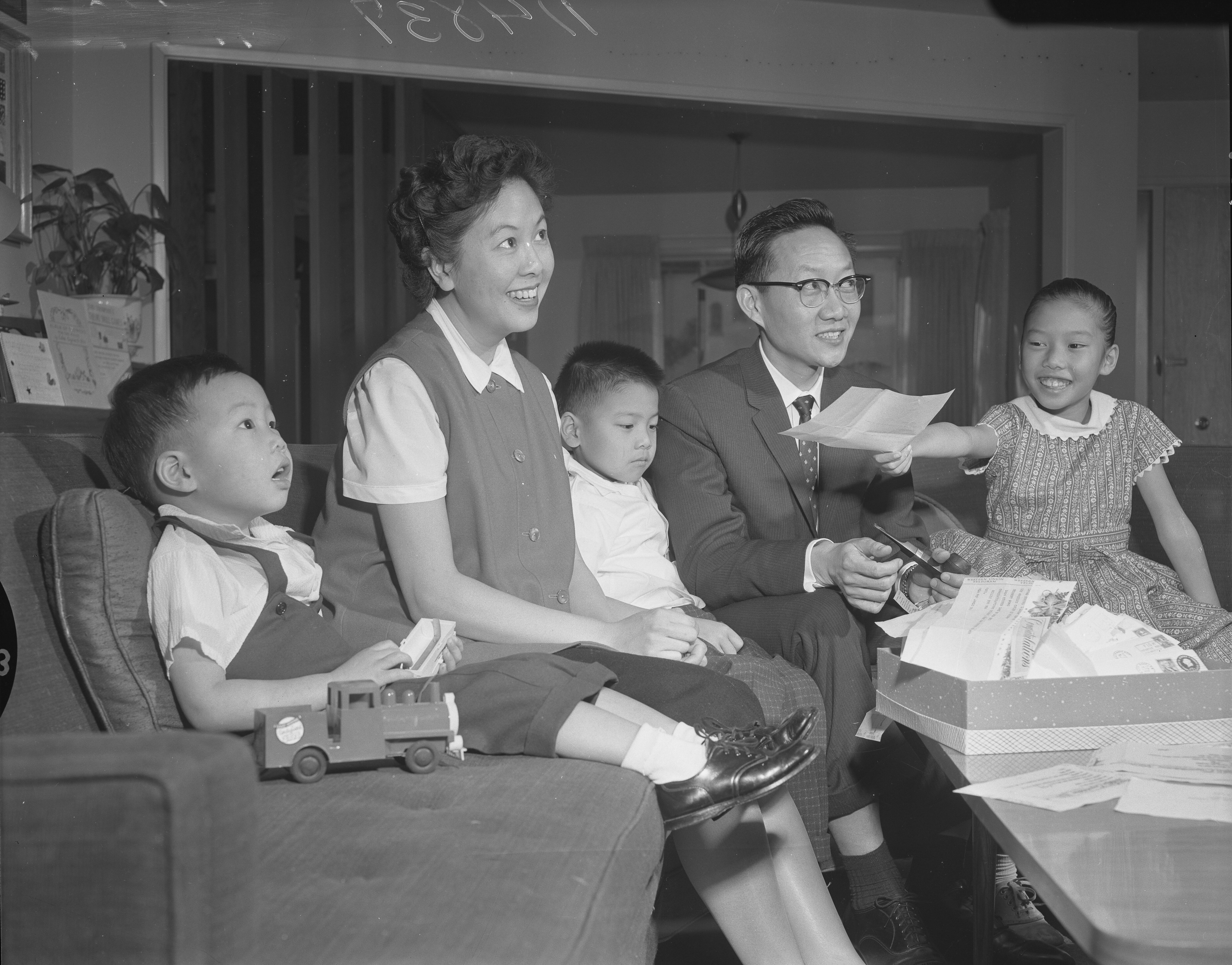
2/2/59; Kent Wong at left at age 2 with his mother (Dolores), brother Duane age 6, father (Delbert), sister Shelley age 8

He was a son of Delbert Wong, the first Chinese American judge in the continental United States, and Dolores Wong, a social worker and community leader in Los Angeles' Chinatown.

He married Jai Lee and had two sons.

== Career ==
Upon graduating from the People's College of Law in 1984, Wong became the first staff attorney of the Asian Pacific American Legal Center for Southern California (now called Asian American Advancing Justice). Wong then worked as staff attorney for the Service Employees International Union. He was the founding president of the United Association for Labor Education and a vice president for the California Federation of Teachers. Wong also served as the first president of the Asian Pacific American Labor Alliance (AFL-CIO) in 1992. Wong was also a founding member of the academic journal New Labor Forum.

He became director of the UCLA Labor Center in 1991. He established a permanent home for the UCLA Labor Center in MacArthur Park in 2021. At UCLA, he advocated for undocumented students and their ability to be employed at the university.

As a noted labor scholar, Wong was often consulted for his perspectives on a wide variety of labor issues such as unionization at Amazon, Asian American unemployment, the growth of labor unions in the Los Angeles area, fast food workers' unions, and unions' political influence.

In 2024, Wong won the John Allen Buggs Leadership Award from the Los Angeles County Commission on Human Relations for his human relations advocacy and leadership.

== Select publications ==
- Asian American Workers Rising: APALA's Struggle to Transform the Labor Movement edited by Kent Wong, Matthew Finucani, Tracy Lai, Kim Geron, Emmelle Israel, and Julie Monroe (2021), UCLA Labor Center, ISBN 978-0-89215-086-1
- Revolutionary Nonviolence: Organizing for Freedom by James M. Lawson, Michael K. Honey, and Kent Wong (2022), University California Press, https://doi.org/10.2307/j.ctv2j6xfhm
- Work and Inequality in the Global Economy: China, Mexico, and the United States by Chris Tilly and Kent Wong (2010), New Labor Forum,19(3):48-50, DOI:10.1353/nlf.2010.0010
- Undocumented and Unafraid: Tam Tran and Cinthya Felix by Kent Wong and Matias Ramos (2011), Boom: A Journal of California, University of California Press, https://doi.org/10.1525/boom.2011.1.1.10
