= Vicki Gabriner =

American civil rights activist

Vicki Gabriner (1942–2018) was an American civil rights activist, feminist and LGBT rights activist who became an activist when she was just a student. She was briefly a member of Weathermen, which was the radical student activist group in the late 1960s. In 2002, Gabriner was honored at the Women Who Dared event in Boston.

== Early life ==
Gabriner was born in Homecrest, Brooklyn, New York, and raised in politically active family. Her mother and she had a lot of conversations about the importance of fighting for social justice. Her mother, Edna Levins, was president of the PTA, which organized against McCarthy-era legislation and put on concerts, mainly of socially conscious performers. Gabriner went to Cornell University, where she got involved in civil rights organizing and graduated in 1963.

== Activism ==
Gabriner went to Fayette County, Tennessee with a Cornell-affiliated group for three summers (1964–1966). She taught at freedom schools, worked on local elections, voter registration, and integration of public facilities. She earned a master's degree in education at the University of Wisconsin–Madison. Gabriner, who moved to New York in 1968, taught in a decentralized school. In the meanwhile, she joined the radical student activist group, "The Weathermen" (also known as the Weather Organization). She had ambivalent feelings about this group. Then, she went to Cuba with the Venceromos Brigade. After she became a feminist, she moved to Atlanta in 1970 and she came out as a lesbian. Gabriner helped to found the Atlanta Lesbian Feminist Alliance (ALFA) in 1972, which became one of the earliest and longest running lesbian feminist organizations. In 1974, she worked as lead organizer for Georgians for the ERA.

Gabriner moved to Boston in 1979, where she worked as a civil rights investigator responding to federal Equal Opportunity Act infringements and as executive director at Sojourner, a feminist publication.

=== Weathermen and Gabriner ===
Weathermen was a radical left-wing group which carried out bombings, jailbreaks, riots from 1969 through the 1970s.< In 1973, Gabriner was arrested in Atlanta on charges of accomplice to passport fraud connected to her brief Weathermen involvement. The FBI was seeking information about all Weathermen/SDS participants. Gabriner was tried in Boston Federal Court with Judge W. Arthur Garrity presiding. Her case was slowed by Judge Garrity's responsibilities implementing the desegregation of Boston Public Schools. Gabriner was convicted at trial but in 1978 she won on her appeal with lawyer, Nancy Gertner.

== Writings ==
Gabriner wrote prolifically for publications such as off our backs, Quest: A feminist quarterly, The Great Speckled Bird, ALFA's newsletter Atalanta, Sojourner, and Gay Community News. In 1971 she published Sleeping Beauty: A Lesbian Fairy Tale with Sojourner Truth Press. In 2009, she received her Ph.D. from the Union Institute with a dissertation concerning Homecrest's PTA activism: Peak Time: Progressive Jewish Mothers, the PTA, and the Postwar Red Scare in Brooklyn, New York, 1946-1956. Gabriner's papers were deposited in 2015 to the Schlesinger Library. The Robert and Vicki Gabriner Papers on Fayette County organizing are at The Wisconsin State Historical Society.

== Women Who Dared ==
Gabriner was honored in 2002 by Women Who Dared in Boston.
