= UCLA Labor Center =

University of California department

- Established: 1964
- Parent institution: UCLA Institute for Research on Labor and Employment, University of California, Los Angeles
- Director: Saba Waheed
- Location: Los Angeles, California, United States
- Website: www.labor.ucla.edu

The Labor Center is a research and extension department at the University of California Los Angeles focused on organized labor and labor rights. It was created in 1964 as the Center for Labor Research and Education and is a unit of the UCLA Institute for Research on Labor and Employment.

== History ==
As organized labor in the U.S. reached its height of influence after the Second World War, California lawmakers appropriated funds for the University of California Los Angeles and the University of Berkeley, California to launch industrial relations programs, an initiative also supported by Republican Governor Earl Warren. These Institutes of Industrial Relations (now the Institute for Research on Labor and Employment) were tasked with outreach to both employers and trade unions, but by the 1960s Labor felt itself the junior partner in the arrangement. An agreement between the California Labor Federation and the University of California led in 1964 to the founding of Centers for Labor Research and Education at UCLA and UC Berkeley focusing on issues such as job displacement, the needs of white collar unions, reducing hours of work, and the problems of unemployment. In 2002, the Labor Center opened a downtown location overlooking MacArthur Park in a building that was formerly International Ladies' Garment Workers Union hall. The Downtown Labor Center has supported groups such as the National Day Labor Organization Network, the California Construction Academy, and the Los Angeles Black Worker Center. The Labor Center is also home to the Dream Resource Center, an action research center focusing on issues of immigrant integration, particularly related to undocumented youth. Labor Center research has led to county and state actions to mitigate wage theft. In 2021, the Labor Center's building was rededicated as the UCLA James M. Lawson, Jr. Worker Justice Center.

== Publications ==
- Bernhardt, Annette; et al. (2009). Broken Laws, Unprotected Workers: Violations of employment and Labor Laws in America's Cities.
- Bacon, David (2012). Building a Culture of Cross-Border Solidarity. Los Angeles: UCLA Center for Labor Research and Education.
- Herrera Lima, Fernando, ed. (2012). Juntas de Conciliacion y Arbitraje en Mexico. Los Angeles: UCLA Center for Labor Research and Education.
- Bernhardt, Annette; et al. (2010). Wage Theft and Workplace Violations in Los Angeles: the Failure of Employment and Labor Law for Low-Wage Workers.
- Smallwood Cuevas, Lola; Wong, Kent; Delp, Linda (2009). Women's Work: Los Angeles Homecare Workers Revitalize the Labor Movement. UCLA Center for Labor Research and Education.
- Milkman, Ruth; Bloom, Joshua; Narro, Victor (2010). Working for Justice: The L.A. Model of Organizing and Advocacy. Ithaca: Cornell University Press.

== See also ==
- Kent Wong
