= Stamford Organizing Project =

Trade union/community partnership

The Stamford Organizing Project (SOP) was an experimental multi-trade union coalition in Stamford, Connecticut, launched by the American Federation of Labor and Congress of Industrial Organizations (AFL-CIO) in 1997. Led by labor organizer Jane McAlevey from 1997 to 2001, the project established a collaboration between four unions representing a range of service-sector workers, and worked closely with the community on workplace and community goals, chiefly affordable housing. McAlevey developed her whole-worker organizing model at the SOP.

By 2001, the SOP had helped over 4,000 workers to form unions, win contracts, and secure $15 million for public housing improvements.

== Background ==
In the mid-1960s, Stamford leadership began to remake the town into a major commercial center. Over the years, it cleared 99 acres of the downtown area to make room for corporate headquarters. The mostly minority and low-income residents were displaced; over a thousand largely African-American families were forced to move. By the 1990s, Stamford had the third most Fortune 500 corporate headquarters in the United States, after New York and Chicago, and the luxury housing market was thriving in what had become the richest county in the country. Service-sector workers – janitors, taxi drivers, nursing home and hotel workers, home health aides, city clerks – earning at or about minimum wage, could barely pay rent for whatever housing they could find. The town also had the highest concentration of non-unionized workers in the state, making it a prime target for the SOP's experimental approach of uniting unions in common cause. Another locational advantage for the project: there were no large, established community organizations in the town, avoiding the prospect of conflicts over agendas and territory.

The political situation in Stamford also offered a critical opportunity for support from the state government. Connecticut, a "blue state" with a labor-friendly Democratic state legislature, had one the highest rates of union organization in the US. A large number of state-level representatives and top officials were from the Stamford area while the town itself had an "almost entirely white" leadership "overwhelmingly supportive of a pro-business, pro-growth agenda", and the lowest level of union representation in the state. As McAlevey later noted, there was "no union density in a quickly growing red region where the elected leaders in the state legislature were coming from — so blue state, but growing red region negatively impacting state policy."

== Approach ==
The SOP approach established an unprecedented close working relationship between Region 9A of the United Auto Workers (UAW), Justice for Janitors Local 531 within the Service Employees International Union (SEIU), healthcare workers' District 1199 New England (SEIU), and Hotel Employees and Restaurant Employees (HERE) Local 217. Organizers from the four union locals shared common office space with AFL-CIO support staff, and coordinated their efforts. Also unusual for labor unions, the SOP worked closely with the community. The strategy was to organize workers to in turn self-organize not only at work, but also in their neighborhoods, and through their churches, ethnic organizations and voting precincts.

During the SOP's initial internal negotiations, the unions agreed to define their core industries in order to avoid conflicts over jurisdiction. Full-scale organizing began in 1998. Five project organizers paid by the AFL-CIO worked with and coordinated the individual union locals: a staff organizer might one day visit nursing home workers with one union, and the next day accompany another union meeting with taxi drivers. Leaders and staff from the four unions participated in all SOP actions. McAlevey worked with union leadership to ensure their focus stayed on the SOP mission of building overall union power, rather than concentrating narrowly on their individual interests.

Using geographic information systems and expert academic help, the SOP developed a "comprehensive charting" method to map member data. Information from union records and member surveys was used to geographically map membership concentration, members' residences, family members, and affiliations including religious groups, schools, clubs, community groups.

== Results ==
By 2001, the SOP had helped over 4,000 workers to form unions, win contracts, save four public housing projects from demolition and secure $15 million for improvements. The workers also won city ordinances requiring a percentage of affordable units in every new residential development, and one-for-one replacement of demolished or decommissioned public and publicly-assisted housing, at the same level of affordability.

== Legacy ==
Reporting in The Nation in 2024, writer, researcher and organizer Eleni Schirmer commented that the SOP "established what would become Jane [McAlevey]'s hallmark style: big, bulging goals and a basketball-like execution plan—the precision of a thousand tiny repetitions; inviting people to touch their power."
