= SEIU Local 660 =

Former American labor union

- Service Employees International Union Local 660
- Headquarters: Los Angeles, California
- Location: United States
- Members: 50,000
- Key people: Alejandro Stephens, president
- Parent organization: SEIU
- Website: www.seiu660.org

The SEIU Local 660 was a local union of the Service Employees International Union in the United States. It represented 50,000 Los Angeles County employees. The Union was investigated by the FBI for alleged embezzlement, specifically the former leader Alejandro Stephens. It later merged with SEIU Local 721.
