= Charis Books & More =

Independent bookstore in Decatur, Georgia, United States

Coordinates: 33.7682°N 84.2915°W

- Type: Book store
- Founded: 1974
- Founder: Linda Bryant and Barbara Borgman
- Headquarters: Decatur, Georgia, United States
- Owner: Sara Luce Look and Angela Gabriel
- Website: charisbooksandmore.com

Charis Books & More is an independent bookstore located in Decatur, Georgia. The store is the oldest independent feminist bookstore in the Southern U.S. Charis Books was founded in 1974 by Linda Bryant and Barbara Borgman in the Little Five Points district of Atlanta. In 2019, Charis moved to Decatur and became the bookstore of Agnes Scott College. The store specializes in diverse children's books, feminist literature, and LGBTQ literature.

== Description ==
Charis Books & More is the oldest independent feminist bookstore in the South and one of the oldest bookstores in the Atlanta area. The store's collection is focused on diverse children's books, feminist and cultural studies books, and lesbian, gay, bisexual, transgender, and queer fiction and nonfiction. In 2017, nonprofit organization We Need Diverse Books named Charis co-owner Sara Luce Look as the first person to be awarded their Bookseller of the Year Award. The award recognized Charis Books' promotion of literature that reflects the diversity of young readers. E.R. Anderson, the executive director of Charis Circle, noted in the nomination letter that "Charis Books was one of the first bookstores to have an LGBTQ kids' section (in the '80s), and has always had books for kids with disabilities, books for kids with parents in jail, and books for kids who are raised by a grandparent or foster parent or two dads or a single mom." In addition to books, the store offers Agnes Scott College merchandise, convenience store items, apparel with the store's logo, pride flags, greeting cards, stickers, and more.

The store serves as a meeting group space and community center, especially for people from marginalized backgrounds. Charis hosts programming, community education, and community organizing events. The back of the store has a couch, chairs, and tables where people are encouraged to read and talk, and where programs and events take place. Charis Circle, the store's associated nonprofit organization, hosts over 200 events each year, including anti-racist discussion groups, trans youth support groups, and zine making workshops, along with author readings and book groups.

== History ==
Charis Books opened November 4, 1974 at 419 Moreland Avenue in Atlanta's Little Five Points district. The store's name, Charis (pronounced KA-riss), comes from the Greek word for "gift" or "thanks," a reference to wanting to be a gift to the community as well as the gift of being able to open the store. The bookstore's founders, Linda Bryant and Barbara Borgman, worked to reach out to communities in the area. Charis Books was originally founded with an emphasis on radical theology, women's fiction, and a large selection of nonsexist and nonracist children's books; over its first eight years it developed into a feminist bookstore featuring lesbian-feminist books and run predominantly by lesbians. A new partner, Maya Smith, brought expertise in lesbian-feminist literature when she joined the store in 1977. An advisory board was formed to make collective decisions for the store in the late 1970s, and a partnership model of ownership developed.

In 1994, the store moved to a lavender-colored house at 1189 Euclid Avenue, directly across the street from their first location. Charis would remain in this space for two decades. The affiliated nonprofit Charis Circle was established in 1996, which oversees workshops, support groups, and other events and programming to support the community. The nonprofit organization is located in the same space as the bookstore. The Euclid Avenue building was sold in 2016, but the bookstore owners continued to lease the space for another two years as they planned their next move. Charis employee Sara Luce Look became an owner of the store in 1997; in 2005 she was joined as a co-owner by Angela Gabriel.

Charis Books formed a partnership with Agnes Scott College in 2019, serving as the school's bookstore. In April 2019, the bookstore reopened in a newly renovated 19,000-square-foot house at 184 South Candler Street in Decatur, across the street from the campus. The new location also features a 100-person event space. The bookstore closed for most of 2020 and part of 2021 due to COVID-19, but it continued to do business through its e-commerce website.
