= UCLA Institute for Research on Labor and Employment =

Research unit

The UCLA Institute for Research on Labor and Employment
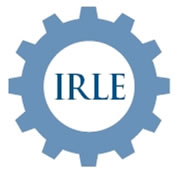
- Established: 1945
- Affiliations: University of California, Los Angeles
- Director: Tobias Higbie
- Location: Ueberroth Building, Los Angeles, CA, USA; 34.0640°N 118.4469°W
- Campus: Urban
- Website: www.irle.ucla.edu

The UCLA Institute for Research on Labor and Employment (IRLE) is an interdisciplinary research unit within the College of Letters & Science, Division of Social Science, dedicated to research, teaching, and discussion of labor and employment issues. It was founded in 1945 as the UCLA Institute of Industrial Relations. It is part of a network of research programs in the University of California system and research units on six other campuses. The IRLE is home to the UCLA Labor Center, the Labor Occupational Safety and Health Program (LOSH), the Human Resources Round Table, and other research programs. The IRLE also supports the UCLA Labor Studies undergraduate program.

== History ==
The University of California has been involved in workers' education since the early 1920s when its program within the University Extension affiliated with the California Federation of Labor and the Workers' Education Bureau of America (WEB). From 1933 to 1941, the workers' education program co-sponsored a summer school for workers known variously as the Western Industrial Summer School and the Pacific Coast Labor School. Similar programs existed at the University of Wisconsin, and in independent programs like Brookwood Labor College. During the 1930s, the political climate of California became increasingly more progressive. While Upton Sinclair's bid for governor and his End Poverty in California campaign ultimately failed, many of his progressive Democratic supporters won their seats in the California legislature. In 1939, under Governor Culbert Olson, Democratic legislators introduced the Labor Extension Bill that would have provided $400,000 (adjusted to $6.5 million in 2012 dollars) in the biennial budget for "a statewide program of education for labor leaders and wage earners through the University of California Extension. However, the bill did not pass.

In 1945, the California legislature created Institutes of Industrial Relations (IIR) at the Los Angeles and Berkeley campuses. Clark Kerr and Paul A. Dodd were appointed as the first directors of UC Berkeley and UCLA division respectively. Kerr later reminisced, apparently unaware of earlier efforts, "We came in as the very first effort of this big university to make contact with the trade unions. It was Earl Warren’s way of saying that the unions were recognized as an important part of California society." Unlike the University Extension program, the IIR was under the control of university faculty and focused on research rather than popular education. In 1964, the university created the Centers for Labor Research and Education (or Labor Centers) at UCLA and UC Berkeley to more directly serve organized labor. However, interest and support for labor studies began to decline during the 1980s with the decline of trade union influence. Budget cuts in the early 1990s eliminated over 50% of the IIR's funding, and by the end of the decade, UCLA IIR's budget was only half of Berkeley's. Renewed academic interest in labor issues, new leadership in the AFL–CIO, and Democratic party gains in the state legislature led to renewed state funding, and in 2007 the IIRs at Berkeley and UCLA were renamed Institutes for Labor and Employment (ILE).

In December 2003, Governor Arnold Schwarzenegger declared a fiscal state of emergency and called for a $150 million budget cut. From 2000 to 2003, the ILE's budget was cut down by 33%. In early 2004, following expressions of public support for the ILE, the University of California directly covered most of staff salaries through June 2004. In 2005, Governor Schwarzenegger used his line-item veto to reject a $3.8 million fund for labor research at the University of California. Some conservatives groups, including the anti-union trade association Associated Builders and Contractors, have voiced their criticism for labor studies programs, remarking that public funds should not advocate "pro-labor" causes. Labor unions defended labor research programs, citing their importance in understanding and improving issues that affect workers. Democrats have criticized Governor Schwarzenegger for singling out the labor program, but overall the California legislature voted to increase funding for the university system. Starting 2004 and 2005, the ILE was restructured to maintain statewide research funding on all UC Campuses through a new Labor and Research Education Fund. Activities continued in the UCLA and UC Berkeley Institutes, but both changed their names in 2007 to the current Institute for Research on Labor and Employment, along with the establishment of the Miguel Contreras Labor Program which supported UC-wide labor research programs.

In 2008, Governor Schwarzenegger used his line-item veto to eliminate $5.4 million funding the Miguel Contreras Labor Program. Governor Schwarzenegger argued that the budget cuts were necessary in order to save money for the state, and the veto was not a commentary on the value of the programs. However, Chris Tilly, the director of the UCLA IRLE argued that saving 5.4 million from the 3.3 billion UC funding was insignificant; full funding cuts overburden faculty, staff, and students that worked hard to build up the UC labor studies program. After the support of more than 400 UC faculty and academic staff members, the University of California, Office of President agreed to continue funding the program for the fiscal year.

Following the election of Jerry Brown as governor, funding for the IRLEs was restored. The UCLA Institute for Research on Labor and Employment continues to support its programs through external fund-raising efforts in addition to campus, state, and federal level funding. Through these efforts, the UCLA IRLE has become the largest contract and grant recipient in the UCLA Division of Social Sciences. In 2022, the California legislature allocated new funds to augment existing UC labor research and education programs, and establish new programs on six additional UC campuses.

== Programs and research ==
=== Programs ===
The Institute supports the Labor Studies interdepartmental degree program that offers a bachelor's degree and a minor in Labor Studies. The curriculum explores contemporary and historical views of work, labor movements, and social policies. Students learn through traditional classroom setting, field research, and internship experiences.

The IRLE also sponsors the Labor Occupational Safety & Health Program (LOSH) works with workers, unions, community organizations, and academic and health professionals in improving environmental health concerns. LOSH provides health and safety training to workers managing hazardous wastes or involved in emergency response release to environmental hazards.

The Human Resources Round Table (HAART) is a sub-division of the IRLE that connects academics and human resource professionals to discuss the challenges that meet human resources today. Founded in 1986, HAART is also associated with Anderson School of Management, Luskin School of Public Affairs, and the School of Law.

The UCLA Labor Center is a sub-division of the IRLE that focuses on applying research by the IRLE for advocacy in the workplace and education. The Labor Center hosts multiple programs that reaches out to minorities to address immigration issues, education, and equal opportunities at the work. The labor center works directly with unions to assist in improving conditions in low-wage work and advocate to strengthen the laws that protect these workers.

=== Major publications ===
From the 1950s continuing onto today, IRLE continues to research the role of healthcare and welfare in the place; other research have examined resource management and the relationship between employers and employees. IRLE Publications during the 1970s focused primarily on the relationship between public sector and workplace relations; whereas private sector work has been granted by the federal government to collectively bargain, government jobs and other public sector work still lacked the power to unionize. The IRLE would continue their research of public sector employee rights well into the late 80's, due to the disastrous strike-breaking of the Professional Air Traffic Controllers Organization (PATCO) in 1981. Today, the IRLE examines the phenomena of globalization and the impact it has on the workplace. Research for developing public policies focus on neither local nor national levels; rather it looks at global strategies to improve low-wage and atypical employment.

IRLE Research focuses on both local and global levels of labor issues. The IRLE accepts visiting scholars and graduate students to spend up to one year in residence to work on research and contribute to the IRLE Working Papers series. UCLA faculty and graduate student research on labor-related topics in multiple academic disciplines. The Working Papers series currently holds 71 publications published from 2006 to 2014.

From 2001 to 2004, the IIR published The State of California Labor, which examines the key developments in California labor. The journal includes discussions and research in trends of employment and the workforce and serves as a critical resource for academics, policy makers, union organizers, and the public.

On Labor Day, the IRLE annually publishes its "The State of the Unions" report. This report compiles a profile of union membership in the Greater Los Angeles Area, San Francisco Bay Area, California, and the nation as a whole. The report is based on the analysis of the U.S. Current Population Survey Outgoing Rotation Group. It analyzes the effectiveness of unions in combating income equality and other labor issues; in 2014, the report summarizes "while unions can insulate lower educated workers from income inequality, they are less effective at combating living cost problems."

== See also ==
UCLA Labor Center
