= Michaelian =

Michaelian is a last name. Notable people with this last name include:

- Katharyn Michaelian Powers (born 1943), American television writer
- Michael Michaelian, co-writer of the Star Trek: The Next Generation television show episode Too Short a Season
- William Michaelian (born 1956), Armenian-American writer
