= Death of Luis Santos =

2008 murder near San Diego State University

- Location: San Diego State University, San Diego, California
- Date: October 4, 2008; 18 years ago
- Victim: 1 (Luis Santos)
- Perpetrators: Esteban Núñez, Rafael Garcia, Ryan Jett, and Leshanor Thomas

Luis Santos (Luis Felipe Watson dos Santos) (June 27, 1986 – October 4, 2008) was a 22-year-old Mesa College student who was fatally stabbed near San Diego State University campus on October 4, 2008.

== History ==
On October 4, 2008, Esteban Núñez, Rafael Garcia, Leshanor Thomas, and Ryan Jett got into an altercation with Luis Santos near San Diego State University, leading to Jett fatally stabbing Santos. Two other men who were there during the time of Santos's death were stabbed by Núñez, and a fourth man was punched in the face by Thomas. A trailer nearby was also vandalized. That same night, the four men drove back to Sacramento County, where they all resided, and disposed of all evidence of the crime. The men were arrested in December 2008 in Sacramento County, and driven back to San Diego County for booking.

At arraignment, Jett was held without bail due to two previous felonies, including gun charges, while Núñez, Garcia, and Thomas had their bail set at $2 million.

In May 2010, Núñez and Jett pleaded guilty to voluntary manslaughter and assault to get the murder charges dropped. Both were sentenced to 16 years in prison. On July 2, 2010, Garcia and Thomas were placed on probation for three years. Thomas pleaded guilty to assault with a deadly weapon and conspiracy to commit assault with a deadly weapon and Garcia pleaded guilty to conspiracy to destroy evidence.

Núñez was released from jail in April 2016 after having his sentence commuted by then Governor Arnold Schwarzenegger.

=== Suspected gang connections ===
There was speculation that Núñez, Garcia, Thomas and Jett were associated with The Hazard Crew, or THC based on both pictures and several statements made by the accused according to witness statements. Investigators included comments in the arrest warrant about the group belonging to a "close-knit group of friends who call themselves 'THC'." They specifically identified "186.22 PC Participating in a Criminal Gang" in the warrant. The crew identified with a biohazard icon, which all four of the men had tattooed on themselves.

Sacramento- area law enforcement had no prior knowledge of “THC,” and didn't believe they were engaging in gang activities. Though several of the men had been previously arrested on minor charges, Jett was the only one who was arrested on more serious gun charges.

County of San Diego District Attorney's office did not file any gang-related charges.

=== Legacy ===
In October 2012, Governor Jerry Brown signed a bipartisan bill that requires that the offender's victims and their families receive at least 10 days notice for any commutations.

=== Yes on Prop. 17 campaign ===
Proposition 17 was approved by voters in California during the November 2020 election. The proposition allows people convicted of felonies, but are out on parole, the ability to vote. This changed restored voting rights to about 50,000 parolees. Opponents of Prop. 17 claim that it is an injustice to victims of crime who must now watch their perpetrators be rewarded with the right to vote before they finish their full sentence.

Núñez was part of the Yes on Prop. 17 campaign. During his time behind bars, he claimed to have read three newspapers a day, and felt very up on current events by the time he left prison after his sentence was reduced by Arnold Schwarzenegger.

== Controversies ==
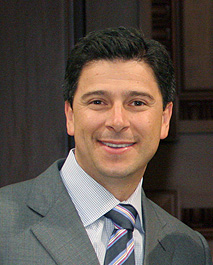
Fabian Núñez, 66th Speaker of the California State Assembly and father of one of the perpetrators

=== Fabian Núñez's influence ===
Esteban Núñez was 19-years-old at the time of the killing, and 21-years-old at the time of conviction. Núñez pleaded guilty to voluntary manslaughter and was sentenced to 16 years in prison. Núñez’s father, then California Assembly Speaker of the House, Fabian Núñez, was a close friend and staunch political ally of then governor Arnold Schwarzenegger. Fabian Núñez, his wife Maria, and his two other children flew down to San Diego to be with Esteban. He made a public statement stating "[w]e are confident our son Esteban will be cleared of the charges he is facing."

Witnesses stated that Esteban Núñez told his friends if they got in trouble that his father, Fabian Núñez, would get them off on self-defense.

When Esteban Núñez was first arrested, his father's political influence was evident as many letters pleading for a reduction in his son's $2-million bail were sent to the San Diego County Superior Court. One letter, on official stationery, came from Núñez's longtime friend, then Los Angeles Mayor Antonio Villaraigosa; one letter came on official stationery from Maria Elena Durazo, head of the L.A. County Federation of Labor; one came from California Assembly Republican Leader Michael Villines, and was sent by California State Assembly member Kevin de León. Ultimately, his bail was reduced to $1 million.

=== Commutation by Schwarzenegger ===
Just hours before he left office, and as one of his last official acts, Schwarzenegger commuted Núñez’s sentence by more than half, to seven years. Against protocol, Schwarzenegger did not inform Santos' family or the San Diego County prosecutors about the commutation. They learned about it in a call from a reporter. Justifying his commutation, he said, "I mean, of course you help a friend."

The Santos family, along with the San Diego district attorney, sued to stop the commutation, claiming that it violated Marsy's Law. In September 2012, Sacramento County superior court judge Lloyd Connelly stated, "Based on the evidentiary records before this court involving this case, there was an abuse of discretion ... This was a distasteful commutation. It was repugnant to the bulk of the citizenry of this state." However, Connelly ruled that Schwarzenegger remained within his executive powers as governor.

In April 2016, Esteban Núñez was released from Mule Creek State Prison, serving less than six years of his original 16-year sentence.
