= Fabian Núñez =

American politician (born 1966)

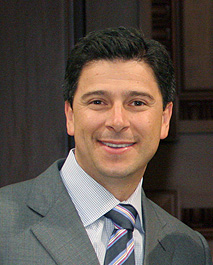

66th Speaker of the California State Assembly
- In office February 9, 2004 – May 13, 2008
- Preceded by: Herb Wesson
- Succeeded by: Karen Bass

Member of the California State Assembly from the 46th district
- In office December 2, 2002 – November 30, 2008
- Preceded by: Gil Cedillo
- Succeeded by: John Pérez

Personal details
- Born: December 27, 1966 (age 59) San Diego, California, U.S.
- Party: Democratic
- Relatives: Esteban Núñez (son)
- Education: Pitzer College (BA)
- Profession: Politician

Fabian Núñez (also transcribed variously as Fabián Núñez, Fabian Nuñez and Fabian Nunez; born December 27, 1966) is an American politician and labor union adviser. A member of the Democratic Party, he served three two-year terms as a member of the California State Assembly, leaving office in late 2008. During his last two terms, Núñez served as the 66th Speaker of the California State Assembly.

== Early life ==
Fabian Núñez is the tenth of twelve children. He was born in San Diego, California, to Mexican parents, but the family lived in Tijuana, Baja California, Mexico until Núñez was 7 years old. He spent the rest of his youth in the Logan Heights neighborhood of San Diego. His parents eventually became United States citizens. At the age of 31, Núñez earned Bachelor of Arts degrees in both political science and education from Pitzer College in Claremont, California.

From 1996 to 2000, Fabian Núñez served as the Political Director for the Los Angeles County Federation of Labor and, between 2000 and 2002, was the Government Affairs Director for the Los Angeles Unified School District.

== California State Assembly ==
Núñez was elected to the California State Assembly to represent the 46th district in 2002. Later, on February 9, 2004 he was selected as the Speaker of the California Assembly.

When Núñez was elected, the Los Angeles Times reported that he promised to "foster a spirit of bipartisanship in the Assembly ..." He was quoted saying, "We should reestablish this great legislative body as the house of ideas. And more importantly, we must work together for the benefit of all Californians." During his tenure as speaker, the San Francisco Chronicle editorialized that the 2005/2006 "legislative session represented one of the most productive in recent memory."

Throughout his term, Núñez authored several laws including a $1.25 increase in the minimum wage, and a measure to promote competition among cable television providers.

In August 2005, Núñez traveled to Mexico to meet with then-president of Mexico, Vicente Fox, other high level government officials, and business leaders. The declared purpose of his journey was to strengthen ties between Mexico and California that he claimed had deteriorated under California's governor, Arnold Schwarzenegger. At Núñez's invitation, president Fox eventually traveled to Sacramento and addressed a special joint session of the California State Legislature.

Núñez supported and advocated for the passage of the 2006 infrastructure bonds. He authored both the education (Proposition 1B) and water levee bond (Proposition 1D) in the Legislature. Former Assembly Speaker Bob Hertzberg spoke about Núñez' involvement with the passage of the bonds on May 17, 2006: "And ultimately credit goes to Speaker Fabian Núñez, who is a very keen legislator who understands how to put the pieces and parts together and see the big picture. He was instrumental in taking what was failure last time and putting it all together this time. Fabian is willing to work with all sides and wants to get things done."

Núñez passed a law in 2006 to establish a program to provide prescription drugs at discount prices to about five million uninsured and underinsured Californians. The new law will require the state department of Health Services to negotiate discounts with drug manufacturers. In 2006, he also authored AB 32, which was signed into law by Schwarzenegger. AB 32 created the nation's first cap on greenhouse gas emissions. The law set new regulations on the amount of emissions utilities, refineries and manufacturing plants are allowed to release into the atmosphere.

In 2007, Núñez was named "Public Official of the Year" by Governing Magazine. The magazine highlighted his legislative leadership and accomplishments:

Fabian Núñez doesn't think compromise is a dirty word. California's Assembly speaker has played a classic legislative leadership role as the bridge between Republican governor and a strongly liberal majority Democratic caucus, helping to forge and shepherd through a long list of impressive legislation over the past couple of years.
His personal scorecard includes a $40 billion infrastructure bond package, a $7 billion prison building and rehabilitation measure, and a landmark global-warming law that is already being imitated by other states. "Some people feel you can't compromise because you're setting your values aside," he continues. "I believe the opposite. You're fighting for your beliefs when you can move the ball forward."

On October 10, 2007, the Los Angeles Times reported that Núñez had allegedly spent tens of thousands of dollars of campaign money for personal expenses. However, October 27, 2009, Political Blotter reported that the FPPC had cleared Núñez of all accusations.

Due to term limits, Núñez had to retire from the Assembly after 2008. Starting in fall 2007, he actively campaigned in support of a statewide proposition to amend the term limits law, including being made eligible to serve an additional six years as speaker. This ballot measure, California Proposition 93 (2008), was widely seen as a power grab on the part of Núñez and Senate Majority Leader Don Perata. On February 5, 2008 election, a majority of California voters rejected Proposition 93. Núñez was succeeded by Karen Bass.

After serving as speaker of the Assembly, Núñez was named as co-chair of the Hillary Clinton 2008 presidential bid. He joined a national bipartisan public strategy firm, Mercury, as a partner managing the Sacramento and Los Angeles offices. Núñez also serves on the Board of Directors for the U.S Soccer Federation and previously serviced on the University of California Board of Regents.

In October 2008, Núñez's son Esteban and his friends provoked a fight where Luis Santos was murdered. Esteban admitted to stabbing two other students. In May 2010, Esteban entered into a plea agreement in which he pleaded guilty to voluntary manslaughter and was sentenced to 16 years in prison for the death of Santos. Núñez was a close friend and key political ally of then governor Arnold Schwarzenegger.

When Esteban Núñez was first arrested, his father used his influence to get him more favorable conditions. Letters pleading for a reduction in his son's $2-million bail were sent to the San Diego County Superior Court. One letter, on official stationery, came from Núñez's longtime friend, then Los Angeles Mayor Antonio Villaraigosa; one letter came on official stationery from Maria Elena Durazo, head of the Los Angeles County Federation of Labor; one came from California Assembly Republican Leader Michael Villines; and one was sent by California State Assemblyman Kevin de León. His bail was reduced to $1 million.

Just hours before he left office, Schwarzenegger commuted Esteban Núñez's sentence to seven years. The commutation, along with Schwarzenegger's failure to notify the family of the victim, outraged them who then tried to sue to stop the commutation but were unsuccessful. Subsequently, Schwarzenegger's successor Jerry Brown signed a bipartisan bill in 2011 requiring victims and their families to be given at least 10 days notice before prison sentence commutations. In April 2016, Esteban Núñez was released from Mule Creek State Prison after serving less than six years.

In 2010, Núñez filed paperwork to run for the California State Senate but withdrew. Núñez created a campaign finance committee and announced that he would run for California State Treasurer in 2014, when incumbent Bill Lockyer was termed out. Núñez formed an exploratory committee for California State Treasurer in 2018.

Núñez is currently a partner at the public relations and lobbying firm Actum.

== Newspaper profiles ==
- "On the rise", sacbee.com, February 7, 2004
- "Nuñez travels the world like a high-roller", Los Angeles Times, October 5, 2007
- How Núñez rose to power so fast -- Champion of Prop. 93, in Assembly only 5 years, had modest beginnings, sfgate.com

Political offices
Preceded by Herb Wesson	Speaker of the California State Assembly; February 9, 2004 – May 13, 2008	Succeeded by Karen Bass
Preceded by Wilma Chan	State Assembly Majority Whip; December 2, 2002 – February 9, 2004	Succeeded by Lloyd Levine
California Assembly
Preceded by Gil Cedillo	California State Assemblymember, 46th District; December 2, 2002 – November 30, 2008	Succeeded by John Pérez
