= SM Entertainment Square =

Street intersection in Los Angeles

- Interactive map of SM Entertainment Square

Location
- Koreatown, Los Angeles
- Coordinates: 34.0635°N 118.3078°W
- Roads at junction: 6th Street and Oxford Avenue

Construction
- Type: Intersection
- Maintained by: City of Los Angeles

SM Entertainment Square, also called SM Square, is the intersection of 6th Street and Oxford Avenue in the Koreatown district of Los Angeles. It was designated by Los Angeles City Council on October 28, 2020, in honor of SM Entertainment and its founder Lee Soo-man to recognize their achievement in the global music market by leading the K-pop industry.

== History ==
On October 28, 2020, the Los Angeles City Council designated the intersection of 6th Street and Oxford Avenue as "SM Entertainment Square." The intersection was named in honor of SM Entertainment and Lee Soo-man's accomplishments in the global music market by leading the K-pop industry. It was also done for their contributions to promoting Korean culture in Los Angeles. The naming of the intersection in honor of a Korean entertainment company marked the first time such an occurrence had happened. The intersection was expected to promote Korean culture and lifestyle as SM's entertainment space complex, SMT LA, was also scheduled to open.

Consul General Park Gyeong-jae said he hoped that the newly designated SM Entertainment Square would develop from LA, the "home of the film and cultural industry, to the center of the Korean entertainment industry" that fosters K-pop and Hallyu culture in the world. Moreover, Park stated that it is expected that the intersection will designate itself as a place where young people from all over the world would gather. Los Angeles City Councilman, Herb Wesson, expressed their "respect for the innovative contributions" that SM and Lee Soo-man had driven to the music industry while "leading K-pop onto the world stage." On April 28, 2022, signage referring to the intersection name was erected. The sign has a statement presenting Lee as a "pioneer of the Korean wave and global K-phenomenon."
