= Martin Ludlow =

American labor leader and politician (born 1964)

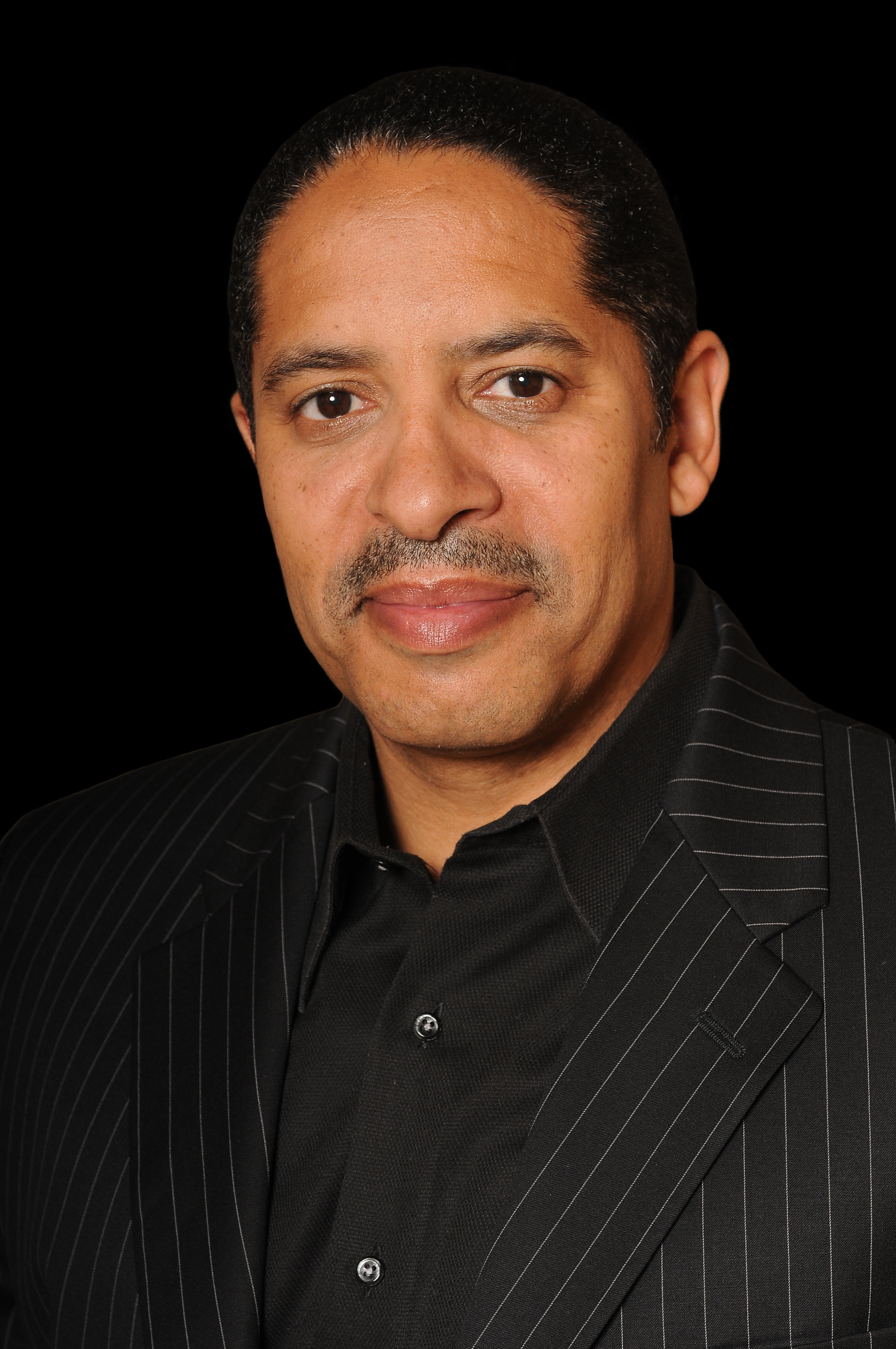
- Ludlow in 2013

Member of the Los Angeles City Council for the 10th district
- In office July 1, 2003 – June 30, 2005
- Preceded by: Nate Holden
- Succeeded by: Herb Wesson

Personal details
- Born: 1964 (age 61–62)
- Party: Democratic

Martin Ludlow (born 1964) is the president and chief executive officer of Bridge Street Inc. and a former member of the Los Angeles City Council for the 10th district.

Ludlow served on the Los Angeles City Council, representing the 10th district from July 1, 2003, through June 30, 2005, when he resigned and was elected head of the Los Angeles County Federation of Labor (County Fed). In 2006, Ludlow resigned as head of the County Fed and pleaded guilty in state and federal courts to charges that he had used union workers and union money to help his 2003 city council campaign.

== Biography ==
Ludlow was born in 1964 to a black father who served in the military and a white mother. He was placed in a foster home and named Marty. In 1965 he was adopted by a white couple, Willis Ludlow, a Methodist minister, and Anne Ludlow, a clerical worker; they renamed him Martin after Martin Luther King Jr. He was brought up in Idaho Falls and Pocatello, Idaho. The elder Ludlow ran for Congress in 1972; he won the Democratic nomination but lost the election by a wide margin.

Martin Ludlow vividly recalls the rallies and picket lines and sitting in church pews with his father, who died in 1998. His own activism, he now realizes, stems largely from the man who adopted him. "My father did it partly because he was an underdog," Ludlow said.

The Ludlow family moved from Idaho to Washington, D.C., Syracuse, New York, and finally to Oberlin, Ohio, in 1976. He attended Ohio State University but did not graduate. He moved to California and attended Santa Monica City College, then became an intern for U.S. Representative Julian Dixon, after which he worked with at-risk youth in the Los Angeles Conservation Corps. He was a field representative for the Service Employees International Union.

Ludlow is divorced.

== Political life ==
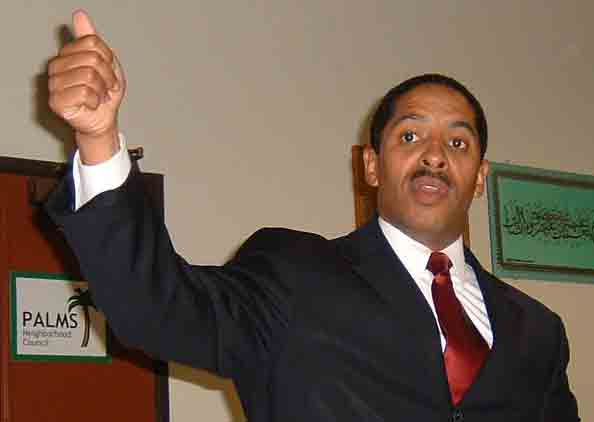
Ludlow as a councilman in 2006

In 1998, Ludlow became chief of staff to state Assembly Member Antonio Villaraigosa, and in 2001 he was named political director of the Los Angeles County Federation of Labor under the executive secretary, Miguel Contreras. In 2002 he became a member of the staff of Assembly member Herb Wesson.

With the backing of organized labor he won election to the City Council in May 2003 in a runoff election over Deron Williams by a 56-44 ratio. He was also endorsed by the Los Angeles Area Chamber of Commerce "and other business groups." He was sworn in for a term beginning July 1 by his mother, Anne, and Ethel Bradley, the widow of former Mayor Tom Bradley, in a public ceremony dedicated to Willis Ludlow.

During his time at the City Council, Ludlow worked to reduce gang violence in L.A., proposing the creation of a city department dedicated to gang intervention and prevention. During the summer of 2003, his district established a six-week program called "Summer of Success", which provided activities such as video games, soccer clinics, midnight basketball and dance classes in Baldwin Village, also known as "The Jungle". The Summer of Success series was successful in reducing gang violence and was later implemented by Mayor Antonio Villaraigosa in what was called "Summer Night Lights". Ludlow also became the head of the city's Convention, Tourism, Entertainment Industry and Business Enterprise Committee, created with the goal of "finding ways" to "make sure the film industry stays in Los Angeles."

Ludlow was appointed by Mayor James K. Hahn to the Los Angeles Metropolitan Transit Authority board, and in early 2004 it became known that he was the subject of an investigation into his relations with a firm that proposed to build a West Los Angeles transportation yard for a fleet of buses. No charges were filed.

In June 2005, Ludlow was appointed interim secretary-treasurer, the chief official, of the Los Angeles County Federation of Labor, as of July 1, and stated he would quit the City Council on June 30. He won the job permanently at a union election in June and proceeded to successfully fight the plans of Governor Arnold Schwarzenegger to limit the ability of public employee unions to collect political money from their members.

In February 2006, he announced that he would resign as a result of the criminal investigations into the financing of his City Council campaign, and news surfaced that a plea deal was being arranged. Ludlow said he would cooperate with federal, state and city investigators that claimed that the Service Employees International Union Local 99 illegally funneled $53,000 from labor union accounts into his 2003 race. He said in a statement:

It has been my joy, my honor, and my privilege to be a part of the most dynamic labor movement anywhere in the United States of America. However, as a result of errors in my judgment, I must take these steps to begin to accept full responsibility for the mistakes that I made."

== Post-conviction ==
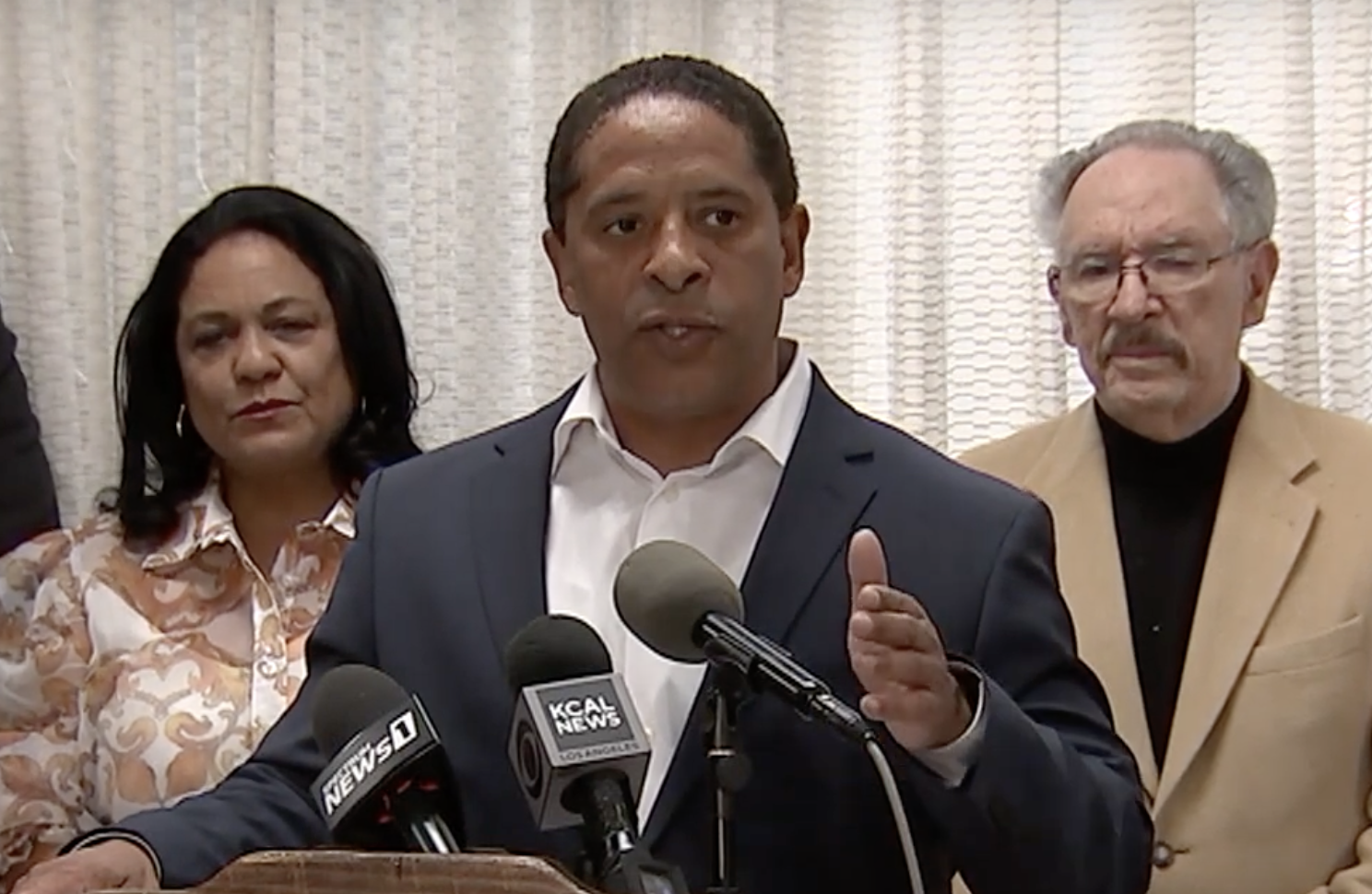
Ludlow with Councilwoman Heather Hutt and School Board member George J. McKenna III in 2023.

In April 2006, Los Angeles County Superior Court Judge David Horwitz sentenced Ludlow to three years' probation and $45,000 in fines and costs for conspiring to illegally divert school employees' union funds to his 2003 election campaign. Ludlow was banned from holding elected office for four years. In June of that year, federal Judge Manuel Real sentenced him to five years' probation and 2,000 hours of community service and ordered Ludlow to return $36,400 to the school employees' union. Ludlow was barred from serving in leadership position with any union for thirteen years. Ludlow had earlier been fined $105,000 by the Los Angeles City Ethics Commission for violating city campaign laws.

Ludlow's financial problems have resulted in a "warm embrace" by Los Angeles civic leaders, a Los Angeles Times article reported, including at least one fund-raiser dinner and other kinds of help.

"Why do I support him? L.A. needs him," said attorney Connie Rice, who was among 16 people, including actor Danny Glover and Rep. Diane Watson (D-Los Angeles), who were part of the "reception committee" at a recent fundraiser to benefit Ludlow. "The reason he's important is that he bridges every L.A. divide there is — whether it be racial, class, city, immigration. He is genuinely loved in every community."

In a critical editorial, though, the Times said that the fundraiser amounted to "a collective smirk to the people of Los Angeles," and the Los Angeles Daily News editorialized, "Astonishingly, Ludlow has gotten nothing but sympathy from the city's elite, as if he were the victim of wrongdoing and not a criminal."

In June 2008, Times columnist Kurt Streeter wrote that Ludlow had found "full redemption" through his volunteer work at Dorsey High School as a volunteer coaching assistant "working to keep kids on the straight path with his buzz saw energy, boundless optimism and a humility forged by the crucible of public humiliation."

In 2012, Johnathan Franklin, a member of the UCLA football team, cited Ludlow as his mentor, and the reason why he became interested in politics and public policy. He said, "The former Los Angeles City Councilman Martin Ludlow — he helped out at Dorsey and he became my mentor. I understood the things he did around the community and the impact that made."

Ludlow has volunteered as a strength and conditioning coach for kids in South Los Angeles and created a charity called Dorsey Football Boosters. His work as a coach and mentor was profiled in a June 22, 2008, LA Times feature titled "He makes a difference, finds redemption".

== Work with Bridge Street, Inc. ==
Ludlow founded live events-production company Bridge Street, Inc. in 2012. Bridge Street organizes concerts, rallies, festivals, and ceremonies that promote social-justice themes such as civil rights, advocacy for the poor, prison re-entry, and gang prevention.

In 2013, Ludlow and Bridge Street associate-produced the BET Experience concert series, and would go on to do so for the next several years. In 2018, Bridge Street produced the 50th Anniversary of Martin Luther King Jr.'s “Mountaintop Speech” in Memphis, TN, along with several associated events. In 2019, Bridge Street produced ObamaFest 2019, celebrating the renaming of Los Angeles's Rodeo Road to “Obama Boulevard.” Currently, Ludlow and Bridge Street are preparing to organize and host the inaugural Los Angeles Jazz Festival, originally billed as the largest in West Coast history, however most festival events were cancelled less than one week prior to the start of the event.

Preceded by Miguel Contreras	Executive Secretary – Treasurer, Los Angeles County Federation of Labor; 2005–06	Succeeded by Maria Elena Durazo
Preceded by Nate Holden	Los Angeles City Council; 10th District; 2003–05	Succeeded by Herb Wesson
