= Dinuba, California =

City in California, United States

- City
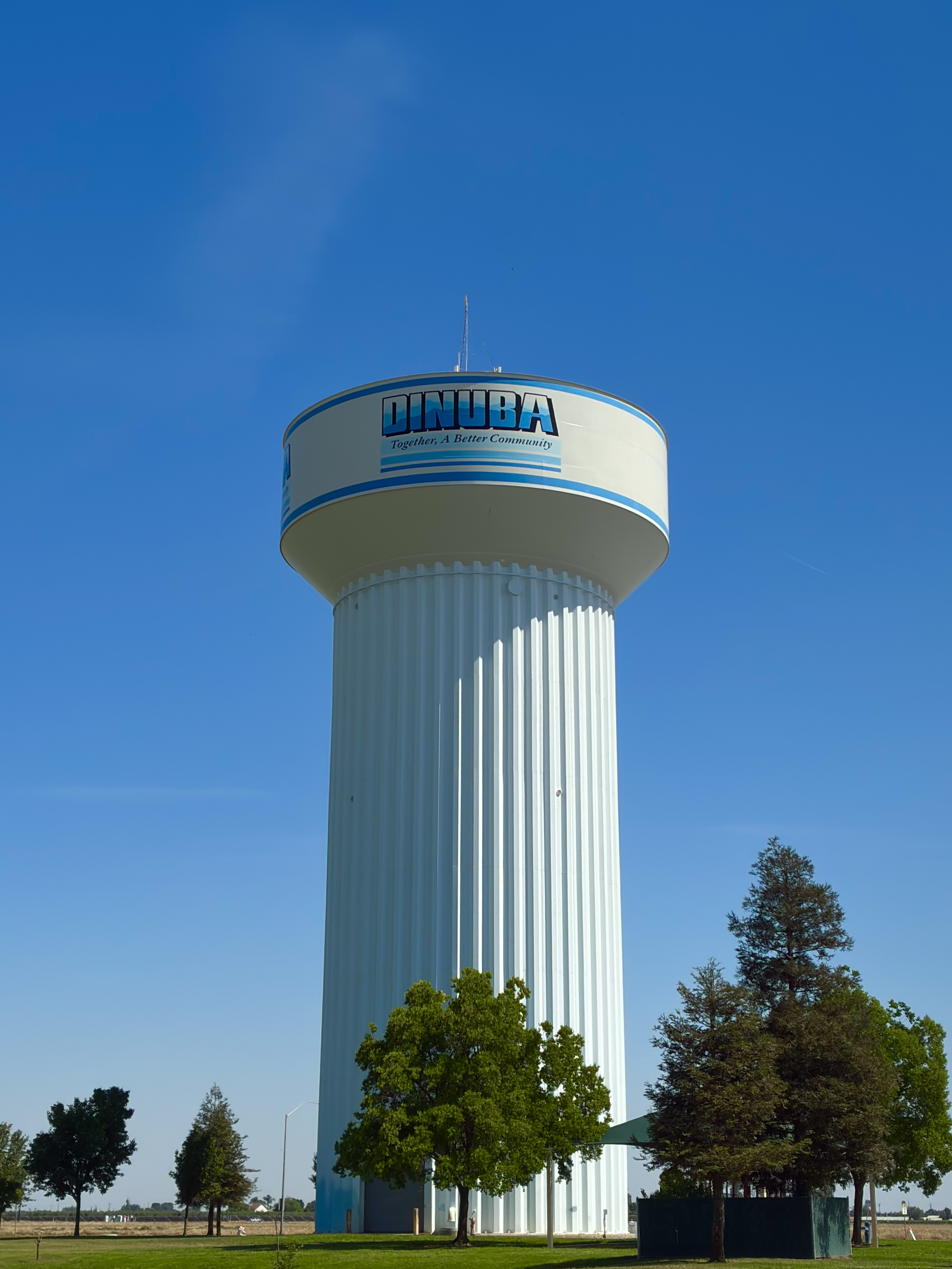
- Water tower on the western outskirts of Dinuba

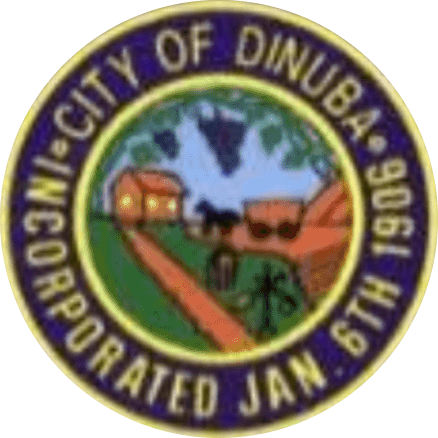
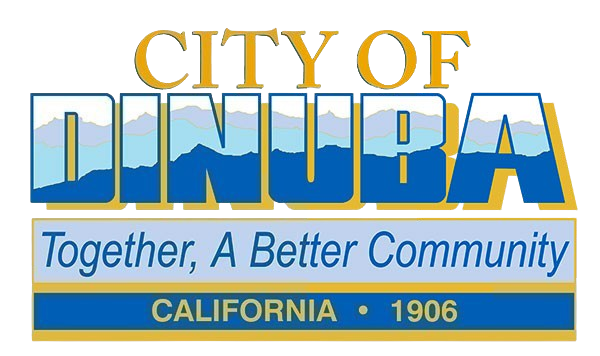
- Seal Logo
- Nicknames: Raisin City, Raisinland U. S. A., Dina
- Motto(s): Together, A Better Community
- Interactive map of Dinuba, California
- Location in the United States Location in California
- Coordinates: 36°32′42″N 119°23′21″W
- Country: United States
- State: California
- County: Tulare
- Incorporated: January 6, 1906

Government
  - Mayor: Rachel Nerio-Guerrero
  - Vice Mayor: Benjamin Prado

Area
  - Total: 6.51 sq mi (16.86 km^{2})
  - Land: 6.51 sq mi (16.86 km^{2})
  - Water: 0 sq mi (0.00 km^{2})
- Elevation: 335 ft (102 m)

Population (2020)
  - Total: 24,563
  - Density: 3,773.4/sq mi (1,456.92/km^{2})
- Time zone: UTC-8 (Pacific)
  - Summer (DST): UTC-7 (PDT)
- ZIP code: 93618
- Area code: 559
- FIPS code: 06-19318
- GNIS feature ID: 2410342
- Website: www.dinuba.org

Dinuba is a city in Tulare County, California, United States. The population was 24,563 at the 2020 census, up from 21,453 at the 2010 census. It is part of the Visalia-Porterville metropolitan statistical area. The Alta District Museum is located in Dinuba in a restored railroad station; the museum has a collection of materials that illustrate local history.

The name of the city is of unknown origin. Various theories about the origin exist, including that it is a misspelled reference to the Danubian people, who resisted the Romans in antiquity. It may instead be a fanciful name applied by railroad construction engineers at the time the branch line was built in this area. The city's original name was Sibleyville, named for James Sibley, who deeded 240 acres to the Pacific Improvement Company (Southern Pacific Company).

In the first quarter of the 20th century Dinuba had a sufficient Korean-American population to organize a parade supporting Korean independence from Japan on the second anniversary of the founding of the March 1st Movement in 1920.

== Geography ==
According to the United States Census Bureau, the city has a total area of 6.5 square miles (17 km^{2}), all land. The general topography is quite level ground, at an elevation of approximately 345 feet (105 m) above mean sea datum. The gradient is approximately ten feet per mile, from east-northeast to west-southwest. Groundwater generally also flows with the surface of the terrain; that is, from the northeast to the southwest. There are small hills to the northeastern side of Dinuba, with some elevations achieving heights of 526 feet (160 m).

== Demographics ==
Historical population
Census	Pop.	Note	%±
1910	970		—
1920	3,400		250.5%
1930	2,968		−12.7%
1940	3,790		27.7%
1950	4,971		31.2%
1960	6,103		22.8%
1970	7,917		29.7%
1980	9,907		25.1%
1990	12,743		28.6%
2000	16,844		32.2%
2010	21,453		27.4%
2020	24,563		14.5%
2024 (est.)	25,833	▲	5.2%
U.S. Decennial Census

=== 2020 census ===
As of the 2020 census, Dinuba had a population of 24,563 and a population density of 3,773.1 inhabitants per square mile (1,456.8/km^{2}). The median age was 29.7 years. For every 100 females, there were 98.3 males, and for every 100 females age 18 and over, there were 95.8 males. 98.7% of residents lived in urban areas, while 1.3% lived in rural areas.

The age distribution was 32.6% under the age of 18, 10.6% aged 18 to 24, 27.4% aged 25 to 44, 19.5% aged 45 to 64, and 9.9% aged 65 or older. The census reported that 99.4% of the population lived in households, 0.3% lived in non-institutionalized group quarters, and 0.3% were institutionalized.

There were 6,674 households, of which 54.9% had children under the age of 18. Of all households, 52.1% were married-couple households, 9.2% were cohabiting-couple households, 25.4% had a female householder with no spouse or partner present, and 13.4% had a male householder with no spouse or partner present. About 12.8% of all households were one-person households, and 6.4% had someone living alone who was 65 or older. The average household size was 3.66. There were 5,602 families (83.9% of all households).

There were 6,886 housing units at an average density of 1,057.8 units per square mile (408.4 units/km^{2}). Of these, 96.9% were occupied, 56.3% were owner-occupied, and 43.7% were renter-occupied. 3.1% of housing units were vacant; the homeowner vacancy rate was 1.1% and the rental vacancy rate was 2.4%.

Racial composition as of the 2020 census
Race	Number	Percent
White	5,868	23.9%
Black or African American	131	0.5%
American Indian and Alaska Native	446	1.8%
Asian	537	2.2%
Native Hawaiian and Other Pacific Islander	32	0.1%
Some other race	10,750	43.8%
Two or more races	6,799	27.7%
Hispanic or Latino (of any race)	21,599	87.9%

=== 2023 ACS estimates ===
In 2023, the US Census Bureau estimated that 23.9% of the population were foreign-born. Of all people aged 5 or older, 37.0% spoke only English at home, 62.2% spoke Spanish, 0.3% spoke other Indo-European languages, 0.2% spoke Asian or Pacific Islander languages, and 0.3% spoke other languages. Of those aged 25 or older, 73.4% were high school graduates and 13.6% had a bachelor's degree.

The median household income was $59,048, and the per capita income was $22,259. About 26.9% of families and 28.2% of the population were below the poverty line.

=== 2010 census ===
The 2010 United States census reported that Dinuba had a population of 21,453. The population density was 3,315.7 inhabitants per square mile (1,280.2/km^{2}). The racial makeup of Dinuba was 11,166 (52.0%) White, 141 (0.7%) African American, 193 (0.9%) Native American, 454 (2.1%) Asian, 17 (0.1%) Pacific Islander, 8,630 (40.2%) from other races, and 852 (4.0%) from two or more races. Hispanic or Latino of any race were 18,114 persons (84.4%).

The Census reported that 21,291 people (99.2% of the population) lived in households, 77 (0.4%) lived in non-institutionalized group quarters, and 85 (0.4%) were institutionalized.

There were 5,593 households, out of which 3,275 (58.6%) had children under the age of 18 living in them, 3,162 (56.5%) were opposite-sex married couples living together, 1,077 (19.3%) had a female householder with no husband present, 481 (8.6%) had a male householder with no wife present. There were 544 (9.7%) unmarried opposite-sex partnerships, and 37 (0.7%) same-sex married couples or partnerships. 672 households (12.0%) were made up of individuals, and 324 (5.8%) had someone living alone who was 65 years of age or older. The average household size was 3.81. There were 4,720 families (84.4% of all households); the average family size was 4.04.

The population was spread out, with 7,495 people (34.9%) under the age of 18, 2,476 people (11.5%) aged 18 to 24, 5,881 people (27.4%) aged 25 to 44, 3,920 people (18.3%) aged 45 to 64, and 1,681 people (7.8%) who were 65 years of age or older. The median age was 27.2 years. For every 100 females, there were 103.3 males. For every 100 females age 18 and over, there were 101.4 males.

There were 5,868 housing units at an average density of 906.9 units per square mile (350.2 units/km^{2}), of which 3,176 (56.8%) were owner-occupied, and 2,417 (43.2%) were occupied by renters. The homeowner vacancy rate was 2.3%; the rental vacancy rate was 4.2%. 11,975 people (55.8% of the population) lived in owner-occupied housing units and 9,316 people (43.4%) lived in rental housing units.

== Politics ==
In the California State Legislature, Dinuba is in the 16th senatorial district, represented by Democrat Melissa Hurtado, and in the 33rd Assembly district, represented by Republican Alexandra Macedo.

In the United States House of Representatives, Dinuba is in California's 21st congressional district, represented by Democrat Jim Costa.

== Economy ==
Dinuba is home to the Mexican food company Ruiz Foods, which received a visit from then President George W. Bush in October 2003 to commemorate its 40th anniversary. .

=== Top employers ===
According to Dinuba's 2025 Annual Comprehensive Financial Report, the top employers in the city are:

#	Employer	# of Employees
1	Ruiz Foods	1,400
2	Dinuba Public Schools	753
3	Best Buy	491
4	Walmart	430
5	City of Dinuba	194
6	Patterson Dental	160
7	Superior Grocers	90
8	United Market	48
9	Ross	45
10	Dinuba Lumber	37

== Education ==
Most of Dinuba is served by the Dinuba Unified School District while a section is within the Kings Canyon Unified School District.

== Notable people ==
- Stephen H. Burum, cinematographer
- Cruz Bustamante, 45th Lieutenant Governor of California
- Miguel Contreras, farmworker, organizer with the United Farm Workers Union and Labor Leader
- Bryce Seligman DeWitt, theoretical physicist, author of seminal work in quantum gravity
- Ike Frankian, American football player
- Ester Hernandez, an artist of the Chicano Movement
- Dylan Lee, relief pitcher for the Atlanta Braves
- Earl Kim, Korean-American composer
- Russ Letlow, NFL player for the Green Bay Packers
- Doris Matsui, member of the United States House of Representatives
- William Michaelian, novelist, short story writer, poet
- Manuel Muñoz, short story writer
- Oswald Hope Robertson, founder of the world's first blood bank
- Burt Rutan, founder of Scaled Composites, designer of the Voyager aircraft and SpaceShipOne
- Dick Rutan, military aviator and record-breaking test pilot
- Claramae Turner, opera singer, film actress
- Rose Ann Vuich, California's first female State Senator

== Sister cities ==
- Uruapan, Mexico
- Malsch, Germany
