= Herb Wesson =

American politician (born 1951)

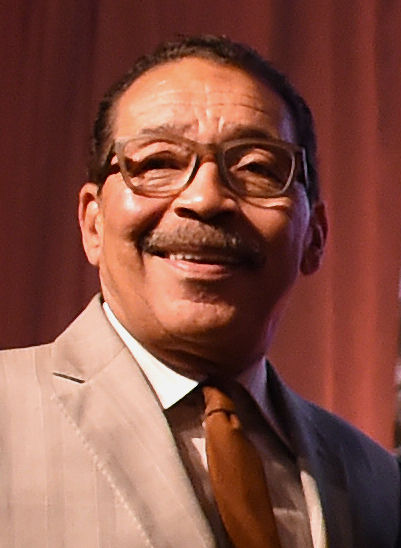
- Wesson in 2017

President of the Los Angeles City Council
- In office January 12, 2012 – January 5, 2020
- Preceded by: Eric Garcetti
- Succeeded by: Nury Martinez

Member of the Los Angeles City Council from the 10th district
- In office March 17, 2022 – August 25, 2022
- Preceded by: Mark Ridley-Thomas
- Succeeded by: Heather Hutt
- In office July 1, 2005 – December 14, 2020
- Preceded by: Martin Ludlow
- Succeeded by: Mark Ridley-Thomas

65th Speaker of the California State Assembly
- In office February 6, 2002 – February 9, 2004
- Preceded by: Robert Hertzberg
- Succeeded by: Fabian Núñez

Member of the California State Assembly from the 47th district
- In office December 7, 1998 – December 6, 2004
- Preceded by: Kevin Murray
- Succeeded by: Karen Bass

Personal details
- Born: Herman J. Wesson Jr. November 11, 1951 (age 74) Cleveland, Ohio, U.S.
- Party: Democratic
- Spouse: Fabian
- Children: 4
- Education: Lincoln University (BA)
- Website: www.herbwesson.com
- Herb Wesson's voice Herb Wesson on his tenure in the Los Angeles City Council; Recorded December 24, 2019

Herman J. "Herb" Wesson Jr. (born November 11, 1951) is an American politician who served as a councilmember representing the 10th District for three terms between July 1, 2005 and December 14, 2020, and again on an appointed basis from March 22, 2022 until August 25, 2022. He was also the President of the Los Angeles City Council and Speaker of the California State Assembly.

== Early life and career ==
Wesson was born in Cleveland, Ohio, on November 11, 1951. He has one younger brother.

He received his undergraduate degree in history from Lincoln in 1999, where he was initiated as a member of Alpha Phi Alpha fraternity.

Before his term in the California State Assembly, Wesson was the chief of staff of former Los Angeles City Council Member Nate Holden and in the same position for former Los Angeles County Supervisor Yvonne Burke. After being termed out of the Assembly, he became a senior adviser and special assistant to Burke. He is a member of the Democratic Party.

=== Family ===
Wesson and his wife, Fabian, have four children.

== State Assembly (1998–2004) ==
Wesson served in the California State Assembly, representing the 47th district from 1998 until 2004. He was unanimously elected Speaker of the California State Assembly in January 2002 and served in the role until February 2004. He was the second African-American to be elected Speaker of the California Assembly. His legislative agenda focused on education, environmental protection and healthcare.

== City Council (2005–2020; 2022) ==
On November 8, 2005, Wesson was elected with almost 80% of the vote to represent the 10th Council District in the Los Angeles City Council, in a special election to fill the vacancy created when Martin Ludlow resigned. The 10th Council District is located in central and South Los Angeles, and includes the neighborhoods of Koreatown, Little Bangladesh, West Adams, Jefferson Park, Wilshire Center, South Robertson, Arlington Heights, Leimert Park, Faircrest Heights, Gramercy Park and parts of Baldwin Hills.

Wesson won a full term in March 2007 with 99.7% of the vote. He was reelected in 2011 and again in 2015.

In 2022, he was appointed by City Council President Nury Martinez to replace Mark Ridley-Thomas for the 10th district seat after the Ridley-Thomas was indicted on a federal corruption case. He was sworn in on Tuesday, February 22, but was blocked from participating as a council member until March 17 by Judge Mary H. Strobel. Strobel declined to extend the restraining order against Wesson on March 17, 2022, meaning Wesson was cleared to attend council meetings. After California Attorney General Rob Bonta granted the activists to have a lawsuit, Wesson was again blocked from acting as councilman in July 2022 after Strobel blocked him again, though she did not remove him from the post. On August 22, 2022, Mitchell Beckloff granted a preliminary injunction that barred Wesson from serving until a trial about his appointment as held. On August 25, 2022, Wesson resigned as councilmember.

=== Economic development ===
In July 2015 he created a committee to address how Los Angeles could be more business-friendly.

Some of the developments in the 10th Council District during Wesson's term have been Midtown Crossing, Kaiser Permanente Baldwin Hills/Crenshaw Medical Offices, and Cumulus.

=== Race relations ===
On October 20, 2016 Wesson announced the creation of embRACE L.A., a program to engage Angelenos in a conversation on race, ethnicity and diversity. He partnered with Councilmember Mitch O'Farrell to create the program. On April 25, 2017 Wesson invited over 20 members of the community to dinner at his home to discuss embRACE L.A. and race in Los Angeles.

=== Olympic bid ===
Wesson chaired the City Council's Ad Hoc Committee on the 2024 Summer Olympics. On January 25, 2017 he voted in favor of final approval of L.A.'s Host City Bid. Following the news that L.A. would bid on the 2028 Olympic and Paralympic Games, Wesson and the City Council voted unanimously in favor of the new proposal. On September 13, 2017, Los Angeles was officially named as the host of the 2028 Olympic and Paralympic Games.

=== Immigration ===
On December 19, 2016, the City Council created a $10 million fund to provide legal assistance for Los Angeles residents facing deportation

On January 20, 2017, Wesson was part of the City Council action that approved the hiring of an "immigrant advocate". On April 20, 2017 Peter Schey was appointed to the position. In April 2017, Wesson welcomed a delegation of governors from Mexico to discuss the relationship between Los Angeles and Mexican states. He concluded the dialogue by making each member of the delegation an honorary citizen in the City of Los Angeles.

=== Controversy ===
On October 24, 2019 the Los Angeles Times wrote a story accusing Wesson's son of receiving discounts on his rent at an L.A. apartment building. Rent records showed that over the years, the building had increased rent for the nearly all of its tenants except Wesson's son. Separately, Herb Wesson had helped the building's owners win approval of a controversial high-rise.

=== Community initiatives ===
==== Camping ====
Every year Wesson, in partnership with the City of Los Angeles Department of Recreation and Parks, treats approximately 150 children from disadvantaged communities to a camping trip at Hansen Dam.

==== Movies in the Park ====
Each summer Wesson hosts several screenings in the 10th Council District of various family-friendly films. Dubbed "Movies in the Park", the series provides a fun and safe environment for all ages. In addition to the movie screenings, Wesson provides all attendees with a meal, drink, popcorn, candy and a raffle drawing. Each year, the series sees thousands of attendees across the four film screenings.

==== Winter Wonderland ====
Wesson's Winter Wonderland includes a tobogganing course made from real snow, holiday themed arts and crafts, lunch and an appearance from Santa Claus. Wesson also gives toys to all attendees and raffles off larger prizes such as bicycles. In December 2015 Wesson gave computers to 350 families.

== Post-Council career ==
=== Los Angeles County Board of Supervisors election ===
In the 2020 election cycle, Wesson ran to succeed Supervisor Mark Ridley-Thomas in the County's 2nd district. State Senator Holly Mitchell defeated Wesson, earning just over 60% of the vote.
