= David S. Cunningham Jr. =

American businessman and politician

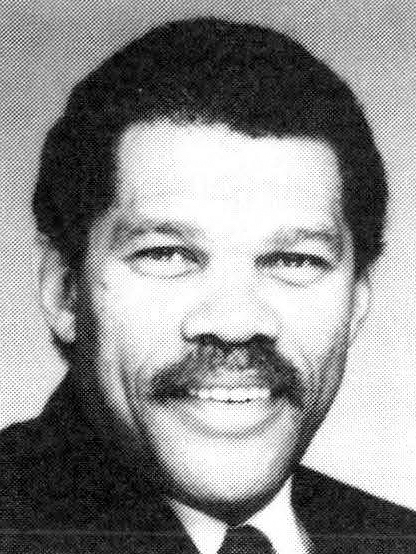
- Official portrait, 1986

Member of the Los Angeles City Council from the 10th District
- In office September 18, 1973 – September 30, 1986
- Preceded by: Tom Bradley
- Succeeded by: Nate Holden

Personal details
- Born: David Surmier Cunningham Jr. June 24, 1935 Chicago, Illinois, U.S.
- Died: November 15, 2017 (aged 82) Los Angeles, California, U.S.
- Party: Democratic
- Spouse(s): Bessie Marie (divorced); La Fern (divorced); Sylvia Kapel (m. 1977)
- Children: 6, including David III

David Surmier Cunningham Jr. (June 24, 1935 – November 15, 2017) was a business executive who was elected to the Los Angeles City Council to replace Tom Bradley, who had been elected mayor that year. He represented the 10th district until 1987, when he resigned.

== Biography ==
Cunningham was born in Chicago, Illinois, to Eula Mae Lawson Cunningham and David S. Cunningham Sr. He received an associate degree from Stowe Teachers College in St. Louis, Missouri, and was in the U.S. Air Force as a cartographer until 1960. He earned a bachelor's degree in political science and economics from the University of California, Riverside, in 1962; the following year he did an internship with the Coro Foundation internship program in Public Affairs after which he served as Administrative Aide to Assemblyman Charles Warren while attending Loyola Law School in Los Angeles. Subsequently, he then moved to Lagos, Nigeria, to become West Africa regional manager for the DuKane Corporation. After leaving Nigeria after 2 years, he was manager of community relations for Hughes. In 1968 in concert with Ted Short, they founded the Los Angeles consulting firm of Cunningham Short and Associates. In 1969, Ron Berryman join the firm renaming the consulting group Cunningham Short Berryman and Associates. 1972 David Cunningham earned a master's degree in urban studies from Occidental College.

He and his first wife, Bessie Marie, had a son— David III. With his second wife, LaFern, Leslie June and Robyn Elaine were born. He lived in Baldwin Hills, which was outside the 10th District, until June before his 1973 campaign for City Council, when he moved into an apartment in the district.

In 1977, he married Sylvia Kapel.

He was vice president of Cunningham, Short, Berryman and Associates, a consulting firm specializing in governmental and economic problems before his election to the City Council.

A government center on west Washington Boulevard is named David S. Cunningham Jr. Multi-service Senior Center in his honor. He was president of the board of directors of the UC Riverside Alumni Association in 2010–11.

He died on November 15, 2017, at Kaiser Permanente Hospital in Los Angeles.

He was preceded in death by his sisters, Nancy Jane (Cunningham) Freeman and Elnora (Cunningham) Hammond. He was survived by one brother, Ronald, his wife, Sylvia; three sons, David Surmier III, Sean Kingsley, and Brian Alexander, three daughters, Leslie June, Robyn Elaine, and Amber Brittany.

== City Council ==
=== Elections ===
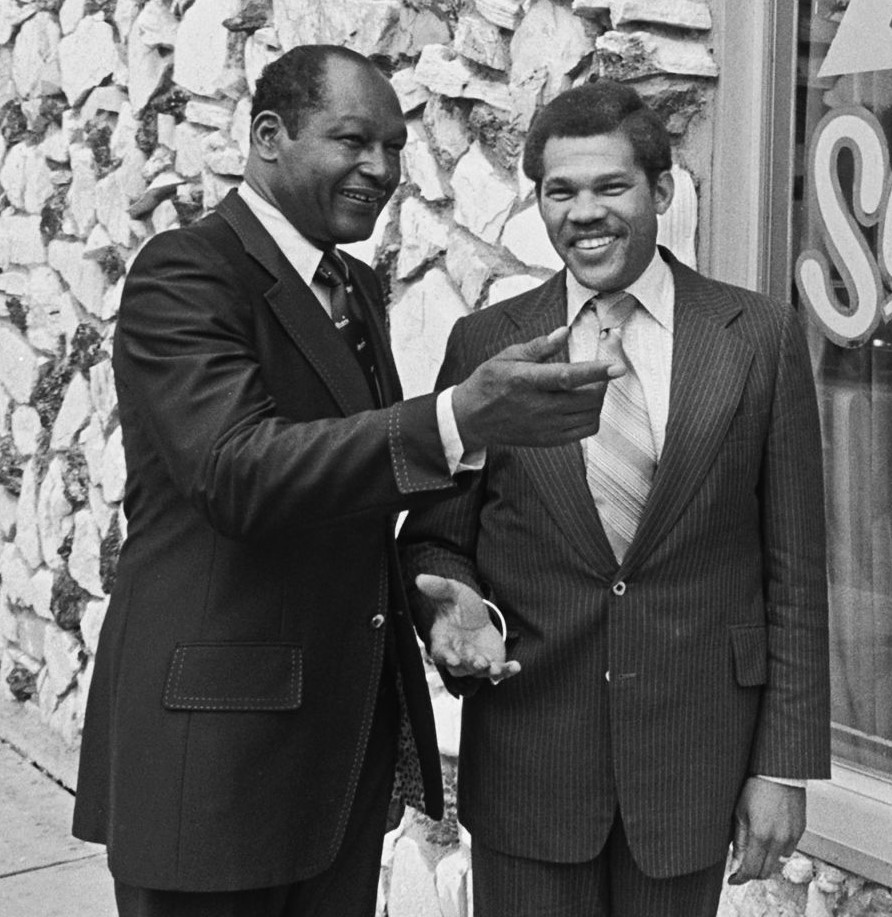
Cunningham with his predecessor Tom Bradley in 1978.

In 1973, Cunningham, 38, was endorsed by Mayor Bradley for the latter's old seat on the City Council in a special election held on September 18, 1973, his chief opponents being Herbert Carter, 40, former executive secretary of the Los Angeles County Commission on Human Relations and actor George Takei, 36, "familiar to many voters through his role of Sulu on television's 'Star Trek'" series. Other candidates included Juanita Dudley, 43, former assistant regional director of the Urban League; Jordan Daniels Jr., 48, former administrative assistant to Assemblyman Henry Waxman, and Joseph Evanns, 35, a patent attorney.

The results of the election, in which only a plurality was needed to win, were Cunningham, 8,199 votes; Takei, 6,552; Daniels, 2,412, and the others trailing. Cunningham reported spending $62,766 in the campaign, compared with Takei's reported $31,228, and Porter's $26,365. His major reported contributor was Lloyd Rigler, whose food company, Adolphs, gave $3,000.

When he ran for re-election in 1975, he was described as "on his way to becoming the City Council's most prominent liberal." He got "consistently high marks from clean-air groups, and he has publicly battled for fluoridated water and a ban on oil drilling in Santa Monica Bay. He has also suggested the city cut off funding to the Los Angeles Unified School District unless it desegregates its schools." He was opposed by Warren Bradley, 49, a businessman, and Douglas MacMillan, a civil engineer. The results were Cunningham, 3,571 votes; Bradley, 1,621, and MacMillan, 648.

Warren Bradley filed petitions with 5,936 signatures seeking Cunningham's recall in December 1975, based, among other things, on Cunningham's backing of fluoridation in city water and "support of neighborhood half-way houses in the district for convicts and drug addicts." Only 2,472 signatures were proved valid, and the recall effort failed.

In 1978, Cunningham ran for the "hotly contested" 28th Congressional District seat against Assemblyman Julian C. Dixon and State Senator Nate Holden. He lost the Democratic primary to Dixon, who had 42,350 votes; Holden, 29,588; Mayor Merle Hergell of Inglewood, 6,457; and Cunningham, 5,255.

Holden and Cunningham again opposed each other in 1979, when Holden challenged the incumbent councilman for his 10th District seat. Cunningham won by 9,116 votes (51.6 percent) to 7,505 (42.5 percent).

=== Activities ===
In March 1976, Cunningham and City Councilman Arthur K. Snyder narrowly averted fisticuffs "in an explosive climax to a debate over assistance to small and minority businesses in the city." The two council members swore at each other but were separated by the council's sergeant-at-arms.

In September 1976, Cunningham withdrew a proposal he had submitted that his press relations and public affairs be handled by a new firm whose members included a former aide of his and two other ex-city employees. City Clerk Rex E. Layton said he had "never seen that type of contract before at City Hall."

Cunningham became involved in a "nose-to-nose confrontation" with Councilman Louis Nowell in the City Council chamber in March 1977 after the council, by a vote of 8–4, passed a resolution against "forced busing" in Los Angeles, the practice of transporting schoolchildren far from their homes for the purpose of racial desegregation. He assailed the majority as "stupid" and called them "white bastards." He called Nowell "the greatest racist in the world" and told the San Fernando Valley councilman, who was campaigning to become city controller, that "I'll give you all the trouble you can take if you do get elected. . . . you hate me simply because I'm black." A resolution of censure against Cunningham was proposed by Nowell at a later meeting; it was referred to a committee.

Cunningham agreed to pay $1,178 to the city in December 1977 when it was discovered that Beverly Hills publicist Leonard Herring had been placing telephone calls from his home telephone on behalf of a fund-raising dinner and charging them to Cunningham's City Hall number. Cunningham denied he had given permission.

The councilman was said to have gained new "clout," or influence, when the City Council adopted a "trail-blazing" policy calling for its Grants, Housing and Community Development Committee, chaired by Cunningham, to oversee the distribution of millions of dollars in federal and state housing grants. Cunningham was able to sponsor a $500-a-plate fund-raising dinner, which "gained him entry into an exclusive council club consisting only of Arthur K. Snyder and Zev Yaroslavsky, the only other council members who have charged that much for an event." He later gave $60,000 of his campaign funds to the war chest of his ally, Mayor Bradley.

In August 1986, an investigative report by the Los Angeles Times listed Cunningham as third on a list of City Council members who had received campaign contributions from investment bankers and bond lawyers, a total of $29,200 after $36,600 to Gilbert Lindsay and $31,450 to John Ferraro. The Times cited a "growing link between city politics and the bond business." Cunningham resigned from the City Council on September 30, 1986, and went to work for Cranston Securities Company as a vice president on October 15.

Preceded by Tom Bradley	Los Angeles City Council; 10th District; 1973–87	Succeeded by Nate Holden
