= David S. Cunningham III =

David Surmier Cunningham III is a California attorney. He serves as Los Angeles County Superior Court Judge in multiple assignments in family law, probate and in complex civil assignments presiding over products liability cases, labor related class actions and mass torts. He was appointed to the court by Gov. Arnold Schwarzenegger on January 22, 2009.

== Early life ==
Cunningham is the son of David S. Cunningham Jr., a Los Angeles City Council member from 1973 to 1987, and the former Bessie M. Cosey (Tiki).

Cunningham graduated with his B.A. degree in Economics from the University of Southern California (USC) in 1977. He was awarded a Root-Tilden-Kern Scholarship by the New York University School of Law and graduated with a Juris Doctor degree from the school in 1980.

== Career ==
In the fall of 1980, Judge Cunningham was admitted to the New York State Bar and began his legal career as an attorney in the Honors Program with the United States Department of Justice, Civil Rights Division, Voting Rights Section in Washington, D.C. He worked on the redistricting plan for the Texas House of Representatives and tried several voting rights cases throughout the South. His work aided Congress in its decision to extend the Voting Rights Act another 25 years in 1982.

In 1983, upon returning to California, Cunningham was admitted to the California State Bar and served as a judicial clerk for the Hon. Terry J. Hatter, Jr. of the United States District Court for the Central District of California. In 1984, he joined the Beverly Hills Office of Finley Kumble Heine Underberg Manley & Casey as an associate. From 1987 to 1991, while simultaneously developing his practice, he taught financial institutions and trial advocacy courses at Loyola Law School.

In the early nineties, Cunningham grew his public law practice by representing municipal entities, redevelopment agencies, the Los Angeles Airport, the LA World Port Authority, Southern California Edison and public utilities. In the new millennium, Judge Cunningham joined the California based law firm of Meyers Nave Riback Silver & Wilson as a principal, specializing in eminent domain, real estate related matters and public law.

Cunningham also served as a police commissioner for the Los Angeles Police Department from 2001 to 2005. It was a challenging time for the City of Los Angeles, coming on the heels of the worst corruption scandal in the history of the Department, a rise in crime, and federal scrutiny of the city's policing practices. He served four years, becoming its president in 2003. In 2003, he was arrested by University of California at Los Angeles police during a traffic stop. The university subsequently settled the judge's lawsuit by paying $150,000 to Cunningham and his lawyer and $350,000 for scholarships.

Cunningham continued his academic interest in the law serving as an adjunct professor since 2015 at the University of Southern California, Gould Law School, periodically teaching evidence to second and third year students. From 2016 to 2019, he served on the Executive Board of the California Judges Association.

In January 2023, he assigned a lawsuit by Taylor Swift fans against Ticketmaster to trial judge Lawrence P. Riff.
