= Ruiz Foods =

Company based in the state of California, United States

Ruiz Foods is an American food production and service company based in Frisco, Texas, founded in 1964 by Louis Flores Ruiz and his son, Fred. Under the brand names of El Monterey and Tornados it produces around 200 frozen Mexican foods for grocery stores throughout the US and Canada. These foods include burritos, taquitos, enchiladas, and tamales. Ruiz Foods employs over 4,000 people across California, Texas, and South Carolina. Its 2022 revenue was over $1 billion.

== History ==
Louis and Fred Ruiz started Ruiz Foods in a small Tulare County warehouse in 1964. Selling cheese and onion enchiladas based on Louis' wife Rosie recipes, the operation grew into several products under the El Monterey brand.

In 1983, the Ruiz family were given the Small Business Administration Business Persons of the Year award. By 1987, Ruiz Foods had a sales volume of $42 million and 534 employees.

As of April 2010, it was the top seller of frozen Mexican dishes in the US and Canada.

Ruiz Foods' main 300,000 sq ft (28,000 m^{2}) manufacturing facility meets the needs of the Eastern and Midwestern US with two more facilities in Texas. In 2023, the company completed the relocation of its corporate headquarters from Dinuba, California, to Frisco, Texas.
