= Miguel Contreras =

American labor union leader (1952–2005)

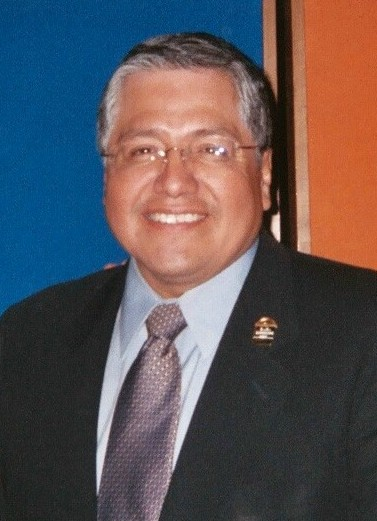
- Contreras in 2004
- Born: September 17, 1952; Dinuba, California
- Died: May 6, 2005 (aged 52); Los Angeles, California
- Occupation(s): Former Executive Secretary, Los Angeles County Federation of Labor, AFL–CIO
- Spouse: Maria Elena Durazo (m. 1988)
- Children: 2

Miguel Contreras (September 17, 1952 – May 6, 2005) was an American labor union leader. He "was known as a king-maker for both local and state politicians."

== Biography ==
Contreras was born in Dinuba, a city in California's Central Valley, to farmworker parents who had immigrated from Mexico during the 1920s under the Bracero Program.

After meeting Cesar Chávez at a rally for Robert F. Kennedy in the late 1960s, he became an activist for the United Farm Workers. He promoted the Delano Grape Boycott in Toronto, and organized lettuce workers in Salinas. He later led San Francisco hotel workers on a month-long strike. He was recruited by the Hotel Employees and Restaurant Employees Union, who made him a national organizer in Los Angeles. A contest over the leadership of the union's Local 11 led another labor leader, Maria Elena Durazo, to protest his involvement in the dispute. Durazo and Contreras later resolved their differences, and were married in 1988. The couple had one son, Michael.

In 1994 Contreras became political director of the Los Angeles County Federation of Labor, a central labor council of the American Federation of Labor. In 1996, he was elected executive secretary–treasurer of the Fed, a post he held until his death. During his tenure as secretary-treasurer, Contreras reached out to immigrant workers and worked to firmly integrate his union into the Los Angeles political landscape.

In 2000, Contreras led Los Angeles janitors in a strike against building owners that led to their winning a favorable contract. The campaign's success made it a model for the struggles of blue-collar workers nationwide. He was also a major figure in the transportation workers' strike of the same year, enlisting Jesse Jackson as a mediator in negotiations between the Los Angeles County Metropolitan Transportation Authority and the union. Significantly, Contreras put the County Fed's support behind that union even though it was not a member of the Fed; many saw his action as a way to build bridges between the large Latino membership in the Fed and the transit workers' largely African-American membership. He organized one of the largest immigrant-rights rallies in United States history, which drew some 20,000 people to the Los Angeles Sports Arena.

== Death and posthumous tributes ==
Contreras died from a heart attack on May 6, 2005. Initial reports about his death stated that he had died in his car after a series of meetings. A 2006 article in the LA Weekly determined that he died in a botánica in South Central Los Angeles. According to a 9-1-1 call made by an employee, Contreras died while he waited to have his fortune told.

A high school in Los Angeles, the Miguel Contreras Learning Complex, is named after him. In recognition, UC Berkeley and UCLA established the Miguel Contreras Labor Program (MCLP) to support labor education.

== Questions about death ==
An investigative report published by the LA Weekly said the location of Contreras' death, the Botánica Inca, was the veneer for a brothel. It was described as being "[not] even a storefront, but rather a series of nondescript back rooms, stuck behind a liquor store/video-rental shop and sealed off from the outside by a metal security door". Six months after his death, it was raided by the Los Angeles Police Department in a prostitution sting. Two women and one man were arrested on suspicion of prostitution and pimping respectively.

Contreras' body was transported to Centinela Freeman Regional Medical Center; no official autopsy was conducted. The LA Weekly said that union and city officials suppressed inquiries into the exact circumstances and causes of death. It said that Martin Ludlow, a Los Angeles city councilman, wanted to avoid an autopsy and engaged in a loud argument with hospital staff. Ludlow denied that he suppressed an autopsy. He also denied that Contreras' death was treated with unusual consideration by city and medical staff. Other officials present at the hospital in the immediate hours after Contreras' death, including Antonio Villaraigosa and James Hahn, refused to comment.

After publication of the report by the LA Weekly, Los Angeles County supervisor Michael D. Antonovich inquired with the Los Angeles County Coroner whether or not Contreras had been autopsied and, if not, why. "No one influenced us on whether or not to do an autopsy", the coroner replied. "Besides, his organs were harvested (for transplant), so there would not have been much point to an autopsy". They concluded that diabetes, high cholesterol, hypertension, and a family history of heart problems had contributed to his death. A spokesman for Antonovich said he was satisfied with their answer. The death was categorized by medical authorities as a "VIP death", which would be atypical for deaths in the area of Los Angeles where Contreras died.

Union officials told the Los Angeles Times that they were uninterested in learning about the details of Contreras' death. Instead, they wanted to remember him for his achievements on behalf of organized labor. His widow, Durazo, refused comment on the La Weekly report. Prior to its publication, she released a statement that said her family was still grieving for Contreras and that it was satisfied with the information released about his death. She also requested that journalists cease investigations into his death.

Friends and union supporters criticized the LA Weekly for its article. One of its columnists, Harold Meyerson, wrote an e-mail to the paper's staff that questioned the connection between Contreras' private life and his public career. Alan Mittelstaedt, the editor of the LA Weekly, replied that "the mystery of [Contreras'] final hours and the questions it raises about the performance of a crucial public institution—the coroner's office—[were] too important to ignore".
