= Labor 411 =

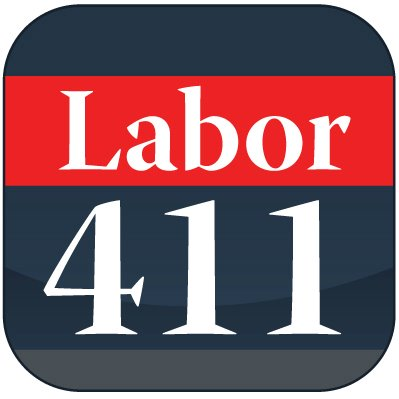
- Founded: 2008
- Founder: Cherri Senders
- Type: Private
- Product: Directories
- Affiliations: Los Angeles County Federation of Labor, AFL–CIO
- Website: www.labor411.org

Labor 411 is a research organization that produces national as well as city-specific directories of union-made goods and services in the United States. It is one of the largest directories of union-made goods and services in the country.

== History ==
Cherri Senders founded Labor 411 and has been its publisher since 2008. The site's directories guide users to providers of items that are union-made, segregated into different categories of goods and services. The purpose of the organization is to support the Buy American movement and raise awareness of what goods or services qualify as American and union-made. Labor 411 produces annual, city-specific directories for Los Angeles, Philadelphia, San Francisco, and Washington D.C. Labor 411 also regularly produces topical "buy union" guides around such events as the Super Bowl, summer recreation, and the holiday shopping season.

== Affiliations ==
The organization is affiliated with the Los Angeles Federation of Labor, the chartered Central Labor Council (CLC) of the AFL–CIO in Los Angeles County. They also run the Labor 411 Foundation, which advocates for workers' rights and leads public awareness campaigns regarding issues like wages and hours restrictions.
