= Nate Holden =

American politician (1929–2025)

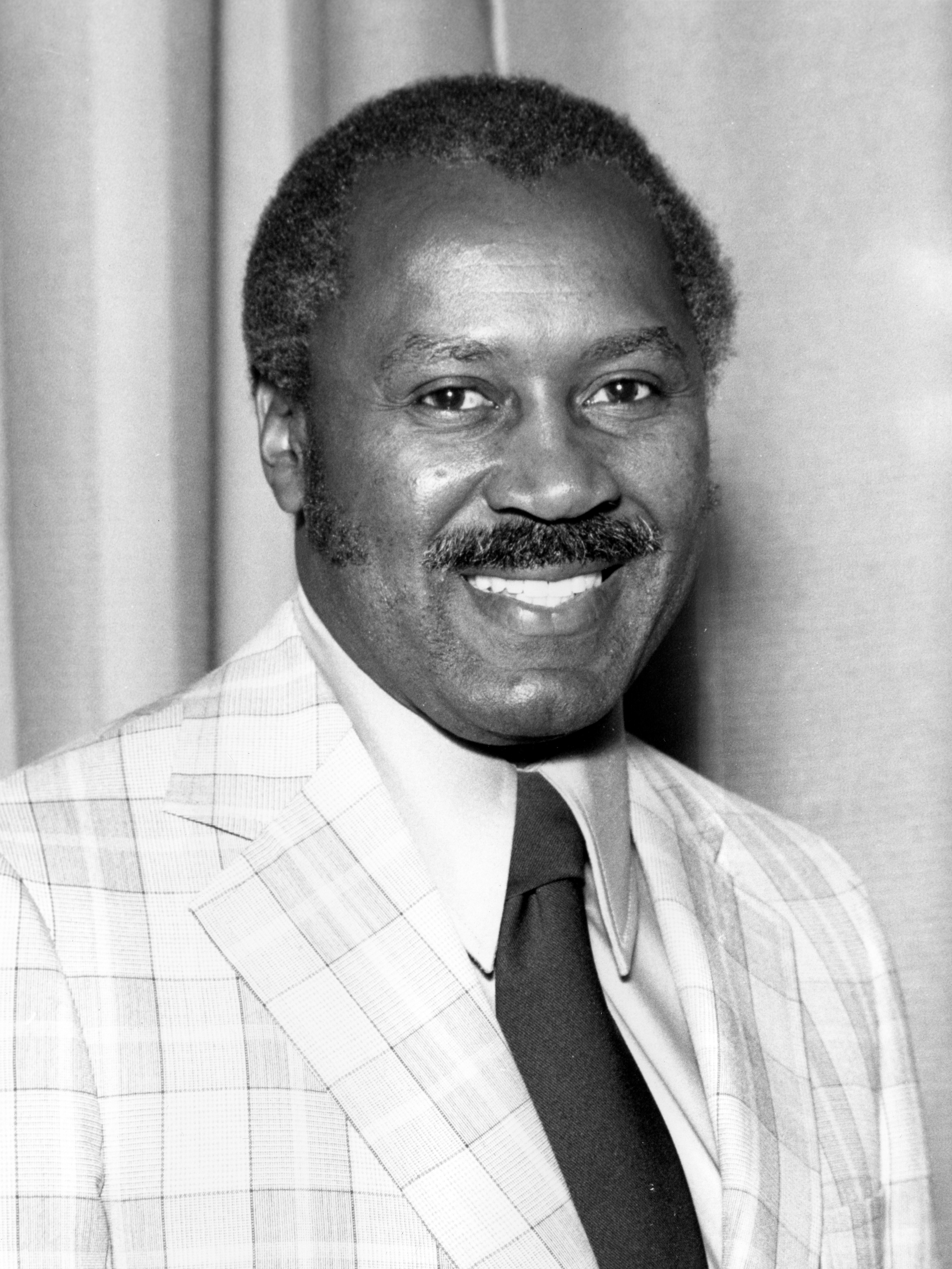
- Official portrait, 1975

Member of the Los Angeles City Council from the 10th district
- In office July 1, 1987 – June 30, 2003
- Preceded by: David Cunningham
- Succeeded by: Martin Ludlow

Member of the California Senate from the 30th district
- In office December 2, 1974 – November 30, 1978
- Preceded by: Lawrence E. Walsh
- Succeeded by: Diane Watson

Personal details
- Born: June 19, 1929 Macon, Georgia, U.S.
- Died: May 7, 2025 (aged 95) Santa Monica, California, U.S.
- Party: Democratic
- Children: Reggie and Chris

Military service
- Branch: United States Army
- Unit: Military Police

Nathan Nathaniel Holden (June 19, 1929 – May 7, 2025) was an American politician from Los Angeles County. He served for four years in the California State Senate and 16 years on the Los Angeles City Council.

== Life and career ==
=== Background ===
Nathan Nathaniel Holden was born in Macon, Georgia, on June 19, 1929, the son of a railroad brakeman in the Central of Georgia yards. He moved with his mother and brothers to a cold-water flat in Elizabeth, New Jersey, when he was 10; he quit high school at age 16, when, although he was underage, he enlisted in the U.S. Army, where he became a military policeman. Back home, he earned a high school diploma in night school and later studied design and engineering in the evenings at West Coast University. He worked for Bell Laboratories in New Jersey, then moved to California in 1955 and worked as an aerospace engineer. He had two sons, Chris Holden, a California State Assemblymember, and Reginald Holden, a Los Angeles County Deputy Sheriff. He died at a hospital in Santa Monica, California, on May 7, 2025, at the age of 95.

=== Description and personality ===
Holden was an amateur boxer as a teenager, weighing only 167 pounds. At age 59, he was a "tall, gray-haired dignified-looking man in a nicely conservative suit." Holden completed the Los Angeles Marathon in 1990 and 1991, when he was in his sixties.

He had two sides to his personality, Los Angeles Times reporter Bill Boyarsky wrote in 1989 — "The Nice Nate" and "The Mean Nate." On one hand, Holden was "a gentle, considerate, compassionate person much of the time." On the other hand, Boyarsky wrote, Holden was marked by a "hostile toughness . . . when he discusses the way black leaders refused to back him in unsuccessful races and in his election to the council." Fellow councilman John Ferraro said of Holden, "He is gruff and he is rough, but he has a big heart."

== Early political career ==
In California, he became active in Democratic politics; he was a member of the "steering committee for the California Democratic Council's peace delegation" and an officer of the Alta Loma Democratic Club. Holden made his first run for public office in 1968, when he was an unsuccessful candidate in California's 26th congressional district, which at the time included Beverly Hills, part of Culver City, most of Venice and some of Santa Monica and West Los Angeles. He became president of the CDC in 1970 and that year made two more runs for Congress.

== State Senate ==
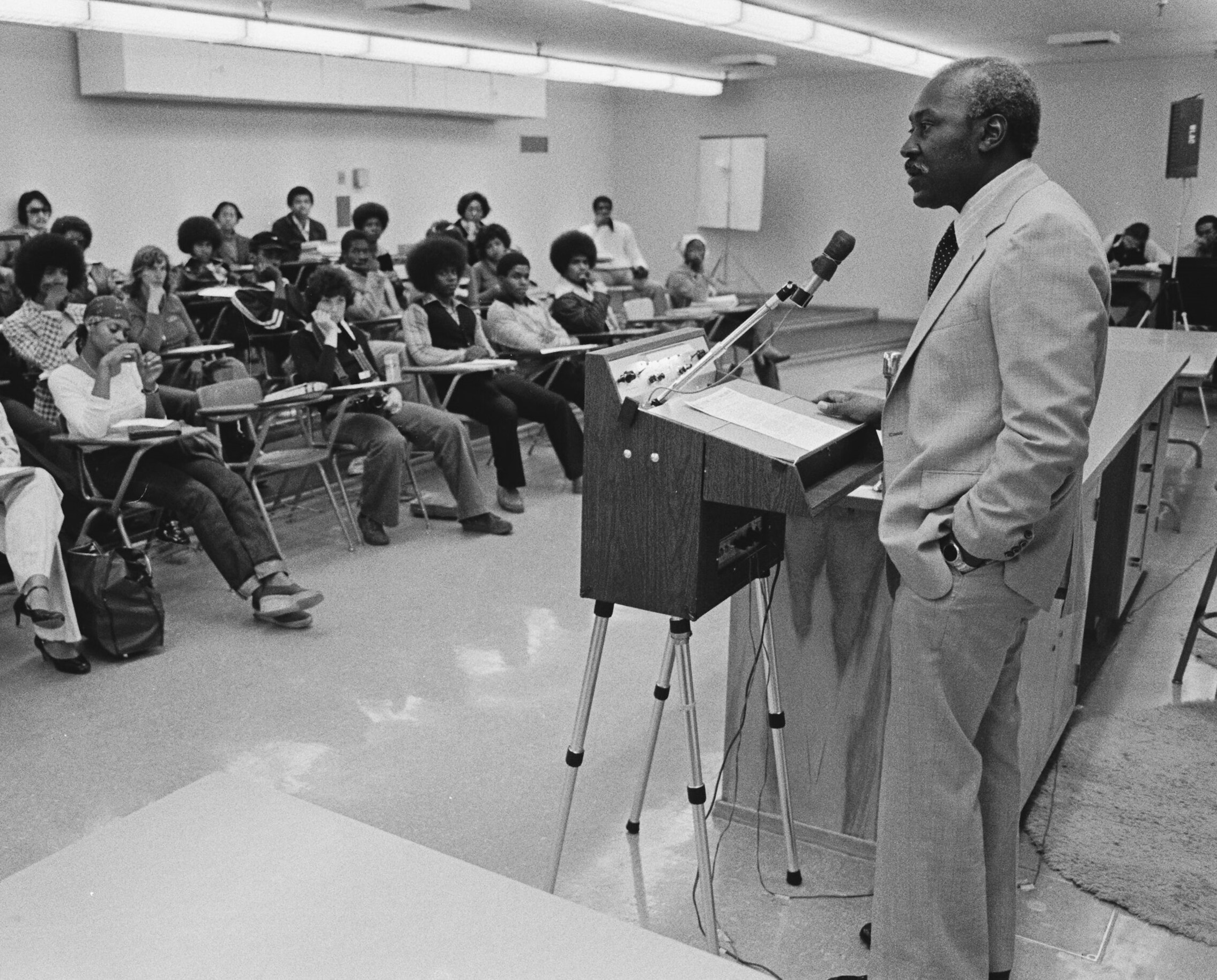
Holden speaking at West L.A. College

Holden began his service as a state senator in 1974, but gave up his office after four years to campaign unsuccessfully for the Congressional seat ultimately won by Julian C. Dixon.

== City Council ==
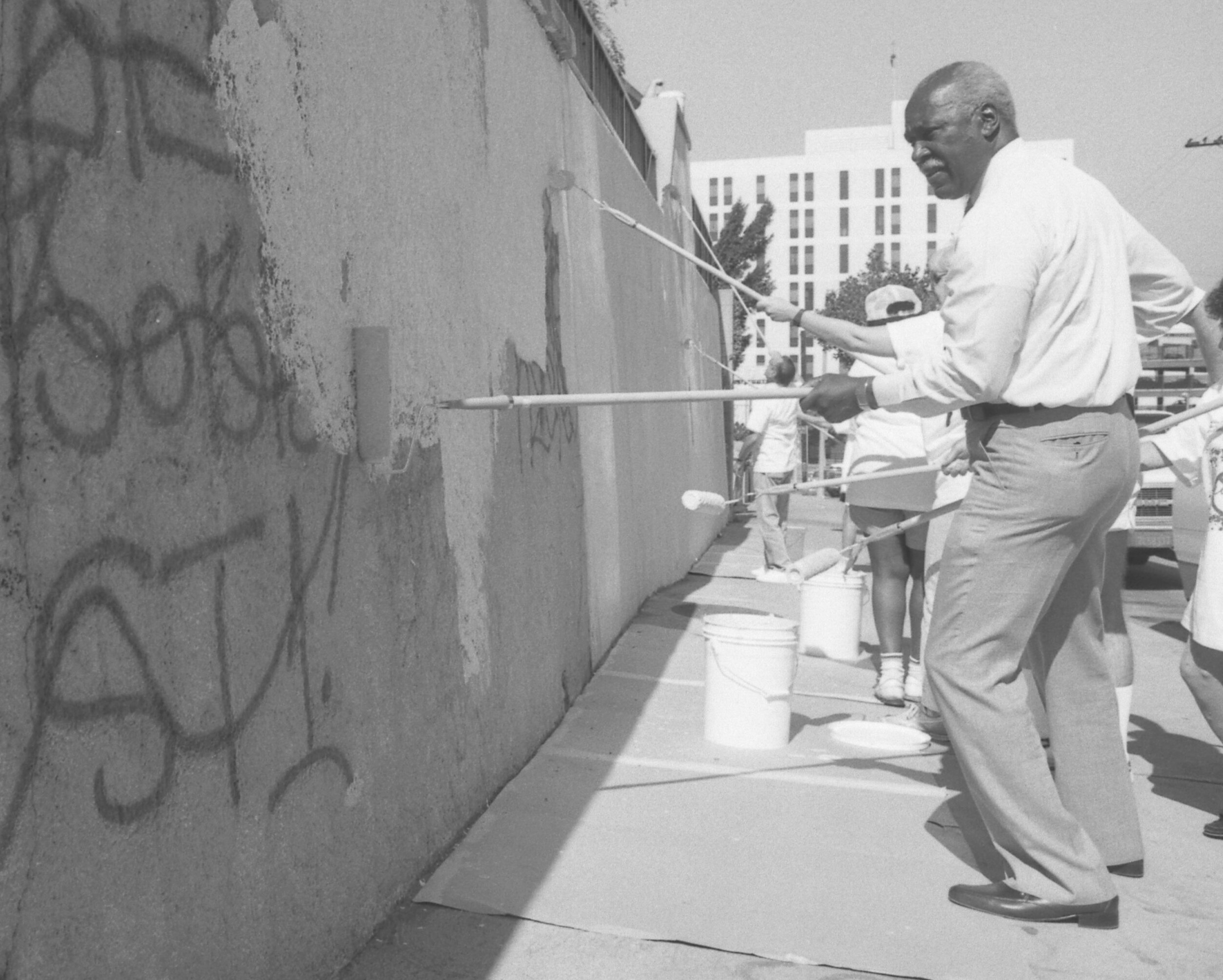
Holden helping paint over graffiti in 1989

While serving on the Los Angeles City Council, Holden supported Donald Trump's proposal to develop the site of the Ambassador Hotel in Los Angeles. In this capacity, Holden stated he rode a helicopter with Trump which nearly crashed in 1990. This incident gained attention in 2024 after Trump retold it, possibly confusing Holden with Willie Brown, and stating that he and Brown discussed Kamala Harris. Holden stated that no one on the flight discussed Harris. Holden's account was corroborated by Barbara Res, who was a Trump Organization employee at the time and also aboard the helicopter.

=== Elections ===
1987: Holden took a leave from his job as assistant chief deputy to Los Angeles County Supervisor Kenneth Hahn to run against Homer Broome Jr. for the 10th District seat that had been vacated by the resignation of Dave Cunningham. Holden won by a 2–1 margin, even though Broome had been endorsed by Mayor Tom Bradley. Another candidate was Esther M. Lofton, who received fewer than 100 votes.

1989: Holden took on Mayor Bradley directly when he entered the race for mayor. He angered some of his constituents during the campaign when he supported the proposed breakup of the Los Angeles Unified School District. It was noted just before the election that Bradley's campaign fund vastly surpassed Holden's — $1,085,861 to $67,252. Bradley received just over 50% percent of the vote to win in the April primary. 8,000 ballots were damaged and not counted in the overall total.

1991: Lofton, 60, a former schoolteacher "with no political base," challenged Holden again, stating she would not accept campaign contributions. When the votes were counted, Lofton had won an "astounding 28%," the Los Angeles Times remarked editorially, ascribing the large percentage to Holden's "hands-off" policy regarding Police Chief Daryl Gates.

1995: Holden was challenged in the April primary by Deputy District Attorney Kevin A. Ross and by Rhodes Scholar and Yale Law School graduate J. Stanley (Stan) Sanders. In the final election against Sanders in June, Holden received 54% of the vote and was elected.

=== Legislation ===
1987: Forbidding the sale or manufacture of realistic toy guns. Bill passed.

1990: Requiring buyers of Rolex watches to register the serial number with police to make it difficult for criminals to sell them. Introduced in the wake of a rash of Rolex thefts of about one a day, with some owners killed.

1999: Requiring cable companies to remove sneakers tied together and left dangling from overhead lines. Holden said they were "menacing signals of gang territory and drug sales." Police officials said they were just pranks. Bill passed.

== Legacy ==
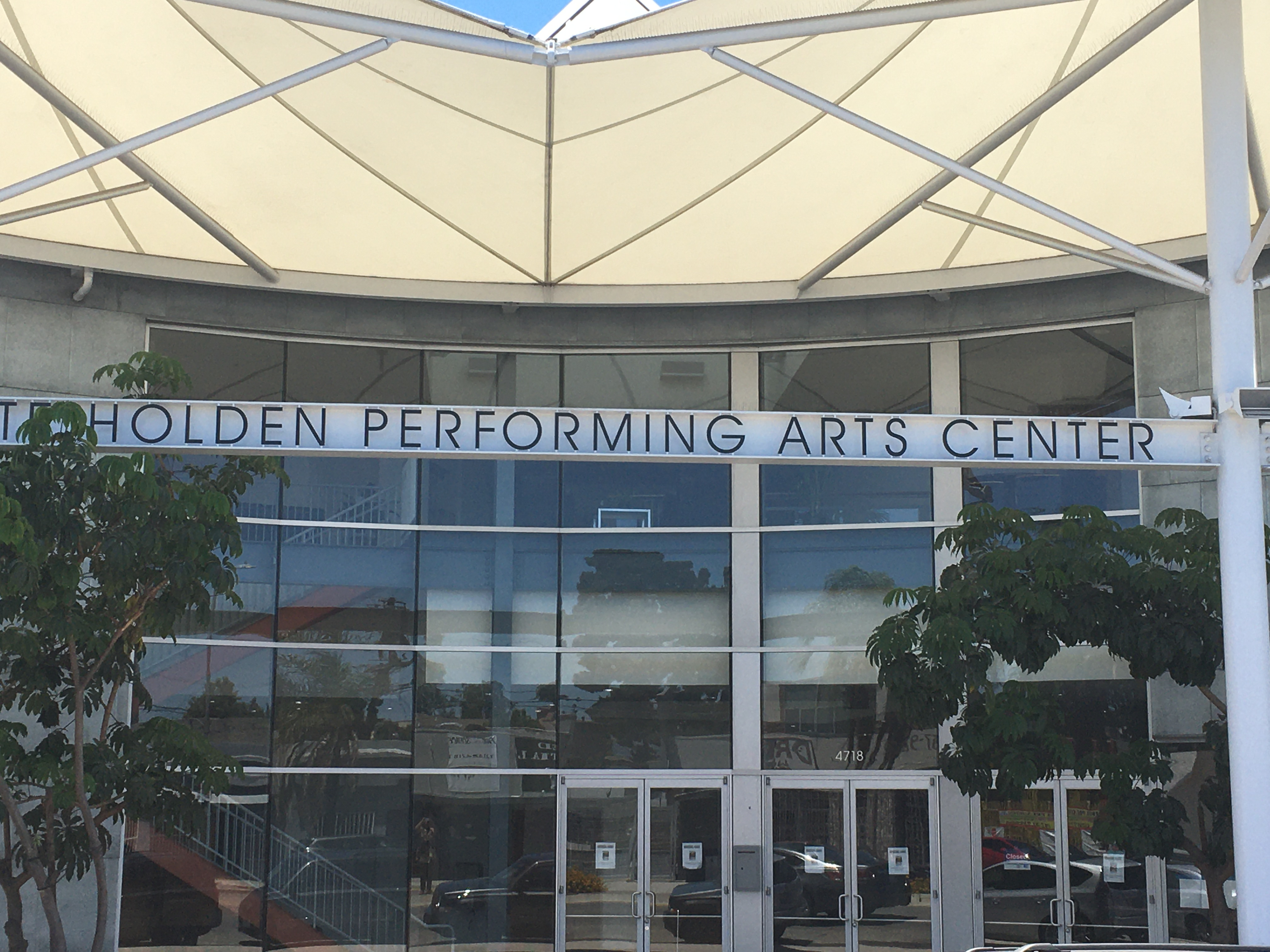
Nate Holden Performing Arts Center 2021

- The Nate Holden Performing Arts Center at 4718 West Washington Boulevard is named in his honor.
- Changed the restrictions that prevented women from acquiring a mortgage without the signature of a man.
- Was the author of the legislation that led the State of California (the first state in the nation) to recognize the Martin Luther King Jr. holiday.

Political offices
Preceded by David Cunningham	Los Angeles City Council; 10th District; 1987–2002	Succeeded by Martin Ludlow
California Senate
Preceded by Lawrence E. Walsh	California State Senator; 30th district 1974–1978	Succeeded by Diane Watson
