= William Michaelian =

Armenian-American novelist, writer, and poet (born 1956)

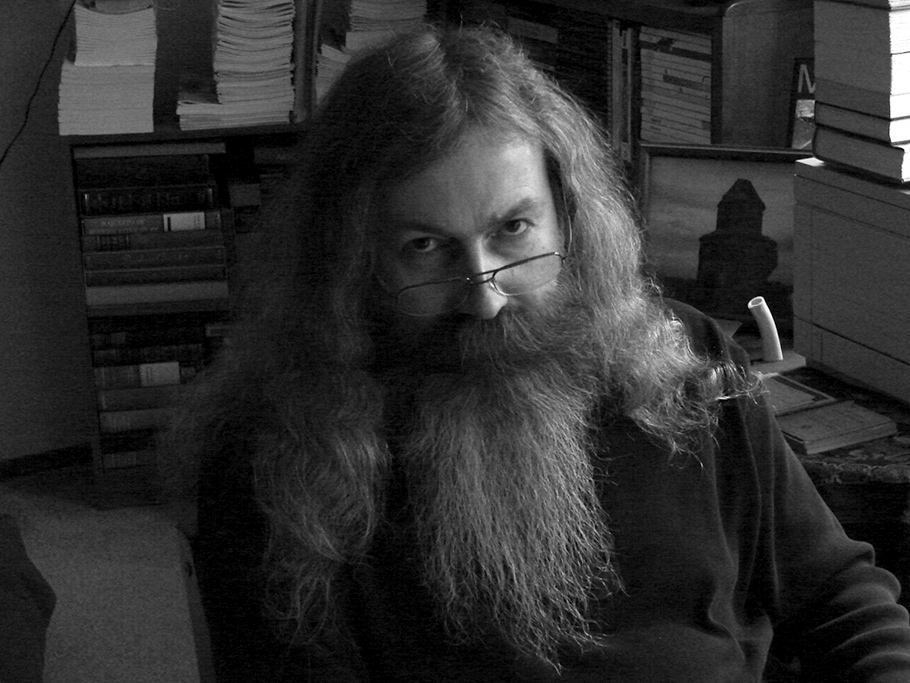
- Michaelian in 2007
- Born: May 20, 1956 (age 70); Dinuba, California, U.S.
- Occupations: Novelist; short story writer; poet
- Writing career
- Period: 1997–present
- Website: williammichaelian.com

William Michaelian (born May 20, 1956) is an Armenian-American novelist, short-story writer, and poet. Born in Dinuba, California, a small town southeast of Fresno, Michaelian grew up on his family's farm. He has lived in Salem, Oregon, since 1987. His stories, poems, and drawings have appeared in literary periodicals in the United States and Armenia; his work has been performed on Armenian National Radio. His fiction and poetry have appeared in Ararat (New York), a quarterly journal devoted to literary and historical work on Armenian subjects. He is also a contributor to the multilingual Armenian Poetry Project, curated and produced in New York by Lola Koundakjian. In 2003, he launched an open online literary dialogue, "The Conversation Continues", with John Berbrich, publisher and editor of the small press literary quarterly, Barbaric Yawp (Russell, New York).

== Assessment ==
Michaelian's work has been compared by reviewers to that of Walt Whitman, James Thurber, Samuel Beckett, and Fyodor Dostoevsky. Analysis of contemporary human behavior, sympathy for the downtrodden, humor, satire, and a strong anti-war sentiment are hallmarks of his work. Much of his poetry and prose bears a lyrical, rhythmic quality; in many pieces, its visual appearance adds to this effect. Other influences include Richard Brautigan, Thomas Wolfe, Guy de Maupassant, and William Saroyan, the author's contemporary and grandmother's first cousin.

Michaelian has also published numerous drawings. Most are portraits of imaginary people with exaggerated emphasis placed on the eyes, which draw attention and help convey a range of emotion. A progressional study of the drawings on Michaelian's website reveals that his subjects have taken on a more sorrowful or troubled aspect over time. This is especially evident in the pencil drawings that accompany his Songs and Letters, a mostly autobiographical collection of poetry and prose he began in 2005.

== Website ==
Michaelian's website, "I'm Telling You All I Know", is an extensive archive that includes complete authorized versions of much of the author's work; autobiographical material that focuses on various periods of his life including the present; and reviews, commentary, family recipes, and hundreds of the author's drawings. The material is organized into departments; the purpose of each department is clearly defined in an introduction or preface. The site also contains works-in-progress which, when completed, are maintained for public access. Useful notes and background information pertaining to the author's print publications and other online publications are included on a news page.

== A Listening Thing ==
=== Synopsis ===
A Listening Thing is the fictional first-person narrative of Stephen Monroe, a self-employed divorced man battling financial insolvency and emotional instability. Still in love with his ex-wife, Mary, and strongly attached to their teenaged son, Matt, Michaelian's main character struggles with guilt and low self-esteem toward a positive affirmation of himself. Encouraged by the discovery of an untapped talent and the growing hope of a rekindled relationship with Mary, Stephen grapples, often humorously, with the problems of daily life while seeking their root cause in society and himself. The novel focuses on a harrowing week that culminates in Stephen and Mary making the long drive to Stephen's hometown to visit Stephen's aging mother. The emotionally exhausting trip leads to the possibility of the couple's full reconciliation.

=== Social significance ===
While the story can be enjoyed for its romantic element, humorous element, and Michaelian's careful treatment of its major and minor characters, the author uses his protagonist to address several major societal concerns. These include poverty and homelessness; the ongoing presence and threat of war; the shortcomings of public education; and social alienation. As a result, the story transcends its simple framework, and serves as a compendium of relevant contemporary observations, and as a compelling plea for understanding and self-exploration.

=== Publication history ===
The novel was first scheduled for print publication in 2002. Michaelian published the work himself, however, in 2003, after publicly documenting the difficulties, business irregularities, and delays he experienced with the book's contracted publisher. The self-published edition can be found on his website. The title page includes a preface to the complete electronic text; the original cover art for the unpublished paperback print edition; promotional copy intended for the cover; and several short reviews. Since the author made the novel available, there has been an increase in demand for an unspecified number of review copies distributed by the publisher to the book trade prior to the time the publisher broke its contract. The original retail price for the book had been set at $14.95. According to the author, prices for a single review copy on Amazon.com have ranged from $33.00 to $707.00. In an explanatory note on the same site, he certifies the text in the review copies as authentic and complete.

== Works ==
=== Novels ===
- A Listening Thing Electronic Text (2003)

=== Short stories ===
- Among the Living and Other Stories. Musclehead Press. (2000)
- No Time to Cut My Hair Electronic Text (2002)
- Early Short Stories Electronic Text (2005)

=== Poetry ===
- Winter Poems . San Francisco: Cosmopsis Books. ISBN 978-0-9796599-0-4 (2007)
- Another Song I Know . San Francisco: Cosmopsis Books. ISBN 978-0-9796599-1-1 (2007)
- Great Minds Think Alike. Poem included in the Collected Poems section of the author's website.

=== Translations ===
- A Map of My Heart. Yerevan, Armenia: Artasamanyan Grakanutyun. ISBN 99941-0-136-6 (2004)
- The Old Language. Yerevan, Armenia: Tigran Mets. ISBN 99941-917-1-3 (2004)

=== Daily journals ===
- One Hand Clapping Electronic Text (2003–2005)
