= Los Angeles County Federation of Labor =

Labor council for unions in California

The Los Angeles County Federation of Labor (LACFL) is the central labor council for unions and worker organizations in Los Angeles County, California. The organization has its roots in the late 19th century when trade unions across the Los Angeles region formed labor councils for mutual aid, eventually affiliating with the American Federation of Labor in 1901. From the 1930s to the 1950s, unions affiliated with the Congress of Industrial Organizations (CIO) participated in their own Industrial Union Council while unions affiliated with the AFL continued to work through the city-based central labor councils. The LACFL was formed by the merger of the CIO Industrial Labor Council and six city central labor councils in 1959. As of 2024, the LACFL represents over 300 unions and more than 800,000 people throughout Los Angeles County.

== Membership ==
The Los Angeles County Federation of Labor has three hundred and forty-five affiliates representing its over eight hundred thousand members. This membership has grown at a staggering rate just in 1934 membership totaled 70,000 now there are over 800,000 members. The largest of its union workers groups is the 75,000 homecare and nursing home workers they alone now comprise a larger number of workers than the entire Los Angeles County Federation of Labor of 1934. Second only the homecare and nursing works is the 45,000 county workers that belong to SEIU. LA County Federation of Labor of Labor also represents over 30,000 teachers along with 28,00 members working in the film and television industry. The Executive Board of the LA County Federation of Labor's Executive Board consists of thirty-five members that are appointed to key union leadership roles. The LA County Federation of Labor also has a committee that deals with political Education called COPE with ninety-five voting associates and more than thirteen thousand representatives that can participate in its monthly delegates meetings.

“A survey published in December 2003 showed that the three largest unions in the Los Angeles County Federation of Labor were SEIU 434B (with seventy-four thousand homecare and nursing home workers), SEIU 399 with forty-five thousand health care and other employees, and the United Teachers of Los Angeles (with thirty thousand teachers from the American Federation of Teachers and the National Education Association).”

== Governance ==
The Los Angeles County Federation of Labor has an executive board that consists of thirty-five members. There is a Committee on Political Education (C.O.P.E.) that has ninety-five voting member. C.O.P.E. also has 1300 delegates to participate in its monthly delegates meetings. It is also affiliated with the labor directory Labor 411.

== History ==
=== The Fight for Minimum Wage ===
The Los Angeles County Federation of labor played a role in the initial fight for minimum wage. Through the efforts of the Building Trades Council whose main intent is and purpose is to benefit the Building tradesmen and his dependents. Activities of the Building Trades council had a direct impact on the accomplishments of labor their movement was justified by fighting for higher wages and shorter hours. They were successful in aiding in the fight for the eight-hour day and hoped to further their accomplishments with an even lower 6-hour day and with higher wages. The Building Trade Council took a step forward in bringing about a prevailing wage law by Federal enactment. This law made a requirement that all Federal projects live up to local wage scales wherever the building is constructed. The usefulness of this eventually lead to the members receiving benefit during times of injury with workers compilation laws.

In more recent news Los Angeles County Federation of labor has started a new campaign to raise Los Angeles’ minimum wage from nine to fifteen dollars per hour. Following the recent win of the workers of large hotels minimum wage increase to 15.37 labor groups hope for similar results from the city council. A clear plan has not been put forth for the workings of a citywide minimum wage increase but labor groups are ready to fight for it. Mayor Eric Garcetti already set forth a plan to raise the city's minimum wage to 13.25 by 2017. The Los Angeles Chamber of Commerce opposes both plans noting that it would cause companies to have to lay off a large number of workers.

=== “Army Unemployed – Los Angeles” ===
The beginning of 1914 unemployment rates in Los Angeles grew at a staggering rate from January to April the Central Labor Council of Los Angeles did its best to dispense free meals to up to 200 men each day. During this time of great strife groups sought to alleviate their conditions by forming labor groups of their own, one of such labor workers was “general” Morris Rose. Rose assembled a group of unemployed workers under the north Main Street Bridge, Rose chose to call his group an army and was arrested by the police but later released after exploding that his group was one of nonviolence. The police hoped that Rose and his group would leave and join a similar one in Sacramento. Rose and his army chose to stay in Los Angeles and set up an unemployment office in the riverbed. He offered to place from one to a thousand variously skilled workers to business on short notice at a rate of $2.50 an hour with a workday of eight hours. Rose was later accused of being paid by open shop supporters to cause trouble among the union members by his followers he denied all allegations. General Rose was noted for adding a humorous note to the seriousness of the unemployment situation. Rose was able to create identification buttons that had “Army Unemployed – Los Angeles” on them, eventually the police grew tired of his operations and told him to vacate the city. He threatened to have all his men register as voters, call an election and take over the government – it never happened.

=== Bad Times for Central Labor Council ===
It was represented by the January 1915 Los Angeles Times that the membership of the Los Angeles' organized labor was decreasing, “Hard times have hit the Central Labor Council and trade unionism in this city and is at its dying gasp.” This statement was based on the presumption that the Union Temple Association having problems selling stock to pay its mortgage and that the union secretary and assistance had not been paid in weeks was a sign of decreasing support for the union. The labor temple was completed in 1910 after seven years of fund raising and construction. By 1913 only $95,000 remained unpaid on the building. Members of the local labor movement were asked to retire the debt by buying stock shares in the association. Ten months later little progress was made because issues between the Central Labor Council and the Building Trades Council.

A drive to increase union membership began in October 1913 at the Fresno convention of the California state Federation of Labor. Paul Sharrenberg agreed to approach the membership for campaign funds; L. W. Butler was placed in charge of the campaign. The campaign started on January 1, 1914. By March, Butler announced that 25,000 nonunion men received information about the benefit of union membership. “The Citizen called the drive the most comprehensible ever attempted in the city – But it Failed.” The failure was attributed to a multitude of unstated issues including a feud between the Central Labor Council and the Building Trade Council. The result was the stagnation of the labor movement; the open-shop forces were able to suppress Los Angeles unions. The dispute between the Central Labor Council and Building Trades council caused a large number of workers to withdraw from the Central Labor Council decreasing its revenue at a time that could not be any worse. Months later the rift between the labor councils was healed.

== Notable people ==
=== Maria Elena Durazo ===
Maria Elena Durazo was originally elected to serve for the Los Angeles County Federation of Labor as their Executive Secretary-Treasurer on May 15, 2006. Durazo attended college at St Mary's in California and graduated in 1975. In 1985, she earned a law degree from the People's College of Law. After college, she became a part of the International Ladies Garment Workers Union and the Hotel Employees and Restaurant Employees Union. Durazo served as the Vice Chair of the Democratic National Convention Committee in 2008. Durazo recently announced that she will be leaving the Los Angeles County Federation of Labor at the end of the year to take a national union job.

=== James Wood ===
James Wood was one of Los Angeles County's prevailing labor leaders of downtown Los Angeles during the building boom in the late 1970s and 80's. During his reign of over a decade Wood assisted in building the Los Angeles Community Redevelopment Agency into the most powerful mechanism of social transformation in the city, before he was elected to head the Los Angeles County Federation of Labor. Noted as a versatile man, Wood was known as proficient and well versed in the boardroom. He was seen as a peer to top businessmen as well as working the docks doing the hard work of labor. Wood was born in Lancaster, California, but was raised in Merced, California. While attending Cal State Sacramento, Wood became the leader of a statewide drive to prevent tuition increases for state schools. After Wood graduated, he eventually moved to Los Angeles and joined the staff of the County Federation of Labor in 1974.

=== Miguel Contreras ===
Miguel Contreras became political director of the Los Angeles County Federation of labor in 1994. After being selected by James Wood, Contreras earned his position as executive secretary-treasurer of the LA County Federation of Labor by way of election making him the first person of color to hold his position. Contreras came from a family of farm workers in Dinuba, California there he joined United Farm Workers of America and learned organizing and the movements of politics. Eventually, Contreras moved to Los Angeles for his position, assigned by the international as trustee to HERE Local 11. While working with HERE Local 11 Contreras worked closely with Maria Elena Durazo. Contreras held his position as Executive Secretary Treasurer until his death, during his tenure he focused on immigrant workers and exasperated to his union into the Los Angeles political scene.

=== Rusty Hicks ===
Rusty Hicks took over January 1, 2015 as head of the Los Angeles County Federation of Labor. Hicks was unanimously elected as the Executive secretary Treasurer of the Los Angeles County Federation of Labor. Before taking this position Hicks had been the Political Director for the Los Angeles Federation of Labor since 2006 before this he was the District Director for a member of the California State Assembly. Hicks graduated from Austin College in 2002 and Loyola Law School.

== Archival collections ==
The papers and archives of the Los Angeles County Federation of Labor are held in Special Collections and Archives at the University Library at California State University, Northridge.

== See also ==
- California Labor Federation
