= María Elena Durazo =

American politician

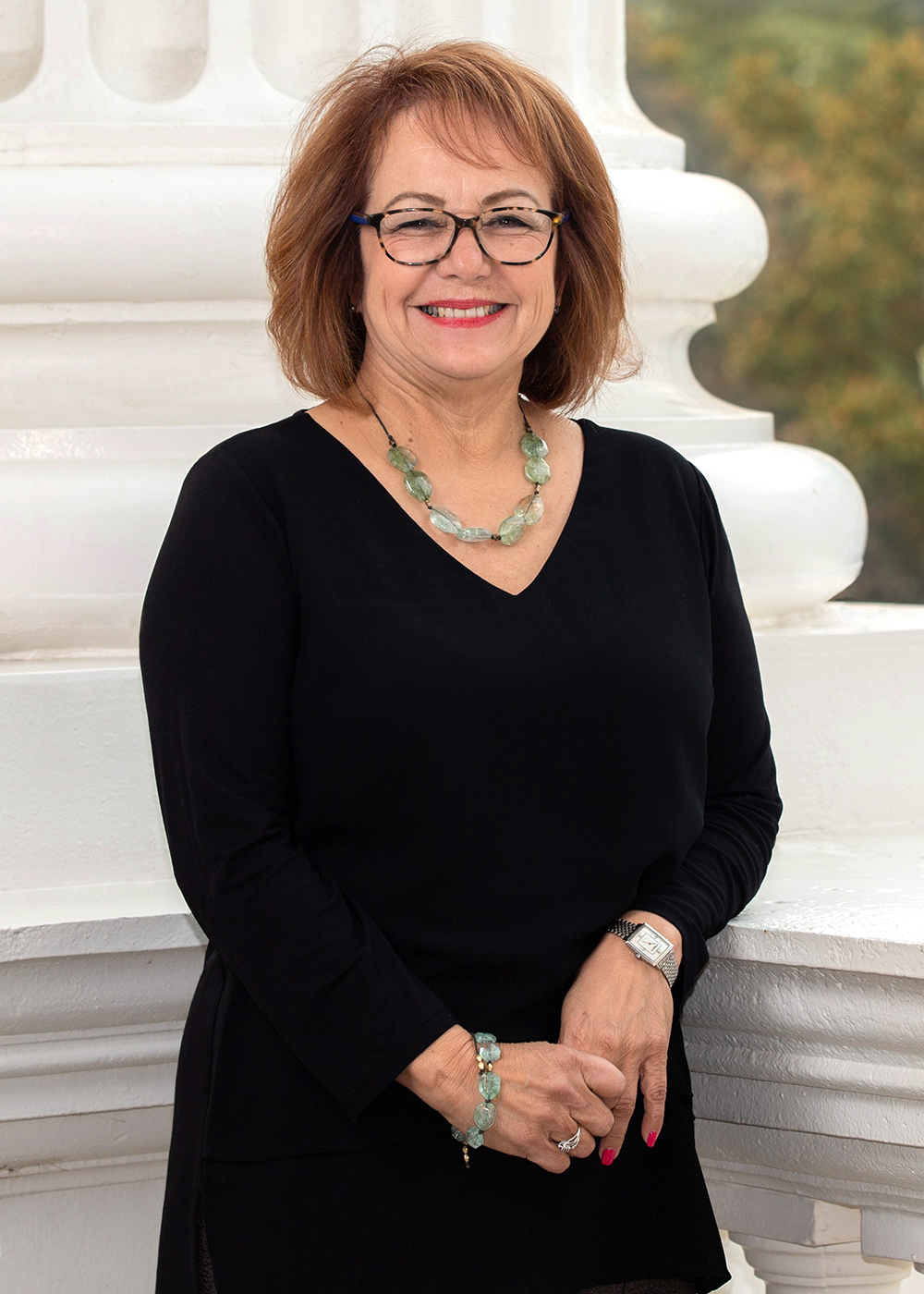
- Official portrait, 2018

Member-elect of the Los Angeles County Board of Supervisors from the 1st district
- Assuming office December 7, 2026
- Succeeding: Hilda Solis

Member of the California State Senate
- Incumbent
- Assumed office December 3, 2018
- Preceded by: Kevin de León
- Constituency: 24th district (2018–2022); 26th district (2022–present)

Personal details
- Born: María Elena Durazo; March 20, 1953 (age 73) Madera, California, U.S.
- Party: Democratic
- Spouse: Miguel Contreras (m. 1988; died 2005)
- Children: 2
- Education: St. Mary's College (BA); People's College of Law (JD)

María Elena Durazo (born March 20, 1953) is an American politician. A member of the Democratic Party, she has served in the California State Senate since 2018. She has represented the 26th district since 2022, encompassing Central Los Angeles, Northeast Los Angeles, East Los Angeles, and Vernon.

Prior to being elected to the State Senate, she was an American trade union official. She was the Executive Secretary-Treasurer of the Los Angeles County Federation of Labor from May 2006 until December 2014. She was the Executive Vice President of the governing Executive Council of the national AFL-CIO and Vice Chair of the Democratic National Committee from 2013 to 2021.

== Biography ==
=== Early career ===
As the daughter of Mexican immigrants, she spent summers in the Central Valley fields picking peaches, strawberries, and grapes. Cesar Chavez, founder of the United Farmworkers of America, inspired her to get involved in the fight for equal rights. Durazo attended St. Mary's College in Moraga, California and graduated in 1975. In 1985, she graduated from the Peoples College of Law in Los Angeles, before beginning her involvement in the labor movement as an organizer for the International Ladies' Garment Workers' Union.

In 1983, she joined the Hotel Employees and Restaurant Employees Union (HERE) Local 11. In 1987, Durazo led a reform slate against the entrenched local leadership of Andrew (Scotty) Allen whose administration had resisted efforts of immigrant workers to participate in local governance. Durazo appeared to have the upper hand, but the election was set aside by the international union, and the local was placed in a trusteeship led by Miguel Contreras. In May 1989, Maria Elena was elected President of Local 11, serving in that capacity from 1989 to 2006. In 1993, during the union's campaign against the New Otani Hotel, (the first hotel to be built non-union in downtown Los Angeles) Durazo led workers on civil disobedience protests. Her participation in the sit-in protest led to her being arrested along with several other New Otani workers, many of whom were dragged away by police officers. She was later elected onto the executive board of HERE International Union in 1996, and in 2004 was elected Executive Vice President of UNITE-HERE International.

From 2000 to 2004, she served on the National AFL-CIO's Immigration Committee and was at some point chair of the committee. In 2003, Durazo became the National Director of the Immigrant Workers' Freedom Ride.

=== Executive Secretary-Treasurer ===
In 2005 her husband, Miguel Contreras, passed. Contreras who preceded Martin Ludlow as the executive secretary-treasurer of the Los Angeles County Federation of Labor, AFL-CIO. The Los Angeles County Federation of Labor represents 600,000 workers, and it reached the climax of its influence under Durazo, its first women leader. Durazo helped land allies on the Los Angeles City Council and county Board of Supervisors and pushed through a minimum wage law requiring large Los Angeles hotels to pay workers at least $15.37 an hour one of the nations highest base wages. Durazo was appointed as the interim Executive Secretary-Treasurer following the resignation of Martin Ludlow in February 2006, and was voted as the permanent replacement on May 15, 2006 where she served until October 2014. On August 4, 2010, she was reelected as Executive Secretary-Treasurer of the AFL-CIO.

On January 15, 2008, Durazo endorsed Barack Obama for president, and took a three-week leave of absence from her job as Executive Secretary-Treasurer of the Los Angeles County Federation of Labor in order to campaign for Obama. She then became a national co-chair of the Obama for President campaign committee, and was a pledged delegate for Obama at the National Convention in Denver. She served as Vice Chair on the 2008 Democratic National Convention Committee and as National Co-Chair of the Barack Obama Presidential Campaign.

On August 11, 2008, Durazo was elected to serve as the new chair of the UCLA Labor Center advisory committee. The vote was by acclamation.

In 2010, Durazo was elected onto the national AFL-CIO Executive Council as an Executive Vice President. She was elected as a Vice Chair of the Democratic National Committee in 2013.

In 2013, Dan Schnur, then director of the Jesse M. Unruh Institute of Politics at USC, said that "Maria Elena Durazo is probably the single most influential individual in Los Angeles politics."Capitol Weekly named Maria Elena the third most influential non-elected California official in its 2010 Top 100 List. Durazo was named Most Valuable Local Labor Leader by The Nation magazine in their 2014 Progressive Honor Roll.

=== California State Senate ===
On April 6, 2017, Durazo announced that she intended to run for the 24th district of the California State Senate in 2018, when the incumbent, Kevin de León was termed out. In her announcement, she stated that Donald Trump's victory in the 2016 presidential elections was her main motivation for running for public office. Durazo won the election and assumed office on December 3, 2018. After the 2022 redistricting, she began representing the 26th district, which includes Central Los Angeles, Northeast Los Angeles, East Los Angeles, and the City of Vernon.

Since taking office, Durazo has focused on issues related to workers' rights, immigrant protections, housing policy, and economic justice.

==== Minimum wage ====
Durazo authored Senate Bill 525, which established California’s first statewide healthcare-specific minimum wage, setting a path to $25 per hour for over 400,000 healthcare workers. The bill aimed to address staffing shortages and improve patient care, ensuring fair wages for frontline workers in hospitals, skilled nursing facilities, dialysis clinics, and community health centers.

Durazo championed Senate Bills 62 and 639, which phased out subminimum wages for garment workers and workers with disabilities respectively, ensuring they receive at least the California minimum wage. SB 62 strengthened protections for garment workers by eliminating the piece rate in the industry, ensuring garment workers are paid legal wages for all time spent working, allowing for incentive-based bonuses, and expanding liability for wage violations. SB 639 ended the use of federal 14(c) certificates, which had allowed employers to pay disabled workers significantly less than minimum wage, often as low as $2 per hour.

==== Medi-Cal ====
Durazo was a driving force behind California’s Health4All initiative, which expanded Medi-Cal to all income-eligible Californians, regardless of immigration status. Her efforts led to the passage of SB 56 (Health4All Seniors) and SB 29 (Health4All Adults), making California the first state in the nation to provide full-scope Medi-Cal to nearly 2 million undocumented residents. The 2025-2026 state budget cuts froze Medi-Cal enrollment for undocumented Californians beginning January 1, 2026. As of 2026, Senator Durazo proposed SB 1422 to unfreeze enrollment.

==== Criminal justice reform ====
Durazo authored Senate Bill 731, which expanded record clearance for over one million Californians. The bill provided automatic record clearance for arrests that did not result in convictions and allowed individuals with non-violent felony convictions to petition for record sealing. SB 731 was one of the broadest record clearance laws in the nation, aimed at reducing barriers to employment, housing, and civic participation for formerly incarcerated individuals.

==== Housing ====
Durazo initially voted against SB 79, a bill to boost apartment and commercial construction around major public transportation hubs. Politico reported that, "Durazo argued SB 79 won’t solve the state’s housing affordability crisis because it doesn’t require developers to provide 'sufficient community benefits.' For example, she said, the bill should require project owners to set aside more units for low-income renters." After the bill was amended in the Assembly and came back to the State Senate, Durazo voted for SB 79.

==== Committee assignments ====
As of 2026, Durazo serves on multiple committees, including the Budget and Fiscal Review Committee, Health Committee, Housing Committee, Judiciary Committee, and Labor, Public Employment, and Retirement Committee. She is currently Chair of the Local Government Committee.

=== Candidacy for Los Angeles County Supervisor ===
In 2025, María Elena Durazo announced her candidacy for Los Angeles County Board of Supervisors, seeking to replace Hilda Solis in District 1. She won 60.6% of the vote and was elected as a supervisor without the need of a runoff.

== Personal life ==
In 1988, she married fellow union activist Miguel Contreras whom she met while at HERE Local 11.

Durazo was conferred an Honorary Doctor of Humane Letters from the California State University Board of Trustees. "We are very proud to award Maria Elena Durazo the honorary degree of Doctor of Humane Letters for 2014. Her significant impacts on the quality of life in this region demonstrate what can be achieved through dedication, hard work, and a commitment to community," said President William A. Covino.

== Electoral history ==
2018 California State Senate 24th district election
Primary election
Party	Candidate	Votes	%
Democratic	Maria Elena Durazo	63,719	69.8
Democratic	Peter Choi	27,566	30.2
Total votes		91,285	100.0
General election
Democratic	Maria Elena Durazo	139,473	66.9
Democratic	Peter Choi	69,160	33.1
Total votes		208,633	100.0
Democratic hold			

2022 California State Senate 26th district election
Primary election
Party	Candidate	Votes	%
Democratic	Maria Elena Durazo (incumbent)	108,999	99.6
Republican	Claudia Agraz (write-in)	425	0.4
Total votes		109,424	100.0
General election
Democratic	Maria Elena Durazo (incumbent)	155,727	82.9
Republican	Claudia Agraz	32,022	17.1
Total votes		187,749	100.0
Democratic hold			

2026 Los Angeles County Board of Supervisors District 1 election
Candidate	Votes	%
María Elena Durazo	184,974	60.58
Elaine Alaniz	41,306	13.53
David Argudo	29,095	9.53
Noel Almario	29,058	9.52
Annabella Figueroa Mazariegos	20,887	6.84
Total votes	305,320	100.00

== Footnotes ==
=== Further reading ===
- Aron, Hillel (December 2013). "The Wage Warrior". Los Angeles. Los Angeles. Archived from the original on 2013-12-27.
