= Baldwin Hills =

Baldwin Hills may refer to:

== Places ==
- Baldwin Hills (mountain range), Los Angeles County, California, U.S.
- Baldwin Hills, Los Angeles, a neighborhood in South Los Angeles, California, U.S.
- Baldwin Village, Los Angeles, a neighborhood in South Los Angeles, California, U.S.
- Baldwin Village, a commercial enclave in Toronto, Ontario, Canada
- Baldwin Vista, Los Angeles, a neighborhood in South Los Angeles, California, U.S.

== Other uses ==
- Baldwin Hills (TV series), an American reality TV series 2007–2009

== See also ==
- Baldwin (disambiguation)
- Baldwin Lake (disambiguation)
- Baldwin Hills Dam disaster, 1963
- Baldwin Vista, Los Angeles, a neighborhood in South Los Angeles, California, U.S.
