= William M. Hughes =

American politician

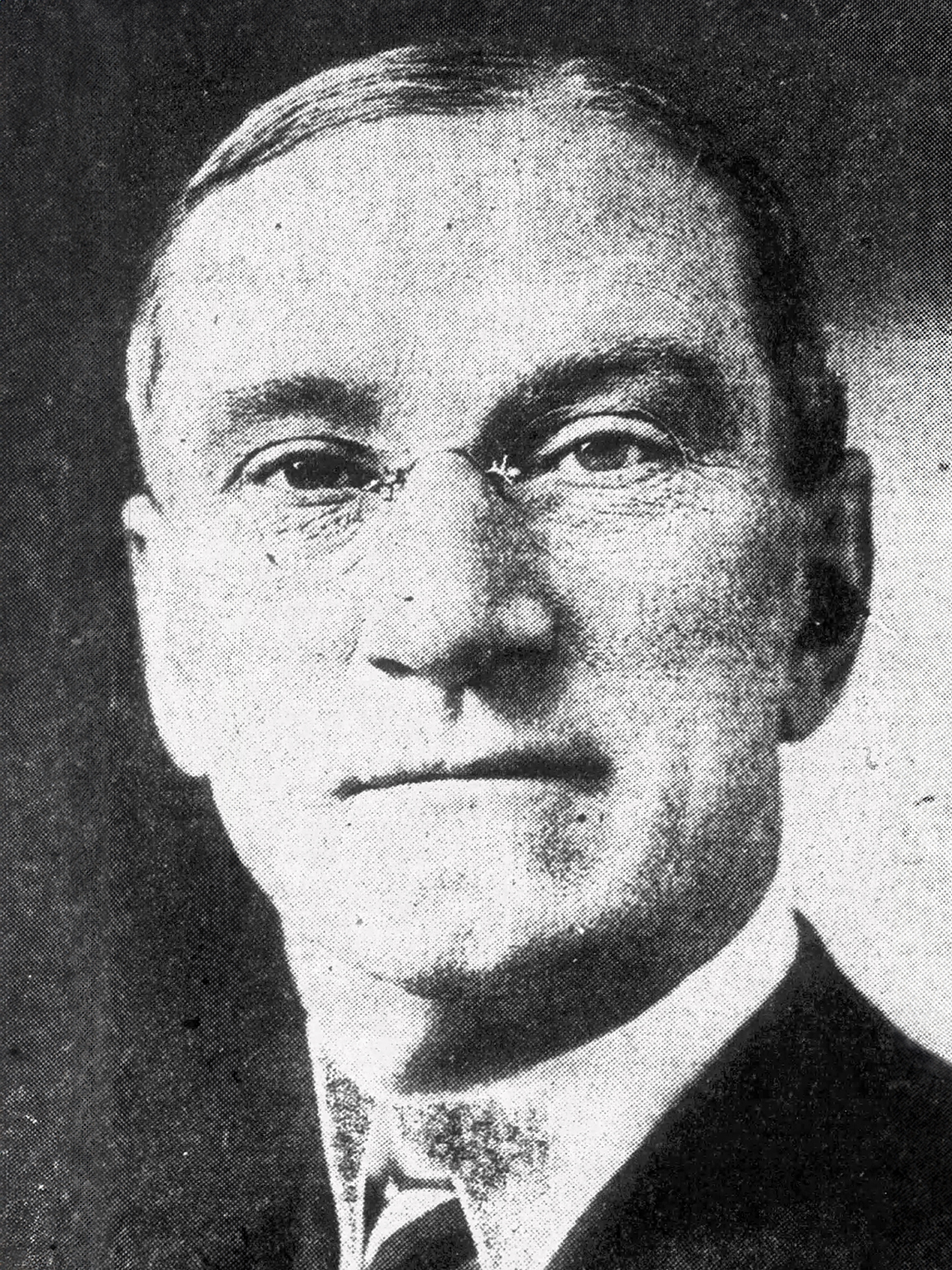
- Hughes in 1929

Member of the Los Angeles City Council from the 4th district
- In office July 1, 1927 – June 30, 1929
- Preceded by: Boyle Workman
- Succeeded by: Robert L. Burns

William M. Hughes was a member of the Los Angeles, California, City Council between 1927 and 1929. He moved to that city in 1905 and became a "large property owner," living at 1827 South Harvard Boulevard, just north of Washington Boulevard in today's Harvard Heights.

== Career ==
Hughes was elected to represent the 4th District in 1927. At that time the district lay between Western Avenue on the west, Hoover Avenue on the east, Melrose Avenue on the north and Washington Street on the south. His bid for reelection failed in 1929.

As a councilman, he urged the council to encourage conventions to come to Los Angeles, saying in August 1927:

Decorate the streets, entertain the convention visitors. We need conventions. If the delegates enjoy themselves and are made to feel welcome, they will return to their houses praising Los Angeles. While they are here, they patronize our stores and hotels, and it makes business for our city.

Along with Council Members E. Snapper Ingram and Ernest L. Webster, he opposed an ordinance to prohibit bonfires on city-owned beaches. They said the law would be "just another 'don't' and that the bonfires and 'weenie roasts' do no harm to anyone and furnish harmless recreation for people who go to the beaches."

Hughes lost his temper on two occasions during council meetings:

Like children with their new Christmas toys, members of the City Council yesterday were excited and delighted over selecting locations for their private offices in the new City Hall — all but Councilman Hughes, who became so angered over the method used that he called Councilman [Virgil A.] Martin a "meddler" for the latter's effort to parcel out the rooms. In turn, Councilman Martin called Councilman Hughes a "liar." . . . "Don't you call me a liar or I'll knock your head off," said Councilman Hughes to Councilman Martin."

The second occasion prompted a Los Angeles Times reporter to label Hughes "Battling Bill" when Hughes threatened to knock the "snoot" off a spectator at a council meeting.

| Preceded by Boyle Workman | Los Angeles City Council; 4th district 1927–27 | Succeeded by Robert L. Burns |
