= Charles E. Downs =

American politician

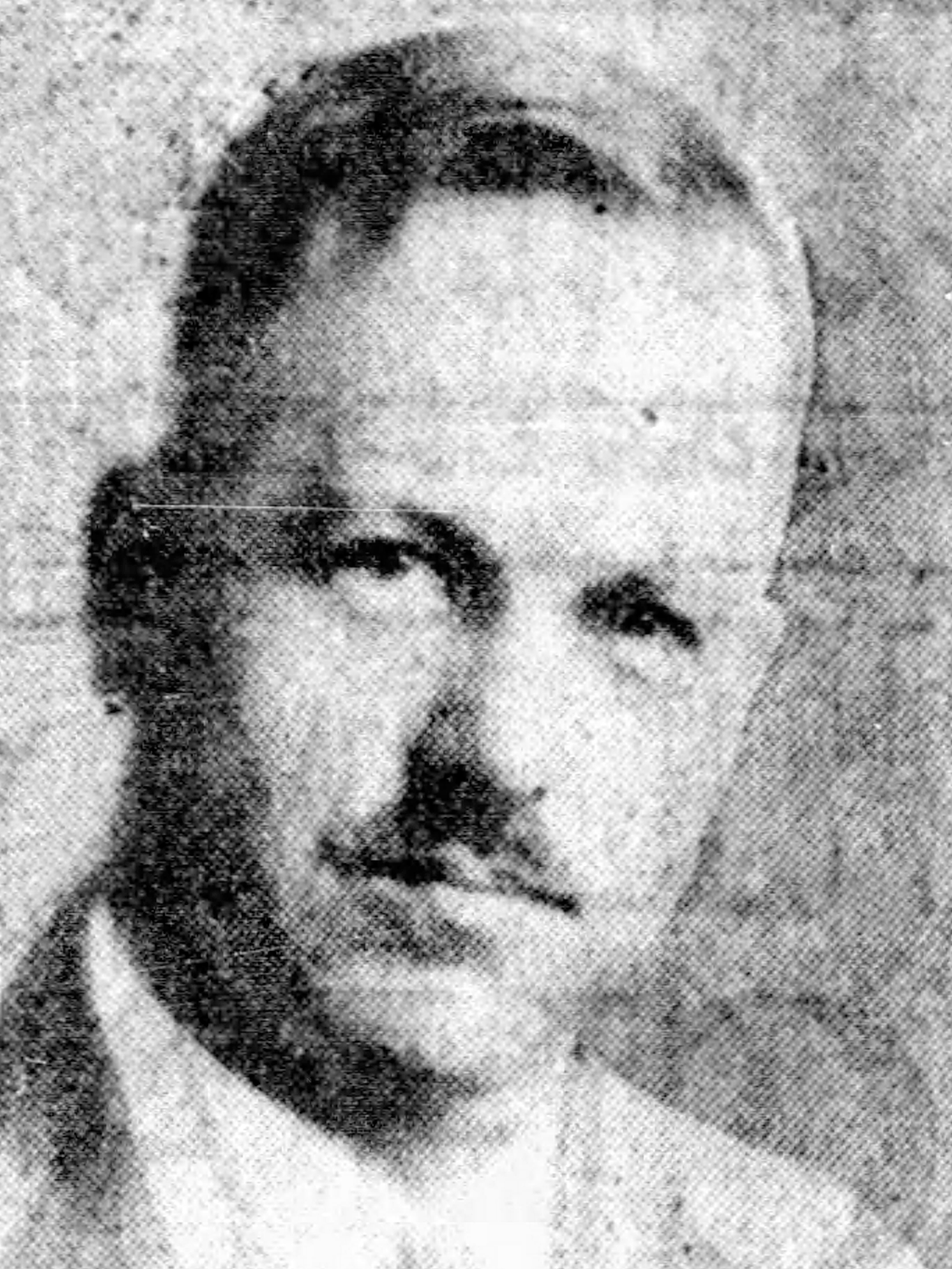
- Downs in 1925

Member of the Los Angeles City Council for the 10th district
- In office July 1, 1925 – August 21, 1925
- Preceded by: District established
- Succeeded by: Otto J. Zahn

Personal details
- Born: February 11, 1898 Los Angeles, California
- Died: May 15, 1967 (aged 69)
- Political party: Republican

Charles Emerson Downs (February 11, 1898 – May 15, 1967) was the first Los Angeles City Council member representing the 10th District after a new city charter went into effect in 1925. He was removed from office after just three months, however, when he was convicted of receiving a bribe from a developer who planned to construct a moving sidewalk in the Second Street Tunnel.

== Biography ==
Downs was born on February 11, 1898, in Los Angeles, and in 1907 he became a general contractor. His mother was Ada V. Downs, and his brothers were Milson W. Downs, Arthur S. Downs, and John W. Downs. He was married to Ruth Downs, who sued him for divorce in April 1928 while he was in San Quentin penitentiary. His daughter was Mrs. Elaine Mitchell, and his wife at the time of death on May 15, 1967, was Jean E. Downs.

== Political career ==
In June 1925, Downs was the successful candidate in the newly formed 10th District, which at that time was bounded by Pico, Jefferson, Vermont and Alameda Boulevards. In the general election, Downs was elected by a vote of 2,972 to 2,726 for Mark A. Pierce.

=== Arrest ===
Meanwhile, the former City Council had awarded a franchise to the Tunnels Transportation Company to build a moving sidewalk under the Second Street Tunnel, with seats, "on each side of which would be a public sidewalk." Downs and Joseph F. Fitzpatrick, both new council members, said they were opposed to the project, but, according to William Hodges, vice-president of Tunnels Transportation, one of Downs's tenants — Jack Murphy, or J. Howard Murphy — told Hodges that the councilmen's votes could be obtained.

Hodges went to Downs's office and asked him what was expected, to which Downs is said to have replied: "It's long and flat and green," and he drew a rectangle on the back of an envelope. The same day, Hodges said, he notified Council President Boyle Workman, and he then worked with District Attorney Asa Keyes and Chief Deputy D.A. Buron Fitts to lay a trap for Downs.

On August 18, 1925, the new council was set to adopt ordinances for the project, but Downs and Fitzpatrick objected to an immediate vote, stating they had an "important appointment" to keep. The appointment at Downs's City Hall office was with Hodges, who passed each of the councilmen $1,000 in marked bills, wrapped in torn magazine pages. As Hodges left the room, he raised his hat as a signal to police officers hiding in the hallway, and they placed both councilmen under arrest. Murphy was also arrested.

=== Trial ===
On August 25, 1925, the home of Downs's brother Milson W. (Bill) Downs, was "partly wrecked" by a dynamite explosion. Milson confessed to Deputy District Attorney Fitts that he himself had "planted the bomb under his own bed in an effort to work up some much-needed sympathy for his brother." No charges were brought.

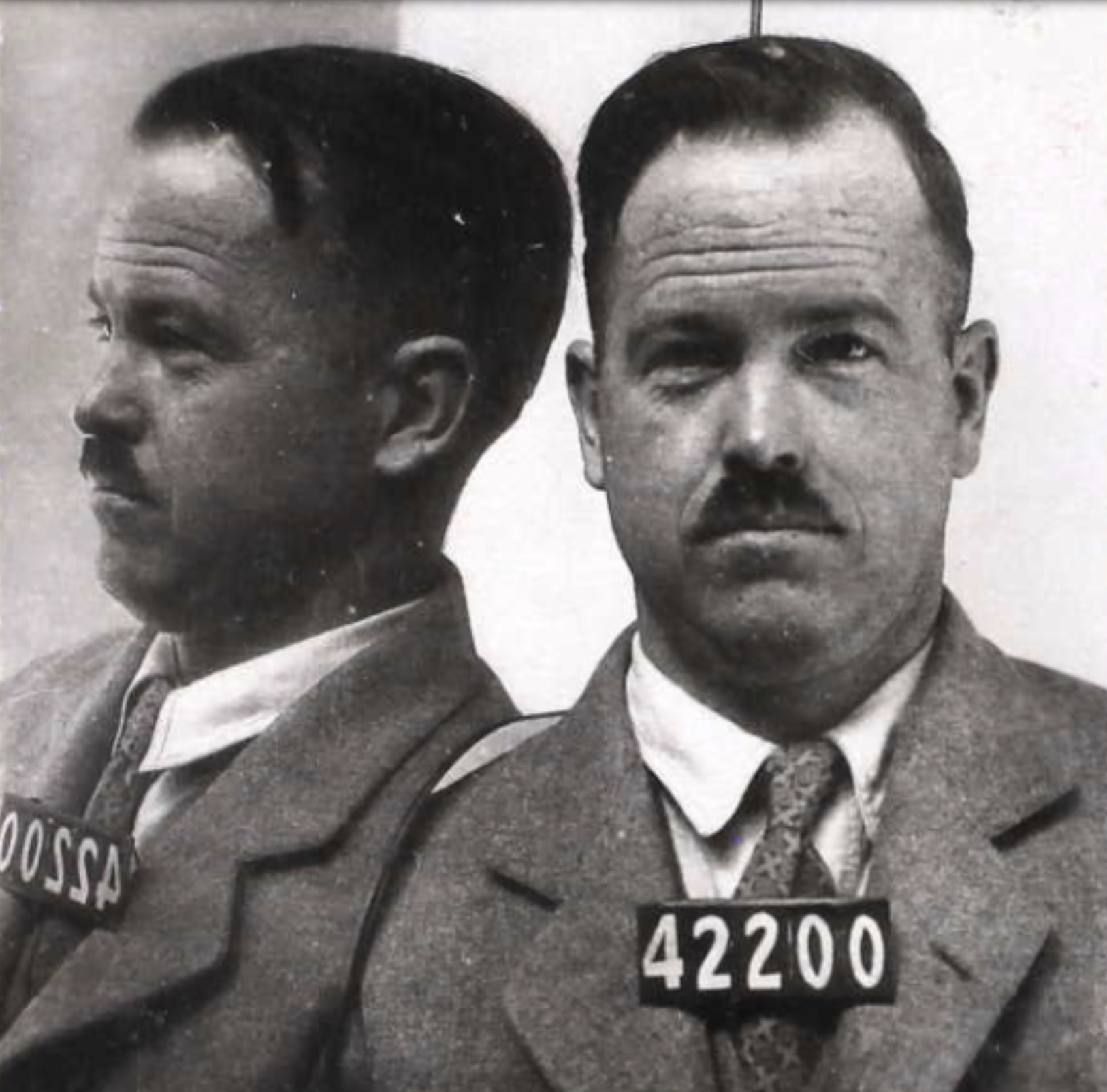
Downs when admitted to San Quentin on May 22, 1926

Both councilmen were suspended from their offices while the trial was going on and were permanently removed upon their conviction in October 1925. Downs testified at trial that he "accepted the money under the impression that it was a belated campaign contribution." After considerable discussion and some changing of votes, the jury unanimously found both Downs and Fitzpatrick guilty of bribery but asked the court to be lenient with them. "This, however, is impossible, as at the last session of the State Legislature a provision was included in the Penal Code denying probation to convicted public officials." The jury acquitted Murphy.

=== Appeal and pardon ===
Downs appealed on the grounds that Murphy's testimony should not have been allowed at trial; the appeal was rejected and Downs was sent to San Quentin but was released on parole at the age of 30 after serving less than two years of a six-year sentence. A group of leading Southern Californians, including Los Angeles Daily News publisher Manchester Boddy, then joined Downs in petitioning Governor James Rolph for a pardon. Rolph granted the pardon on December 24, 1932; Rolph was joined by three Superior Court judges, who said the testimony by Hodges of the Tunnels Transportation Company was "bad." Hodges had been convicted of larceny in Colorado after the Downs trial and was a "fugitive from justice" because he escaped from prison in that state.

=== Later elections ===
In June 1934, Downs filed as a Republican candidate for the 63rd State Assembly District, and in 1947 he ran again in the 10th District against incumbent G. Vernon Bennett, "seeking election as vindication." Bennett won in the April primary with 12,173 votes to 2,834 for Downs and 1,843 for Bertrand R. Bratton (four precincts missing). He tried again in 1951, when he received 1,423 votes, in last place after 5,301 for State Assemblyman Vernon Kilpatrick, 5,077 for musician Charles Navarro, 3,835 for incumbent Bennett and 2,250 for cafe operator George R. Hubbard. His last attempt was in 1953: He came in fourth with 1,385 votes. The other candidates were incumbent Navarro, 14,892; dentist John A. Somerville, 8,316; insurance investigator Ben F. Hayes, 2,781; and realtor Courtland G. Mitchell, 991.

Preceded by District established	Los Angeles City Council; 10th District; 1925	Succeeded by Otto J. Zahn
