= Baldwin Lake =

Baldwin Lake may refer to:

- Baldwin Lake (Los Angeles County, California)
- Baldwin Lake (San Bernardino County, California)
- Baldwin Lake (Anoka County, Minnesota)
- Baldwin Lake (Illinois), Power Plant Cooling Lake
- Baldwin Lake (Waterford Township, Michigan)

== See also ==
- Baldwin Hills Reservoir
