= Otto J. Zahn =

American politician

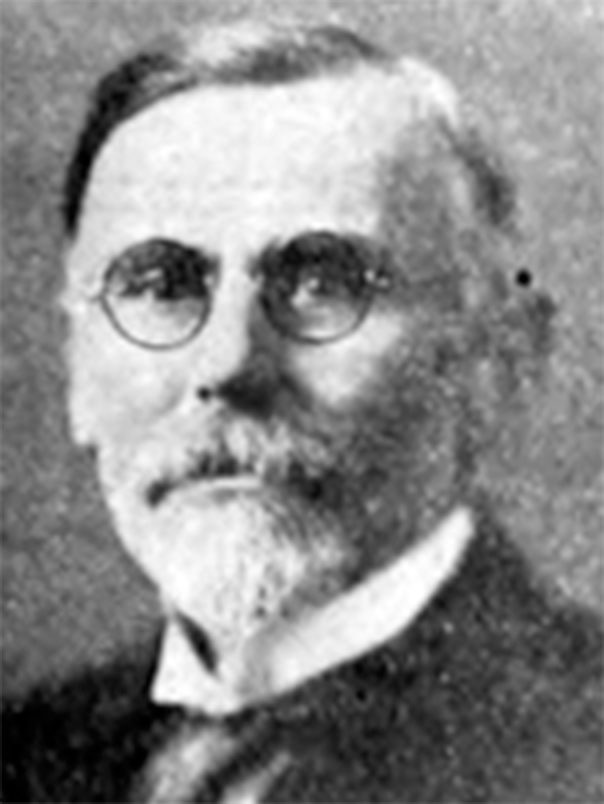
- Zahn in 1926

Member of the Los Angeles City Council for the 10th district
- In office October 23, 1925 – June 30, 1927
- Preceded by: Charles E. Downs
- Succeeded by: E. Snapper Ingram

Personal details
- Born: Otto Johann Zahn; August 23, 1872 Oakland, California
- Died: October 12, 1965 (aged 93) Las Vegas, Nevada
- Party: Republican; Progressive (1934)

Otto Johann Zahn (August 23, 1872 – October 12, 1965) was the second person to represent District 10 on the Los Angeles City Council, serving from 1925 until 1927.

== Biography ==
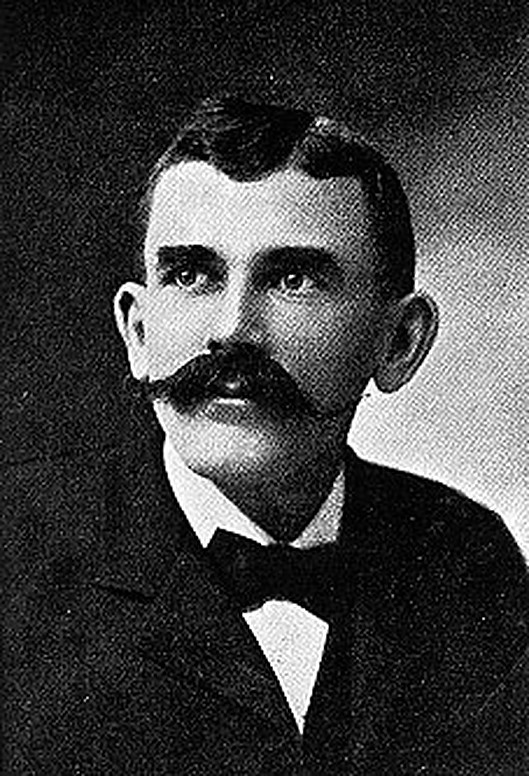
Zahn in 1903

He was born on August 23, 1872, in Oakland, California, to Frances Sharp and Johann Carl Zahn. His father was a wealthy Prussian-born physician who lived in Victoria, Australia, and who moved to San Francisco, California, with his family in 1871. Otto and two brothers, Oscar Carl and Oswald Frances, were born in California.

In 1873 or 1874 the family moved to Los Angeles, where Frances had two more boys, Lorenzo Paul and Hector N. Zahn. Lorenzo, like his brother, later became active in politics, only as a Socialist instead of a Republican. They first lived on Spring Street, then moved in 1890 to 427 South Hope Street on Bunker Hill, where they lived until 1912. The elder Zahn was also a minister, and he financed a church on Spring Street between Fourth and Fifth Streets; it later became the First German Methodist Episcopal Church. He died in October 1901 at the age of 79.

Otto was educated "in private institutions." He raised homing pigeons at 426 South Hope Street and on Santa Catalina Island, where he and his brother Oswald established a messenger service to and from Los Angeles, a distance of some 50 miles. Among other messages, the birds carried news items about the island for publication in the Los Angeles Times.

Zahn was the second husband of Frances May Sproston, whose first husband, Dr. Louis Carleton Harmon, had died. She was active in Los Angeles social and cultural circles. After they married, Zahn moved into her home at 2115 Estrella Avenue. She died in December 1947.

Zahn was a charter member of the City Planning Association and a member of the City Club, California Club, Knights Templar and the California Audubon Society. During WWI he was divisional secretary of the Southern California Four-Minute Men. The organization gave four-minute speeches on topics dealing with the American war effort in the WWI and which were presented during the four minutes between reel-changing in movie theaters.

Zahn, 93, died of a heart attack on October 12, 1965, while vacationing in Las Vegas, Nevada. He was survived by his second wife, Ruth; a stepson, Daniel Curran, and two grandchildren. He was buried at Evergreen Cemetery.

== Public life ==
Zahn was a candidate for the California State Assembly in 1918, running on the Republican ticket, and he was also a member of the city's Humane Animal Commission. He took out his nominating petition for the City Council on March 13, 1919.

At first seen as a dark horse, Zahn was unanimously appointed by the City Council on September 11, 1925, as a substitution in the 10th district for Charles E. Downs, whom the council had suspended after he was indicted on bribery charges. Downs was later convicted and Zahn's temporary appointment was made permanent. In 1927, he lost a bid for election to E. Snapper Ingram. In 1934, Zahn, a registered Progressive, was a candidate for the Republican nomination for Assemblyman in the 55th District against Emory J. Arnold, who had the endorsement of the Times. Arnold won the nomination.

Preceded by Charles E. Downs	Los Angeles City Council; 10th District; 1925–27	Succeeded by E. Snapper Ingram
