= Forty and Eight =

Organization of American veterans

- La Société des 40 Hommes et 8 Chevaux
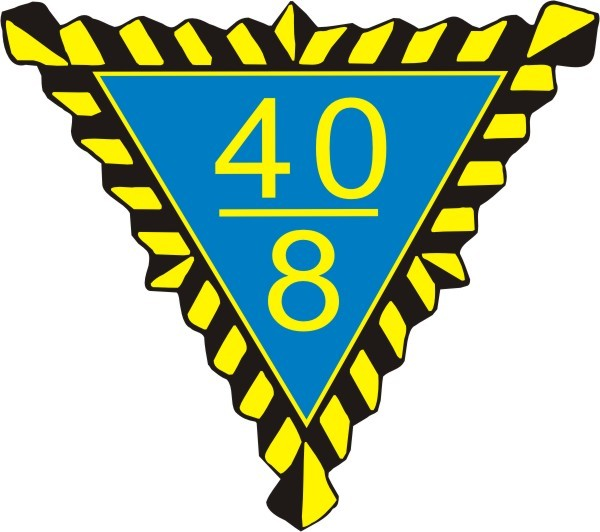
- Emblem
- Abbreviation: 40–8
- Named after: Forty and Eight
- Formation: March 1920 (106 years ago)
- Founder: Joseph W. Breen
- Founded at: Philadelphia, Pennsylvania
- Type: 501(c)(19), veterans' organization
- Tax ID no.: 35-0732710
- Headquarters: 1635 Hawthorne Dr, Plainfield, Indiana
- Coordinates: 39.8252874°N 86.1525609°W
- Region served: Worldwide
- Official language: English
- Chef de Chemin de Fer: Jim Vissers
- Correspondant National: Ronald W. Rolfes, Jr.
- Affiliations: La Societe de Femme
- Website: fortyandeight.org

La Société des 40 Hommes et 8 Chevaux (English: "The Society of 40 Men and 8 Horses"), commonly known as the Forty and Eight, is a patriotic organization of U.S. veterans headquartered in Indianapolis, Indiana. It is made up of state, U.S. territory, and overseas grande, and these are in turn made up of locale. It was founded in March 1920 at Philadelphia, Pennsylvania, as an honor society of The American Legion, by World War I veteran, and Legionnaire, Joseph W. Breen.

== History ==
The Forty and Eight was founded in March, 1920, in Philadelphia, Pennsylvania, when World War I veteran Joseph W. Breen and 15 other members of The American Legion came together and organized it as an honor society for the Legion. They envisioned a new and different level of elite membership and camaraderie for leaders of the Legion.

The organization derives its name from the French Army box cars used to transport American soldiers to the western front during World War I. Each car had "40–8" stenciled on the side, which meant that it could carry 40 men or 8 horses. The cars were known as "forty and eights" and viewed by the men as a miserable way to travel. The new organization was thus called the Forty and Eight in an attempt to make light of the common misery they had all shared.

In 1929 it was described as "the fun-making organization of The American Legion".

In 1959 the Forty and Eight became independent of The American Legion when National Commander Martin B. McKneally discontinued it as an organization within the Legion for having racially discriminatory membership requirements. In 1973 the Forty and Eight modified their membership rules to prohibit discrimination. The organization required its members to also be members of the Legion until 2008.

== Eligibility ==
Membership is by invitation only and open to honorably discharged veterans and active members of the Armed Forces of the United States per a 2008 change to Article IV of the national constitution. Wartime service is not required.

From the beginning, the Forty and Eight only allowed men into its ranks, even though many women were veterans in their own right and thus, could have been eligible. But that changed at the promenade nationale in 2006, when the majority of delegates present voted to allow women into the ranks for the first time.

== Activities ==
The Forty and Eight is involved in several charitable causes.

=== Child welfare ===
The Forty and Eight's first program was designed to provide care and scholarships for the children of servicemen not returning home after World War I. Today; the Child Welfare program is mostly involved with providing help for any family with children under 18 that have been devastated by some disaster.

=== Nurses' training ===
The Forty and Eight provides scholarships to people desiring to become nurses under the Nurses' Training program. A prospective nurse need not be a military veteran to receive aid under this program.

=== Youth sports ===
The Forty and Eight also helps to finance sports programs for children who are disadvantaged in some way, such as through mental or physical challenges or lack of money. People who receive this aid need not be military veterans.

=== The Carville Star ===
As one of their ongoing programs, the Forty and Eight offers continuing support of the publication, "The Carville Star," which disseminates the information regarding the research into Hansen's Disease (Leprosy) taking place in Baton Rouge, Louisiana. There they have been successful in isolating, controlling and soon, through their research, the development of a vaccine to prevent Hansen's Disease. "The Star" is published at the former United States Public Health Service Hospital located in Carville, Louisiana. This patient-published publication carries the research works of not only this center, but those of the rest of the world, and is translated into and forwarded to 128 countries in addition to a circulation of more than 60,000 in the United States.

== Organization ==
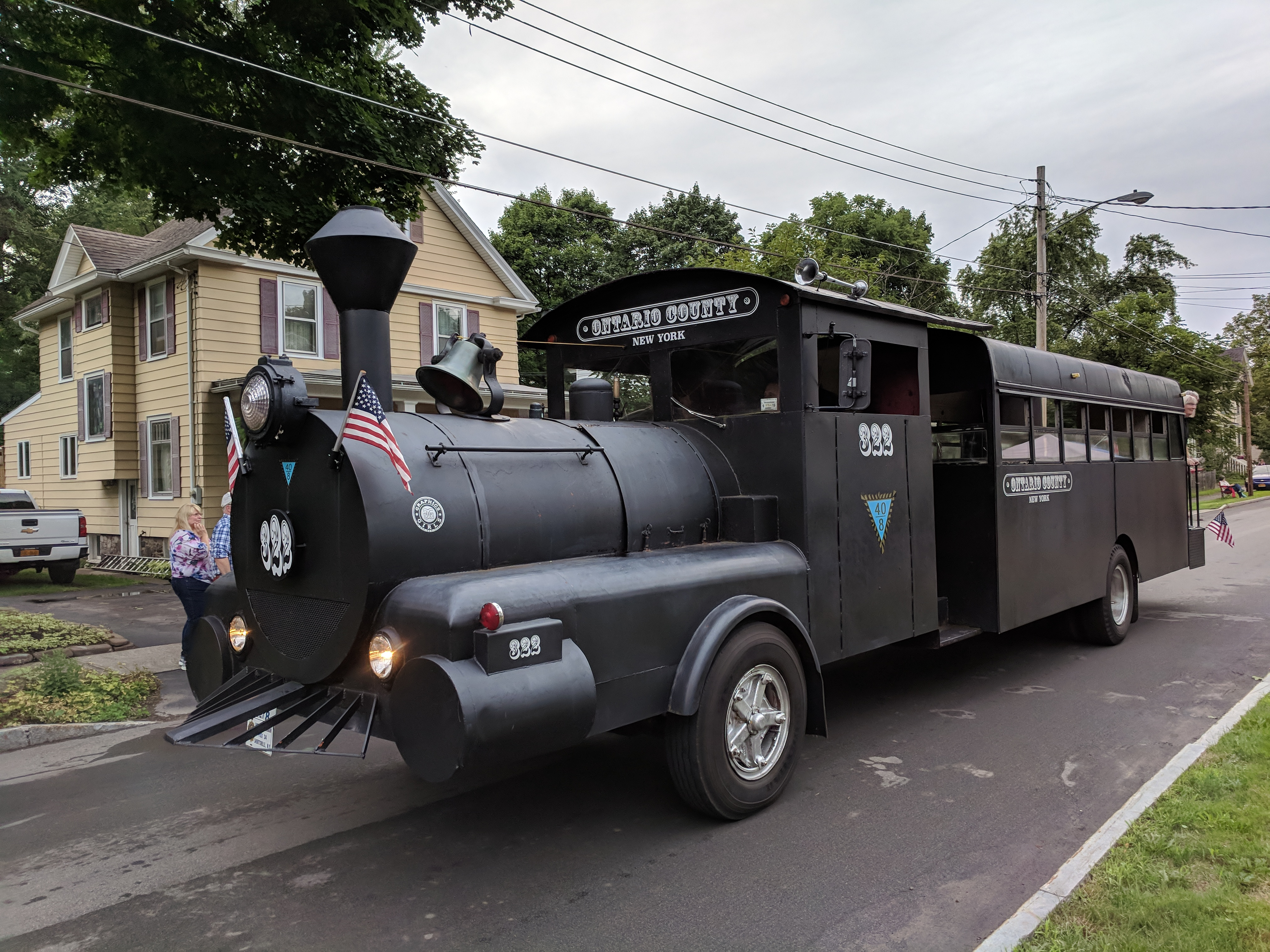
Forty and Eight railroad float, a locomotive on rubber tires owned by the 40–8 voiture at Shortsville, New York, drives in the parade for the Wayne County Fair on August 17th, 2018.

The local unit of the Forty and Eight is the voiture. It often covers a specific county or American Legion post. Above that is the grande. Each state has its own grande, as well as the District of Columbia, and there are grandes for Mexico, France, Latin America and several other locations where U.S. veterans make their homes abroad. The Forty and Eight headquarters is located in Indianapolis, Indiana. Forty and Eight members refer to each other as voyageurs, in that all members have shared the demands and hardship of military service and have taken the same journey. They are also known as "Forty and Eighters".

The Forty and Eight is down significantly in membership numbers compared to years past, but it is still very much in existence with a membership of about 21,000 in 2019.

Although the Forty and Eight is not a secret society, much of the ritual is a secret to non-members. A voyageur can disclose that they belong to said organization, but not all of what goes on at its meetings. The Forty and Eight meeting is known as a promenade and has its own set ritual.

The ceremony to initiate a new member, known as a P.G. for Poor Goof or Prisoner de Gare into the 40 & 8 is known as a "wreck". Anyone wishing to enter The Forty and Eight must be wrecked, after which the initiate has earned the right to be referred to as a voyageur militair and a full member.

The Forty and Eight as a whole is divided into regions. These regions follow geographical lines and each region encompasses multiple states. For example, the Central States includes Colorado, Iowa, Kansas, Nebraska, Missouri, Oklahoma, and Texas. The MinnDakota region includes Minnesota, North Dakota and South Dakota. Other regions include Heart of Dixie and Northwest, which includes, among others, Wyoming and New Mexico.

== Notable members ==
Notable members of the veterans' organization have included:

- Lonnie O. Aulds – Louisiana state representative
- Wally Barron – Governor of West Virginia
- Prescott Bush – United States senator
- Charles G. Dawes – 30th vice president of the United States
- E. Snapper Ingram – Los Angeles City councilman
- William T. Sullivan – Wisconsin state assemblyman
- Harry S. Truman – 33rd president of the United States
- Roscoe Turner – American air racer and balloonist
- Richard B. Wigglesworth – 6th United States ambassador to Canada

== See also ==
- List of veterans' organizations
