= Baldwin Vista, Los Angeles =

Baldwin Vista
- Neighborhood of Los Angeles
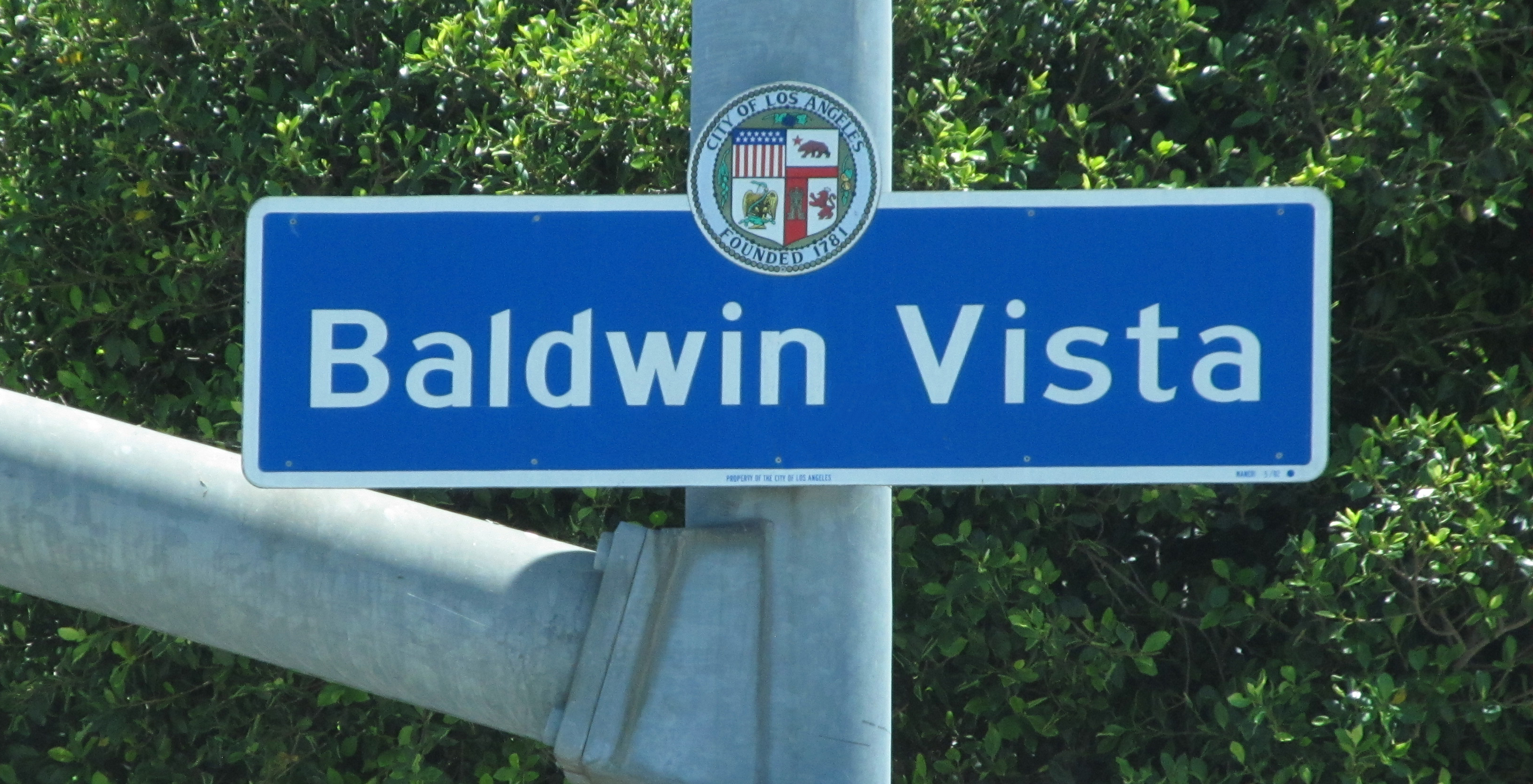
- Baldwin Vista neighborhood sign located at the southwest corner of La Brea Avenue and Coliseum Street

- Location within Western Los Angeles
- Coordinates: 34.0060°N 118.3624°W
- Country: United States
- State: California
- County: County of Los Angeles
- City: City of Los Angeles

Population (2010)
  - Total: 9,984
- ZIP Code: 90008
- Area code: 323

Baldwin Vista is a neighborhood located next to the Baldwin Hills Mountains in the South region of the city of Los Angeles, California. It is located in the western Baldwin Hills, and partially borders on Culver City.

== Geography ==
The Baldwin Vista neighborhood is bounded by La Cienega Boulevard to the west, La Brea Avenue to the east, Coliseum Street to the north, and Kenneth Hahn Park to the south.

== History ==
Baldwin Vista is part of what was once Rancho La Ciénega ó Paso de la Tijera, later owned by Lucky Baldwin. Developed in 1954, houses originally cost $35,000 to $50,000. Real-estate ads read "If yours is the long view ahead, you'll know the perfect site for your family's home-for-keeps when you see it at Baldwin Hills Vista, where the view's long, the air's fresh, and the value is enduring."

In 2022, LAist noted that Baldwin Vista is a "part of a collection of affluent wealthy and middle-class areas including Baldwin Hills Estates, Ladera Heights, Baldwin Vista, and especially View Park" that are known as "The Black Beverly Hills."

== Notable people ==
- Karen Bass - Former U.S. representative for California's 33rd congressional district and current Mayor of Los Angeles.
- Heather Hutt - Los Angeles's 10th City Council district representative.

== See also ==
- List of districts and neighborhoods in Los Angeles
