= G. Vernon Bennett =

American politician (1880–1968)

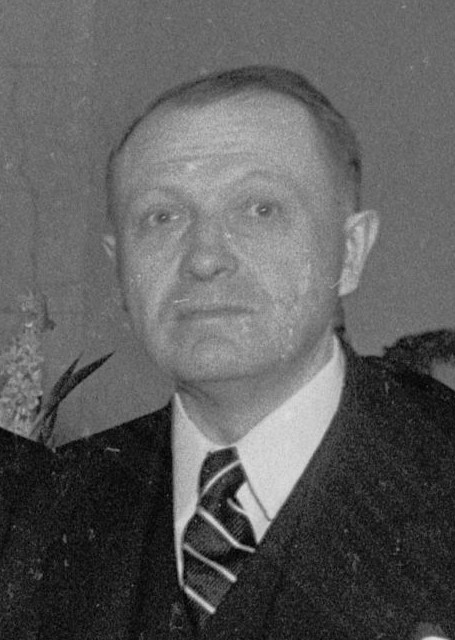
- Bennett in 1935

Member of the Los Angeles City Council for the 10th district
- In office July 1, 1935 – June 30, 1951
- Preceded by: E. Snapper Ingram
- Succeeded by: Charles Navarro

President of the Los Angeles City Council
- In office July 1, 1941 – June 30, 1943
- Preceded by: Robert L. Burns
- Succeeded by: Robert L. Burns

Personal details
- Born: February 17, 1880 Waverly, Iowa
- Died: July 31, 1968 (aged 88) Pasadena, California
- Party: Democratic

Guy Vernon Bennett (February 17, 1880 – July 31, 1968) was superintendent of schools in Pomona, a professor of education at the University of Southern California, and a Los Angeles city councilman from the 10th District from 1935 to 1951. He was defeated for reelection after seventeen years in office in the wake of his arrest on a morals charge. He was a Democrat.

== Biography ==
Bennett was born in Waverly, Iowa, on February 17, 1880. He had five siblings, Edward Allen Bennett of Los Angeles, Richard Bennett of Tacoma, Washington, Belle Campbell of Guelph, Ontario, Zellia Campbell of Los Angeles and William M. Bennett. Bennett was married and had at least one son. He was a Kiwanian.

While a city councilman, Bennett, then 65, was taken into custody in Lincoln Park on October 2, 1950, by two police officers who "took a statement from him at the Highland Park Police Station." A complaint was later issued by the city attorney's office "charging two morals counts." Bennett pleaded guilty to disturbing the peace," and a charge of lewd vagrancy was dismissed "in the interests of justice." He paid a fine of $100.

Bennett, who was then living in Pasadena, died July 31, 1968, at the age of 88.

== Educational career ==
Bennett was working in Gridley, California, before taking up his position as superintendent of schools in Pomona in July 1914, replacing the retiring schools chief, W.P. Murphy. Near the end of his first school year, he responded to a statement by the University of California President Benjamin Ide Wheeler, who had declared vocational training to be "an attempt at aristocracy to keep children of the laborer in the working class so they couldn't better themselves." Bennett said:

That sort of talk is bosh. ... If teaching boys how to do interior decorating, plumbing, lathe work and cabinet-making and teaching girls how to make hats and dresses and custard pies is an aristocratic attempt to tie a millstone around the neck of genius, then let us become more aristocratic. If we can keep the boys and girls off the street and reduce the number of street-corner loafers by teaching some useful trades in our schools I think it is our duty to do so.

Bennett ordained an anti-slang week in April 1915 and ordered that anybody who used slang in Pomona schools be penalized. "I'd like to eliminate such phrases as 'hand somebody a lemon,' 'cut it out,' 'the once-over,' and a lot of similar expressions," he said.

In 1919 he was appointed head of the local office of the Federal Board for Vocational Education, an agency that retrained returning U.S. servicemen. In October 1920, Bennett and Nicholas Ricciardi, director of the vocational office in San Francisco, were attacked by the James B. Gresham Post No. 3, Veterans of Foreign Wars, for, among other things, "repressive measures." A statement charged Bennett with being "out of harmony with every man engaged in Federal board work in this city."

Bennett, who held a doctorate of philosophy, was hired to be an associate professor of education at the University of Southern California, effective in the fall semester, 1926.

== Political career ==
1934–35
Bennett attempted a run for the State Superintendent of Public Instruction in 1934 but lost. In February 1935, still a college professor and living at 3017-1/2 Hoover, he took out a nomination petition for the City Council seat in the 10th District, campaigning against the incumbent, E. Snapper Ingram. Bennett was supported by the End Poverty in California movement (EPIC) and opposed by the Los Angeles Times. Other candidates in the 10th District primaries were Lenna G. Walradt, a lecturer; Allan M. Rose, employed by the Civilian Conservation Corps, Karl Euper, "in the insurance and real estate business," and Austin L. Tournoux, "in the publishing business"; he had been a member of the California State Assembly in 1933. Bennett received 5,974 votes to Ingram's 5,810, and they faced each other in the finals. In that race, Bennett won by a vote of 8,794 to 8,064.

1937
In 1937 Bennett ran as an incumbent against George McLain but without the support of EPIC. He won in the primary, 8,065 to 5,306.

1938–39
He lost in another bid for state superintendent of public instruction in 1938. Bennett was known for supporting "liberal" measures in the city council and had the support of Mayor Fletcher Bowron and activist Clifford Clinton; he was concentrating on issues of slum clearance and supported the thirty dollars every Thursday movement. He was the only council member to vote against an April 1939 resolution urging the Dies Committee on Un-American Activities to investigate Communist influence in Los Angeles "as soon as possible." That month he won in the primary election, 9,526 votes to 2,192 for Willard E. Badham, 1,620 for Solly F. Smith and 804 for Allan M. Rose.

1941
In 1941, Bennett faced S. Frederic Smith (the Times choice) and Mary A. Van Dame. Bennett won, 9,287 votes against 3,806 for Smith and 1,071 for Van Dame. By that time, Bennett had joined the "anti-Bowron bloc," and when the city council was reorganized in July, he was elected president of the council by a vote of 9 to 6, replacing Robert L. Burns. As council president, he became acting mayor when Bowron was out of town.

1942–43
Bennett was elected chairman of the Los Angeles County Democratic Central Committee in September 1942, unseating Claude L. Welch.

In late 1941, political reformer Clifford E. Clinton had accused Bennett, with other councilmen, of having misused city automobiles, asking for a grand jury investigation. The issue resurfaced in 1943, an election year, when Council Member Parley P. Christensen accused Bennett of having used a city automobile for an "unauthorized and illegal" trip to Vancouver, British Columbia, in 1937 and on his return, "presenting the city with a bill for gasoline and oil." Bennett denied the charge. In the 1943 election, Bennett was endorsed by the Times, which said that "Although inclined when first elected toward ultra-liberal views, years of practical experience have tempered Bennett's convictions." Bennett won the election in the primary, 5,510 votes to 3,718 for Vernon Kilpatrick and 1,573 for George W. Barnard.

1944–1945
Bennett made news in January 1944 when he urged that a woman be appointed to a vacancy on the Water and Power Commission, though "he had no particular person in mind."

He was re-elected at the primary in April 1945 by 12,207 votes to 2,327 for William L. Biber, a "well-to-do used-car lot owner taking his first fling at politics." Bennett was endorsed by the Times.

1947–1949
The 1947 election was highlighted by a Los Angeles Times attack on Bennett's championing of a police union, but despite that and an accusation that he had appeared "as the supporter of radical movements or legislation." the Times endorsed him over his opponents — Bertrand R. Bratton, a certified public accountant, and Charles Downs, a builder who had been a City Council member in 1925 but was removed from office that year upon conviction of receiving a bribe from a developer. Bennett won in the April primary with 12,173 votes to 2,834 for Downs and 1,843 for Bratton (four precincts not reported). Two years later, in 1949, Bennett was reelected without opposition.

1951
In 1951, running in the shadow of a morals charge (above) and deprived of a Los Angeles Times endorsement, Bennett was defeated for reelection after seventeen years in office. In the primary, he came in third with 3,835 votes, compared to 5,301 for State Assemblyman Vernon Kilpatrick and 5,077 for musician Charles Navarro. Cafe operator George R. Hubbard had 2,250 votes and Charles Downs, running for the last time for his old seat, had 1,423. Bennett sued Navarro on the grounds that the latter "did not give his full name as Charles Navarro Guarino," but the case was dismissed by Superior Judge Joseph W. Vickers. Bennett's last major vote in the council was on June 26, 1951, in favor of federally subsidized housing projects.

== Publications ==
Books
Sources: Library of Congress Online Catalog and Amazon.com

- Junior High School, 1919, 1926
- Debate Questions on U.S. History, 1918
- A Primer of School Finance, before 1923
- Problems of the Elementary School Principal, 1928
- Social Civics, 1928
- Vocational Education of Junior College Grade, 1928
- Occupational Exploratory Courses for Junior High School (Grades 7, 8, 9), co-editor, 1929
- Legalistic Pursuits, 1931
- Occupational Orientation, co-editor, 1931
- Exploring the World of Work; a Guidebook to Occupations, co-author, 1937
- Grant to Eisenhower; Political Giveaways Unlimited, 1956

Newspaper article

- Gadsden Won His Purchase, But His Railroad Waited," Los Angeles Times, January 15, 1953, page A-5

Preceded by E. Snapper Ingram	Los Angeles City Council; 10th District; 1935–51	Succeeded by Charles Navarro
Preceded by Robert L. Burns	President of the Los Angeles City Council; 1941–43	Succeeded by Robert L. Burns
