= 2nd Street Tunnel =

Los Angeles street tunnel commonly depicted in photographs and media

Coordinates: 34.0558°N 118.2519°W

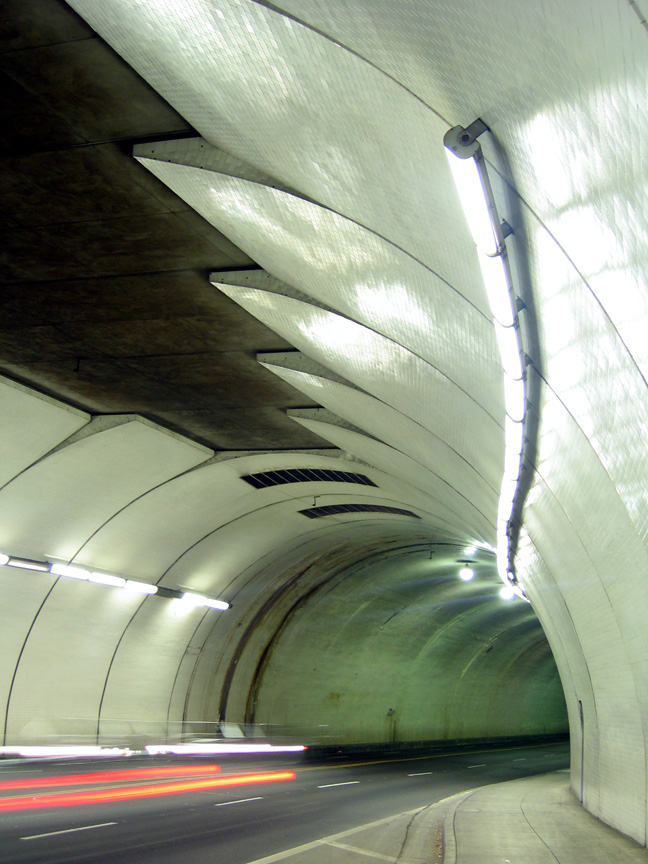
- The west entrance

Overview
- Location: Downtown Los Angeles
- Route: 2nd Street
- Crosses: Bunker Hill
- Start: Figueroa Street (Northwest end)
- End: Hill Street (Southeast end)

Operation
- Opened: July 25, 1924; 102 years ago

Technical
- Length: 1,550 feet (470 m)
- Tunnel clearance: 12.75 feet (3.89 m)

The 2nd Street Tunnel is a widely filmed and photographed tunnel on 2nd Street under Bunker Hill in Downtown Los Angeles, California. The Los Angeles Times described it as "the most recognizable city landmark most Americans have never heard of". It is 1,500 ft (460 m) long and lined with glossy white-glazed tiles that act similarly to a photographic light box and provide visually interesting, distorted reflections of things placed in it.

The tunnel was built to relieve congestion on the earlier 3rd Street Tunnel. Construction began in 1916 and was completed in 1924, with its formal opening on July 25 of that year. The distinctive white tiles, which give the tunnel its glow, came from Germany, which caused controversy at the time due to Anti-German sentiment at the onset of World War I.

The tunnel runs from South Figueroa Street at the northwest to Hill Street at the southeast. 2nd Street also runs above for two blocks at the surface from Hill Street at the southwest to South Hope Street.

The two entrances are very different in character, automotive columnist Dan Neil describing the contrast of "the grittier east entrance and the glowing aperture of the west side, with flaring buttresses reminiscent of the shell of the Hollywood Bowl."

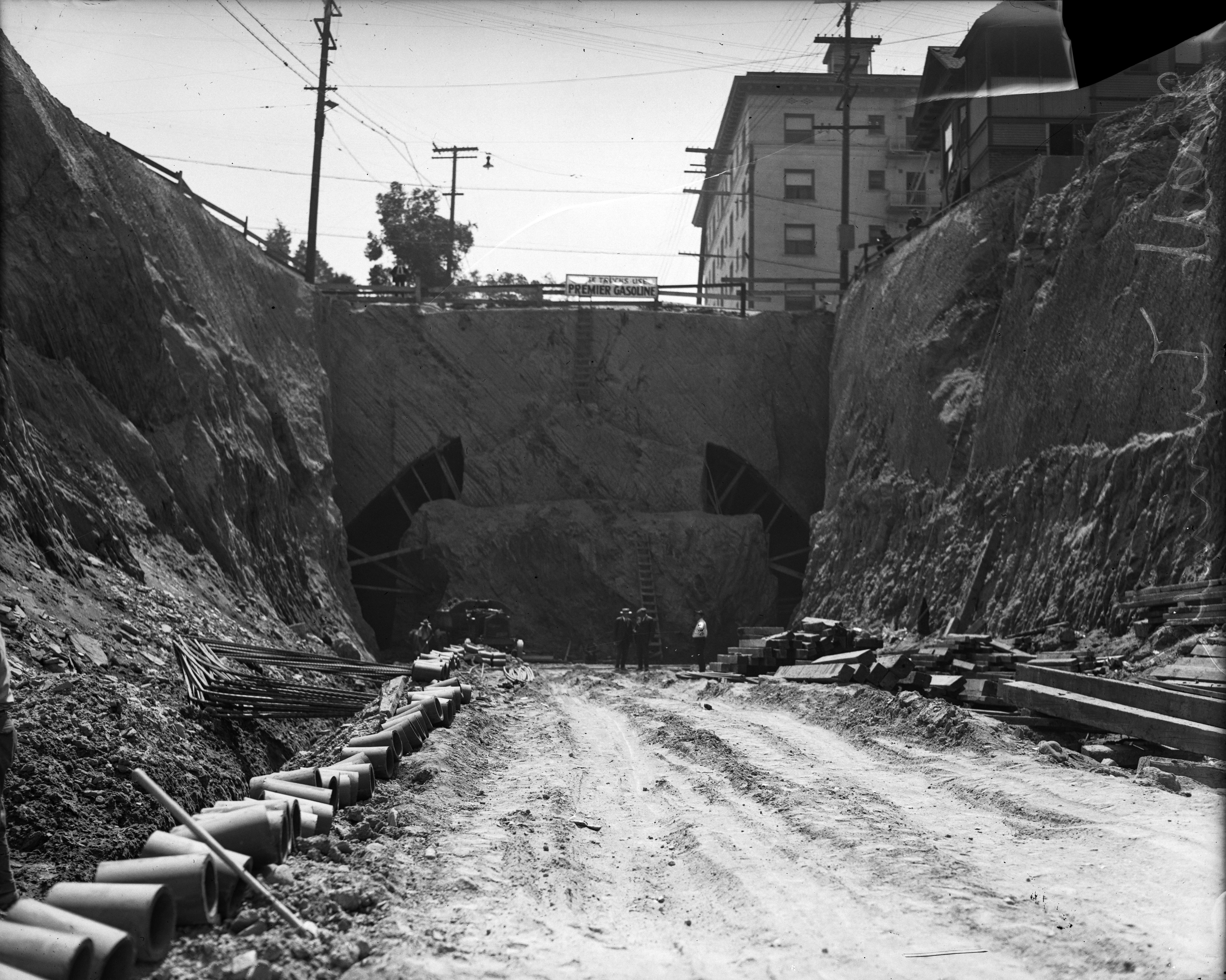
Before the boring of the tunnel, from the Figueroa Street end, 1921

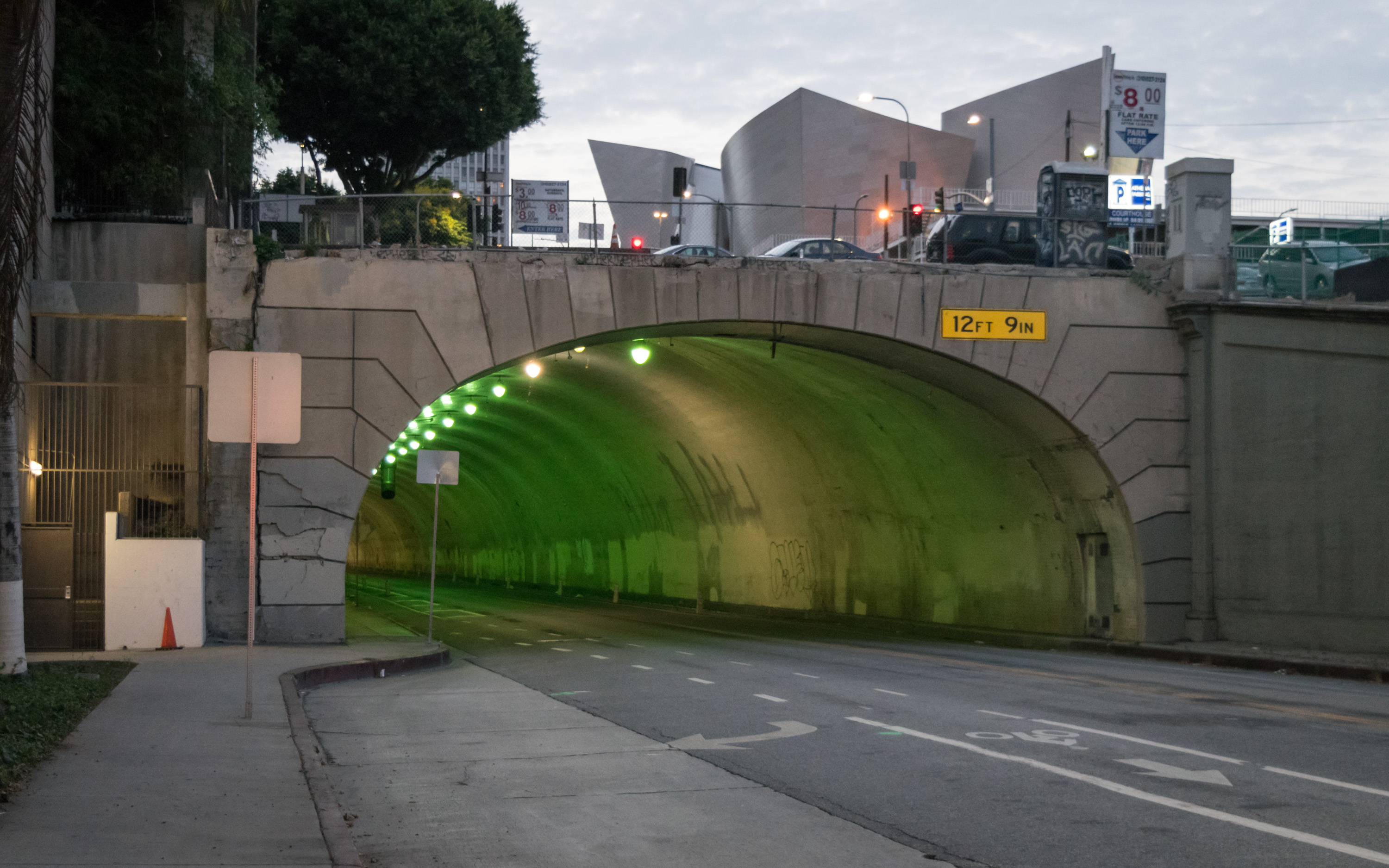
Hill Street entrance

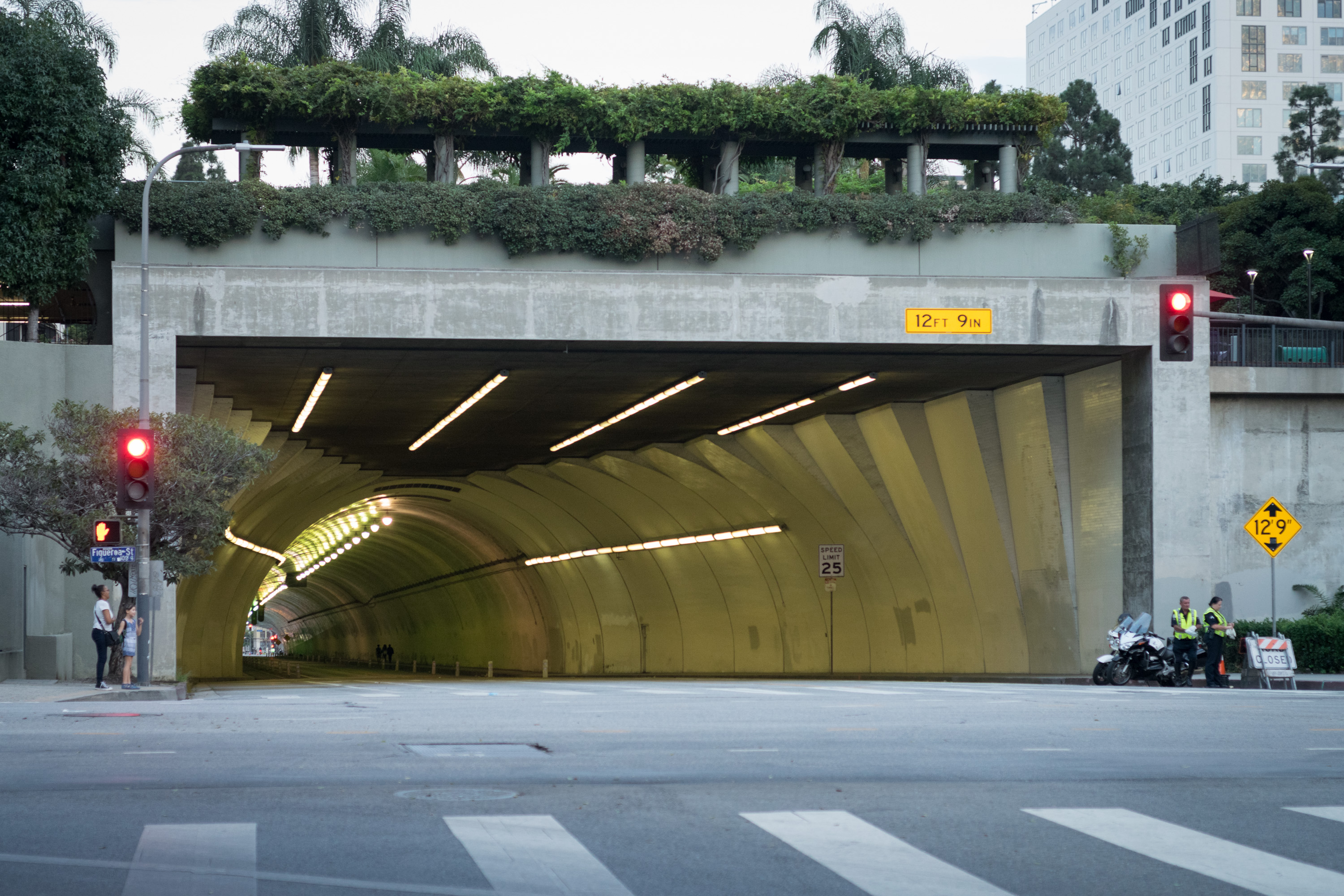
Figueroa Street entrance

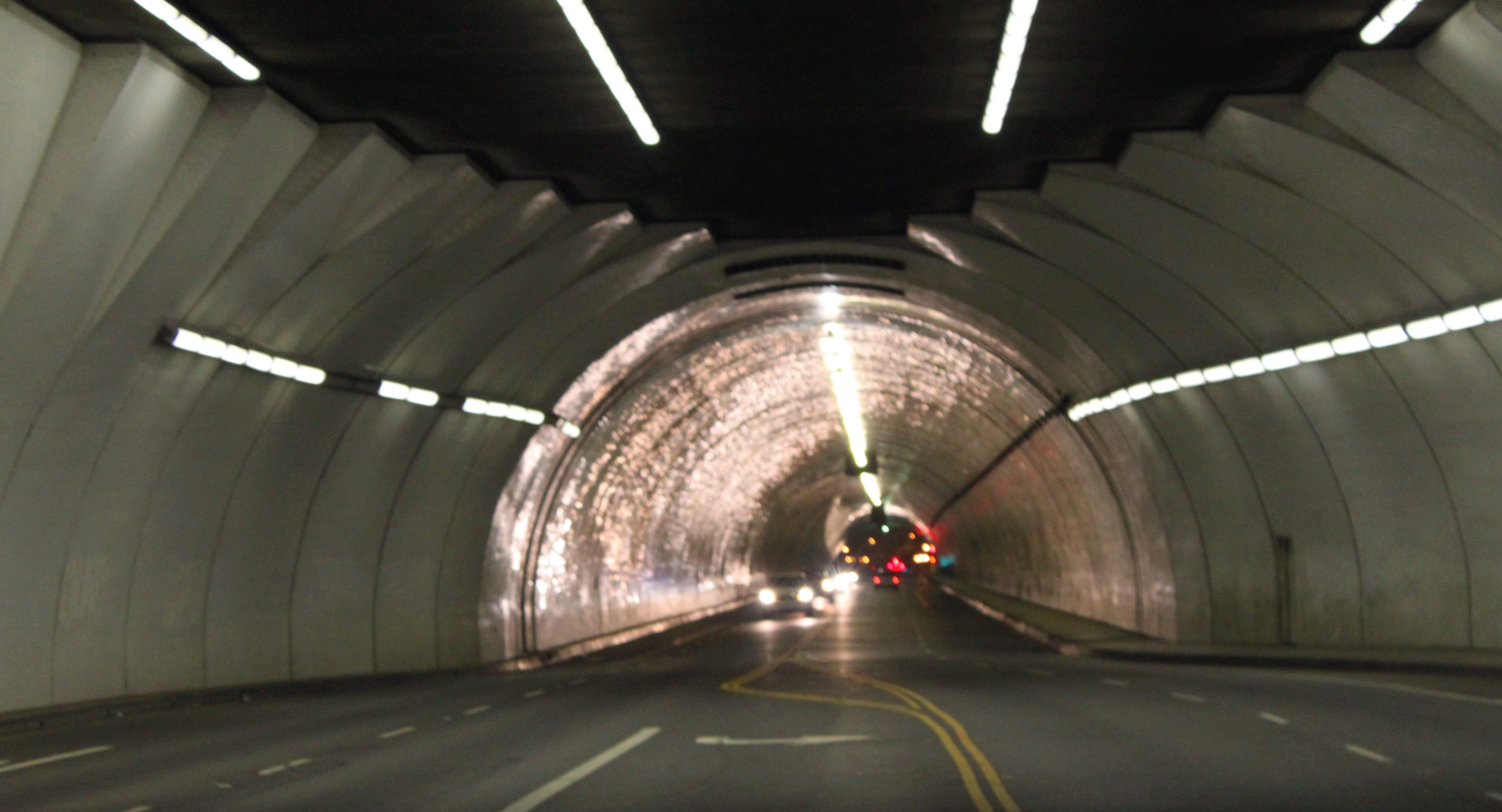
The tunnel

== Traffic ==
The tunnel has two-way traffic. It previously had four lanes (two in each direction), but in late 2013 a bike lane in each direction was added, resulting in one car lane and one bike lane in each direction.

== In popular culture ==
The tunnel appears frequently in car advertisements from many manufacturers. Seventy-three car ads were filmed in the tunnel from 2006 to 2008, averaging more than two per month.

The tunnel has appeared in many movies, including The Student Nurses (1970), The Terminal Man (1974), The Driver (1978), When a Stranger Calls (1979), Blade Runner (1982), Flashdance (1983), The Terminator (1984), Repo Man (1984), Rocky IV (1985), Lethal Weapon 2 (1989), Sneakers (1992), Deep Cover (1992), Demolition Man (1993), Independence Day (1996), Money Talks (1997), Con Air (1997), Gattaca (1997), Enemy of the State (1998), Kill Bill (2003), Transformers (2007), Kill Speed (2010), Black November (2012), and Knight of Cups (2015).

The 2nd Street tunnel has been featured in music videos such as "Iris" by Goo Goo Dolls, "It’s Over Now" by Neve, "We R Who We R" by Kesha, "It's My Life" by Bon Jovi, "Kings and Queens" by Thirty Seconds to Mars, "Grenade" by Bruno Mars, "Sing" by My Chemical Romance, "Protovision" by Kavinsky, "Bet" by Tinashe, "Feel Good" by Gryffin and Illenium featuring Daya, "Narcissist" by Halo Circus, "Please Me" by Bruno Mars and Cardi B, "You Can't Stop The Girl" by Bebe Rexha and "Blinding Lights" by The Weeknd. It was also used in the artwork for Luna Sea's album Shine.

The tunnel has also been used for fashion shows, including the 2004 LA Fashion Week show by designer Michelle Mason, and for parties, such as the 2013 Golden Globe Awards the Art of Elysium/Audi party.

== See also ==
- J. Win Austin, Los Angeles, California, City Council member, 1941–43, condemned auto-horn noise in tunnel
- Charles E. Downs, City Council member convicted in a bribery scheme involving a "moving sidewalk" in the tunnel
