= Robert L. Burns =

American politician

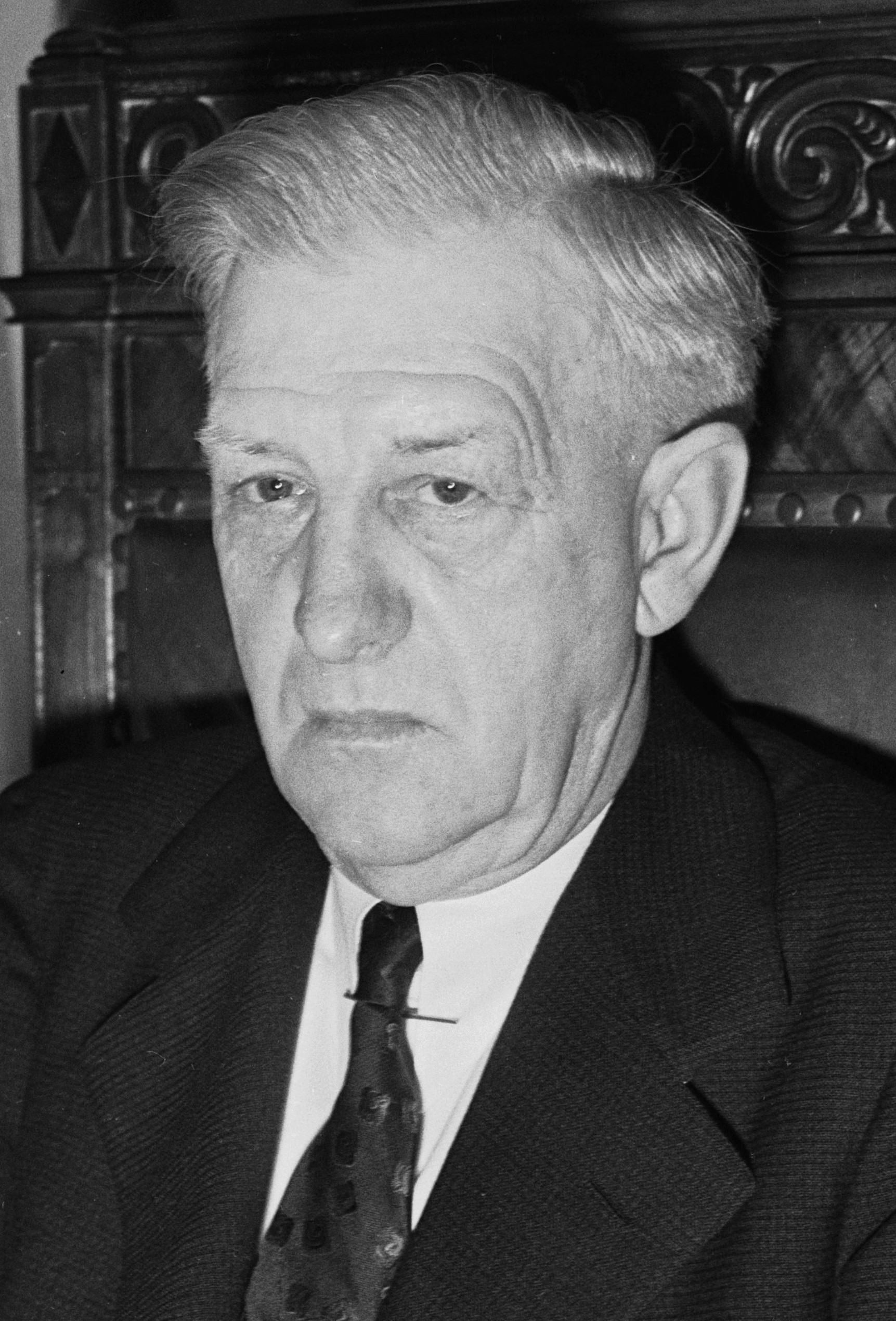
- Burns in 1935

President of the Los Angeles City Council
- In office July 1, 1935 – June 30, 1941
- Preceded by: Howard W. Davis
- Succeeded by: G. Vernon Bennett
- In office July 1, 1943 – June 30, 1945
- Preceded by: G. Vernon Bennett
- Succeeded by: Harold A. Henry

Member of the Los Angeles City Council from the 4th district
- In office July 1, 1929 – June 30, 1945
- Preceded by: William M. Hughes
- Succeeded by: Harold A. Henry

Personal details
- Born: January 12, 1876; Knoxville, Iowa, U.S.
- Died: March 17, 1955 (aged 79); Los Angeles, California
- Political party: Republican

Robert Louis Burns (January 12, 1876 – March 17, 1955) was an American politician, attorney, and businessman who served as a member of the Los Angeles school board from 1923 to 1929 and the Los Angeles City Council from 1929 to 1945. At the time of his death in 1955, he was described as a local "elder statesman."

== Early life ==
Burns was born January 12, 1876, in Knoxville, Iowa, the son of William E. Burns of Erie, Pennsylvania, and Dulcina Elizabeth French of Indiana. He had three brothers. He graduated from high school in Hutchinson, Kansas.

== Career ==
He later became a lawyer and worked as the business manager of The Hutchinson News. He also engaged in coal mining and the telephone business.

He and a brother began a flour mill that grew into the Consolidated Flour Mills of Kansas, His company was the first in the nation to introduce the eight-hour day for mill employees. In 1916, he retired and moved to Los Angeles, where he joined the Los Angeles Country Club. Burns was a Presbyterian and a Republican.

== Politics ==
=== Kansas ===
Burns was on the school board in Hutchinson, Kansas, for five years. (Note: The Los Angeles Times reported in its 1955 obituary of Burns that he had served in the Kansas Legislature, but the Kansas State Library said in 2011 that there was no record of a Robert Burns having been a member there before 1915.)

=== Los Angeles ===
Burns first ran for election to the Los Angeles Board of Education in May 1923, when he came in thirteenth in a field of twenty, a sufficiently high result to be nominated for election to the seven-member board. In the final vote in June, he was third and was elected. He was reelected in 1925 and 1927 but announced in January 1929 that he would run for the City Council.

As a school board member, he attended the unveiling of a portrait of the late school superintendent Susan Miller Dorsey in 1929 and cast one of the favorable votes the same year to purchase the surplus property of the University of California, Los Angeles campus on Vermont Avenue to be used by Los Angeles City College.

==== City Council ====
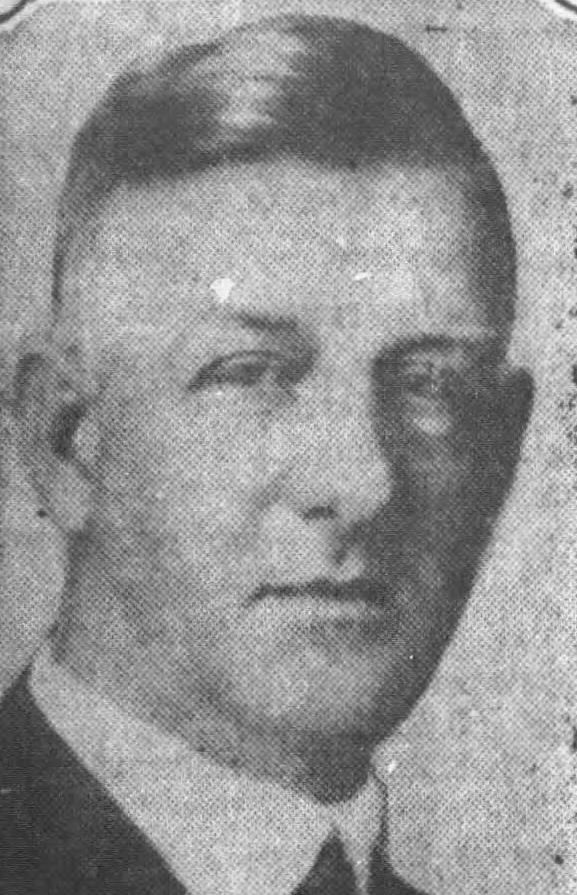
Burns in 1923

Burns was first elected to represent the 4th District on the City Council in 1929, was repeatedly reelected for sixteen years, and for half of that time was the council president, serving as acting mayor when the mayor himself was out of the state. Known as an opponent of "radicals and subversives," Burns was opposed in his candidacy in 1935 by James A. Farley, postmaster-general of the United States and chairman of the national Democratic Party, in telegrams sent to two council members.

In January 1930, Burns and seven other council members who had voted in favor of granting a rock-crushing permit in the Santa Monica Mountains were unsuccessfully targeted for recall on the grounds that the eight "have conspired with Alphonzo Bell, Samuel Traylor and Chapin A. Day, all multi-millionaires, to grant this group a special spot zoning permit to crush and ship from the high-class residential section of Santa Monica, limestone and rock for cement."

Burns was one of the six council members who in July 1931 lost a vote to appeal a judge's decision ordering an end to racial restrictions in city-operated swimming pools. The pools had previously been restricted by race to certain days or hours.

Burns was appointed to the Water and Power Commission in 1945 and subsequently to the Recreation and Park Commission. He headed the Coliseum Commission in 1947. A city park in Windsor Square at Beverly Boulevard and Van Ness Avenue was named after him in 1959.

== Personal life ==
Burns was married to Sarah Bertram of Kentucky on October 11, 1898; they had four sons, William B., Robert J., Harry F. and John A.

Burns died March 17, 1955, in his home at 672 South Serrano Avenue, between Wilshire Boulevard and Seventh Street. He was buried in Inglewood Park Cemetery.

== Notes ==
Preceded by William M. Hughes	Los Angeles City Council; 4th District; 1929–45	Succeeded by Harold A. Henry
Preceded by Howard W. Davis	President of the Los Angeles City Council; 1935–41; 1943-45	Succeeded by G. Vernon Bennett
Preceded by G. Vernon Bennett	President of the Los Angeles City Council; 1935–41; 1943-45	Succeeded by George H. Moore
