= Los Angeles's 10th City Council district =

American legislative district

Councilmember
Heather Hutt; D–Baldwin Vista
since April 11, 2023
- Demographics: 10.2% White; 28.0% Black; 44.1% Hispanic; 14.7% Asian; 0.3% Other
- Population (2022): 270,520
- Registered voters (2017): 130,273
- Website: cd10.lacity.gov

Los Angeles's 10th City Council district is one of the fifteen districts in the Los Angeles City Council. It is currently represented by Democrat Heather Hutt since 2022, after previous member Herb Wesson was barred from serving on an interim basis in place of suspended member Mark Ridley-Thomas.

The district was created in 1925 after a new city charter was passed, which replaced the former "at large" voting system for a nine-member council with a district system with a 15-member council. The district has occupied the same general area since it was formed in 1925. With the city's changes in population, its western boundary has moved farther west and its southern boundary farther south. In 1961, San Fernando Valley residents for a time backed an unsuccessful plan to move the 10th District seat to the Valley after it was left vacant with the resignation of Council Member Charles Navarro.

== Geography ==
The district comprises all or parts of Arlington Heights, Koreatown, Mid-City, Palms, South Robertson, West Adams, and Wilshire Center.

The district is completely within California's 37th congressional district and California's 28th State Senate district, and overlaps California's 57th, 61st, and 55th State Assembly districts.

=== Historical boundaries ===
At its creation, it was bounded on Pico Boulevard, Washington Boulevard and Jefferson Boulevard, Alameda Street; and Vermont Avenue. A year later, it was moved to bound Jefferson Boulevard and Central Avenue. In 1933, it was at Pico Boulevard, Jefferson Boulevard and Exposition Boulevard, Hooper Avenue, and Vermont Avenue. In 1955, it had the "south-central section of the city, extending roughly from Wilshire Blvd. to Jefferson Blvd., and from La Brea Ave. to Main St."

By the 1960s, Baldwin Hills had been given to the 6th district and the 10th district covered "the general area known as the West Adams section."

In 1973, it included "parts of the Leimert Park, Crenshaw, Wilshire, West Adams, and Fairfax areas." In 1986, the Los Angeles Times showed the district reaching Beverly Boulevard on the northeast, Martin Luther King Jr. Boulevard on the south, Sepulveda Boulevard on the west and Wilshire Boulevard on the north. In 1993, it stretched "from Palms to Koreatown and South Los Angeles." In 2020, it stretched from Koreatown to Crenshaw Boulevard, including West Adams and Mid-City.

== List of members representing the district ==
Councilmember	Party	Dates	Electoral history
District established July 1, 1925
Charles E. Downs (South Central)	Republican	July 1, 1925 – August 21, 1925	Elected in 1925. Suspended after a bribery indictment.
Vacant		August 21, 1925 – October 23, 1925	
Otto J. Zahn (University Park)	Republican	October 23, 1925 – June 30, 1927	Appointed to finish Downs's term. Lost election.
E. Snapper Ingram (Miracle Mile)	Independent	July 1, 1927 – June 30, 1935	Elected in 1927. Re-elected in 1929. Re-elected in 1933. Re-elected in 1929. Lost re-election.
G. Vernon Bennett (West Adams)	Democratic	July 1, 1935 – June 30, 1951	Elected in 1935. Re-elected in 1937. Re-elected in 1939. Re-elected in 1941. Re-elected in 1943. Re-elected in 1945. Re-elected in 1947. e-elected in 1949. Lost re-election.
Charles Navarro (Westlake)	Republican	July 1, 1951 – June 30, 1961	Elected in 1951. Re-elected in 1953. Re-elected in 1955. Re-elected in 1959. Retired to run for City Controller.
Vacant		June 30, 1961 – August 25, 1961	
Joe E. Hollingsworth (Baldwin Hills)	Republican	August 25, 1961 – April 2, 1963	Appointed to serve until next election. Lost election.
Tom Bradley (Leimert Park)	Democratic	April 2, 1963 – June 30, 1973	Elected in 1963. Re-elected in 1967. Re-elected in 1971. Resigned to after election as Mayor of Los Angeles.
Vacant		June 30, 1973 – September 18, 1973	
David S. Cunningham Jr. (Baldwin Hills)	Democratic	September 18, 1973 – September 30, 1986	Elected to finish Bradley's term. Re-elected in 1975. Re-elected in 1979. Re-elected in 1983. Resigned.
Vacant		September 30, 1986 – July 1, 1987	
Nate Holden (Crenshaw)	Democratic	July 1, 1987 – June 30, 2003	Elected in 1987. Re-elected in 1991. Re-elected in 1995. Re-elected in 1999. Retired.
Martin Ludlow (Baldwin Vista)	Democratic	July 1, 2003 – June 30, 2005	Elected in 2003. Resigned to become head of the L. A. County Federation of Labor.
Vacant		June 30, 2005 – November 8, 2005	
Herb Wesson (Mid-City)	Democratic	November 8, 2005 – December 13, 2020	Elected to finish Ludlow's term. Elected in 2007. Re-elected in 2010. Re-elected in 2015. Term-limited and retired..
Mark Ridley-Thomas (Leimert Park)	Democratic	December 14, 2020 – March 17, 2022	Elected in 2020. Suspended after a bribery indictment.
Vacant		October 20, 2021 – March 17, 2022	Chief of staff Karly Katona appointed as caretaker until appointment of new member.
Herb Wesson (Mid-City)	Democratic	March 17, 2022 – August 25, 2022	Appointed to finish Ridley-Thomas's term. Barred from council duties and resigned.
Vacant		August 25, 2022 – September 2, 2022	Chief of staff Heather Hutt appointed as caretaker until appointment of new member.
Heather Hutt (Baldwin Vista)	Democratic	September 2, 2022 – March 30, 2023	Appointed to finish Ridley-Thomas's term. Seat declared vacant due to Ridley-Thomas's conviction.
Vacant		March 30, 2023 – April 11, 2023	Councilmember Heather Hutt re-appointed as caretaker until appointment of new member.
Heather Hutt (Baldwin Vista)	Democratic	April 11, 2023 – present	Re-appointed to finish Ridley-Thomas's term. Elected in 2024.
