= Heather Hutt =

American politician (born 1959)

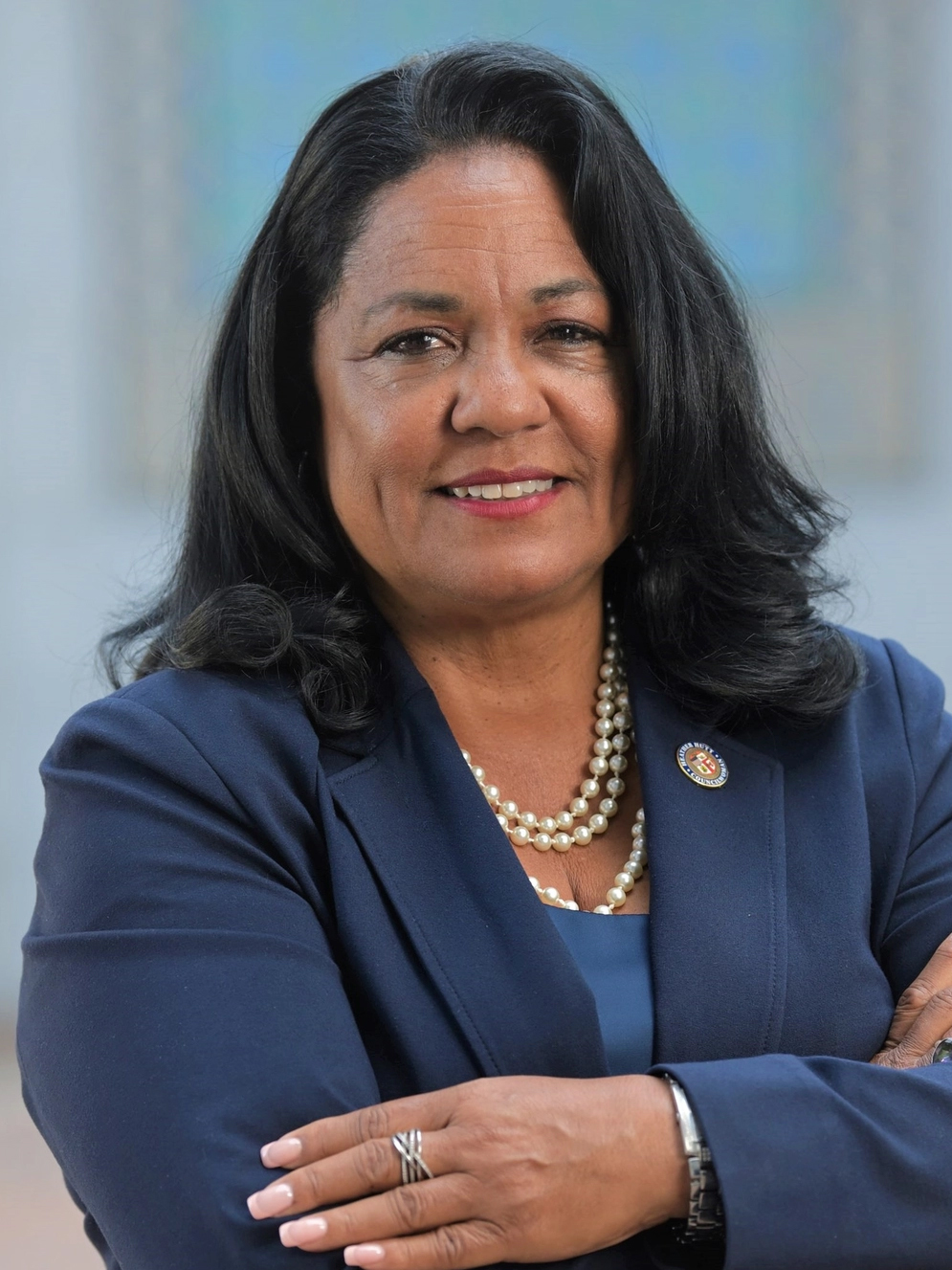
- Official portrait, 2024

Member of the Los Angeles City Council for the 10th district
- Incumbent
- Assumed office March 30, 2023; Acting: March 30, 2023 – April 11, 2023
- Preceded by: Herself
- In office August 25, 2022 – March 30, 2023; Acting: August 25, 2022 – September 2, 2022
- Preceded by: Mark Ridley-Thomas
- Succeeded by: Herself

Personal details
- Born: April 5, 1959 (age 67) Los Angeles, California, U.S.
- Party: Democratic
- Children: 3
- Education: University of Southern California (attended)

Heather J. Hutt (born April 5, 1959) is an American politician who is currently serving as an appointed councilmember representing the 10th District of Los Angeles since April 11, 2023, previously serving for a temporary vacancy from September 2, 2022, to March 30, 2023. She was previously a candidate for California's 54th State Assembly district in 2021 and served as a California State Director for then-Senator Kamala Harris from 2019 to 2020.

== Early political career ==
In 2011, Hutt was hired as a district director for Assemblymember Isadore Hall III, which she continued following Hall's election to the California State Senate. In February 2017, Hutt was named the Regional Deputy Director for then-Senator Kamala Harris. On March 28, 2019, Harris announced new hires for senior roles, to which Hutt was hired as the California State Director.

On February 1, 2022, Hutt announced that she would be running for California's 54th State Assembly district after it was vacated by Sydney Kamlager's election to the California State Senate. She was endorsed by politicians such as Janice Hahn, Yvonne Brathwaite Burke, and Maxine Waters. In the election, she was led by Isaac Bryan in the initial count, and lost the special primary to Bryan on May 18, 2021.

== Los Angeles City Council ==
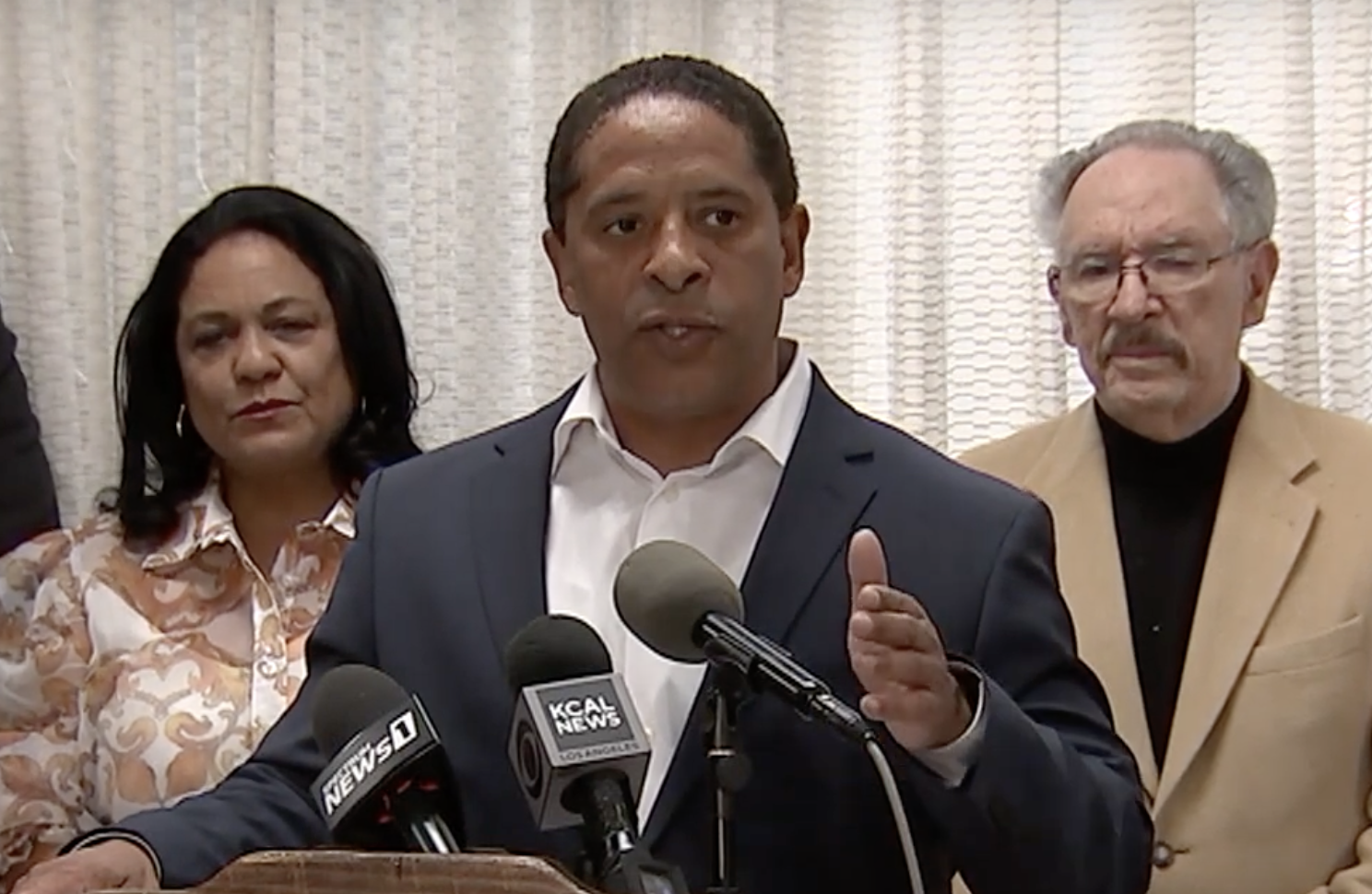
Hutt (left) with former councilmember Martin Ludlow and School Board member George J. McKenna III in 2023.

In March 2022, Hutt was appointed by councilmember Herb Wesson to be his chief of staff for District 10 after he fired the previous chief of staff and former caretaker of the district, Karly Katona. Wesson had been appointed himself to the seat after Mark Ridley-Thomas was indicted on bribery charges. Hutt's appointment was historic as she is the first African American woman to serve as chief of staff since 1973, when Maxine Waters was chief deputy to David S. Cunningham Jr. In July 2022, California Attorney General Rob Bonta granted activists against Wesson's appointment to sue, and Wesson was blocked from serving as councilmember; Council President Nury Martinez appointed Hutt as a caretaker of the district.

After a month of no representation, some residents of District 10 asked for voting privileges for Hutt to give them a voice in the City Council, while others expressed concern that residents should have the right to elect their own representative. On August 26, 2022, Martinez introduced a motion to appoint Hutt as a councilmember, which was seconded by four other members. The motion was opposed by Marqueece Harris-Dawson and Mike Bonin, who instead proposed instructing the City Attorney to find eligibility requirements for appointments. On August 30, the vote to instate Hutt as a councilmember fell one vote short, with five voting for and five voting against; it was referred to the Rules, Elections and Intergovernmental Relations Committee for further discussion. The Committee cleared her for reconsideration by the council the next day, and Hutt was confirmed by the Council in the next meeting and sworn in on September 2, 2022. On March 9, 2023, Hutt announced her election campaign for the district.

On March 30, 2023, after Ridley-Thomas was convicted of bribery, Hutt's place on the City Council was no longer in force due to her appointment only being for the temporary vacancy. Council President Paul Krekorian re-appointed Hutt as the caretaker of the district and called on the City Council to re-appoint her as a councilmember for the remainder of the unexpired term. On April 11, 2023, the City Council voted to re-appoint her as council to serve Ridley-Thomas's term.

== Electoral history ==
Electoral history of Ken Weir
Year	Office		Party	Primary			General			Result	Swing	Ref.
Year	Office		Party	Total	%	P.	Total	%	P.	Result	Swing	Ref.
2021	California State Assembly	54th	Democratic	10,538	24.92%	2nd	Runoff cancelled			Lost	Hold	
2024	Los Angeles City Council	10th	Nonpartisan	13,499	37.78%	1st	50,895	62.81%	1st	Won	N/A	
