= Baldwin Lake (Anoka County, Minnesota) =

Lake in the state of Minnesota, United States

- Location within Minnesota
- Location: Anoka County, Minnesota
- Coordinates: 45.1394104°N 93.1355006°W
- Type: Lake
- Surface elevation: 879 feet (268 m)

Baldwin Lake is a lake on the Mississippi River in Anoka County, Minnesota.

== Geology ==
Baldwin Lake popular for fishing in the area. the lake is home to Largemouth bass, Bluegill, and Northern pike.
