= Boyle Workman =

American politician and businessman (1868-1942)

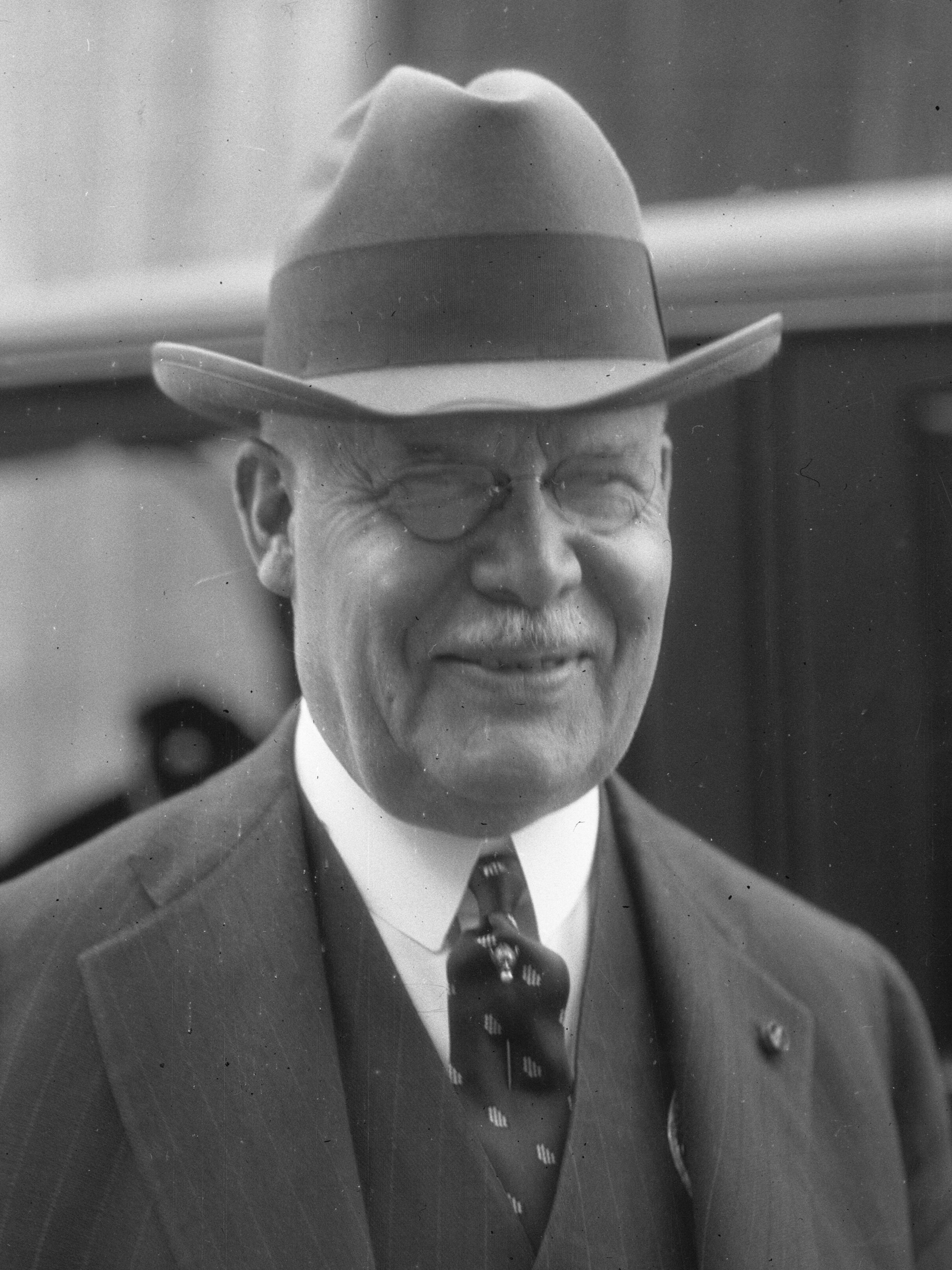
- Workman in 1929

Member of the Los Angeles City Council for the 4th district
- In office July 1, 1925 – June 30, 1927
- Preceded by: Constituency established
- Succeeded by: William M. Hughes

Member of the Los Angeles City Council for the at-large district
- In office July 7, 1919 – July 1, 1925

President of the Los Angeles City Council
- In office July 7, 1919 – July 5, 1921
- Preceded by: Bert L. Farmer
- Succeeded by: Ralph Luther Criswell
- In office July 1, 1923 – June 30, 1927
- Preceded by: Ralph Luther Criswell
- Succeeded by: William G. Bonelli

Personal details
- Born: September 20, 1868 Boyle Heights, Los Angeles, California, U.S.
- Died: December 25, 1942 (aged 74) Los Angeles, California, U.S.
- Party: Democratic
- Spouse: Frances Widney Workman
- Education: St. Vincent's College

Andrew Boyle Workman (September 20, 1868 – December 25, 1942) was a Los Angeles politician and businessman. He served as President of the Los Angeles City Council and, as such, was acting Mayor on occasion. He was the first city councilman to represent District 4 (Wilshire ward), under the new charter of 1925. He was a candidate for mayor in 1929.

== Early life ==
Boyle Workman was born in Los Angeles, California, the son of William H. Workman (1839–1918) and Maria Elizabeth Boyle (1847–1933). He attended St. Vincent's College, which then stood at Seventh Street and Broadway. From his home in Boyle Heights, he rode horseback to school. In 1884, he entered Santa Clara College for a time, but returned to St. Vincent's College and graduated in 1887.

== Los Angeles business and politics ==
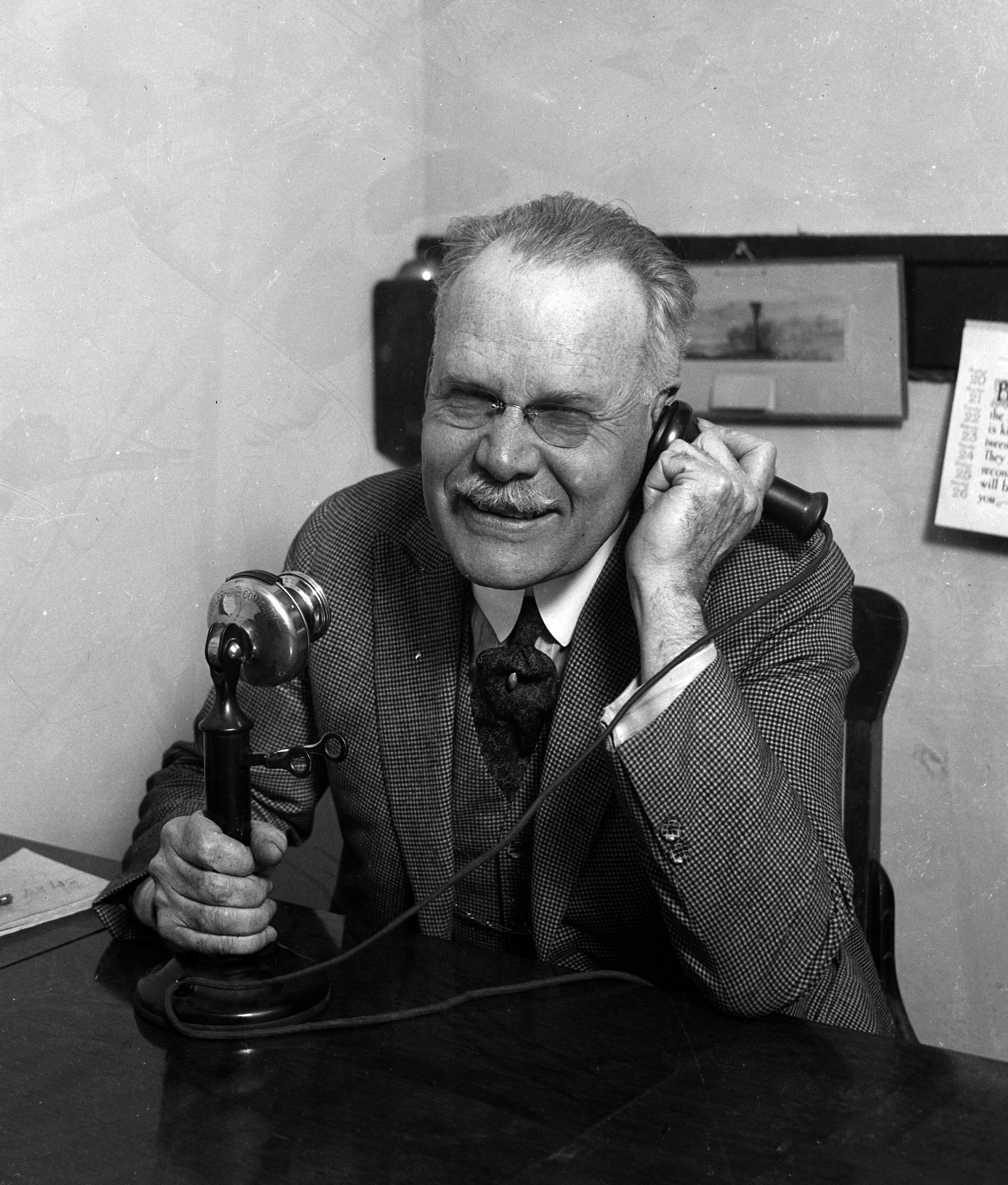
Workman using a telephone in 1927.

After leaving school, Boyle worked as a clerk for his father who was Mayor of Los Angeles from December 14, 1886, to December 10, 1888. When his father left office, Boyle worked as a clerk in the Farmers & Merchants Bank, and later was local manager for the Home Mutual Fire Insurance Company. In 1891, he worked as a draftsman in the Los Angeles City Engineer's office.

From 1900 to 1907, Workman was Assistant City Treasurer. He was a member of the Public Service Commission from 1913 until 1917. Two years later, on July 7, 1919, he was elected to the City Council and was chosen president of that body. In 1925, he became the councilman elected to represent the newly formed District 4, which included Pico Heights and the Wilshire ward, where he lived.

Workman served as City Council President, and Councilman of District 4, until 1927. He was also a member of the Finance Committee of the City Council. In 1929, he made a run for the Mayoral seat, losing in a close election. He was also actively involved in business, including ownership of the Monarch Brick Company, the fire insurance firm of Garland and Workman, and the vice-presidency of the American Savings Bank.

== Family life ==
Workman and Martha Frances Widney (June 17, 1874 – July 3, 1971) were married on November 17, 1895, in Los Angeles. Frances was the daughter of Judge Robert M. Widney (1838–1929) and Mary Barnes (1844–1924). The Workmans had two daughters, Eleanor Workman (March 24, 1897 – February 29, 1972) and Audree Workman (February 3, 1904 – August 1, 1932).

After he retired from official public life, Workman devoted much of his time to collecting data on the history of Los Angeles, a work that culminated in his book Boyle Workman's The City That Grew, a semi-autobiographical narrative that was published in 1936.

Boyle Workman died at age 74 of a brain hemorrhage in Los Angeles. He is interred in Evergreen Cemetery.

== See also ==
- Boyle-Workman family
- Los Angeles City Council presidents

Preceded by Constituency established	Los Angeles City Council; 4th district 1925–1927	Succeeded by William M. Hughes
Preceded by Bert L. Farmer	President of the Los Angeles City Council; 1919–1921; 1923–1927	Succeeded by Ralph Luther Criswell
Preceded by Ralph Luther Criswell	President of the Los Angeles City Council; 1919–1921; 1923–1927	Succeeded by William G. Bonelli
