= E. Snapper Ingram =

American politician

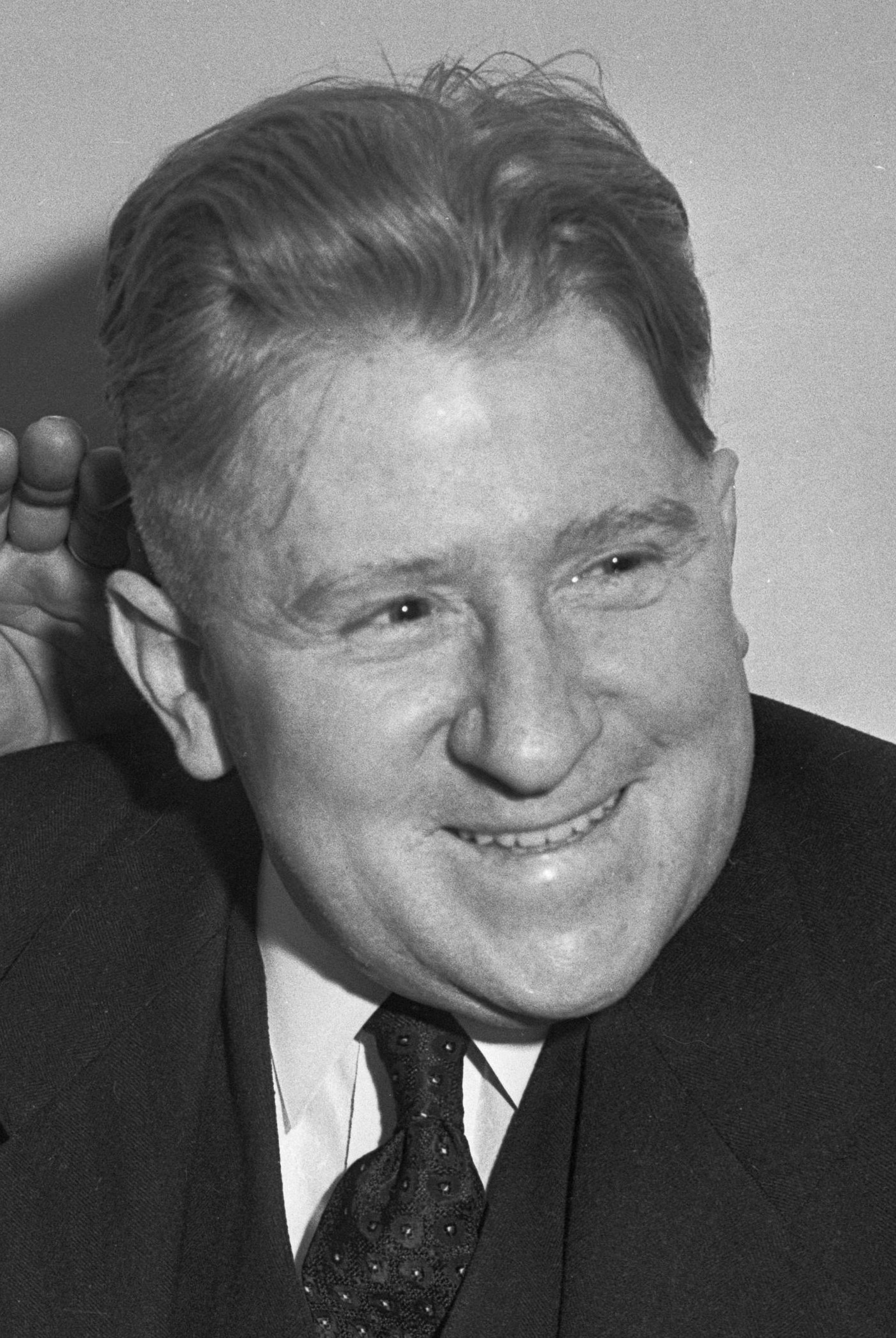
- Ingram in the 1930s

Member of the Los Angeles City Council for the 10th district
- In office July 1, 1927 – June 30, 1935
- Preceded by: Otto J. Zahn
- Succeeded by: G. Vernon Bennett

Personal details
- Born: December 8, 1884 Johnstown, Pennsylvania
- Died: April 19, 1966 (aged 81) Los Angeles, California

Ebenezer Snapper Ingram (December 8, 1884 – April 19, 1966) was a Los Angeles City Council member representing the 10th District from 1927 until 1935.

== Biography ==
Ingram was born on December 8, 1884, to Samuel S. Ingram and Elizabeth E. James in Johnstown, Pennsylvania, and came to Los Angeles in 1910. He had a brother, Russell Uhl Ingram. Ingram began his working career in 1910 in the office of the Los Angeles city engineer. He served in World War I as a member of Battery B, Second Anti-Aircraft Battalion, attached to the First Army Artillery Headquarters.

On reentering civilian life he became active in the local chapter of 40 & 8, La Société des Quarante Hommes et Huit Chevaux, which in 1929 was described as "the fun-making organization of the American Legion." In October of that year at the convention in Louisville, Kentucky, he was elected Chef de Chemin de Fer, the president of the national organization. He was also a Mason and an American Legion member.

Ingram was a member of so many social organizations — 28 altogether — that he had a special pocketbook made to carry all his membership cards, a feature story in the Los Angeles Times reported in 1928.

Ingram took the name Snapper as his own when he became a member of the Shriners. He explained in 1927:

I was interested in athletics and became a member of the Shrine patrol drill team. Being the shortest man in the contingent, I was given the end position and among our maneuvers was a "crack-the whip" movement. Being on the end of the rank, I was on the "snapper" end of the whip and because of the many tumbles I incurred from the "cracking of the whip" I was called "Snapper."

He died on April 19, 1966, after a fall in his home at 407 South Fuller Avenue. He was survived by his wife, Anita, whom he had married in 1930.

== Public life ==
=== Elections ===
He successfully ran for election to the City Council for a two-year term in 1927 against the incumbent, Otto J. Zahn. He said his campaign plans were delayed for a week because he wanted to use the name "Snapper" on the ballots, but the City Clerk hesitated to do so. The City Attorney, however, ruled that a candidate could use the name by which he was best known.

Ingram was re-elected in the primary voting in 1929. In the next election, 1931, he bested George Underwood by a vote of 5,807 to 4,891.

At that time the 10th District was bounded by West Pico and Ninth Street on the north, Jefferson Boulevard on the south, Vermont Avenue on the west and Hooper Avenue or Central Avenue on the east.

In 1945, Ingram, "whose desire to be helpful has made him many friends," was a City Council candidate in the Fourth District, coming in fourth in a field of eight candidates and losing to Harold A. Henry.

=== Activities ===
Recall threatened. In January 1930, Ingram and seven other council members who had voted in favor of granting a rock-crushing permit in the Santa Monica Mountains were unsuccessfully targeted for recall on the grounds that the eight

have conspired with . . . Alphonzo Bell, Samuel Traylor and Chapin A. Day, all multi-millionaires, to grant this group a special spot zoning permit to crush and ship . . . from the high-class residential section of Santa Monica, limestone and rock for cement.

Racial restrictions. Ingram was one of the eight council members who in July 1931 voted against appealing a judge's decision ordering an end to racial restrictions in city-operated swimming pools, thus ending the practice. Six council members wanted to continue the legal fight. The pools had previously been restricted by race to certain days or hours.

Preceded by Otto J. Zahn	Los Angeles City Council; 10th District; 1927–35	Succeeded by G. Vernon Bennett
