= 2014 United States House of Representatives elections in California =

- November 4, 2014

All 53 California seats to the United States House of Representatives
	Majority party	Minority party
Party	Democratic	Republican
Last election	38	15
Seats won	39	14
Seat change	▲1	▼1
Popular vote	4,201,975	2,816,312
Percentage	58.91%	39.49%
Swing	▼1.66%	▲2.37%

Democratic hold Democratic gain
Republican hold
Democratic
50–60%
60–70%
70–80%
80–90%
90–100%
Republican
50–60%
60–70%
70–80%
90–100%

The 2014 United States House of Representatives elections in California were held on Tuesday, November 4, 2014, with a primary election on June 3, 2014. Voters elected the 53 U.S. representatives from the state of California, one from each of the state's 53 congressional districts. The elections coincided with the elections of other offices, including a gubernatorial election.

Almost all seats in California retained their partisan control from the 2012 house elections. The sole exception was California's 31st congressional district, which flipped to the Democratic party. In that race, Pete Aguilar received 51.7% of the vote and defeated Paul Chabot.

== Overview ==
2014 United States House of Representatives elections in California Primary election — June 3, 2014
Party	Votes	Percentage	Candidates	Advancing to general	Seats contesting
Democratic	2,277,962	54.87%	100	56	51
Republican	1,731,361	41.71%	90	46	44
No party preference	116,429	2.80%	23	3	3
Green	9,243	0.22%	4	0	0
Libertarian	8,391	0.20%	5	0	0
Peace and Freedom	7,889	0.19%	4	1	1
American Independent	152	0.00%	2	0	0
Valid votes	4,151,424	93.05%	—	—	—
Invalid votes	309,922	6.95%	—	—	—
Totals	4,461,346	100.00%	227	106	—
Voter turnout	25.17%				

2014 United States House of Representatives elections in California General election — November 4, 2014
Party	Votes	Percentage	Seats	+/–
Democratic	4,201,975	58.91%	39	▲1
Republican	2,816,312	39.49%	14	▼1
No party preference	104,813	1.47%	0	Steady
Peace and Freedom	9,192	0.13%	0	Steady
Valid votes	7,132,292	94.92%	—	—
Invalid votes	381,680	5.08%	—	—
Totals	7,513,972	100.00%	53	—
Voter turnout	42.20%			

=== By district ===
Results of the 2014 United States House of Representatives elections in California by district:

District	Democratic		Republican		Others		Total		Result
District	Votes	%	Votes	%	Votes	%	Votes	%	Result
District 1	84,320	38.97%	132,052	61.03%	0	0.00%	216,372	100.0%	Republican hold
District 2	163,124	74.99%	54,400	25.01%	0	0.00%	217,524	100.0%	Democratic hold
District 3	79,224	52.72%	71,036	47.28%	0	0.00%	150,260	100.0%	Democratic hold
District 4	0	0.00%	211,134	100.00%	0	0.00%	211,134	100.0%	Republican hold
District 5	129,613	75.73%	0	0.00%	41,535	24.27%	171,148	100.0%	Democratic hold
District 6	97,008	72.69%	36,448	27.31%	0	0.00%	133,456	100.0%	Democratic hold
District 7	92,521	50.40%	91,066	49.60%	0	0.00%	183,587	100.0%	Democratic hold
District 8	37,056	32.35%	77,480	67.65%	0	0.00%	114,536	100.0%	Republican hold
District 9	63,475	52.37%	57,729	47.63%	0	0.00%	121,204	100.0%	Democratic hold
District 10	55,123	43.85%	70,582	56.15%	0	0.00%	125,705	100.0%	Republican hold
District 11	117,502	67.27%	57,160	32.73%	0	0.00%	174,662	100.0%	Democratic hold
District 12	160,067	83.25%	32,197	16.75%	0	0.00%	192,264	100.0%	Democratic hold
District 13	168,491	88.48%	21,940	11.52%	0	0.00%	190,431	100.0%	Democratic hold
District 14	114,389	76.70%	34,757	23.30%	0	0.00%	149,146	100.0%	Democratic hold
District 15	99,756	69.81%	43,150	30.19%	0	0.00%	142,906	100.0%	Democratic hold
District 16	46,277	50.73%	44,943	49.27%	0	0.00%	91,220	100.0%	Democratic hold
District 17	134,408	100.00%	0	0.00%	0	0.00%	134,408	100.0%	Democratic hold
District 18	133,060	67.75%	63,326	32.25%	0	0.00%	196,386	100.0%	Democratic hold
District 19	127,788	100.00%	0	0.00%	0	0.00%	127,788	100.0%	Democratic hold
District 20	106,034	75.18%	0	0.00%	35,010	24.82%	141,044	100.0%	Democratic hold
District 21	33,470	42.17%	45,907	57.83%	0	0.00%	79,377	100.0%	Republican hold
District 22	37,289	27.96%	96,053	72.04%	0	0.00%	133,342	100.0%	Republican hold
District 23	33,726	25.16%	100,317	74.84%	0	0.00%	134,043	100.0%	Republican hold
District 24	103,228	51.93%	95,566	48.07%	0	0.00%	198,794	100.0%	Democratic hold
District 25	0	0.00%	114,072	100.00%	0	0.00%	114,072	100.0%	Republican hold
District 26	87,176	51.33%	82,653	48.67%	0	0.00%	169,829	100.0%	Democratic hold
District 27	75,728	59.36%	51,852	40.64%	0	0.00%	127,580	100.0%	Democratic hold
District 28	91,996	76.50%	0	0.00%	28,268	23.50%	120,264	100.0%	Democratic hold
District 29	50,096	74.61%	17,045	25.39%	0	0.00%	67,141	100.0%	Democratic hold
District 30	86,568	65.64%	45,315	34.36%	0	0.00%	131,883	100.0%	Democratic hold
District 31	51,622	51.73%	48,162	48.27%	0	0.00%	99,784	100.0%	Democratic gain
District 32	50,353	59.66%	34,053	40.34%	0	0.00%	84,406	100.0%	Democratic hold
District 33	108,331	59.19%	74,700	40.81%	0	0.00%	183,031	100.0%	Democratic hold
District 34	61,621	100.00%	0	0.00%	0	0.00%	61,621	100.0%	Democratic hold
District 35	62,255	100.00%	0	0.00%	0	0.00%	62,255	100.0%	Democratic hold
District 36	72,682	54.18%	61,457	45.82%	0	0.00%	134,139	100.0%	Democratic hold
District 37	96,787	84.28%	18,051	15.72%	0	0.00%	114,838	100.0%	Democratic hold
District 38	58,192	59.09%	40,288	40.91%	0	0.00%	98,480	100.0%	Democratic hold
District 39	41,906	31.46%	91,319	68.54%	0	0.00%	133,225	100.0%	Republican hold
District 40	49,379	100.00%	0	0.00%	0	0.00%	49,379	100.0%	Democratic hold
District 41	46,948	56.64%	35,936	43.36%	0	0.00%	82,884	100.0%	Democratic hold
District 42	38,850	34.26%	74,540	65.74%	0	0.00%	113,390	100.0%	Republican hold
District 43	69,681	70.96%	28,521	29.04%	0	0.00%	98,202	100.0%	Democratic hold
District 44	59,670	86.65%	0	0.00%	9,192	13.35%	68,862	100.0%	Democratic hold
District 45	56,819	34.88%	106,083	65.12%	0	0.00%	162,902	100.0%	Republican hold
District 46	49,738	59.70%	33,577	40.30%	0	0.00%	83,315	100.0%	Democratic hold
District 47	69,091	55.99%	54,309	44.01%	0	0.00%	123,400	100.0%	Democratic hold
District 48	62,713	35.88%	112,082	64.12%	0	0.00%	174,795	100.0%	Republican hold
District 49	64,981	39.83%	98,161	60.17%	0	0.00%	163,142	100.0%	Republican hold
District 50	45,302	28.80%	111,997	71.20%	0	0.00%	157,299	100.0%	Republican hold
District 51	56,373	68.79%	25,577	31.21%	0	0.00%	81,950	100.0%	Democratic hold
District 52	98,826	51.59%	92,746	48.41%	0	0.00%	191,572	100.0%	Democratic hold
District 53	87,104	58.84%	60,940	41.16%	0	0.00%	148,044	100.0%	Democratic hold
Total	4,067,737	57.03%	2,950,679	41.37%	114,005	1.60%	7,132,421	100.0%	

=== Map key ===
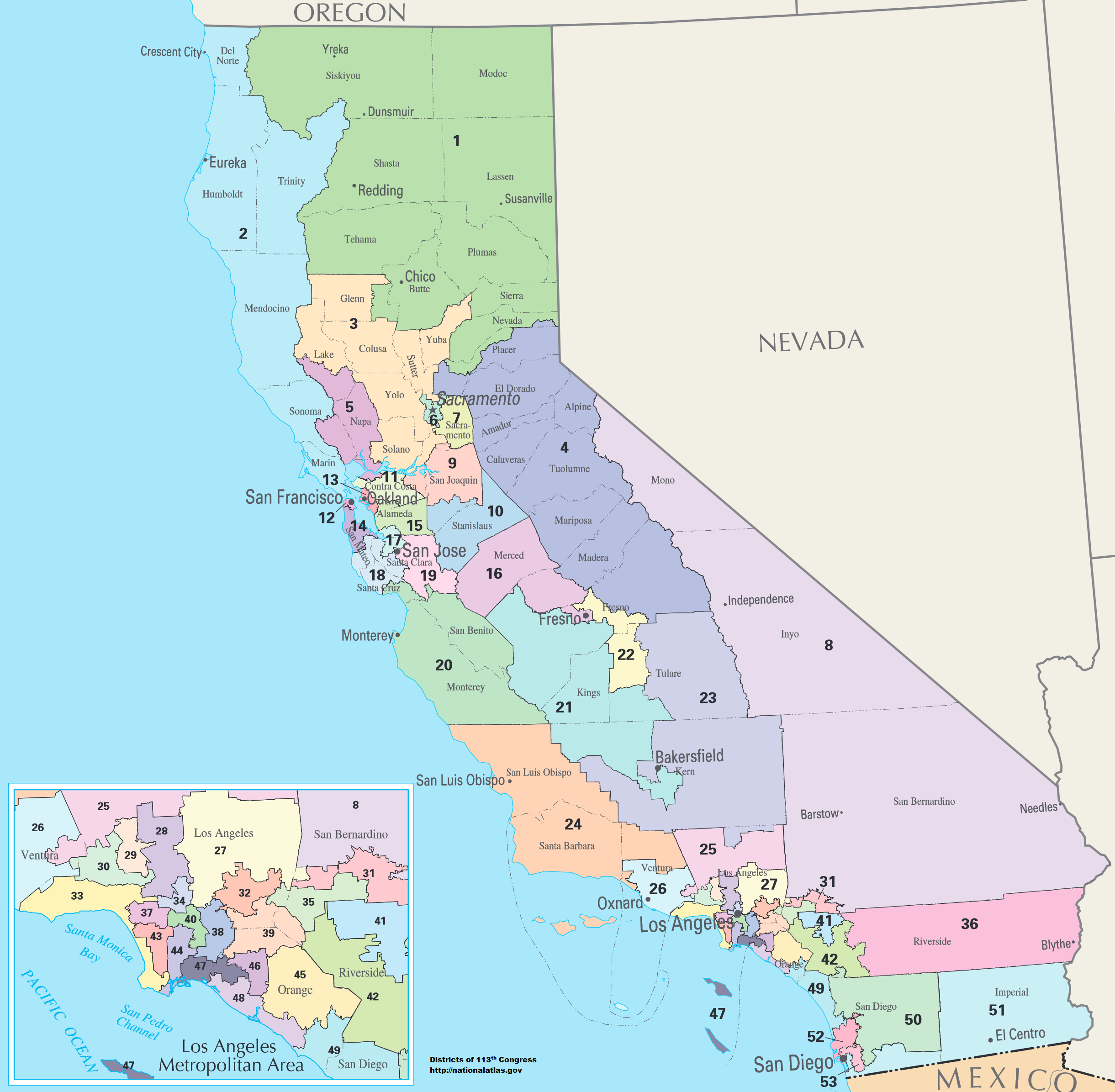

This map displays the location of California's congressional districts during this election cycle, allowing the reader to cross-reference the location of each district.

== District 1 ==
2014 California's 1st congressional district election
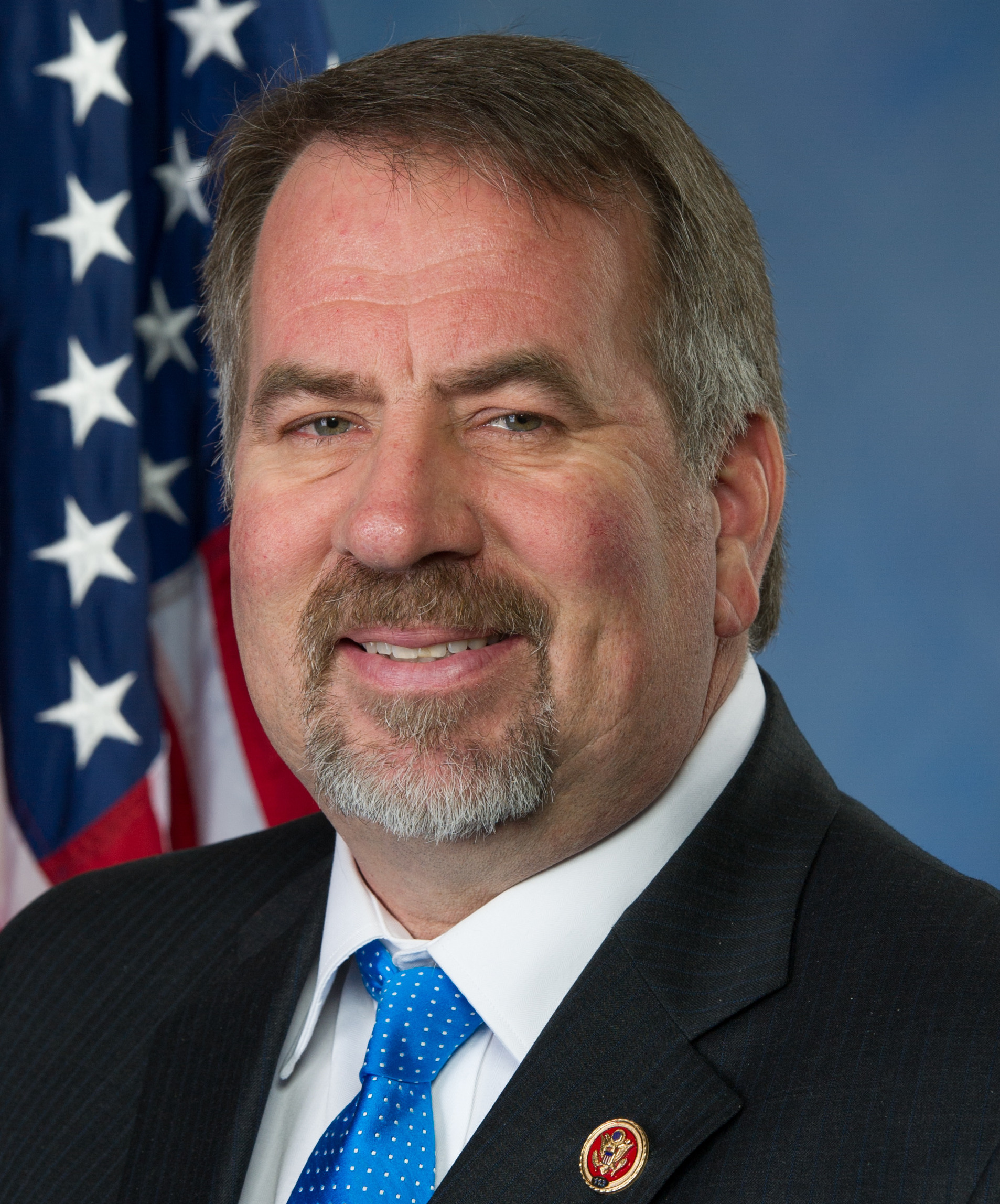

Nominee	Doug LaMalfa	Heidi Hall
Party	Republican	Democratic
Popular vote	132,052	84,320
Percentage	61.0%	39.0%
- County results Malfa: 50–60% 60–70% 70–80% 80–90%
U.S. Representative before election
Doug LaMalfa
Republican
Elected U.S. Representative
Doug LaMalfa
Republican

The 1st district is based in inland Northern California and includes Chico and Redding. Incumbent Republican Doug LaMalfa, who had represented the 1st district since 2013, ran for re-election.

=== Primary election ===
==== Republican candidates ====
===== Advanced to general =====
- Doug LaMalfa, incumbent U.S. representative

===== Eliminated in primary =====
- Gregory Cheadle, real estate broker and candidate for this seat in 2012

===== Withdrawn =====
- Dolores Lucero, former Shasta Lake Council member

==== Democratic candidates ====
===== Advanced to general =====
- Heidi Hall, program manager for the state Department of Water Resources

===== Eliminated in primary =====
- Dan Levine, medical cannabis farmer

==== Results ====
Nonpartisan blanket primary results
Party	Candidate	Votes	%
Republican	Doug LaMalfa (incumbent)	75,317	53.4
Democratic	Heidi Hall	42,481	30.1
Republican	Gregory Cheadle	13,909	9.8
Democratic	Dan Levine	9,213	6.5
Total votes		140,920	100.0

=== General election ===
==== Predictions ====
Source	Ranking	As of
The Cook Political Report	Safe R	November 3, 2014
Rothenberg	Safe R	October 24, 2014
Sabato's Crystal Ball	Safe R	October 30, 2014
RCP	Safe R	November 2, 2014
Daily Kos Elections	Safe R	November 4, 2014

==== Results ====
California's 1st congressional district election, 2014
Party	Candidate	Votes	%
Republican	Doug LaMalfa (incumbent)	132,052	61.0
Democratic	Heidi Hall	84,320	39.0
Total votes		216,372	100.0
Republican hold			

== District 2 ==
2014 California's 2nd congressional district election
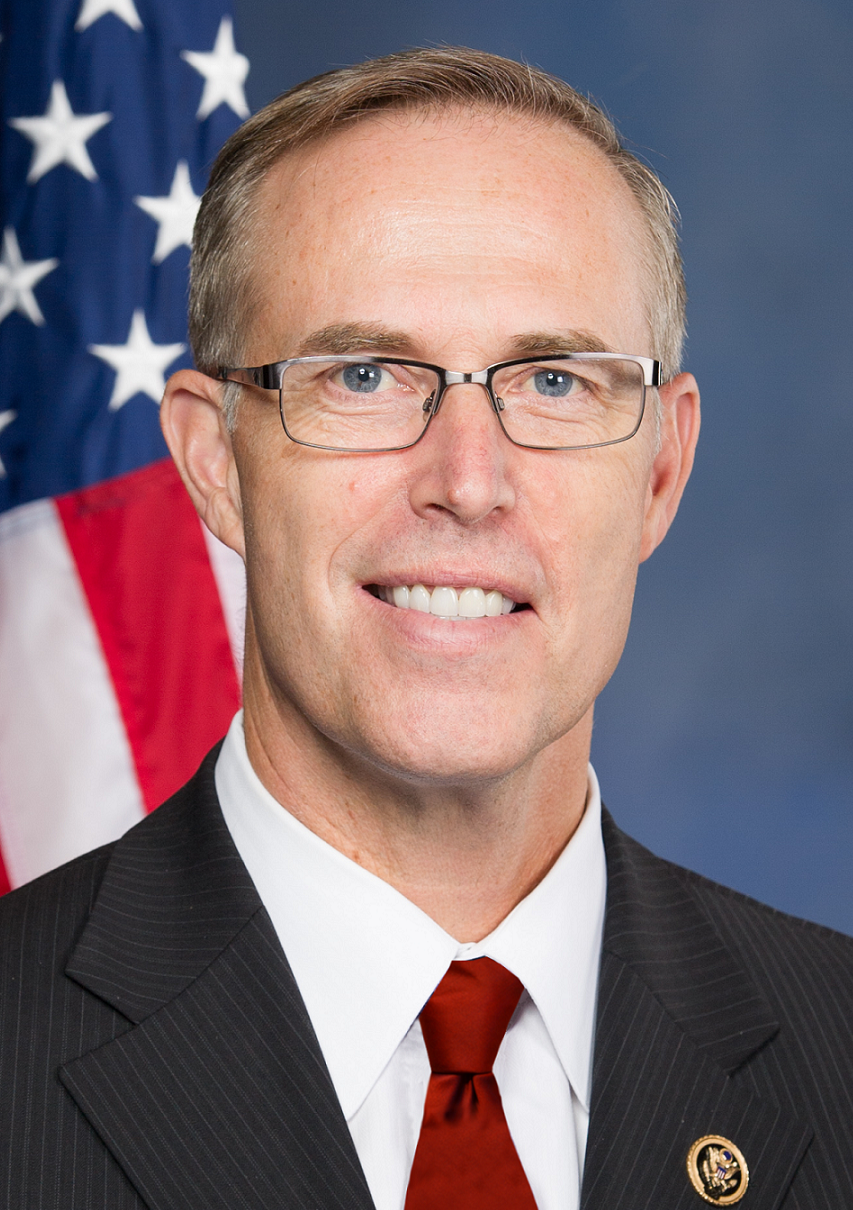

Nominee	Jared Huffman	Dale K. Mensing
Party	Democratic	Republican
Popular vote	163,124	54,400
Percentage	75.0%	25.0%
- County results Huffman: 50–60% 60–70% 70–80% 80–90%
U.S. Representative before election
Jared Huffman
Democratic
Elected U.S. Representative
Jared Huffman
Democratic

The 2nd district is based in California's North Coast and includes Eureka, San Rafael, Petaluma, and Ukiah. Incumbent Democrat Jared Huffman, who had represented the 2nd district since 2013, ran for re-election.

=== Primary election ===
==== Democratic candidates ====
===== Advanced to general =====
- Jared Huffman, incumbent U.S. representative

===== Eliminated in primary =====
- Andy Caffrey, sustainability conversion planner

==== Republican candidates ====
===== Advanced to general =====
- Dale Mensing, supermarket cashier

==== Results ====
Nonpartisan blanket primary results
Party	Candidate	Votes	%
Democratic	Jared Huffman (incumbent)	99,186	67.9
Republican	Dale K. Mensing	32,614	22.3
Democratic	Andy Caffrey	14,245	9.8
Total votes		146,045	100.0

=== General election ===
==== Predictions ====
Source	Ranking	As of
The Cook Political Report	Safe D	November 3, 2014
Rothenberg	Safe D	October 24, 2014
Sabato's Crystal Ball	Safe D	October 30, 2014
RCP	Safe D	November 2, 2014
Daily Kos Elections	Safe D	November 4, 2014

==== Results ====
California's 2nd congressional district election, 2014
Party	Candidate	Votes	%
Democratic	Jared Huffman (incumbent)	163,124	75.0
Republican	Dale K. Mensing	54,400	25.0
Total votes		217,524	100.0
Democratic hold			

== District 3 ==
2014 California's 3rd congressional district election
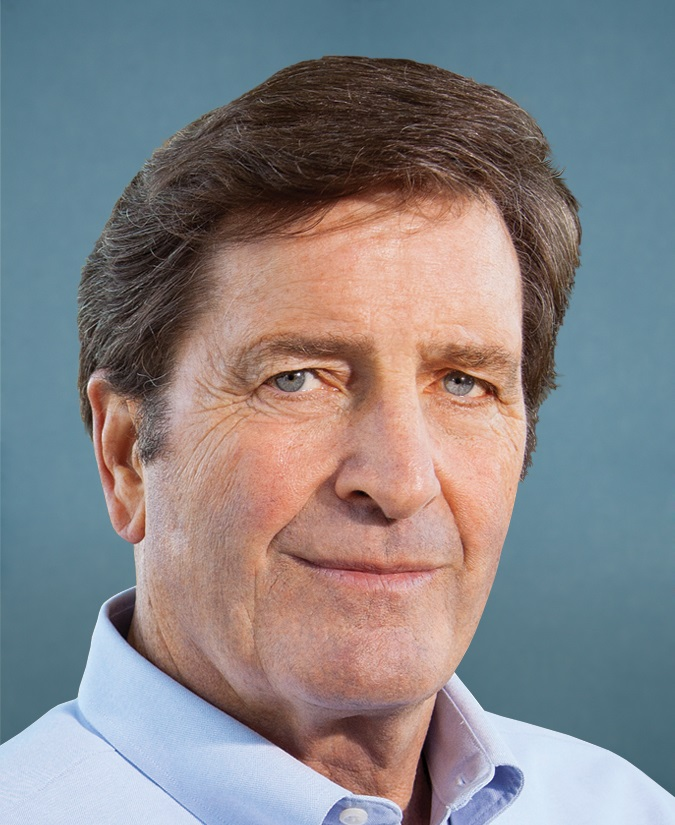

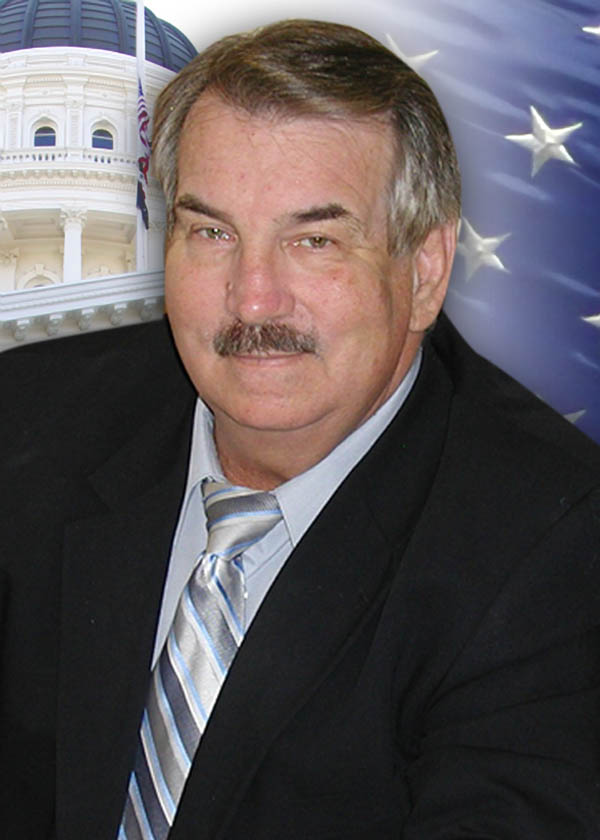
Nominee	John Garamendi	Dan Logue
Party	Democratic	Republican
Popular vote	79,224	71,036
Percentage	52.7%	47.3%
- County results Logue: 50–60% 60–70% Garamendi: 50–60% 60–70%
U.S. Representative before election
John Garamendi
Democratic
Elected U.S. Representative
John Garamendi
Democratic

The 3rd district is based in north central California and includes Davis, Fairfield, and Yuba City. Incumbent Democrat John Garamendi, who had represented the 3rd district since 2013 and previously represented the 10th district from 2009 to 2013, ran for re-election.

=== Primary election ===
==== Democratic candidates ====
===== Advanced to general =====
- John Garamendi, incumbent U.S. representative

==== Republican candidates ====
===== Advanced to general =====
- Dan Logue, state assembly member

===== Declined =====
- Kim Vann, Colusa County Board of Supervisors member and general election candidate in 2012

==== Results ====
Nonpartisan blanket primary results
Party	Candidate	Votes	%
Democratic	John Garamendi (incumbent)	54,672	53.5
Republican	Dan Logue	47,560	46.5
Total votes		102,232	100.0

=== General election ===
==== Endorsements ====
John Garamendi (D)

Organizations

- Blue Dog Coalition
Dan Logue (R)

Organizations

- BIPAC
- National Republican Congressional Committee "Young Guns" Program

==== Polling ====
Poll source	Date(s) administered	Sample size	Margin of error	John Garamendi (D)	Dan Logue (R)	Undecided
New York Times/CBS News Battleground Tracker	October 16–23, 2014	292	± 9.0%	51%	39%	9%
Moore Information (R-Logue)	September 23–24, 2014	400	± 5.0%	45%	39%	16%

==== Predictions ====
Source	Ranking	As of
The Cook Political Report	Likely D	November 3, 2014
Rothenberg	Safe D	October 24, 2014
Sabato's Crystal Ball	Safe D	October 30, 2014
RCP	Likely D	November 2, 2014
Daily Kos Elections	Likely D	November 4, 2014

==== Results ====
California's 3rd congressional district election, 2014
Party	Candidate	Votes	%
Democratic	John Garamendi (incumbent)	79,224	52.7
Republican	Dan Logue	71,036	47.3
Total votes		150,260	100.0
Democratic hold			

== District 4 ==
2014 California's 4th congressional district election
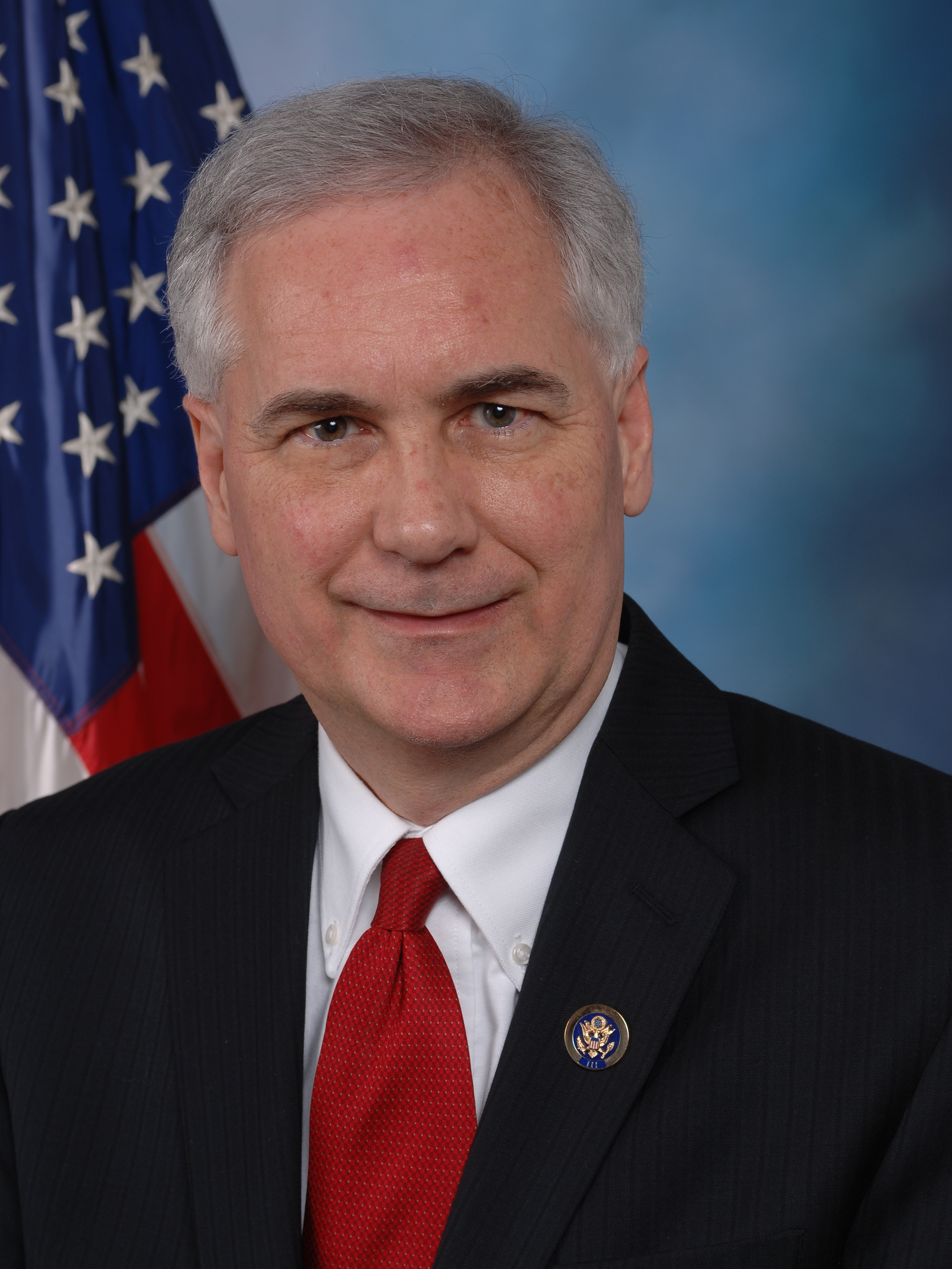

Nominee	Tom McClintock	Art Moore
Party	Republican	Republican
Popular vote	126,784	84,350
Percentage	60.0%	40.0%
U.S. Representative before election
Tom McClintock
Republican
Elected U.S. Representative
Tom McClintock
Republican

The 4th district is based in east central California and includes Lake Tahoe, Roseville, and Yosemite National Park. Incumbent Republican Tom McClintock, who had represented the 4th district since 2009, ran for re-election.

=== Primary election ===
==== Republican candidates ====
===== Advanced to general =====
- Tom McClintock, incumbent U.S. representative
- Art Moore, business executive and management consultant

==== Democratic candidates ====
===== Withdrawn =====
- Kris Johnson

==== Independent candidates ====
===== Eliminated in primary =====
- Jeffrey Gerlach, information technology analyst

==== Results ====
Nonpartisan blanket primary results
Party	Candidate	Votes	%
Republican	Tom McClintock (incumbent)	80,999	56.2
Republican	Art Moore	32,855	22.8
No party preference	Jeffrey D. Gerlach	30,300	21.0
Total votes		144,154	100.0

=== General election ===
==== Campaign ====
The first debate in the race took place on October 13, 2014.

==== Predictions ====
Source	Ranking	As of
The Cook Political Report	Safe R	November 3, 2014
Rothenberg	Safe R	October 24, 2014
Sabato's Crystal Ball	Safe R	October 30, 2014
RCP	Safe R	November 2, 2014
Daily Kos Elections	Safe R	November 4, 2014

==== Endorsements ====
Tom McClintock (R)

Organizations

- Eagle Forum
- Republican Liberty Caucus
- Tea Party Express

==== Results ====
California's 4th congressional district election, 2014
Party	Candidate	Votes	%
Republican	Tom McClintock (incumbent)	126,784	60.0
Republican	Art Moore	84,350	40.0
Total votes		211,134	100.0
Republican hold			

== District 5 ==
2014 California's 5th congressional district election
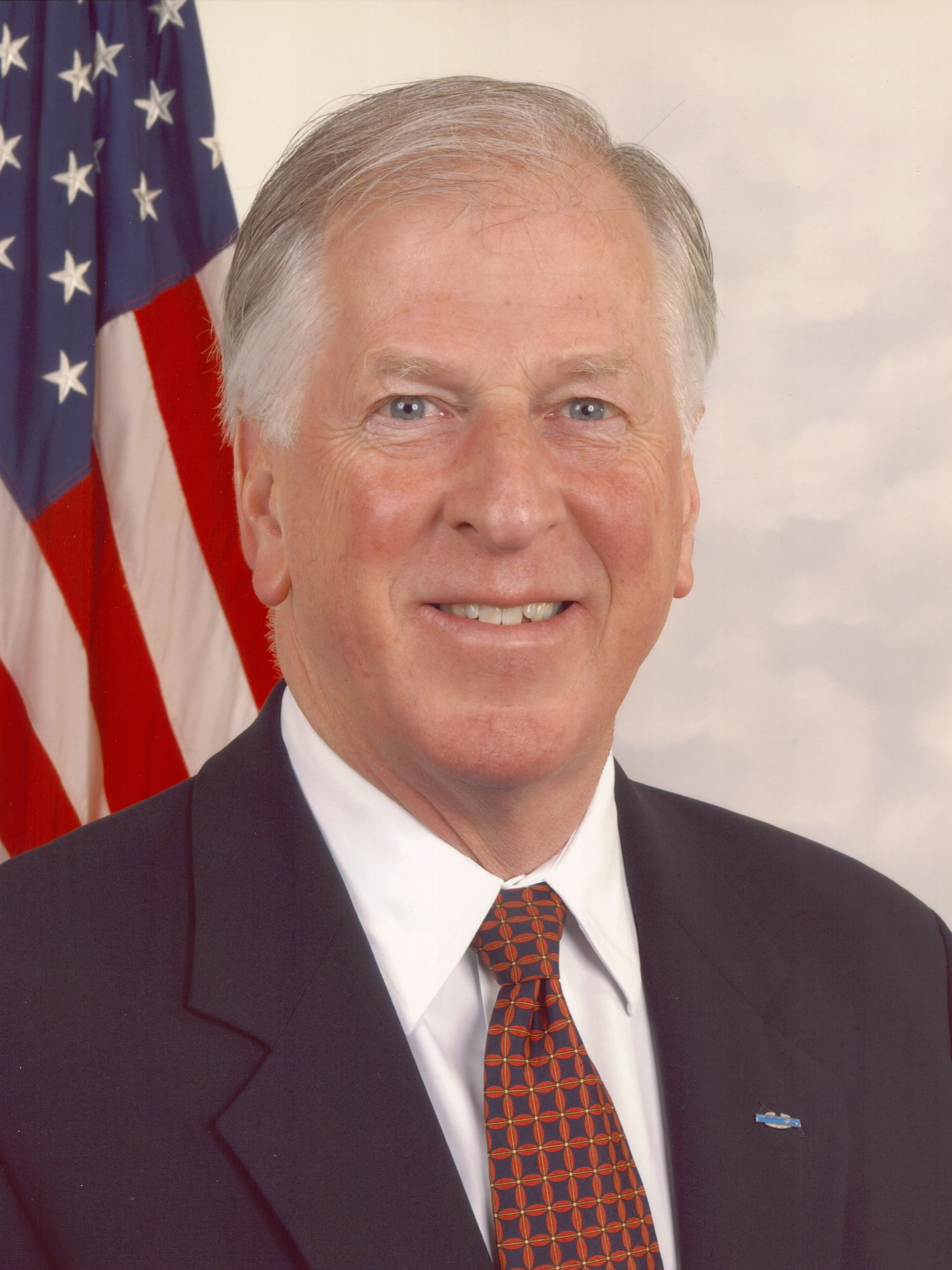

Nominee	Mike Thompson	James Hinton
Party	Democratic	No party preference
Popular vote	129,613	41,535
Percentage	75.7%	24.3%
- County results Thompson: 60–70% 70–80%
U.S. Representative before election
Mike Thompson
Democratic
Elected U.S. Representative
Mike Thompson
Democratic

The 5th district is based in the North Bay and includes Napa, Santa Rosa, and Vallejo. Incumbent Democrat Mike Thompson, who had represented the 5th district since 2013 and previously represented the 1st district from 1999 to 2013, ran for re-election.

=== Primary election ===
==== Democratic candidates ====
===== Advanced to general =====
- Mike Thompson, incumbent U.S. representative

==== Republican candidates ====
===== Withdrawn =====
- Stewart Cilley, accountant and candidate for this seat in 2012

==== Independent candidates ====
===== Advanced to general =====
- James Hinton, former online poker player

===== Eliminated in primary =====
- Douglas Van Raam, landscaper

==== Results ====
Nonpartisan blanket primary results
Party	Candidate	Votes	%
Democratic	Mike Thompson (incumbent)	88,709	80.4
No party preference	James Hinton	12,292	11.1
No party preference	Douglas S. Van Raam	9,279	8.4
Total votes		110,280	100.0

=== General election ===
==== Predictions ====
Source	Ranking	As of
The Cook Political Report	Safe D	November 3, 2014
Rothenberg	Safe D	October 24, 2014
Sabato's Crystal Ball	Safe D	October 30, 2014
RCP	Safe D	November 2, 2014
Daily Kos Elections	Safe D	November 4, 2014

==== Results ====
California's 5th congressional district election, 2014
Party	Candidate	Votes	%
Democratic	Mike Thompson (incumbent)	129,613	75.7
No party preference	James Hinton	41,535	24.3
Total votes		171,148	100.0
Democratic hold			

== District 6 ==
2014 California's 6th congressional district election
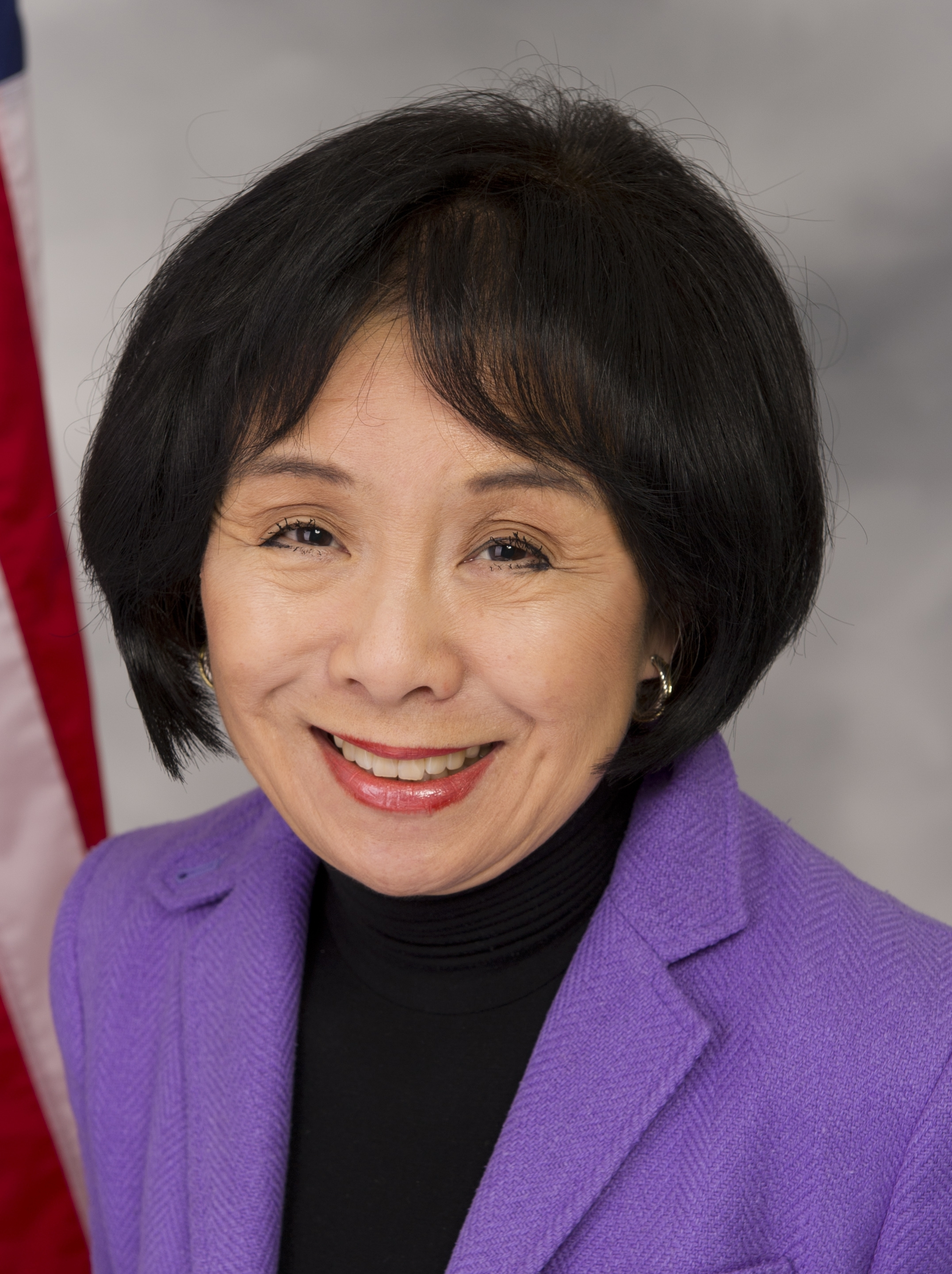

Nominee	Doris Matsui	Joseph McCray Sr.
Party	Democratic	Republican
Popular vote	97,008	36,448
Percentage	72.7%	27.3%
- County results Matsui: 60–70% 70–80%
U.S. Representative before election
Doris Matsui
Democratic
Elected U.S. Representative
Doris Matsui
Democratic

The 6th district is based in north central California and includes Sacramento. Incumbent Democrat Doris Matsui, who had represented the 6th district since 2013 and previously represented the 5th district from 2005 to 2013, ran for re-election.

=== Primary election ===
==== Democratic candidates ====
===== Advanced to general =====
- Doris Matsui, incumbent U.S. representative

==== Republican candidates ====
===== Advanced to general =====
- Joseph McCray Sr., retired military officer

==== Results ====
Nonpartisan blanket primary results
Party	Candidate	Votes	%
Democratic	Doris Matsui (incumbent)	62,640	73.6
Republican	Joseph McCray Sr.	22,465	26.4
Total votes		85,105	100.0

=== General election ===
==== Predictions ====
Source	Ranking	As of
The Cook Political Report	Safe D	November 3, 2014
Rothenberg	Safe D	October 24, 2014
Sabato's Crystal Ball	Safe D	October 30, 2014
RCP	Safe D	November 2, 2014
Daily Kos Elections	Safe D	November 4, 2014

==== Results ====
California's 6th congressional district election, 2014
Party	Candidate	Votes	%
Democratic	Doris Matsui (incumbent)	97,008	72.7
Republican	Joseph McCray Sr.	36,448	27.3
Total votes		133,456	100.0
Democratic hold			

== District 7 ==
2014 California's 7th congressional district election
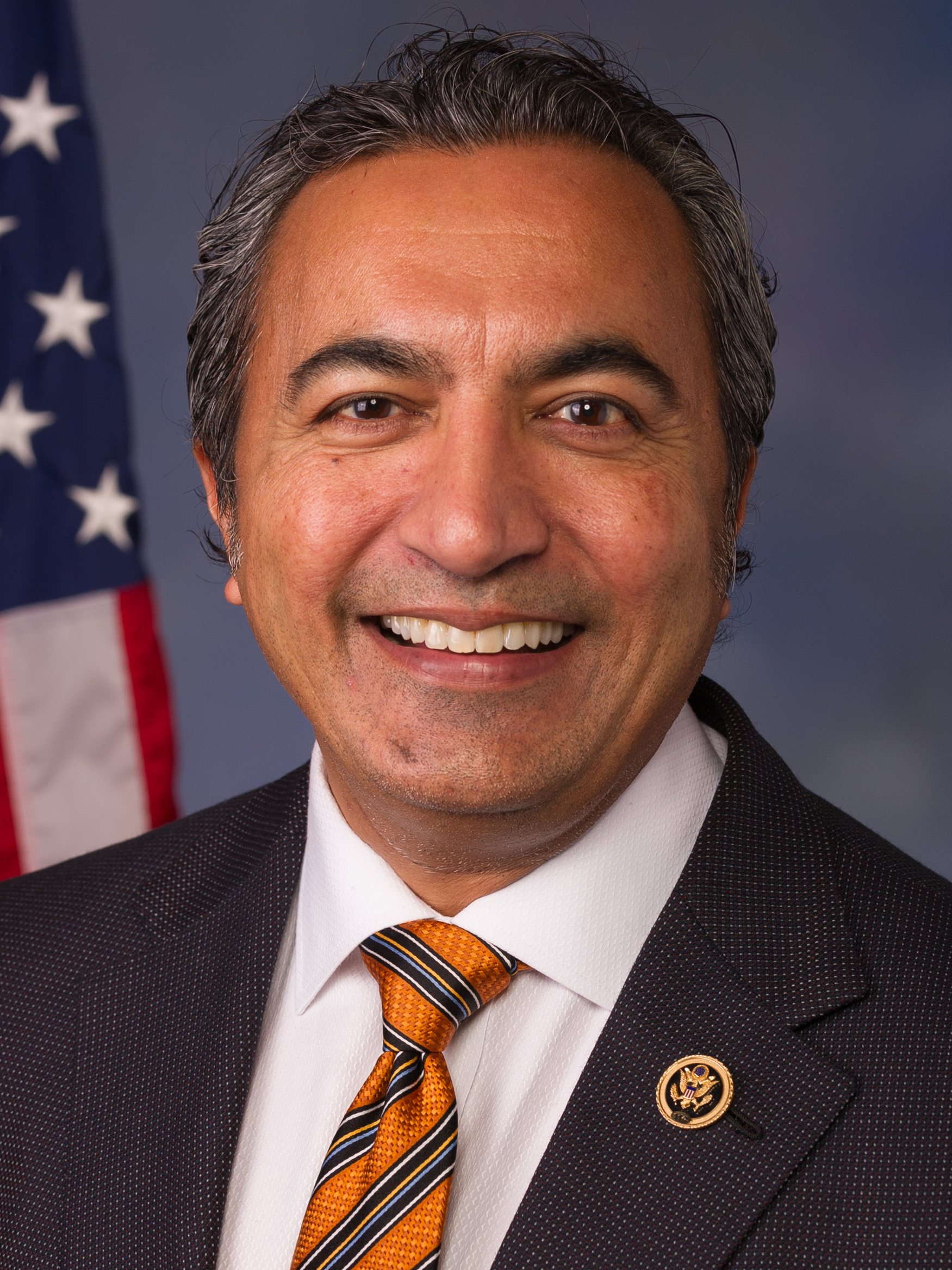

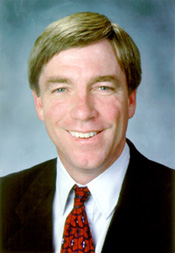
Nominee	Ami Bera	Doug Ose
Party	Democratic	Republican
Popular vote	92,521	91,066
Percentage	50.4%	49.6%
- County results Bera: 50–60%
U.S. Representative before election
Ami Bera
Democratic
Elected U.S. Representative
Ami Bera
Democratic

The 7th district is based in north central California and includes eastern Sacramento County. Incumbent Democrat Ami Bera, who had represented the 7th district since 2013, ran for re-election.

=== Primary election ===
==== Democratic candidates ====
===== Advanced to general =====
- Ami Bera, incumbent U.S. representative

==== Republican candidates ====
===== Advanced to general =====
- Doug Ose, former U.S. representative

===== Eliminated in primary =====
- Igor Birman, former chief of staff to Congressman Tom McClintock
- Elizabeth Emken, businesswoman, former nonprofit executive and candidate for the Senate in 2012

==== Libertarian candidates ====
===== Eliminated in primary =====
- Douglas Tuma, retired civil engineer

==== Endorsements ====
Doug Ose (R)

Organizations

- Folsom Chamber of Commerce
- Slavic International Pastors Association
- Western Growers Association

Local officials

- Eleanor L. Brown, trustee, Area 4, Sacramento County Board of Education
- Jeannie Bruins, Citrus Heights Council member
- Linda Budge, Rancho Cordova Council member
- Ted Costa, people's advocate
- Susan Frost, vice mayor of Citrus Heights
- Saul Hernandez, Board member, San Juan Unified School District
- Pat Hume, Elk Grove Council member
- Roberta MacGlashan, Sacramento County supervisor
- Larry Maskuoka, board member, San Juan Unified School District
- Steve Miklos, Folsom Council member
- Steve Miller, Citrus Heights Council member
- Andy Morin, Folsom Council member
- Greg Paulo, board member, San Juan Unified School District
- Susan Peters, Sacramento County supervisor
- JoAnne Reinking, board member, Folsom Cordova Unified School District
- Dave Sander, Rancho Cordova Council member
- Ernie Sheldon, vice mayor of Folsom
- Ed Short, board member, Folsom Cordova Unified School District
- Dan Skoglund, mayor of Rancho Cordova
- Jeff Slowey, Citrus Heights Council member
- Sandy Smoley, former Sacramento County supervisor
- Teresa Stanley, vice president, Folsom Cordova Unified School District
- Jeff Starsky, Folsom Council member
- Jim Streng, former Sacramento County supervisor
- Robert Trigg, Elk Grove Council member
- Mel Turner, mayor of Citrus Heights

Law enforcement individuals

- Glen Craig, former Sacramento County sheriff
- McGregor W. Scott, former U.S. attorney for the Eastern District of California
- Jan Scully, Sacramento County district attorney
- Sam Spiegel, former Folsom Police chief
- Robbie Waters, former Sacramento County sheriff

Law enforcement organizations

- California Police Chiefs Association
- Folsom Police Officers Association
- Peace Officers Research Association of California
- Sacramento County Deputy Sheriffs' Association
Igor Birman (R)

U.S. senators

- Mike Lee, U.S. senator
- Rand Paul, U.S. senator
- Fred Thompson, former U.S. senator

U.S. representatives

- Justin Amash, U.S. representative
- Tim Huelskamp, U.S. representative
- Jim Jordan, U.S. representative
- Raul Labrador, U.S. representative
- Thomas Massie, U.S. representative
- Tom McClintock, U.S. representative
- Mick Mulvaney, U.S. representative
- Ron Paul, former U.S. representative
- David Schweikert, U.S. representative

State officials

- Steve Poizner, former California insurance commissioner

Organizations

- California Taxpayer Protection Committee
- Citizens United
- The Conservative Victory Fund
- Eagle Forum
- Family Research Council
- FreedomWorks
- Gun Owners of America
- The Madison Project
- National Association for Gun Rights
- Republican Liberty Caucus
- Young Americans for Liberty

==== Polling ====
Poll source	Date(s) administered	Sample size	Margin of error	Ami Bera (D)	Igor Birman (R)	Elizabeth Emken (R)	Doug Ose (R)	Undecided
DCCC	May 1–2, 2014	567	± 4.1%	47%	17%	7%	22%	7%

==== Results ====
Nonpartisan blanket primary results
Party	Candidate	Votes	%
Democratic	Ami Bera (incumbent)	51,878	46.7
Republican	Doug Ose	29,307	26.4
Republican	Igor Birman	19,431	17.5
Republican	Elizabeth Emken	7,924	7.1
Libertarian	Douglas Arthur Tuma	1,629	1.5
No party preference	Phill A. Tufi	869	0.8
Total votes		111,038	100.0

=== General election ===
==== Campaign ====
More than $13 million from outside groups was spent during the campaign.

==== Endorsements ====
Ami Bera (D)

Organizations

- Democratic Congressional Campaign Committee "Frontline" Program
- No Labels
Doug Ose (R)

Organizations

- BIPAC
- National Republican Congressional Committee "Young Guns" Program

==== Debates ====
- Complete video of debate, October 8, 2014
- Complete transcript of debate, October 8, 2014

==== Polling ====
Poll source	Date(s) administered	Sample size	Margin of error	Ami Bera (D)	Doug Ose (R)	Undecided
New York Times/CBS News Battleground Tracker	October 16–23, 2014	404	± 7.0%	42%	48%	10%
Garin-Hart-Yang Research (D-House Majority PAC)	September 17–18, 2014	406	± 4.7%	47%	43%	10%

==== Predictions ====
Source	Ranking	As of
The Cook Political Report	Tossup	November 3, 2014
Rothenberg	Tossup	October 24, 2014
Sabato's Crystal Ball	Lean R (flip)	October 30, 2014
RCP	Tossup	November 2, 2014
Daily Kos Elections	Tossup	November 4, 2014

==== Results ====
California's 7th congressional district election, 2014
Party	Candidate	Votes	%
Democratic	Ami Bera (incumbent)	92,521	50.4
Republican	Doug Ose	91,066	49.6
Total votes		183,587	100.0
Democratic hold			

== District 8 ==
2014 California's 8th congressional district election
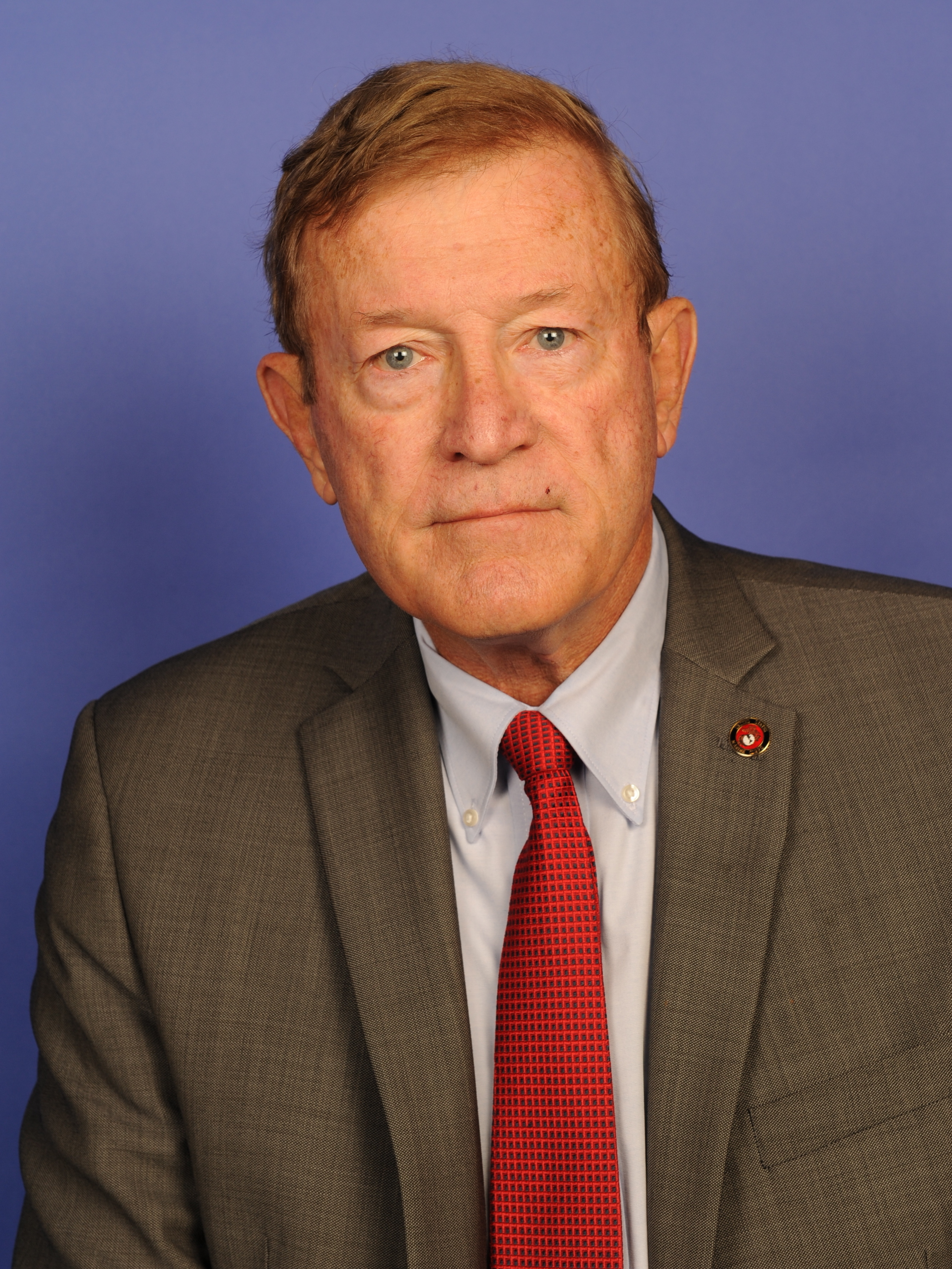

Nominee	Paul Cook	Bob Conaway
Party	Republican	Democratic
Popular vote	77,480	37,056
Percentage	67.6%	32.4%
- County results Cook: 50–60% 60–70%
U.S. Representative before election
Paul Cook
Republican
Elected U.S. Representative
Paul Cook
Republican

The 8th district is based in the eastern High Desert and includes Victorville and Yucaipa. Incumbent Republican Paul Cook, who had represented the 8th district since 2013, ran for re-election.

=== Primary election ===
==== Republican candidates ====
===== Advanced to general =====
- Paul Cook, incumbent U.S. representative

===== Eliminated in primary =====
- Paul Hannosh, teacher and small businessman

===== Withdrawn =====
- Rodney Lee Conover

==== Democratic candidates ====
===== Advanced to general =====
- Bob Conaway, attorney

===== Eliminated in primary =====
- Odessia Lee, retired public employee

===== Withdrawn =====
- John Pinkerton, president of Victor Valley College Board of Trustees and candidate for this seat in 2012

==== Results ====
Nonpartisan blanket primary results
Party	Candidate	Votes	%
Republican	Paul Cook (incumbent)	40,007	58.1
Democratic	Bob Conaway	12,885	18.7
Republican	Paul Hannosh	9,037	13.1
Democratic	Odessia D. Lee	6,930	10.1
Total votes		68,859	100.0

=== General election ===
==== Predictions ====
Source	Ranking	As of
The Cook Political Report	Safe R	November 3, 2014
Rothenberg	Safe R	October 24, 2014
Sabato's Crystal Ball	Safe R	October 30, 2014
RCP	Safe R	November 2, 2014
Daily Kos Elections	Safe R	November 4, 2014

==== Results ====
California's 8th congressional district election, 2014
Party	Candidate	Votes	%
Republican	Paul Cook (incumbent)	77,480	67.6
Democratic	Bob Conaway	37,056	32.4
Total votes		114,536	100.0
Republican hold			

== District 9 ==
2014 California's 9th congressional district election

Nominee	Jerry McNerney	Antonio "Tony" Amador
Party	Democratic	Republican
Popular vote	63,475	57,729
Percentage	52.4%	47.6%
- County results Mcnerney: 50–60% Amador: 60–70%
U.S. Representative before election
Jerry McNerney
Democratic
Elected U.S. Representative
Jerry McNerney
Democratic

The 9th district is based in the Central Valley and includes the San Joaquin Delta and Stockton. Incumbent Democrat Jerry McNerney, who had represented the 9th district since 2013 and previously represented the 11th district from 2007 to 2013, ran for re-election.

=== Primary election ===
==== Democratic candidates ====
===== Advanced to general =====
- Jerry McNerney, incumbent U.S. representative

==== Republican candidates ====
===== Advanced to general =====
- Antonio Amador, retired U.S. marshal

===== Eliminated in primary =====
- Steve Colangelo, small business owner
- Karen Mathews Davis, retired county clerk

==== Results ====
Nonpartisan blanket primary results
Party	Candidate	Votes	%
Democratic	Jerry McNerney (incumbent)	38,295	49.4
Republican	Antonio "Tony" Amador	20,424	26.3
Republican	Steve Anthony Colangelo	14,195	18.3
Republican	Karen "Mathews" Davis	4,637	6.0
Total votes		77,551	100.0

=== General election ===
==== Predictions ====
Source	Ranking	As of
The Cook Political Report	Safe D	November 3, 2014
Rothenberg	Safe D	October 24, 2014
Sabato's Crystal Ball	Safe D	October 30, 2014
RCP	Likely D	November 2, 2014
Daily Kos Elections	Safe D	November 4, 2014

==== Results ====
California's 9th congressional district election, 2014
Party	Candidate	Votes	%
Democratic	Jerry McNerney (incumbent)	63,475	52.4
Republican	Antonio "Tony" Amador	57,729	47.6
Total votes		121,204	100.0
Democratic hold			

== District 10 ==
2014 California's 10th congressional district election
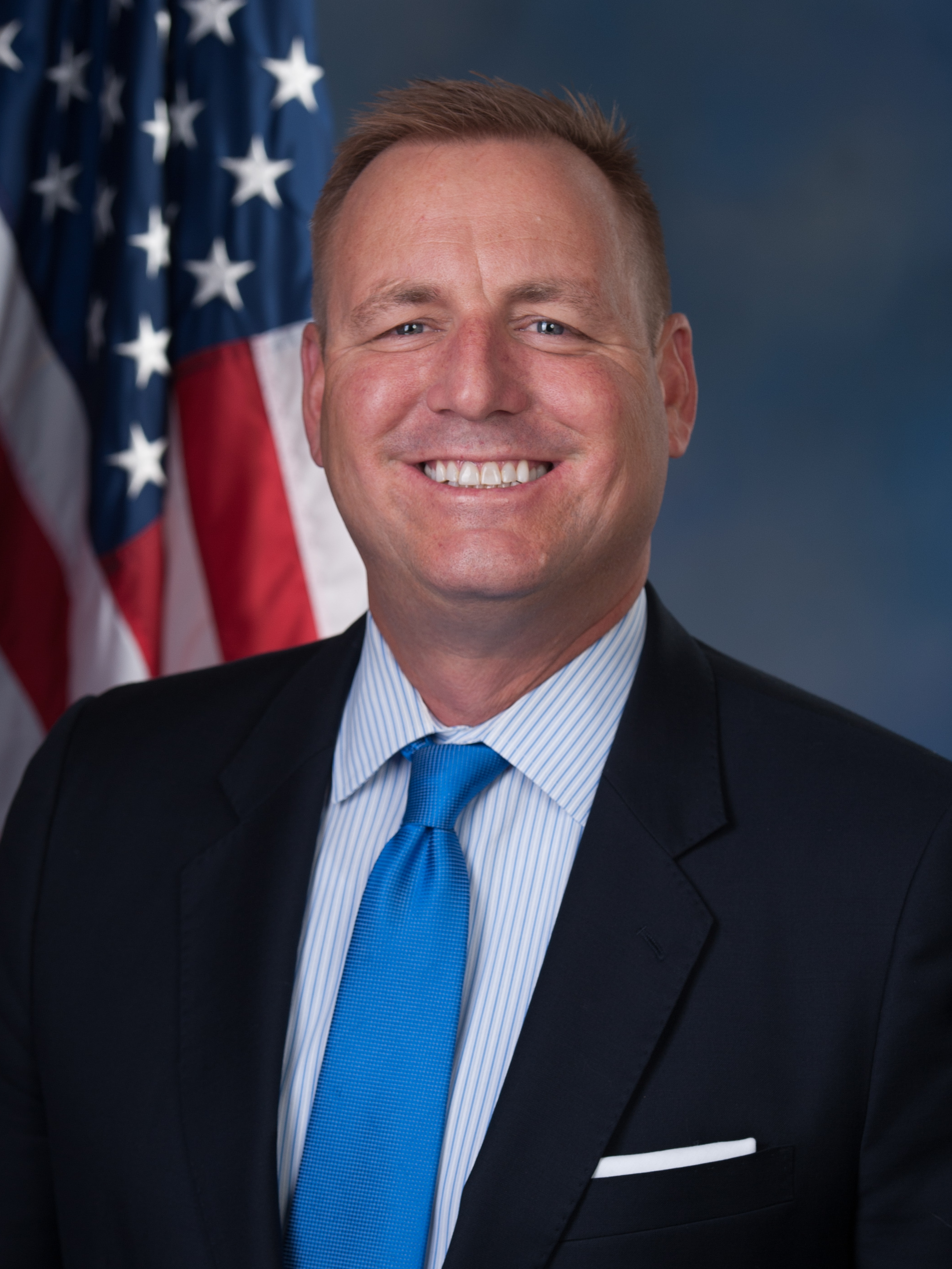

Nominee	Jeff Denham	Michael Eggman
Party	Republican	Democratic
Popular vote	70,582	55,123
Percentage	56.1%	43.9%
- County results Denham: 50–60%
U.S. Representative before election
Jeff Denham
Republican
Elected U.S. Representative
Jeff Denham
Republican

The 10th district is based in the Central Valley and includes Modesto and Tracy. Incumbent Republican Jeff Denham, who had represented the 10th district since 2013 and previously represented the 19th district from 2011 to 2013, ran for re-election.

=== Primary election ===
==== Republican candidates ====
===== Advanced to general =====
- Jeff Denham, incumbent U.S. representative

==== Democratic candidates ====
===== Advanced to general =====
- Michael Eggman, farmer, small businessman and younger brother of state assembly member Susan Eggman

===== Eliminated in primary =====
- Michael Barkley, accountant

===== Declined =====
- José M. Hernández, former NASA astronaut and general election candidate for this seat in 2012

==== Results ====
Nonpartisan blanket primary results
Party	Candidate	Votes	%
Republican	Jeff Denham (incumbent)	44,237	58.9
Democratic	Michael Eggman	19,804	26.4
Democratic	Michael J. "Mike" Barkley	11,005	14.7
No party preference	David Park Christensen (write-in)	2	0.0
Total votes		75,048	100.0

=== General election ===
==== Endorsements ====
Jeff Denham (R)

Organizations

- National Republican Congressional Committee "Patriot" Program
- No Labels
Michael Eggman (D)

Organizations

- Democratic Congressional Campaign Committee "Red to Blue" Program
- Progressive Change Campaign Committee

==== Forum ====
2014 California's 10th congressional district candidate forum
No.	Date	Host	Moderator	Link	Republican	Democratic
Key: P Participant A Absent N Not invited I Invited W Withdrawn						
Key: P Participant A Absent N Not invited I Invited W Withdrawn					Jeff Denham	Michael Eggman
1	Sep. 24, 2014	The Modesto Bee	Joe Kieta		P	P

==== Polling ====
Poll source	Date(s) administered	Sample size	Margin of error	Jeff Denham (R)	Michael Eggman (D)	Undecided
New York Times/CBS News Battleground Tracker	October 16–23, 2014	202	± 11%	47%	40%	13%
GBA Strategies (D-Eggman)	September 18–21, 2014	400	± 4.9%	49%	41%	10%

==== Predictions ====
Source	Ranking	As of
The Cook Political Report	Safe R	November 3, 2014
Rothenberg	Safe R	October 24, 2014
Sabato's Crystal Ball	Safe R	October 30, 2014
RCP	Safe R	November 2, 2014
Daily Kos Elections	Safe R	November 4, 2014

==== Results ====
California's 10th congressional district election, 2014
Party	Candidate	Votes	%
Republican	Jeff Denham (incumbent)	70,582	56.1
Democratic	Michael Eggman	55,123	43.9
Total votes		125,705	100.0
Republican hold			

== District 11 ==
2014 California's 11th congressional district election
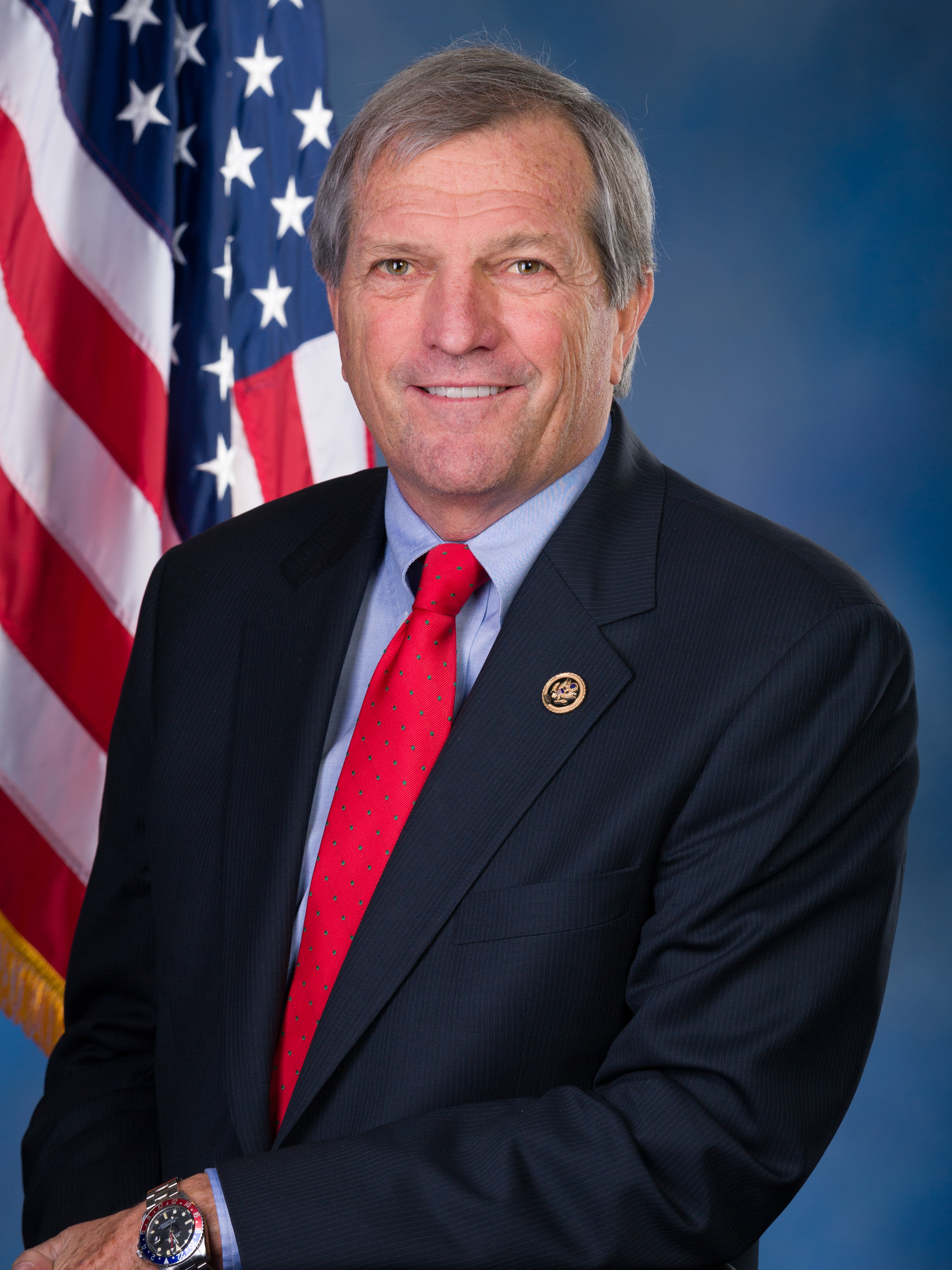

Nominee	Mark DeSaulnier	Tue Phan
Party	Democratic	Republican
Popular vote	117,502	57,160
Percentage	67.3%	32.7%
- County results Desaulnier: 60–70%
U.S. Representative before election
George Miller
Democratic
Elected U.S. Representative
Mark DeSaulnier
Democratic

The 11th district is based in the East Bay and includes Concord and Richmond. Incumbent Democrat George Miller, who had represented the 11th district since 2013 and previously represented the 7th district from 1975 to 2013, retired.

=== Primary election ===
==== Democratic candidates ====
===== Advanced to general =====
- Mark DeSaulnier, state senator and candidate for this seat in 2009

===== Eliminated in primary =====
- Tony Daysog, Alameda council member, candidate for the state assembly in 2006 and candidate for Mayor of Alameda in 2010
- Ki Ingersol
- Cheryl Sudduth, public policy advocate and candidate for this seat in 2012

===== Declined =====
- Susan Bonilla, state assembly member
- Joan Buchanan, state assembly and candidate for this seat in 2009
- John Garamendi, U.S. representative (running for re-election in the 3rd district)
- John Gioia, member of the Contra Costa County Board of Supervisors (running for re-election)
- Ro Khanna, former deputy assistant secretary in the United States Department of Commerce and candidate for the 12th district in 2004 (running in the 17th district)
- Kristina Lawson, mayor of Walnut Creek
- Gayle McLaughlin, Green Party mayor of Richmond
- George Miller, incumbent U.S. representative
- Kish Rajan, former Walnut Creek council member
- Tom Torlakson, California State Superintendent of Public Instruction (running for re-election)

==== Republican candidates ====
===== Advanced to general =====
- Tue Phan-Quang, retired immigration judge

===== Declined =====
- Mark Peterson, Contra Costa district attorney
- Mary Piepho, member of the Contra Costa County Board of Supervisors

==== Results ====
Nonpartisan blanket primary results
Party	Candidate	Votes	%
Democratic	Mark DeSaulnier	59,605	58.8
Republican	Tue Phan	28,242	27.9
Democratic	Cheryl Sudduth	4,913	4.8
Democratic	Tony Daysog	3,482	3.4
No party preference	Jason Ramey	2,673	2.6
Democratic	Ki Ingersol	2,313	2.3
American Independent	Virginia Fuller (write-in)	140	0.1
Total votes		101,368	100.0

=== General election ===
==== Predictions ====
Source	Ranking	As of
The Cook Political Report	Safe D	November 3, 2014
Rothenberg	Safe D	October 24, 2014
Sabato's Crystal Ball	Safe D	October 30, 2014
RCP	Safe D	November 2, 2014
Daily Kos Elections	Safe D	November 4, 2014

==== Results ====
California's 11th congressional district election, 2014
Party	Candidate	Votes	%
Democratic	Mark DeSaulnier	117,502	67.3
Republican	Tue Phan	57,160	32.7
Total votes		174,662	100.0
Democratic hold			

== District 12 ==
2014 California's 12th congressional district election
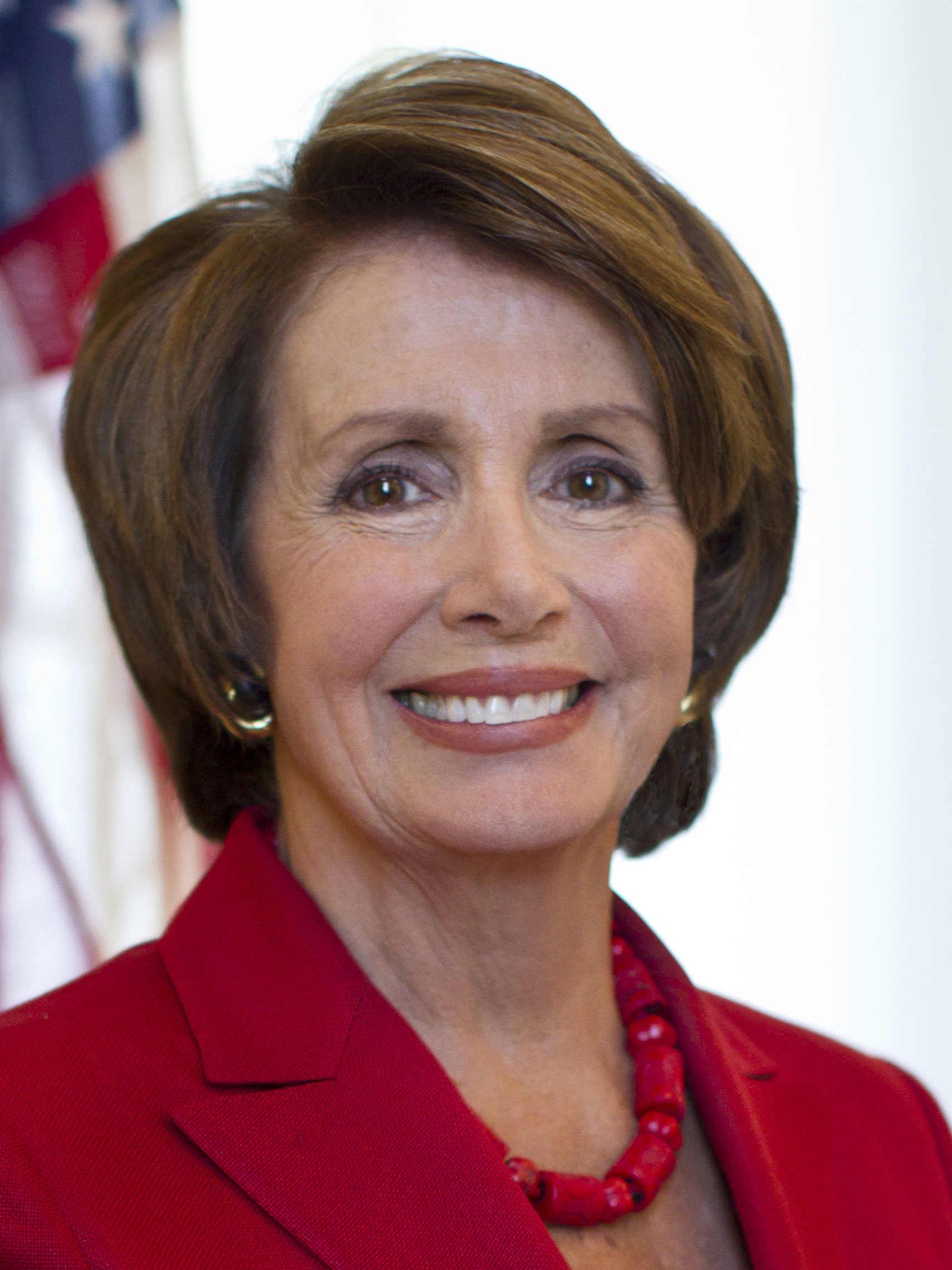

Nominee	Nancy Pelosi	John Dennis
Party	Democratic	Republican
Popular vote	160,067	32,197
Percentage	83.3%	16.7%
- County results Pelosi: 80–90%
U.S. Representative before election
Nancy Pelosi
Democratic
Elected U.S. Representative
Nancy Pelosi
Democratic

The 12th district is based in the Bay Area and includes most of San Francisco. House Democratic Leader and former Speaker Nancy Pelosi, who had represented the 12th district since 2013 and previously represented the 8th district from 1993 to 2013 and the 5th district from 1987 until 1993, ran for re-election.

=== Primary election ===
==== Democratic candidates ====
===== Advanced to general =====
- Nancy Pelosi, incumbent U.S. representative

===== Eliminated in primary =====
- David Peterson, accountability system developer and candidate for this seat in 2012
- Michael Steger, political organizer

==== Republican candidates ====
===== Advanced to general =====
- John Dennis, real estate developer and general election candidate for this seat in 2012

==== Green candidates ====
===== Eliminated in primary =====
- Barry Hermanson, candidate for this seat in 2012

==== Independent candidates ====
===== Eliminated in primary =====
- Desmond Thorsson, university instructor
- Jim Welles, lawyer

==== Results ====
Nonpartisan blanket primary results
Party	Candidate	Votes	%
Democratic	Nancy Pelosi (incumbent)	79,816	73.6
Republican	John Dennis	12,922	11.9
Green	Barry Hermanson	6,156	5.7
Democratic	David Peterson	3,774	3.5
Peace and Freedom	Frank Lara	2,107	1.9
Democratic	Michael Steger	1,514	1.4
No party preference	A. J. "Desmond" Thorsson	1,270	1.2
No party preference	James Welles	879	0.8
Total votes		108,438	100.0

=== General election ===
==== Predictions ====
Source	Ranking	As of
The Cook Political Report	Safe D	November 3, 2014
Rothenberg	Safe D	October 24, 2014
Sabato's Crystal Ball	Safe D	October 30, 2014
RCP	Safe D	November 2, 2014
Daily Kos Elections	Safe D	November 4, 2014

==== Endorsements ====
John Dennis (R)

Organizations

- Republican Liberty Caucus

==== Results ====
California's 12th congressional district election, 2014
Party	Candidate	Votes	%
Democratic	Nancy Pelosi (incumbent)	160,067	83.3
Republican	John Dennis	32,197	16.7
Total votes		192,264	100.0
Democratic hold			

== District 13 ==
2014 California's 13th congressional district election
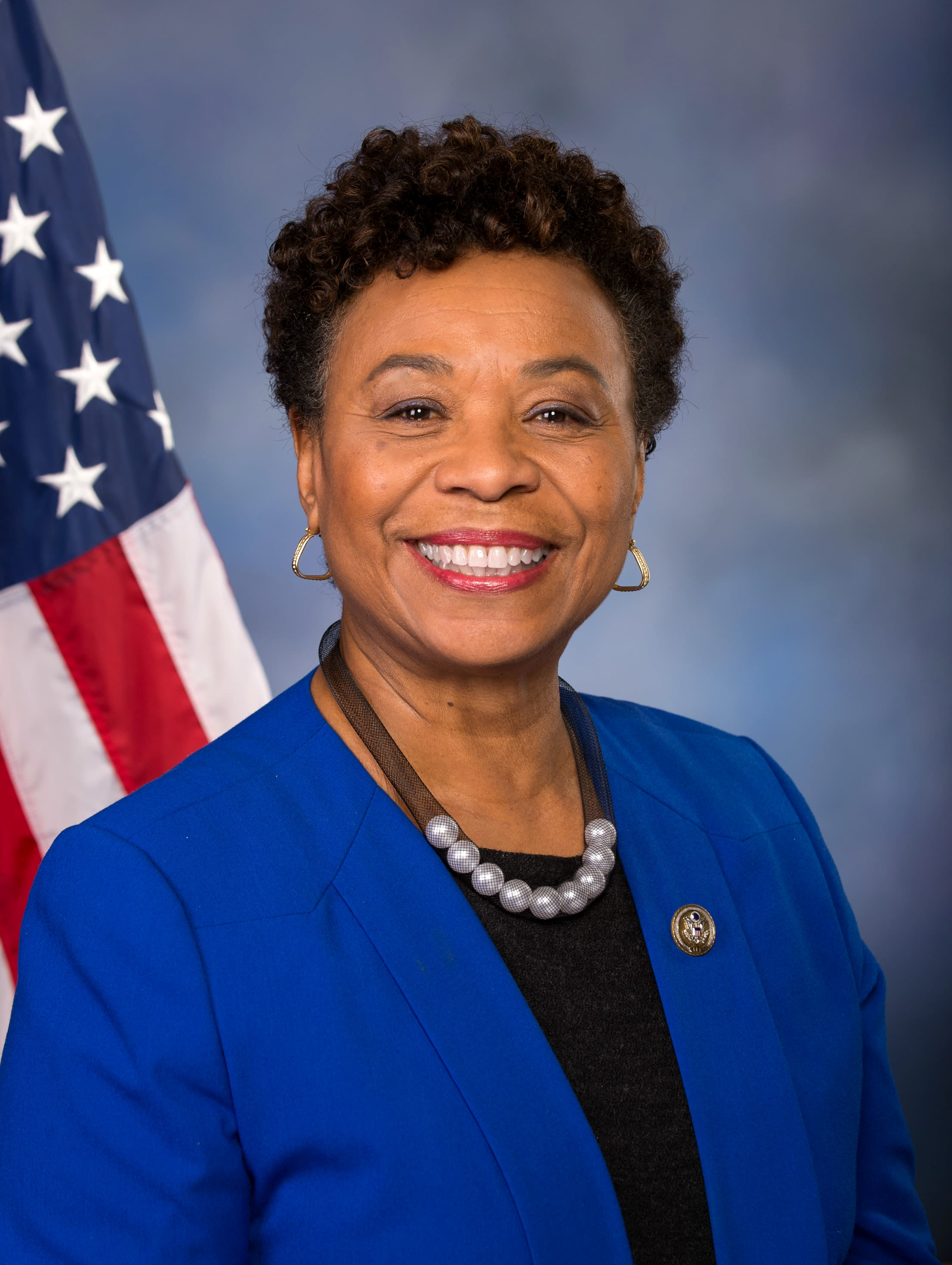

Nominee	Barbara Lee	Dakin Sundeen
Party	Democratic	Republican
Popular vote	168,491	21,940
Percentage	88.5%	11.5%
- County results Lee: 80–90%
U.S. Representative before election
Barbara Lee
Democratic
Elected U.S. Representative
Barbara Lee
Democratic

The 13th district is based in the East Bay and includes Berkeley and Oakland. Incumbent Democrat Barbara Lee, who had represented the 13th district since 2013 and previously represented the 9th district from 1998 to 2013, ran for re-election.

=== Primary election ===
==== Democratic candidates ====
===== Advanced to general =====
- Barbara Lee, incumbent U.S. representative

===== Eliminated in primary =====
- Justin Jelincic, nonprofit finance manager

==== Republican candidates ====
===== Advanced to general =====
- Dakin Sundeen, IT system administrator

==== Results ====
Nonpartisan blanket primary results
Party	Candidate	Votes	%
Democratic	Barbara Lee (incumbent)	77,461	82.6
Republican	Dakin Sundeen	9,533	10.2
Democratic	Justin Jelincic	4,602	4.9
Peace and Freedom	Lawrence N. Allen	2,190	2.3
Total votes		93,786	100.0

=== General election ===
==== Predictions ====
Source	Ranking	As of
The Cook Political Report	Safe D	November 3, 2014
Rothenberg	Safe D	October 24, 2014
Sabato's Crystal Ball	Safe D	October 30, 2014
RCP	Safe D	November 2, 2014
Daily Kos Elections	Safe D	November 4, 2014

==== Results ====
California's 13th congressional district election, 2014
Party	Candidate	Votes	%
Democratic	Barbara Lee (incumbent)	168,491	88.5
Republican	Dakin Sundeen	21,940	11.5
Total votes		190,431	100.0
Democratic hold			

== District 14 ==
2014 California's 14th congressional district election
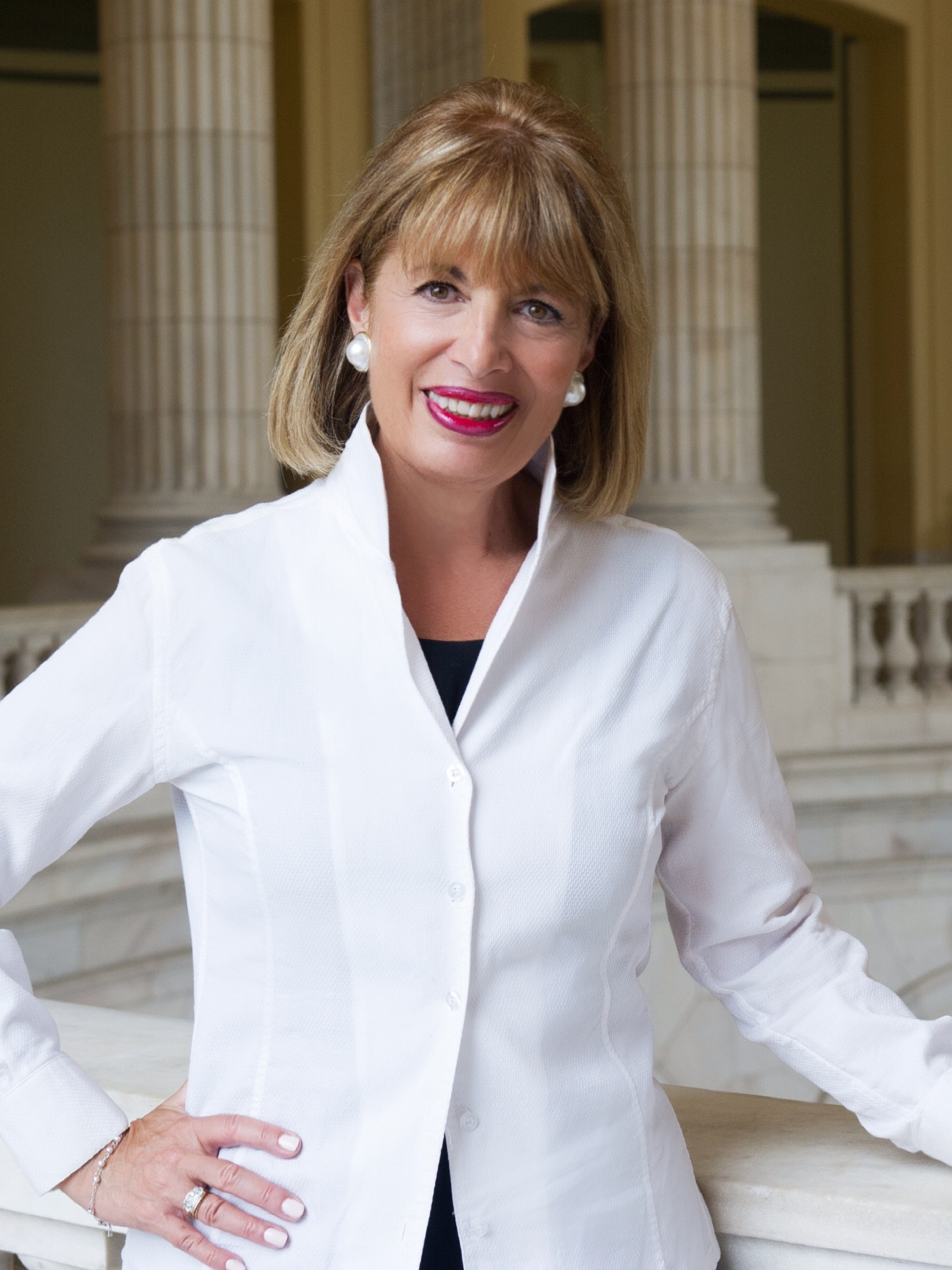

Nominee	Jackie Speier	Robin Chew
Party	Democratic	Republican
Popular vote	114,389	34,757
Percentage	76.7%	23.3%
- County results Speier: 70–80%
U.S. Representative before election
Jackie Speier
Democratic
Elected U.S. Representative
Jackie Speier
Democratic

The 14th district is based in the Bay Area and includes most of San Mateo County. Incumbent Democrat Jackie Speier, who had represented the 14th district since 2013 and previously represented the 12th district from 2008 to 2013, ran for re-election.

=== Primary election ===
==== Democratic candidates ====
===== Advanced to general =====
- Jackie Speier, incumbent U.S. representative

==== Republican candidates ====
===== Advanced to general =====
- Robin Chew, business owner and entrepreneur

==== Results ====
Nonpartisan blanket primary results
Party	Candidate	Votes	%
Democratic	Jackie Speier (incumbent)	66,800	77.4
Republican	Robin Chew	19,482	22.6
Total votes		86,282	100.0

=== General election ===
==== Predictions ====
Source	Ranking	As of
The Cook Political Report	Safe D	November 3, 2014
Rothenberg	Safe D	October 24, 2014
Sabato's Crystal Ball	Safe D	October 30, 2014
RCP	Safe D	November 2, 2014
Daily Kos Elections	Safe D	November 4, 2014

==== Results ====
California's 14th congressional district election, 2014
Party	Candidate	Votes	%
Democratic	Jackie Speier (incumbent)	114,389	76.7
Republican	Robin Chew	34,757	23.3
Total votes		149,146	100.0
Democratic hold			

== District 15 ==
2014 California's 15th congressional district election
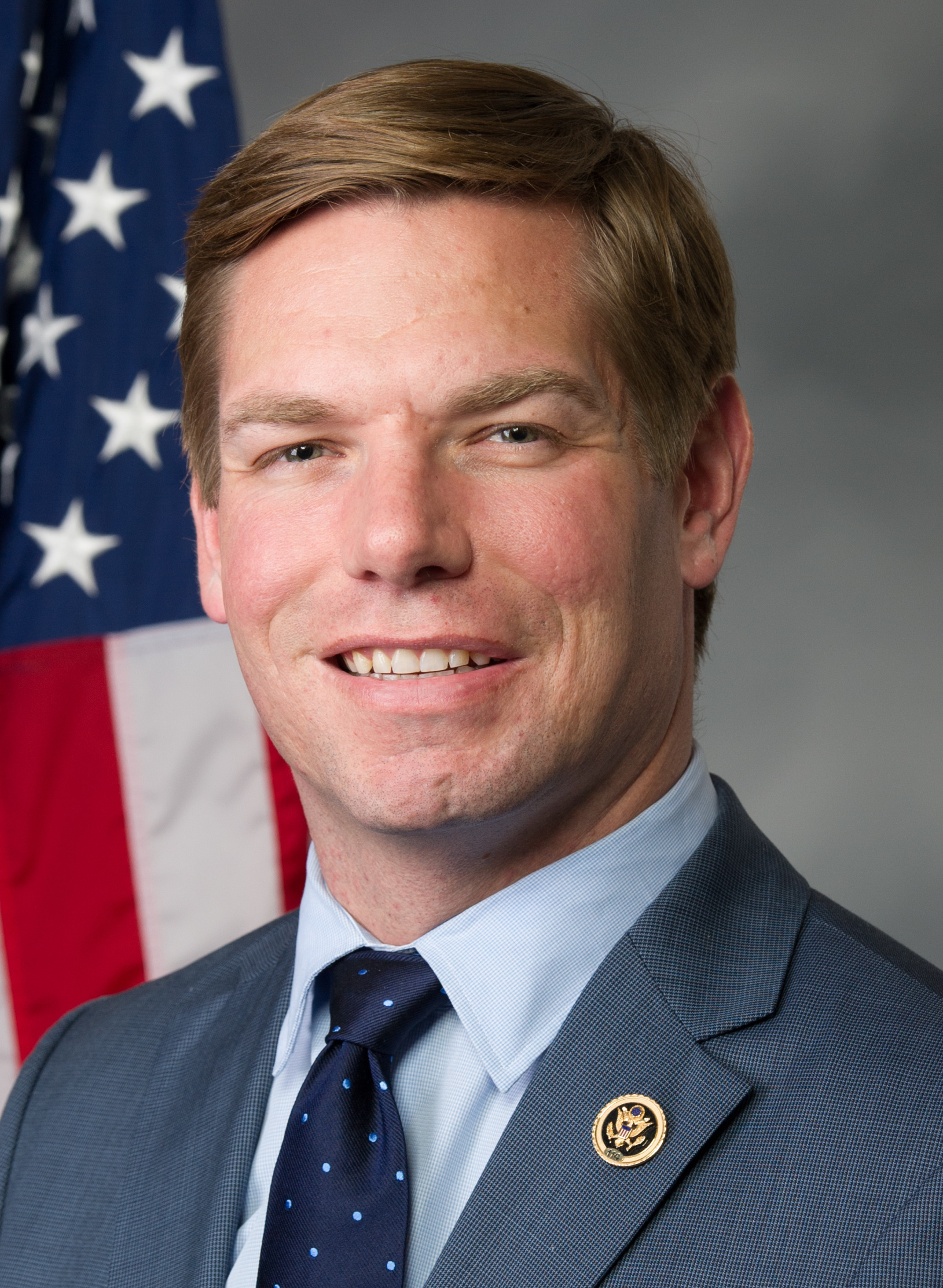

Nominee	Eric Swalwell	Hugh Bussell
Party	Democratic	Republican
Popular vote	99,756	43,150
Percentage	69.8%	30.2%
- County results Swalwell: 60–70% 70–80%
U.S. Representative before election
Eric Swalwell
Democratic
Elected U.S. Representative
Eric Swalwell
Democratic

The 15th district is based in the East Bay and includes Hayward and Livermore. Incumbent Democrat Eric Swalwell, who had represented the 15th district since 2013, ran for re-election.

=== Primary election ===
==== Democratic candidates ====
===== Advanced to general =====
- Eric Swalwell, incumbent U.S. representative

===== Eliminated in primary =====
- Ellen Corbett, state senator

===== Declined =====
- Ro Khanna, former deputy assistant secretary in the United States Department of Commerce and candidate for the 12th district in 2004 (running in the 17th district)

==== Republican candidates ====
===== Advanced to general =====
- Hugh Bussell, technology manager, educator and Alameda County Republican Party vice chair

==== Endorsements ====
Ellen Corbett (D)

U.S. representatives

- Pete Stark, former U.S. representative
Eric Swalwell (D)

U.S. executive branch officials

- Barack Obama, president of the United States

U.S. senators

- Dianne Feinstein, U.S. senator (1992–2023)

U.S. representatives

- Nancy Pelosi, House Minority Leader
- Debbie Wasserman Schultz, Democratic National Committee chair

==== Results ====
Nonpartisan blanket primary results
Party	Candidate	Votes	%
Democratic	Eric Swalwell (incumbent)	42,419	49.1
Republican	Hugh Bussell	22,228	25.7
Democratic	Ellen Corbett	21,798	25.2
Total votes		86,445	100.0

=== General election ===
==== Predictions ====
Source	Ranking	As of
The Cook Political Report	Safe D	November 3, 2014
Rothenberg	Safe D	October 24, 2014
Sabato's Crystal Ball	Safe D	October 30, 2014
RCP	Safe D	November 2, 2014
Daily Kos Elections	Safe D	November 4, 2014

==== Endorsements ====
Eric Swalwell (D)

U.S. executive branch officials

- Barack Obama, president of the United States

U.S. senators

- Dianne Feinstein, U.S. senator (1992–present)

U.S. representatives

- Nancy Pelosi, House Minority Leader
- Debbie Wasserman Schultz, Democratic National Committee chair

Organizations

- BIPAC

==== Results ====
California's 15th congressional district election, 2014
Party	Candidate	Votes	%
Democratic	Eric Swalwell (incumbent)	99,756	69.8
Republican	Hugh Bussell	43,150	30.2
Total votes		142,906	100.0
Democratic hold			

== District 16 ==
2014 California's 16th congressional district election
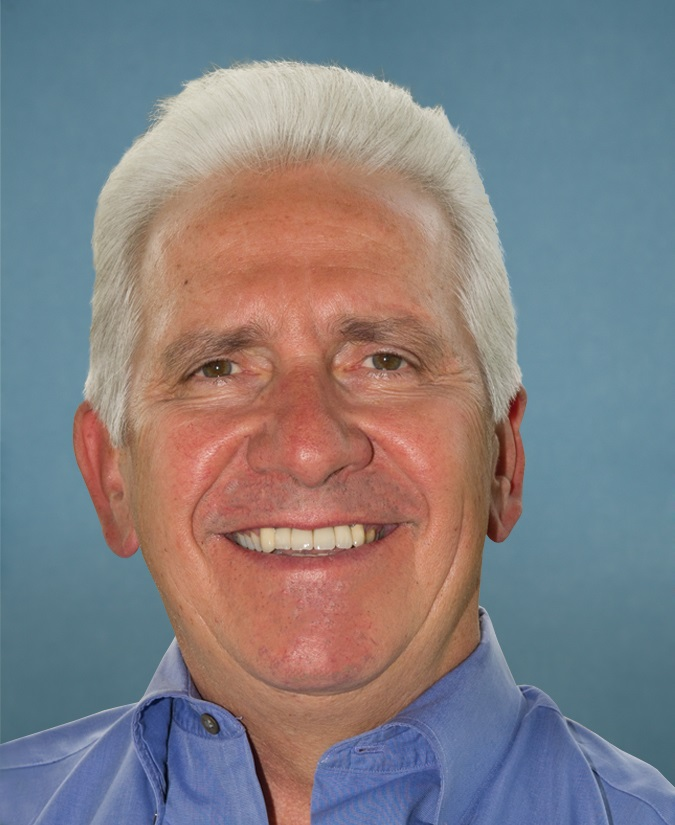

Nominee	Jim Costa	Johnny Tacherra
Party	Democratic	Republican
Popular vote	46,277	44,943
Percentage	50.7%	49.3%
- County results Costa: 60–70% Tacherra: 50–60% 60–70%
U.S. Representative before election
Jim Costa
Democratic
Elected U.S. Representative
Jim Costa
Democratic

The 16th district is based in the Central Valley and includes Fresno and Merced. Incumbent Democrat Jim Costa, who had represented the 16th district since 2013, and previously represented the 20th district from 2005 to 2013, ran for re-election.

=== Primary election ===
==== Democratic candidates ====
===== Advanced to general =====
- Jim Costa, incumbent U.S. representative

===== Eliminated in primary =====
- Job Melton, mental health therapist

===== Withdrawn =====
- Loraine Goodwin, physician, member of the California Democratic State Central Committee and candidate for this seat in 2012

==== Republican candidates ====
===== Advanced to general =====
- Johnny Tacherra, farmer and candidate for this seat in 2012

===== Eliminated in primary =====
- Joanna Botelho, farmer and businesswoman
- Steve Crass, attorney
- Mel Levey, military officer

==== Results ====
Nonpartisan blanket primary results
Party	Candidate	Votes	%
Democratic	Jim Costa (incumbent)	25,586	44.3
Republican	Johnny Tacherra	12,542	21.7
Republican	Steve Crass	8,877	15.4
Republican	Mel Levey	4,565	7.9
Republican	Joanna Garcia-Botelho	3,827	6.6
Democratic	Job Melton	2,370	4.1
Total votes		57,767	100.0

=== General election ===
==== Predictions ====
Source	Ranking	As of
The Cook Political Report	Safe D	November 3, 2014
Rothenberg	Safe D	October 24, 2014
Sabato's Crystal Ball	Safe D	October 30, 2014
RCP	Safe D	November 2, 2014
Daily Kos Elections	Safe D	November 4, 2014

==== Endorsements ====
Jim Costa (D)

Organizations

- Blue Dog Coalition

==== Results ====
California's 16th congressional district election, 2014
Party	Candidate	Votes	%
Democratic	Jim Costa (incumbent)	46,277	50.7
Republican	Johnny Tacherra	44,943	49.3
Total votes		91,220	100.0
Democratic hold			

== District 17 ==
2014 California's 17th congressional district election
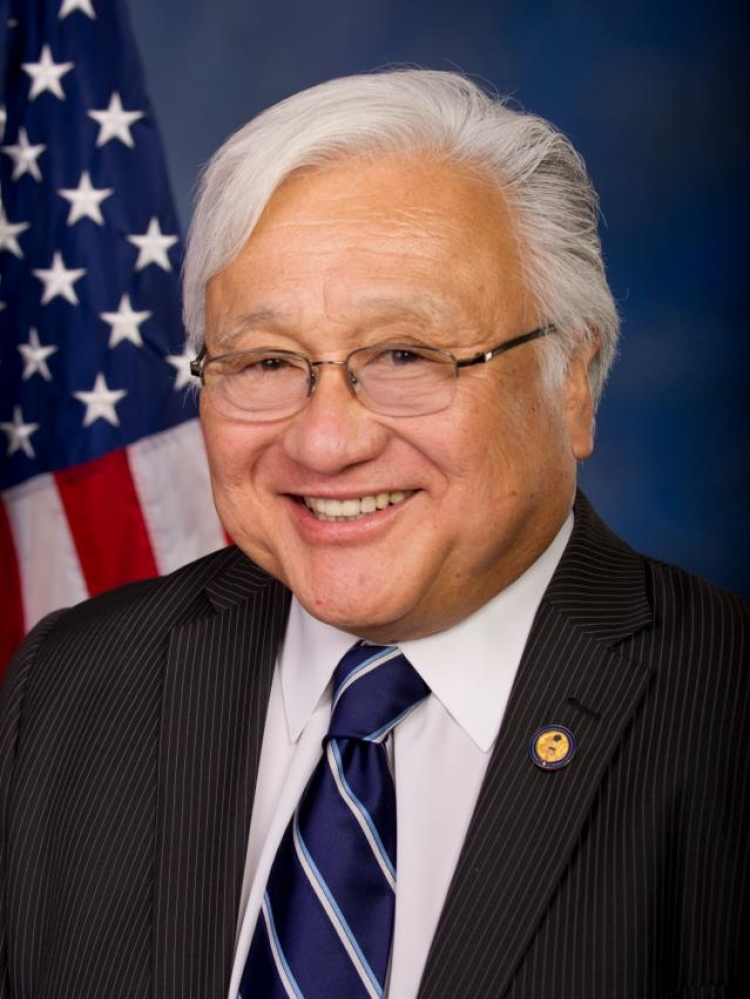

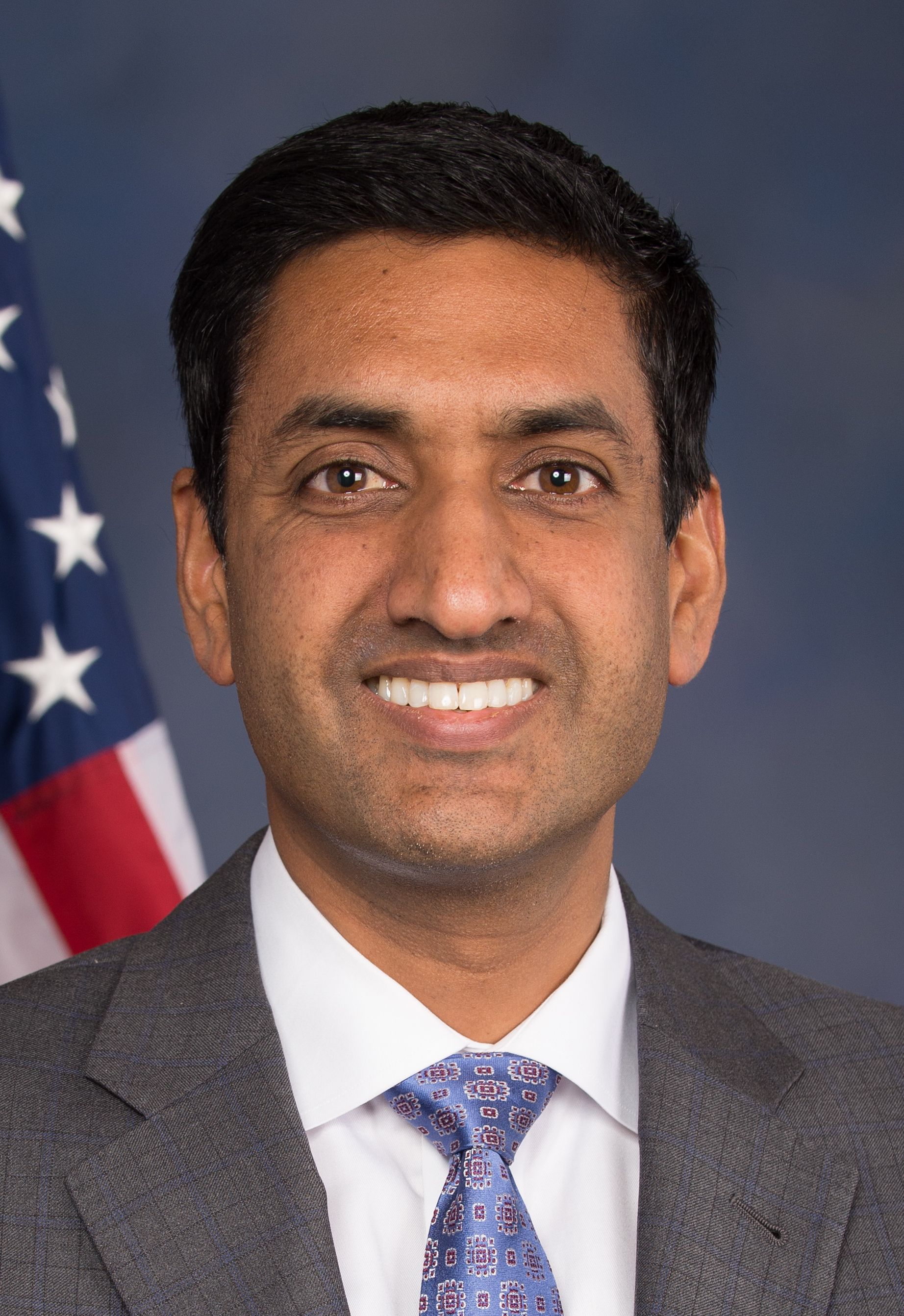
Nominee	Mike Honda	Ro Khanna
Party	Democratic	Democratic
Popular vote	69,561	64,847
Percentage	51.8%	48.2%
U.S. Representative before election
Mike Honda
Democratic
Elected U.S. Representative
Mike Honda
Democratic

The 17th district is based in the Bay Area and includes Sunnyvale, Cupertino, Santa Clara, Fremont, and Milpitas. Incumbent Democrat Mike Honda, who had represented the 17th district since 2013 and previously represented the 15th district from 2001 to 2013, ran for re-election.

=== Primary election ===
==== Democratic candidates ====
===== Advanced to general =====
- Mike Honda, incumbent U.S. representative
- Ro Khanna, former deputy assistant secretary in the United States Department of Commerce and candidate for the 12th district in 2004

==== Republican candidates ====
===== Eliminated in primary =====
- Vanila Singh, professor and physician
- Joel Vanlandingham, tech recruiting executive

===== Disqualified =====
- Vinesh Singh Rathore, attorney for Google

==== Campaign ====
A lawsuit was filed before the Sacramento County Superior Court alleging that Khanna had recruited candidates with similar names to enter the race as Republicans to split the Republican vote three ways. On March 28, the court disqualified one of the candidates and ruled that Khanna had no connection with the incident.

==== Endorsements ====
Mike Honda (D)

U.S. executive branch officials

- Barack Obama, president of the United States

Organizations

- People for the American Way
- Progressive Change Campaign Committee
Ro Khanna (D)

Local officials

- Chuck Reed, mayor of San Jose

Organizations

- No Labels
- San Jose Silicon Valley Chamber of Commerce

Newspapers

- Contra Costa Times
- The Mercury News
- Oakland Tribune
- San Francisco Chronicle

==== Polling ====
Poll source	Date(s) administered	Sample size	Margin of error	Mike Honda (D)	Ro Khanna (D)	Vanila Singh (R)	Joel Vanlandingham (R)	Undecided
SurveyUSA	May 20–22, 2014	825	± 4.4%	40%	21%	8%	6%	24%
Public Policy Polling (D-PCCC)	February 13–16, 2014	270	± 6%	45%	26%	29%	—	—

==== Results ====
Nonpartisan blanket primary results
Party	Candidate	Votes	%
Democratic	Mike Honda (incumbent)	43,607	48.2
Democratic	Ro Khanna	25,384	28.0
Republican	Vanila Singh	15,359	17.0
Republican	Joel VanLandingham	6,154	6.8
Total votes		90,504	100.0

=== General election ===
==== Debates ====
- Complete video of debate, October 6, 2014

==== Polling ====
Poll source	Date(s) administered	Sample size	Margin of error	Mike Honda (D)	Ro Khanna (D)	Undecided
New York Times/CBS News Battleground Tracker	October 16–23, 2014	85	± 16.0%	41%	32%	26%
David Binder Research (D-Khanna)	October 8–9, 2014	400	± 4.9%	38%	38%	24%
Lake Research Partners (D-Honda)	October 7–12, 2014	500	± 4.4%	42%	27%	31%
Public Policy Polling (D-Democracy for America)	February 13–16, 2014	505	± 4.4%	61%	39%	—
Public Policy Polling (D-PCCC)	August 2–4, 2013	806	± 3.5%	49%	15%	36%

Hypothetical polling

Poll source	Date(s) administered	Sample size	Margin of error	Mike Honda (D)	Vanila Singh (R)	Undecided
Public Policy Polling (D-PCCC)	February 13–16, 2014	505	± 4.4%	69%	31%	—

==== Predictions ====
Source	Ranking	As of
The Cook Political Report	Safe D	November 3, 2014
Rothenberg	Safe D	October 24, 2014
Sabato's Crystal Ball	Safe D	October 30, 2014
RCP	Safe D	November 2, 2014
Daily Kos Elections	Safe D	November 4, 2014

==== Results ====
California's 17th congressional district election, 2014
Party	Candidate	Votes	%
Democratic	Mike Honda (incumbent)	69,561	51.8
Democratic	Ro Khanna	64,847	48.2
Total votes		134,408	100.0
Democratic hold			

== District 18 ==
2014 California's 18th congressional district election
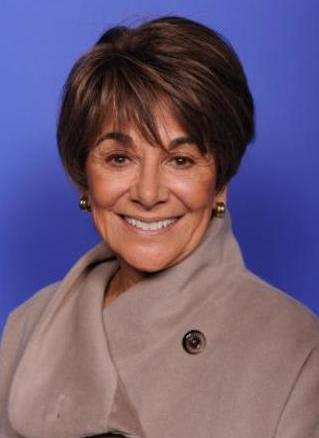

Nominee	Anna Eshoo	Richard B. Fox
Party	Democratic	Republican
Popular vote	133,060	63,326
Percentage	67.8%	32.2%
- County results Eshoo: 60–70% 70–80%
U.S. Representative before election
Anna Eshoo
Democratic
Elected U.S. Representative
Anna Eshoo
Democratic

The 18th district is based in the Bay Area and includes Palo Alto, Redwood City, and Saratoga. Incumbent Democrat Anna Eshoo, who had represented the 18th district since 2013 and previously represented the 14th district from 1993 to 2013, ran for re-election.

=== Primary election ===
==== Democratic candidates ====
===== Advanced to general =====
- Anna Eshoo, incumbent U.S. representative

==== Republican candidates ====
===== Advanced to general =====
- Richard Fox, pediatrician and healthcare attorney

===== Eliminated in primary =====
- Bruce Anderson, high school teacher
- Oscar Alejandro Braun, healthcare website publisher

===== Withdrawn =====
- Wilson Farrar

==== Results ====
Nonpartisan blanket primary results
Party	Candidate	Votes	%
Democratic	Anna Eshoo (incumbent)	81,295	67.6
Republican	Richard B. Fox	27,111	22.5
Republican	Bruce Anderson	9,644	8.0
Republican	Oscar Alejandro Braun	2,190	1.8
Total votes		120,240	100.0

=== General election ===
==== Predictions ====
Source	Ranking	As of
The Cook Political Report	Safe D	November 3, 2014
Rothenberg	Safe D	October 24, 2014
Sabato's Crystal Ball	Safe D	October 30, 2014
RCP	Safe D	November 2, 2014
Daily Kos Elections	Safe D	November 4, 2014

==== Results ====
California's 18th congressional district election, 2014
Party	Candidate	Votes	%
Democratic	Anna Eshoo (incumbent)	133,060	67.8
Republican	Richard B. Fox	63,326	32.2
Total votes		196,386	100.0
Democratic hold			

== District 19 ==
2014 California's 19th congressional district election
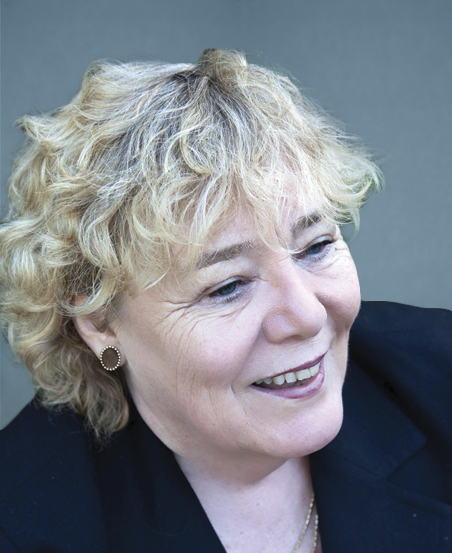

Nominee	Zoe Lofgren	Robert Murray
Party	Democratic	Democratic
Popular vote	85,888	41,900
Percentage	67.2%	32.8%
U.S. Representative before election
Zoe Lofgren
Democratic
Elected U.S. Representative
Zoe Lofgren
Democratic

The 19th district is based in the South Bay and includes most of San Jose. Incumbent Democrat Zoe Lofgren, who had represented the 19th district since 2013 and previously represented the 16th district from 1995 to 2013, ran for re-election.

=== Primary election ===
==== Democratic candidates ====
===== Advanced to general =====
- Zoe Lofgren, incumbent U.S. representative
- Robert Murray, businessman

==== Results ====
Nonpartisan blanket primary results
Party	Candidate	Votes	%
Democratic	Zoe Lofgren (incumbent)	63,845	76.0
Democratic	Robert Murray	20,132	24.0
Total votes		83,977	100.0

=== General election ===
==== Predictions ====
Source	Ranking	As of
The Cook Political Report	Safe D	November 3, 2014
Rothenberg	Safe D	October 24, 2014
Sabato's Crystal Ball	Safe D	October 30, 2014
RCP	Safe D	November 2, 2014
Daily Kos Elections	Safe D	November 4, 2014

==== Results ====
California's 19th congressional district election, 2014
Party	Candidate	Votes	%
Democratic	Zoe Lofgren (incumbent)	85,888	67.2
Democratic	Robert Murray	41,900	32.8
Total votes		127,788	100.0
Democratic hold			

== District 20 ==
2014 California's 20th congressional district election
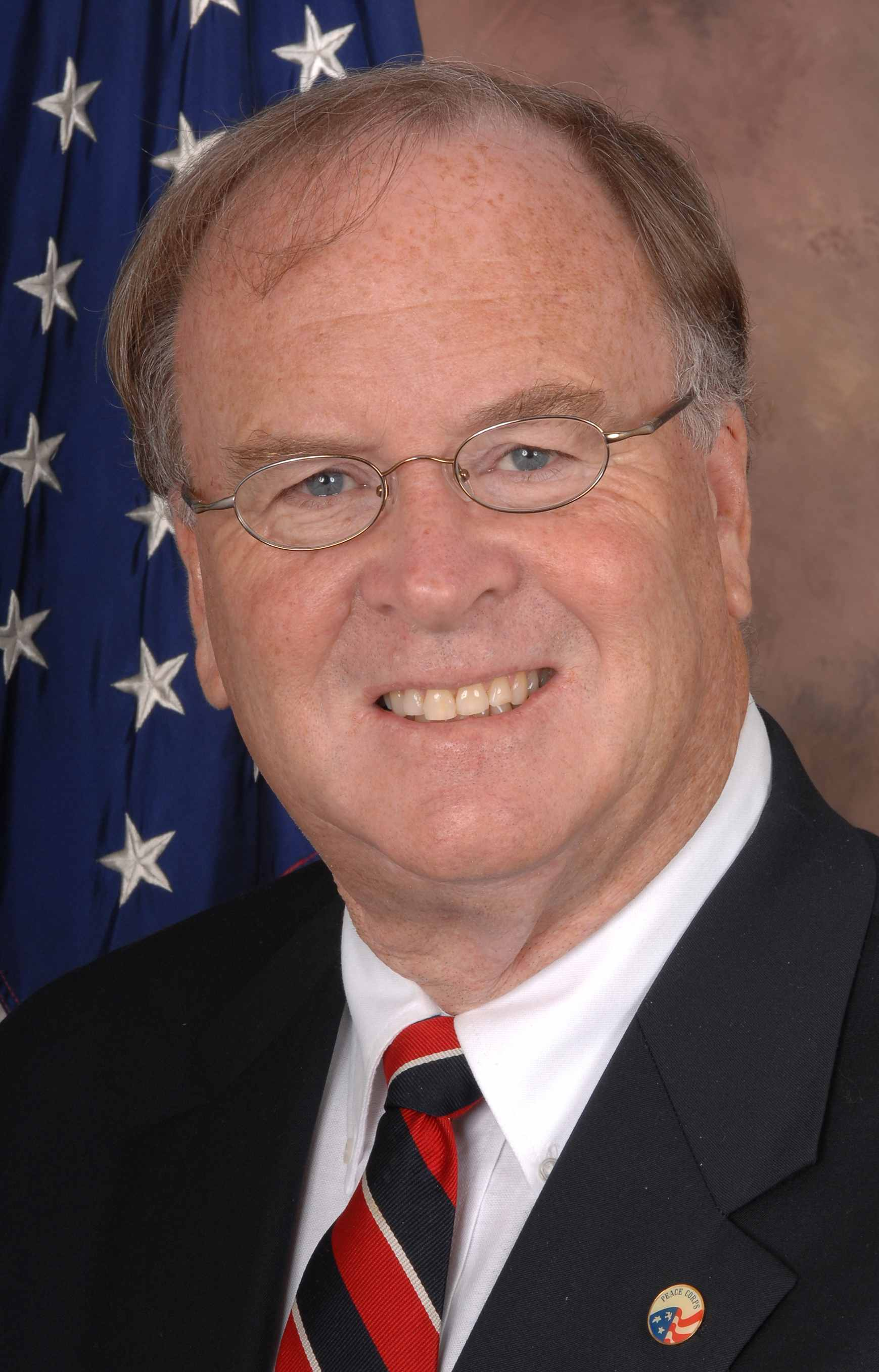

Nominee	Sam Farr	Ronald Paul Kabat
Party	Democratic	No party preference
Popular vote	106,034	35,010
Percentage	75.2%	24.8%
- County results Farr: 60–70% 70–80% 80–90%
U.S. Representative before election
Sam Farr
Democratic
Elected U.S. Representative
Sam Farr
Democratic

The 20th district is based in the Central Coast and includes Monterey and Santa Cruz. Incumbent Democrat Sam Farr, who had represented the 20th district since 2013 and previously represented the 17th district from 1993 to 2013, ran for re-election.

=== Primary election ===
==== Democratic candidates ====
===== Advanced to general =====
- Sam Farr, incumbent U.S. representative

==== Independent candidates ====
===== Advanced to general =====
- Ronald Paul Kabat, certified public accountant

==== Results ====
Nonpartisan blanket primary results
Party	Candidate	Votes	%
Democratic	Sam Farr (incumbent)	67,528	73.8
No party preference	Ronald Paul Kabat	23,590	26.2
Total votes		91,118	100.0

=== General election ===
==== Predictions ====
Source	Ranking	As of
The Cook Political Report	Safe D	November 3, 2014
Rothenberg	Safe D	October 24, 2014
Sabato's Crystal Ball	Safe D	October 30, 2014
RCP	Safe D	November 2, 2014
Daily Kos Elections	Safe D	November 4, 2014

==== Results ====
California's 20th congressional district election, 2014
Party	Candidate	Votes	%
Democratic	Sam Farr (incumbent)	106,034	75.2
No party preference	Ronald Paul Kabat	35,010	24.8
Total votes		141,044	100.0
Democratic hold			

== District 21 ==
2014 California's 21st congressional district election
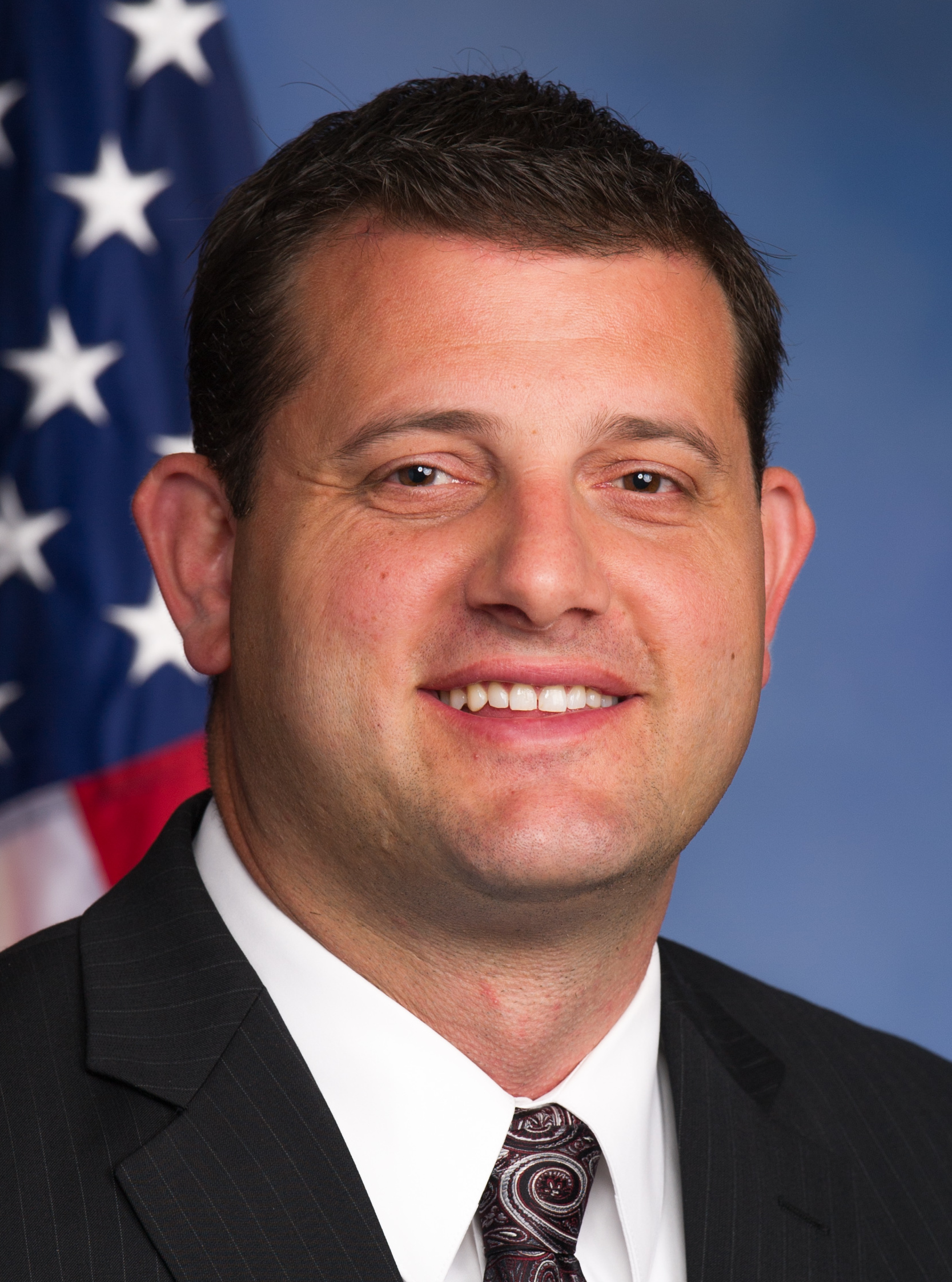

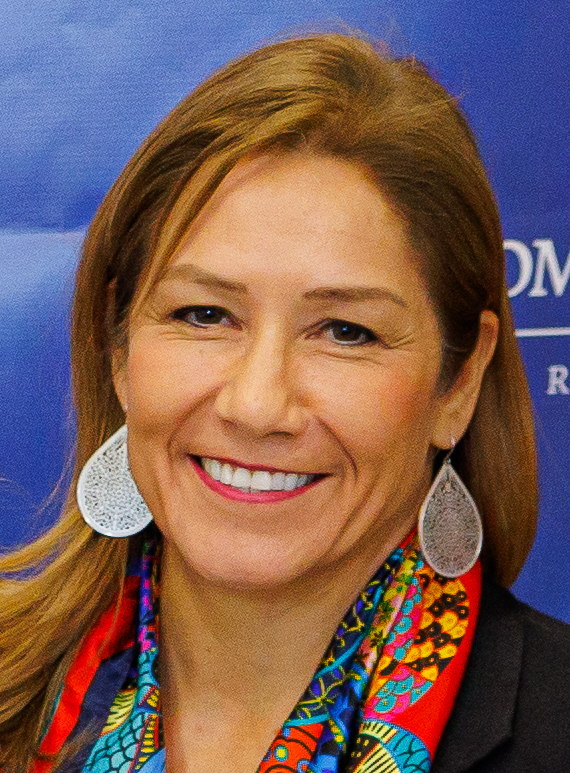
Nominee	David Valadao	Amanda Renteria
Party	Republican	Democratic
Popular vote	45,907	33,470
Percentage	57.8%	42.2%
- County results Valadao: 50–60% 60–70% 70–80% Renteria: 50–60%
U.S. Representative before election
David Valadao
Republican
Elected U.S. Representative
David Valadao
Republican

The 21st district is based in the Central Valley and includes Hanford and parts of Bakersfield. Incumbent Republican David Valadao, who had represented the 21st district since 2013, ran for re-election.

=== Primary election ===
==== Republican candidates ====
===== Advanced to general =====
- David Valadao, incumbent U.S. representative

==== Democratic candidates ====
===== Advanced to general =====
- Amanda Renteria, former chief of staff for Senator Debbie Stabenow

===== Eliminated in primary =====
- John Hernandez, chief executive officer of the Central California Hispanic Chamber of Commerce and the general election candidate for this seat in 2012

==== Polling ====
Poll source	Date(s) administered	Sample size	Margin of error	David Valadao (R)	John Hernandez (D)	Amanda Renteria (D)	Undecided
Harper Polling (R-NRCC)	February 2014	517	± 4.31%	45%	25%	13%	17%

==== Results ====
Nonpartisan blanket primary results
Party	Candidate	Votes	%
Republican	David Valadao (incumbent)	28,773	63.0
Democratic	Amanda Renteria	11,682	25.6
Democratic	John Hernandez	5,232	11.5
Total votes		45,687	100.0

=== General election ===
==== Endorsements ====
David Valadao (R)

Organizations

- BIPAC
- National Republican Congressional Committee "Patriot" Program
Amanda Renteria (D)

Organizations

- Democratic Congressional Campaign Committee "Red to Blue" Program
- EMILY's List

==== Debates ====
- Complete video of debate, October 8, 2014

==== Polling ====
Poll source	Date(s) administered	Sample size	Margin of error	David Valadao (R)	Amanda Renteria (D)	Undecided
SurveyUSA	October 15–20, 2014	554	± 4.3%	47%	42%	11%
SurveyUSA	September 3–8, 2014	517	± 4.7%	56%	37%	7%

==== Predictions ====
Source	Ranking	As of
The Cook Political Report	Lean R	November 3, 2014
Rothenberg	Likely R	October 24, 2014
Sabato's Crystal Ball	Likely R	October 30, 2014
RCP	Lean R	November 2, 2014
Daily Kos Elections	Lean R	November 4, 2014

==== Results ====
California's 21st congressional district election, 2014
Party	Candidate	Votes	%
Republican	David Valadao (incumbent)	45,907	57.8
Democratic	Amanda Renteria	33,470	42.2
Total votes		79,377	100.0
Republican hold			

== District 22 ==
2014 California's 22nd congressional district election
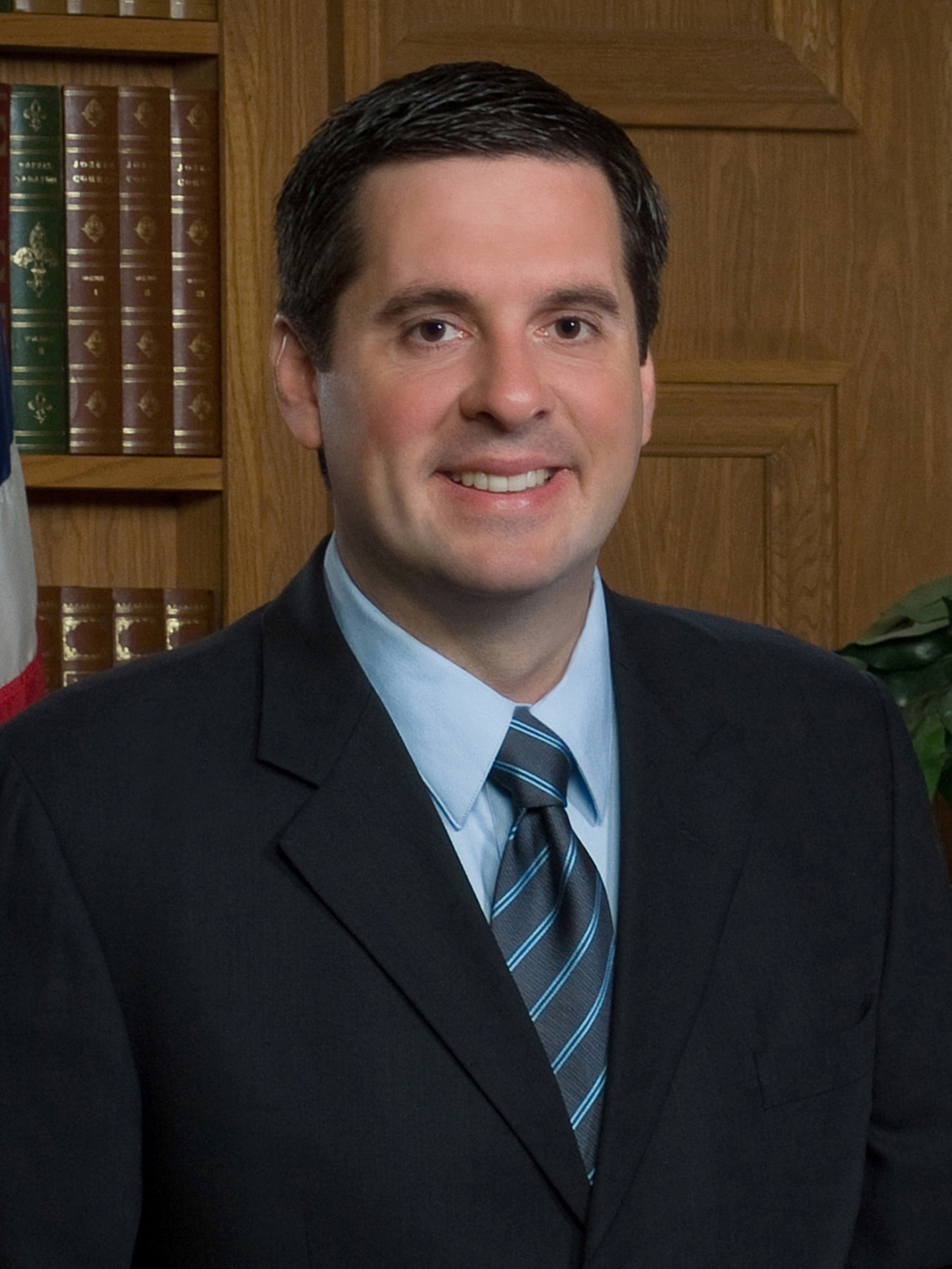

Nominee	Devin Nunes	Suzanna "Sam" Aguilera-Marreno
Party	Republican	Democratic
Popular vote	96,053	37,289
Percentage	72.0%	28.0%
- County results Nunes: 70–80%
U.S. Representative before election
Devin Nunes
Republican
Elected U.S. Representative
Devin Nunes
Republican

The 22nd district is based in the Central Valley and includes Clovis, Tulare, and Visalia. Incumbent Republican Devin Nunes, who had represented the 22nd district since 2013 and previously represented the 21st district from 2003 to 2013, ran for re-election.

=== Primary election ===
==== Republican candidates ====
===== Advanced to general =====
- Devin Nunes, incumbent U.S. representative

===== Eliminated in primary =====
- John Catano

==== Democratic candidates ====
===== Advanced to general =====
- Suzanna Aguilera-Marreno, retired correctional captain

==== Results ====
Nonpartisan blanket primary results
Party	Candidate	Votes	%
Republican	Devin Nunes (incumbent)	69,139	72.2
Democratic	Suzanna "Sam" Aguilera-Marreno	26,671	27.8
Republican	John P. Catano	6,403	7.2
Total votes		89,100	100.0

=== General election ===
==== Predictions ====
Source	Ranking	As of
The Cook Political Report	Safe R	November 3, 2014
Rothenberg	Safe R	October 24, 2014
Sabato's Crystal Ball	Safe R	October 30, 2014
RCP	Safe R	November 2, 2014
Daily Kos Elections	Safe R	November 4, 2014

==== Endorsements ====
Suzanna Aguilera-Marreno (D)

Organizations

- Progressive Democrats of America

==== Results ====
California's 22nd congressional district election, 2014
Party	Candidate	Votes	%
Republican	Devin Nunes (incumbent)	96,053	72.0
Democratic	Suzanna "Sam" Aguilera-Marreno	37,289	28.0
Total votes		133,342	100.0
Republican hold			

== District 23 ==
2014 California's 23rd congressional district election
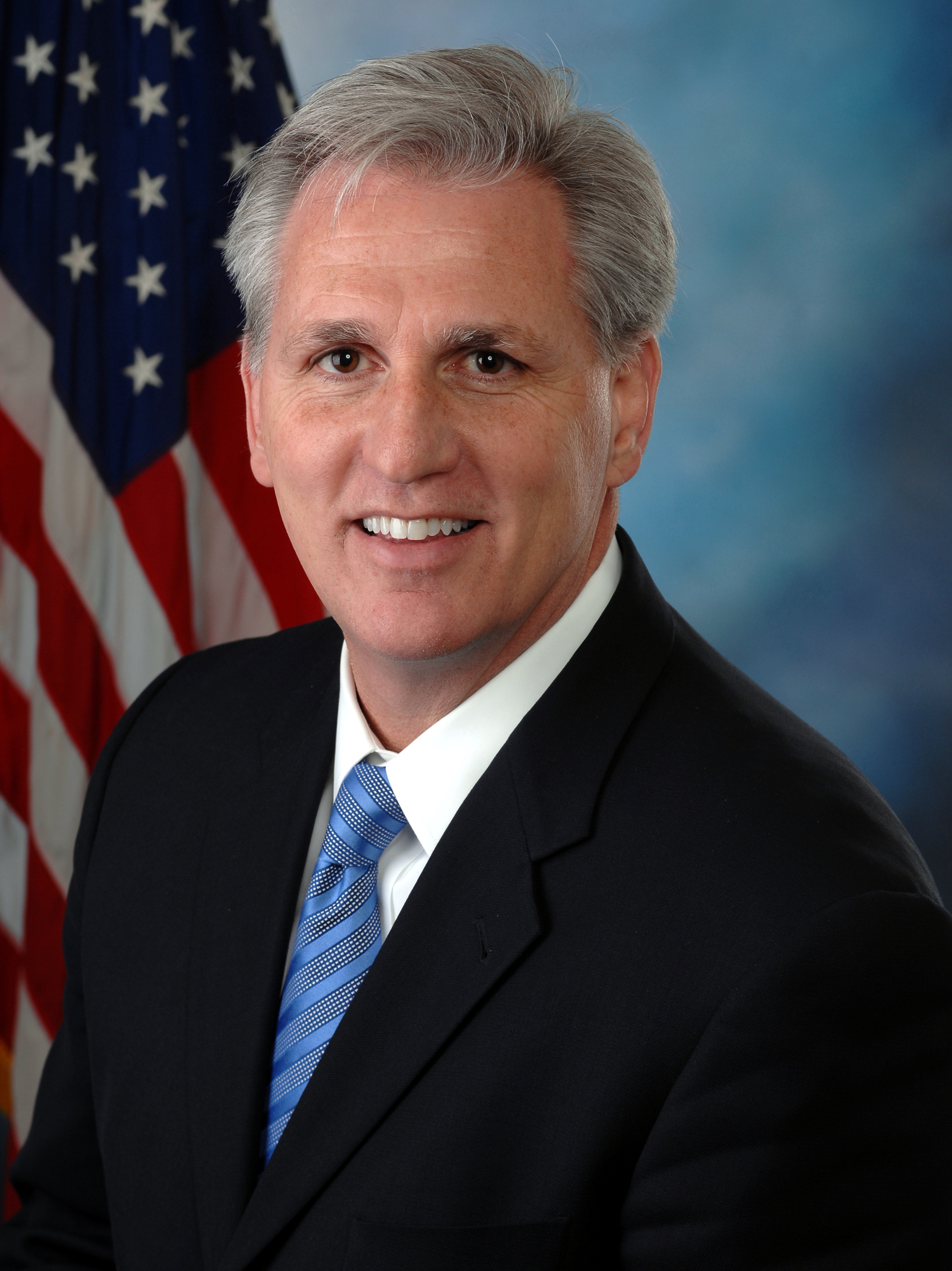

Nominee	Kevin McCarthy	Raul Garcia
Party	Republican	Democratic
Popular vote	100,317	33,726
Percentage	74.8%	25.2%
- County results Carthy: 60–70% 70–80%
U.S. Representative before election
Kevin McCarthy
Republican
Elected U.S. Representative
Kevin McCarthy
Republican

The 23rd district is based in the southern Central Valley and includes parts of Bakersfield. Republican House Majority Whip Kevin McCarthy, who had represented the 23rd district since 2013 and previously represented the 22nd district from 2007 to 2013, ran for re-election.

=== Primary election ===
==== Republican candidates ====
===== Advanced to general =====
- Kevin McCarthy, incumbent U.S. representative

==== Democratic candidates ====
===== Advanced to general =====
- Raul Garcia, farm worker

==== Results ====
Nonpartisan blanket primary results
Party	Candidate	Votes	%
Republican	Kevin McCarthy (incumbent)	58,334	99.1
Democratic	Raul Garcia (write-in)	313	0.5
Republican	Mike Biglay (write-in)	157	0.3
No party preference	Ronald L. Porter (write-in)	36	0.1
Libertarian	Gail K. Lightfoot (write-in)	31	0.1
Green	Noah Calugaru (write-in)	3	0.01
Total votes		58,871	100.0

=== General election ===
==== Predictions ====
Source	Ranking	As of
The Cook Political Report	Safe R	November 3, 2014
Rothenberg	Safe R	October 24, 2014
Sabato's Crystal Ball	Safe R	October 30, 2014
RCP	Safe R	November 2, 2014
Daily Kos Elections	Safe R	November 4, 2014

==== Results ====
California's 23rd congressional district election, 2014
Party	Candidate	Votes	%
Republican	Kevin McCarthy (incumbent)	100,317	74.8
Democratic	Raul Garcia	33,726	25.2
Total votes		134,043	100.0
Republican hold			

== District 24 ==
2014 California's 24th congressional district election
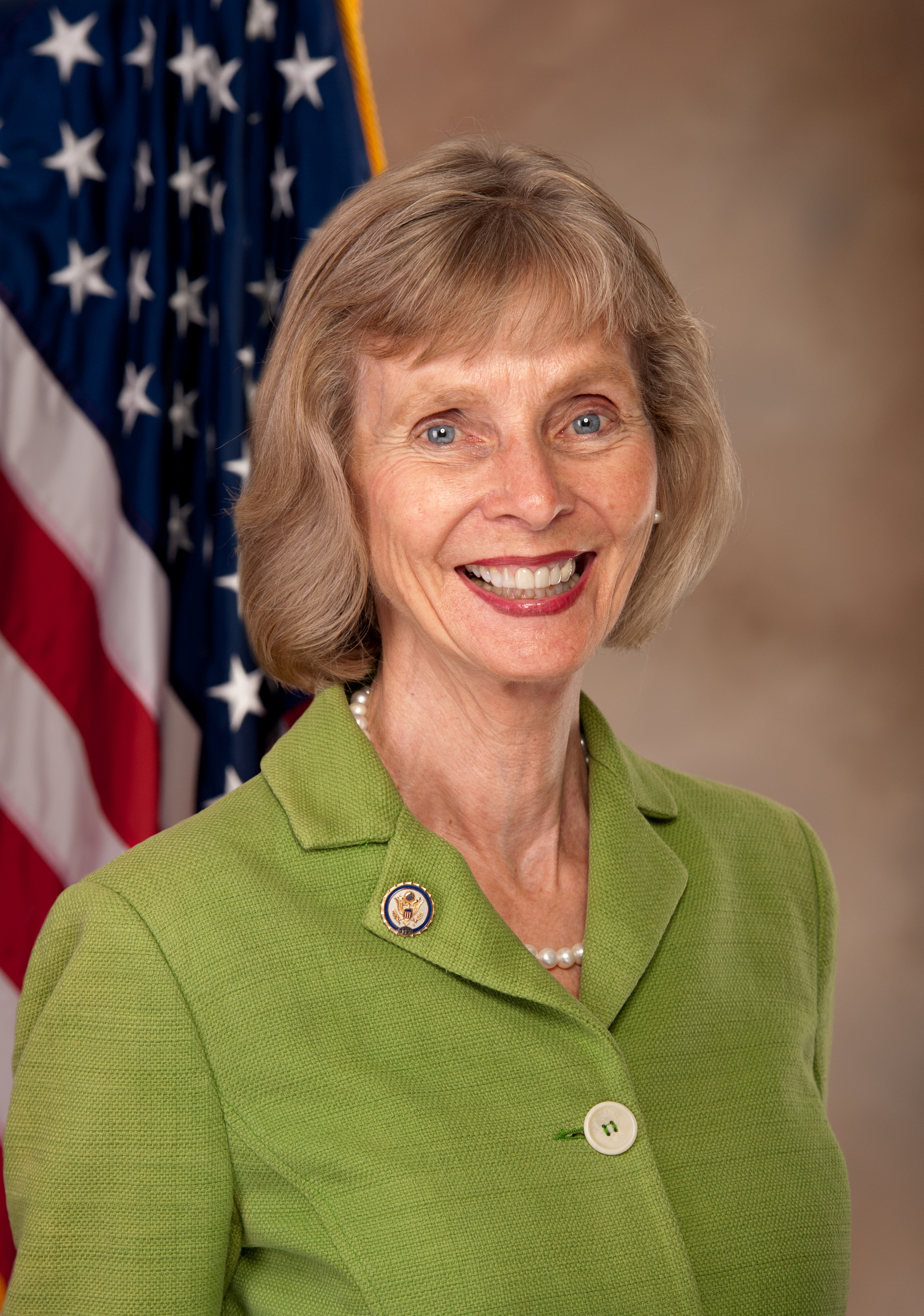

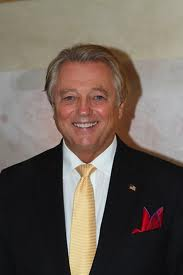
Nominee	Lois Capps	Christopher Mitchum
Party	Democratic	Republican
Popular vote	103,228	95,566
Percentage	51.9%	48.1%
- County results Capps: 50–60% 60–70% Mitchum: 50–60%
U.S. Representative before election
Lois Capps
Democratic
Elected U.S. Representative
Lois Capps
Democratic

The 24th district is based in the Central Coast and includes San Luis Obispo and Santa Barbara. Incumbent Democrat Lois Capps, who had represented the 24th district since 2013 and previously represented the 23rd district from 2003 to 2013 and the 22nd district from 1998 to 2003, ran for re-election.

=== Primary election ===
==== Democratic candidates ====
===== Advanced to general =====
- Lois Capps, incumbent U.S. representative

===== Eliminated in primary =====
- Paul Coyne, businessman and bank manager
- Sandra Marshall, publisher community organizer

==== Republican candidates ====
===== Advanced to general =====
- Christopher Mitchum, former actor, businessman and candidate for this seat in 2012

===== Eliminated in primary =====
- Bradley Allen, pediatric heart surgeon
- Justin Donald Fareed, cattle rancher and businessman
- Dale Francisco, Santa Barbara City Council member
- Alexis Stuart, consultant and author

==== Independent candidates ====
===== Eliminated in primary =====
- Steve Isakson, electronics engineer and businessman

==== Results ====
Nonpartisan blanket primary results
Party	Candidate	Votes	%
Democratic	Lois Capps (incumbent)	58,198	43.7
Republican	Christopher Mitchum	21,059	15.8
Republican	Justin Donald Fareed	20,445	15.3
Republican	Dale Francisco	15,575	11.7
Republican	Bradley Allen	9,269	7.0
Democratic	Sandra Marshall	4,646	3.5
Democratic	Paul H. Coyne Jr.	2,144	1.6
No party preference	Steve Isakson	1,249	0.9
Republican	Alexis Stuart	678	0.5
Total votes		133,263	100.0

=== General election ===
==== Endorsements ====
Lois Capps (D)

Organizations

- Democratic Congressional Campaign Committee "Frontline" Program
Christopher Mitchum (R)

Organizations

- Tea Party Express

==== Predictions ====
Source	Ranking	As of
The Cook Political Report	Likely D	November 3, 2014
Rothenberg	Likely D	October 24, 2014
Sabato's Crystal Ball	Likely D	October 30, 2014
RCP	Likely D	November 2, 2014
Daily Kos Elections	Likely D	November 4, 2014

==== Results ====
California's 24th congressional district election, 2014
Party	Candidate	Votes	%
Democratic	Lois Capps (incumbent)	103,228	51.9
Republican	Christopher Mitchum	95,566	48.1
Total votes		198,794	100.0
Democratic hold			

== District 25 ==
2014 California's 25th congressional district election
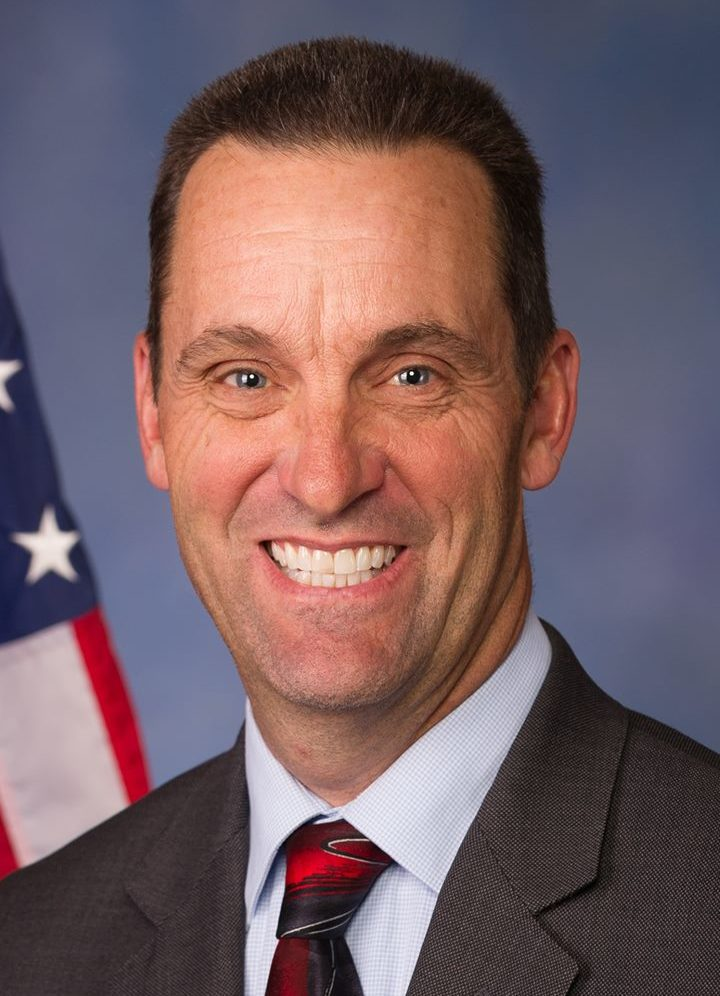

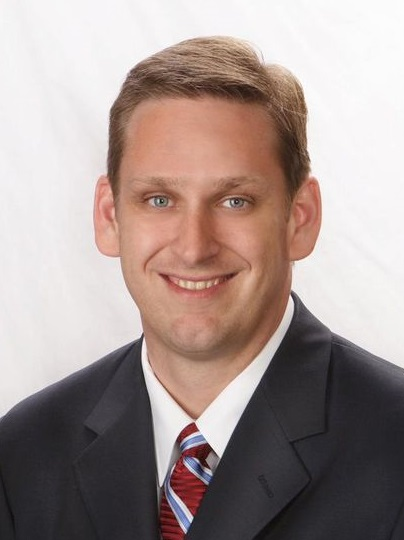
Nominee	Steve Knight	Tony Strickland
Party	Republican	Republican
Popular vote	60,847	53,225
Percentage	53.3%	46.7%
U.S. Representative before election
Howard McKeon
Republican
Elected U.S. Representative
Steve Knight
Republican

The 25th district is based in northern Los Angeles County and includes Palmdale and Santa Clarita. Incumbent Republican Howard McKeon, who had represented the 25th district since 1993, retired.

=== Primary election ===
==== Republican candidates ====
===== Advanced to general =====
- Steve Knight, state senator
- Tony Strickland, former state senator and general election candidate for the 26th District in 2012

===== Declined =====
- Peter Foy, chairman of the Ventura County Board of Supervisors
- Buck McKeon, incumbent U.S. representative
- George Runner, member of the State Board of Equalization and former state senator
- Cameron Smyth, former state assembly member and former mayor of Santa Clarita
- Scott Wilk, state assembly member

==== Democratic candidates ====
===== Eliminated in primary =====
- J. R. Puentes, Army veteran
- Lee Rogers, podiatrist and general election candidate for this seat in 2012
- Evan Thomas, test pilot and retired Air Force officer

==== Endorsements ====
Steve Knight (R)

State officials

- Steve Poizner, former California Insurance Commissioner

State legislators

- Connie Conway, Minority Leader of the California State Assembly
- Jean Fuller, state senator
- Sharon Runner, former state senator
- Cameron Smyth, former state assembly member
- Scott Wilk, state assembly member

Local officials

- Michael D. Antonovich, Los Angeles County supervisor
- Glenn Becerra, Simi Valley city councilman
- Laura Bettencourt, Palmdale city councilwoman
- TimBen Boydston, Santa Clarita city councilman
- Jim Cox, mayor of Victorville
- Marvin Crist, Lancaster city councilman
- Mike Dispenza, Palmdale city councilman
- Curt Emick, mayor of Apple Valley
- Peter Foy, chairman of the Ventura County Board of Supervisors
- Steven Hofbauer, Palmdale city councilman
- Sandra Johnson, Lancaster city councilwoman
- Mike Judge, Simi Valley councilman
- Tom Lackey, mayor pro tem of Palmdale
- Jim Ledford, mayor of Palmdale
- Richard Loa, former Palmdale city councilman
- Ken Mann, Lancaster city councilman
- Keith Mashburn, Simi Valley city councilman
- Ryan McEachron, Victorville city councilman
- George Runner, State Board of Equalization member
- Ed Sileo, former Lancaster city councilman
- Thurston "Smitty" Smith, mayor pro tem of Hesperia
- Steven Sojka, Simi Valley city councilman
- Barb Stanton, Apple Valley town councilwoman
- Andy Visokey, former Lancaster city councilman
- Laurene Weste, Santa Clarita city councilwoman
Lee Rogers (D)

U.S. representatives

- Tony Cardenas, U.S. Representative (CA-29)
- Zoe Lofgren, U.S. Representative (CA-19)
Tony Strickland (R)

U.S. representatives

- Darrell Issa, U.S. representative for California's 49th congressional district
- Buck McKeon, incumbent U.S. representative
- Paul Ryan, Republican candidate for vice president in 2012
- Mac Thornberry, U.S. congressman from Texas

State officials

- Mitt Romney, Republican candidate for president in 2012

State legislators

- Nathan Fletcher, former Democratic California assemblyman

Organizations

- American Conservative Union PAC
- California Republican National Hispanic Assembly
- Humane Society Legislative Fund
- United States Chamber of Commerce
- Young Republicans

Local officials

- Henry Hearns, former mayor of Lancaster
- Bob Huber, mayor of Simi Valley
- Rex Parris, mayor of Lancaster
- Ron Smith, former Los Angeles County deputy sheriff and current Lancaster councilman

Individuals

- John Bolton, former U.S. ambassador to the United Nations
- Tom Del Beccaro, former chairman of the California Republican Party
- Arthur Laffer, economic adviser for President Ronald Reagan

==== Results ====
Nonpartisan blanket primary results
Party	Candidate	Votes	%
Republican	Tony Strickland	19,090	29.6
Republican	Steve Knight	18,327	28.4
Democratic	Lee Rogers	14,315	22.2
Democratic	Evan "Ivan" Thomas	6,149	9.5
Republican	Troy Castagna	3,805	5.9
Libertarian	David Koster Bruce	1,214	1.9
No party preference	Michael Mussack	933	1.4
Republican	Navraj Singh	699	1.1
Total votes		64,532	100.0

=== General election ===
==== Endorsements ====
Steve Knight (R)

State officials

- Steve Poizner, former California Insurance Commissioner

State legislators

- Connie Conway, Minority Leader of the California State Assembly
- Jean Fuller, state senator
- Sharon Runner, former state senator
- Cameron Smyth, former state assembly member
- Scott Wilk, state assembly member

Local officials

- Michael D. Antonovich, Los Angeles County supervisor

Individuals

- Lee Rogers, podiatrist
Tony Strickland (R)

U.S. representatives

- Darrell Issa, U.S. representative for California's 49th congressional district
- Buck McKeon, incumbent U.S. representative
- Paul Ryan, Republican candidate for vice president in 2012
- Mac Thornberry, U.S. congressman from Texas

State officials

- Mitt Romney, Republican candidate for president in 2012

State legislators

- Nathan Fletcher, former Democratic California assemblyman

Organizations

- American Conservative Union
- California Republican National Hispanic Assembly
- Humane Society Legislative Fund
- National Republican Congressional Committee "Contender" Program
- United States Chamber of Commerce
- Young Republicans

==== Predictions ====
Source	Ranking	As of
The Cook Political Report	Safe R	November 3, 2014
Rothenberg	Safe R	October 24, 2014
Sabato's Crystal Ball	Safe R	October 30, 2014
RCP	Safe R	November 2, 2014
Daily Kos Elections	Safe R	November 4, 2014

==== Results ====
California's 25th congressional district election, 2014
Party	Candidate	Votes	%
Republican	Steve Knight	60,847	53.3
Republican	Tony Strickland	53,225	46.7
Total votes		114,072	100.0
Republican hold			

== District 26 ==
2014 California's 26th congressional district election
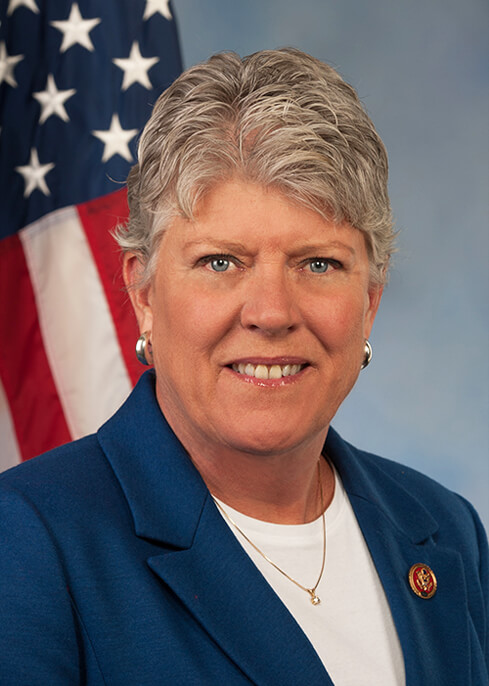

Nominee	Julia Brownley	Jeff Gorell
Party	Democratic	Republican
Popular vote	87,176	82,653
Percentage	51.3%	48.7%
- County results Brownley: 50–60% Gorell: 50–60%
U.S. Representative before election
Julia Brownley
Democratic
Elected U.S. Representative
Julia Brownley
Democratic

The 26th district is based in the southern Central Coast and includes Oxnard and Thousand Oaks. Incumbent Democrat Julia Brownley, who had represented the 26th district since 2013, ran for re-election.

=== Primary election ===
Former state senator Tony Strickland, who lost to Brownley in 2012, announced that he would challenge Brownley again, before switching to run in the open 25th instead.

==== Democratic candidates ====
===== Advanced to general =====
- Julia Brownley, incumbent U.S. representative

==== Republican candidates ====
===== Advanced to general =====
- Jeff Gorell, state assembly member

===== Eliminated in primary =====
- Rafael Alberto Dagnesses, business owner and entrepreneur

===== Withdrawn =====
- Tony Strickland, former state senator and general election candidate for this seat in 2012

===== Declined =====
- Jeff Suppan, MLB pitcher

==== Independent candidates ====
===== Eliminated in primary =====
- Douglas Kmiec, professor, author and diplomat

==== Results ====
Nonpartisan blanket primary results
Party	Candidate	Votes	%
Democratic	Julia Brownley (incumbent)	38,854	45.5
Republican	Jeff Gorell	38,021	44.5
Republican	Rafael Alberto Dagnesses	6,536	7.7
No party preference	Douglas Kmiec	1,980	2.3
Total votes		85,391	100.0

=== General election ===
==== Endorsements ====
Julia Brownley (D)

Organizations

- Democratic Congressional Campaign Committee "Frontline" Program
- EMILY's List
Jeff Gorell (R)

Organizations

- BIPAC
- National Republican Congressional Committee "Young Guns" Program

==== Predictions ====
Source	Ranking	As of
The Cook Political Report	Tossup	November 3, 2014
Rothenberg	Lean D	October 24, 2014
Sabato's Crystal Ball	Lean D	October 30, 2014
RCP	Tossup	November 2, 2014
Daily Kos Elections	Tossup	November 4, 2014

==== Results ====
California's 26th congressional district election, 2014
Party	Candidate	Votes	%
Democratic	Julia Brownley (incumbent)	87,176	51.3
Republican	Jeff Gorell	82,653	48.7
Total votes		169,829	100.0
Democratic hold			

== District 27 ==
2014 California's 27th congressional district election
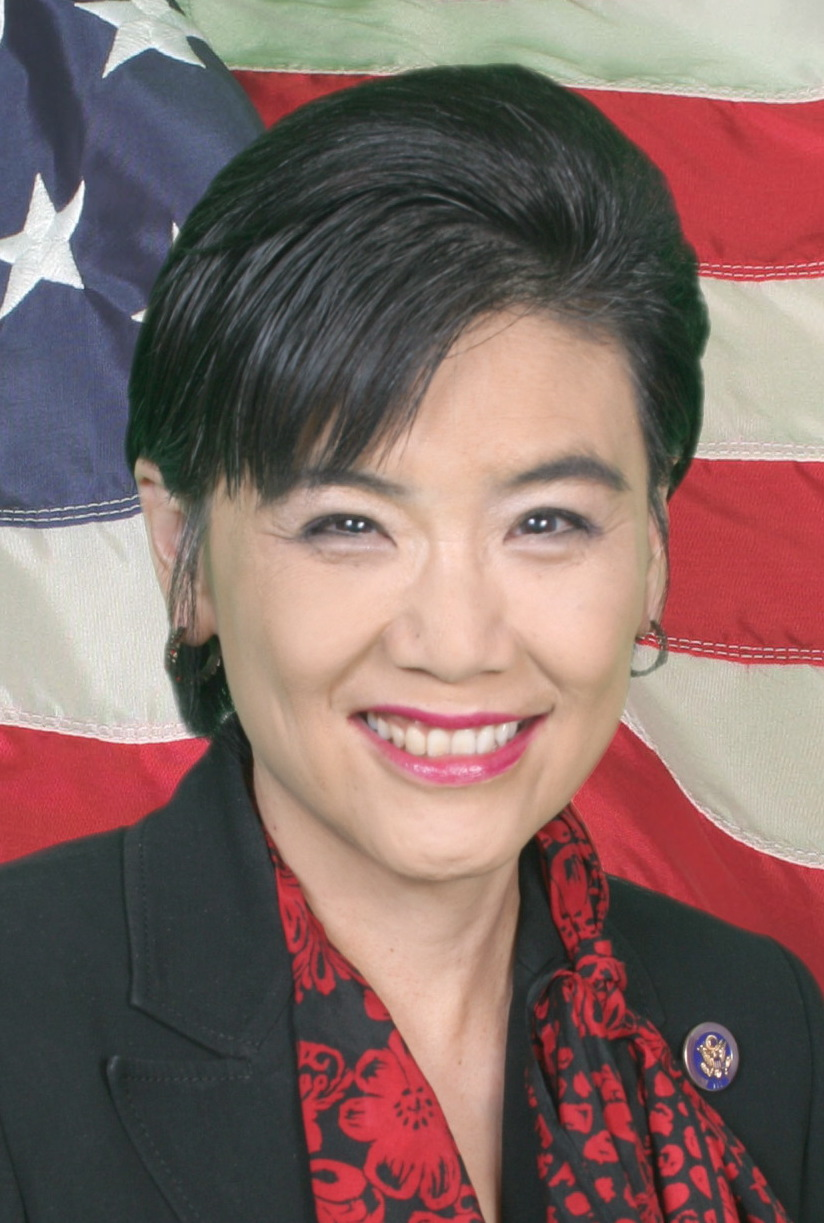

Nominee	Judy Chu	Jack Orswell
Party	Democratic	Republican
Popular vote	75,728	51,852
Percentage	59.4%	40.6%
- County results Chu: 60–70% Orswell: 60–70%
U.S. Representative before election
Judy Chu
Democratic
Elected U.S. Representative
Judy Chu
Democratic

The 27th district is based in the San Gabriel Foothills and includes Alhambra and Pasadena. Incumbent Democrat Judy Chu, who had represented the 27th district since 2013, and previously represented the 32nd district from 2009 to 2013, ran for re-election.

=== Primary election ===
==== Democratic candidates ====
===== Advanced to general =====
- Judy Chu, incumbent U.S. representative

==== Republican candidates ====
===== Advanced to general =====
- Jack Orswell, small business owner

==== Results ====
Nonpartisan blanket primary results
Party	Candidate	Votes	%
Democratic	Judy Chu (incumbent)	39,915	60.4
Republican	Jack Orswell	26,205	39.6
Total votes		66,120	100.0

=== General election ===
==== Predictions ====
Source	Ranking	As of
The Cook Political Report	Safe D	November 3, 2014
Rothenberg	Safe D	October 24, 2014
Sabato's Crystal Ball	Safe D	October 30, 2014
RCP	Safe D	November 2, 2014
Daily Kos Elections	Safe D	November 4, 2014

==== Results ====
California's 27th congressional district election, 2014
Party	Candidate	Votes	%
Democratic	Judy Chu (incumbent)	75,728	59.4
Republican	Jack Orswell	51,852	40.6
Total votes		127,580	100.0
Democratic hold			

== District 28 ==
2014 California's 28th congressional district election
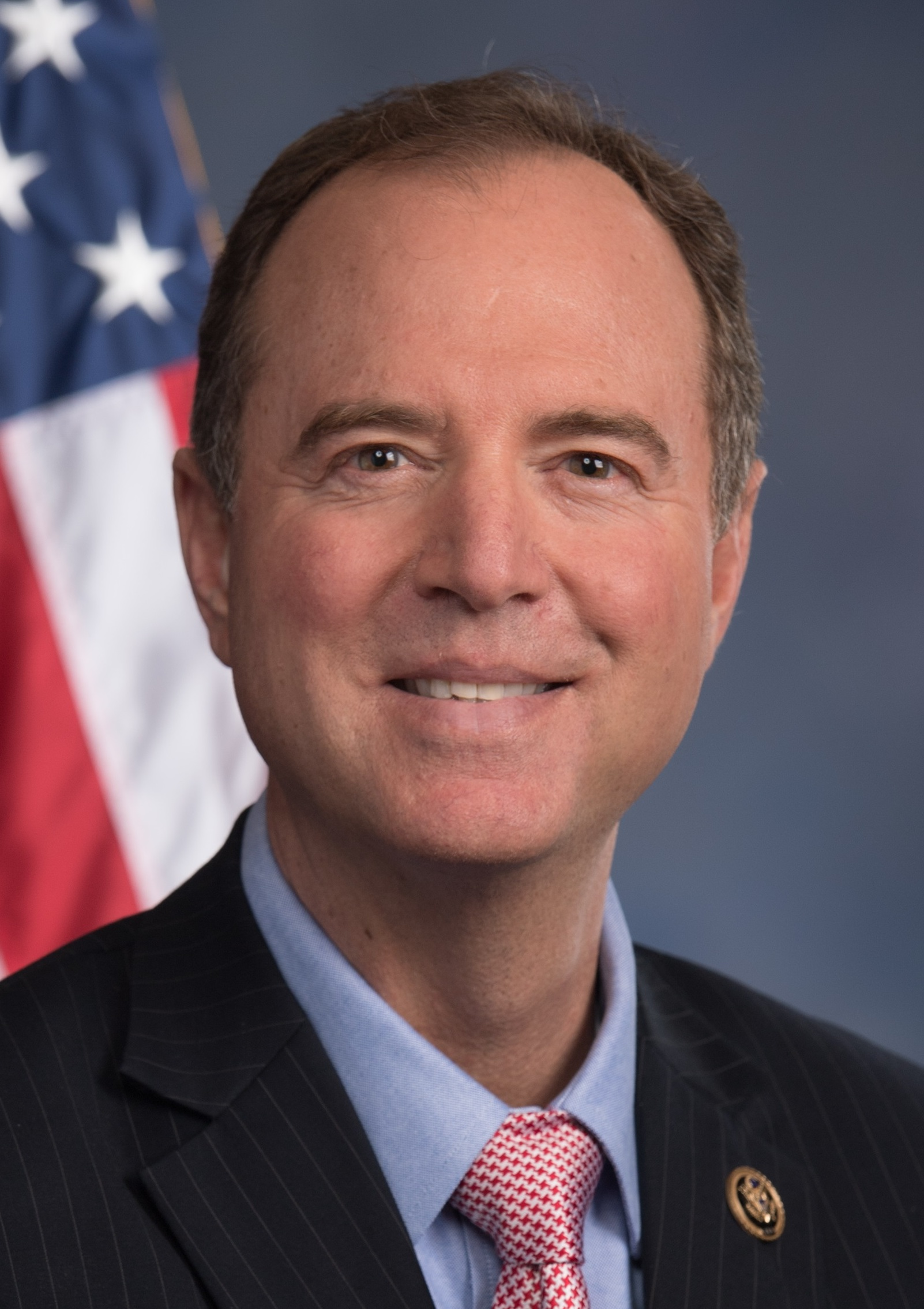

Nominee	Adam Schiff	Steve Stokes
Party	Democratic	No party preference
Popular vote	91,996	28,268
Percentage	76.5%	23.5%
- County results Schiff: 70–80%
U.S. Representative before election
Adam Schiff
Democratic
Elected U.S. Representative
Adam Schiff
Democratic

The 28th district is based in the northern Los Angeles suburbs and includes Burbank and Glendale as well as parts of central Los Angeles. Incumbent Democrat Adam Schiff, who had represented the 28th district since 2013 and previously represented the 29th district from 2003 to 2013 and the 27th district from 2001 to 2003, ran for re-election.

=== Primary election ===
==== Democratic candidates ====
===== Advanced to general =====
- Adam Schiff, incumbent U.S. representative

===== Eliminated in primary =====
- Sal Genovese, community services director and candidate for this seat in 2012

==== Republican candidates ====
===== Eliminated in primary =====
- Sam Yousuf

==== Independent candidates ====
===== Advanced to general =====
- Steve Stokes, real estate broker

==== Results ====
Nonpartisan blanket primary results
Party	Candidate	Votes	%
Democratic	Adam Schiff (incumbent)	46,004	74.5
No party preference	Steve Stokes	11,078	17.9
Democratic	Sal Genovese	4,643	7.5
Republican	Sam Yousuf (write-in)	38	0.1
Total votes		61,763	100.0

=== General election ===
==== Predictions ====
Source	Ranking	As of
The Cook Political Report	Safe D	November 3, 2014
Rothenberg	Safe D	October 24, 2014
Sabato's Crystal Ball	Safe D	October 30, 2014
RCP	Safe D	November 2, 2014
Daily Kos Elections	Safe D	November 4, 2014

==== Results ====
California's 28th congressional district election, 2014
Party	Candidate	Votes	%
Democratic	Adam Schiff (incumbent)	91,996	76.5
No party preference	Steve Stokes	28,268	23.5
Total votes		120,264	100.0
Democratic hold			

== District 29 ==
2014 California's 29th congressional district election
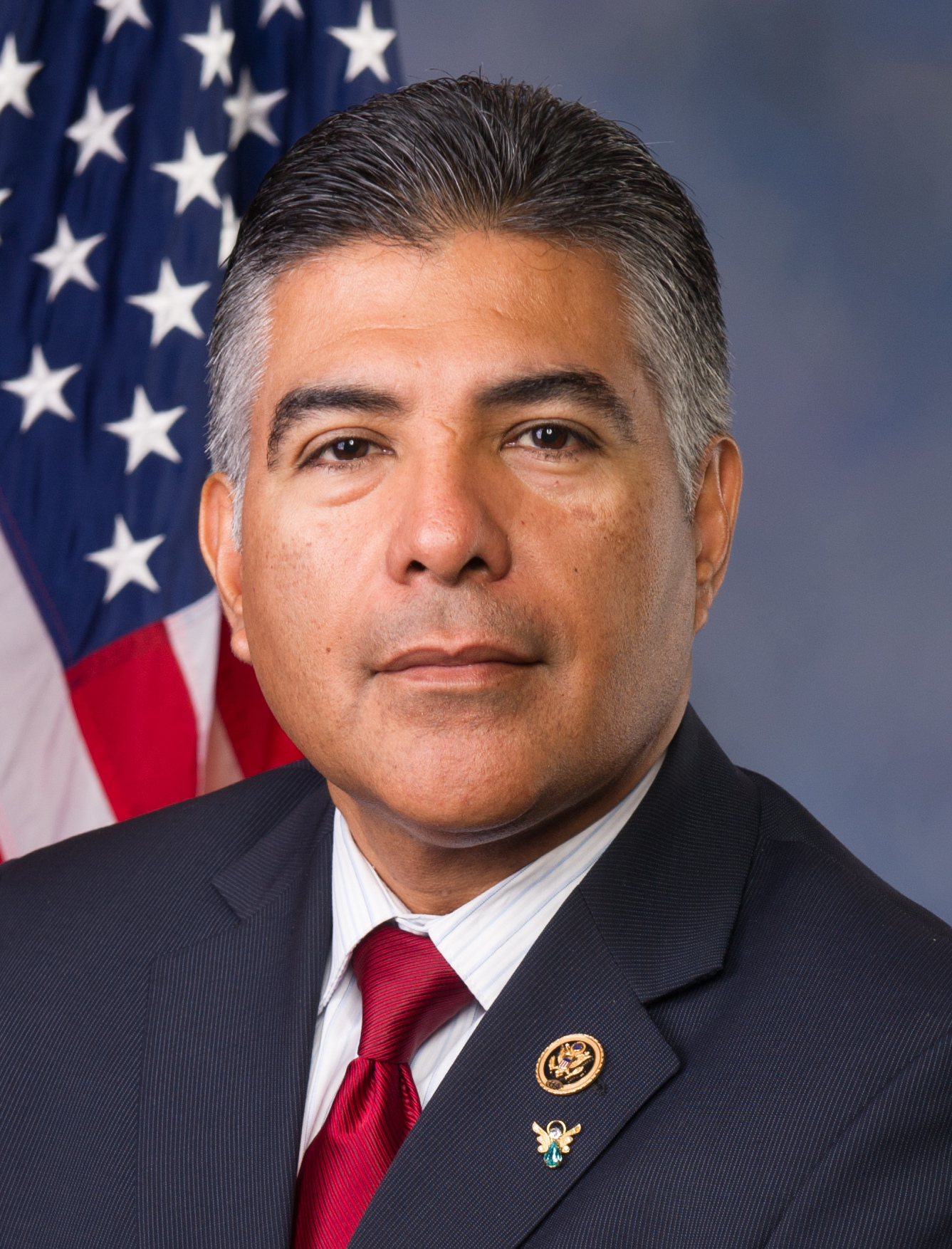

Nominee	Tony Cardenas	William O'Callaghan Leader
Party	Democratic	Republican
Popular vote	50,096	17,045
Percentage	74.6%	25.6%
- County results Cardenas: 70–80%
U.S. Representative before election
Tony Cardenas
Democratic
Elected U.S. Representative
Tony Cardenas
Democratic

The 29th district is based in the northeastern San Fernando Valley. Incumbent Democrat Tony Cardenas, who had represented the 29th district since 2013, ran for re-election.

=== Primary election ===
==== Democratic candidates ====
===== Advanced to general =====
- Tony Cardenas, incumbent U.S. representative

===== Eliminated in primary =====
- Venice Gamble, consumer advocate paralegal

==== Republican candidates ====
===== Advanced to general =====
- William O'Callaghan Leader, small businessman

==== Results ====
Nonpartisan blanket primary results
Party	Candidate	Votes	%
Democratic	Tony Cardenas (incumbent)	19,566	62.8
Republican	William O'Callaghan Leader	8,025	25.8
Democratic	Venice J. Gamble	3,502	11.4
Total votes		31,093	100.0

=== General election ===
==== Endorsements ====
Tony Cardenas (D)

Organizations

- No Labels

==== Predictions ====
Source	Ranking	As of
The Cook Political Report	Safe D	November 3, 2014
Rothenberg	Safe D	October 24, 2014
Sabato's Crystal Ball	Safe D	October 30, 2014
RCP	Safe D	November 2, 2014
Daily Kos Elections	Safe D	November 4, 2014

==== Results ====
California's 29th congressional district election, 2014
Party	Candidate	Votes	%
Democratic	Tony Cardenas (incumbent)	50,096	74.6
Republican	William O'Callaghan Leader	17,045	25.6
Total votes		67,141	100.0
Democratic hold			

== District 30 ==
2014 California's 30th congressional district election
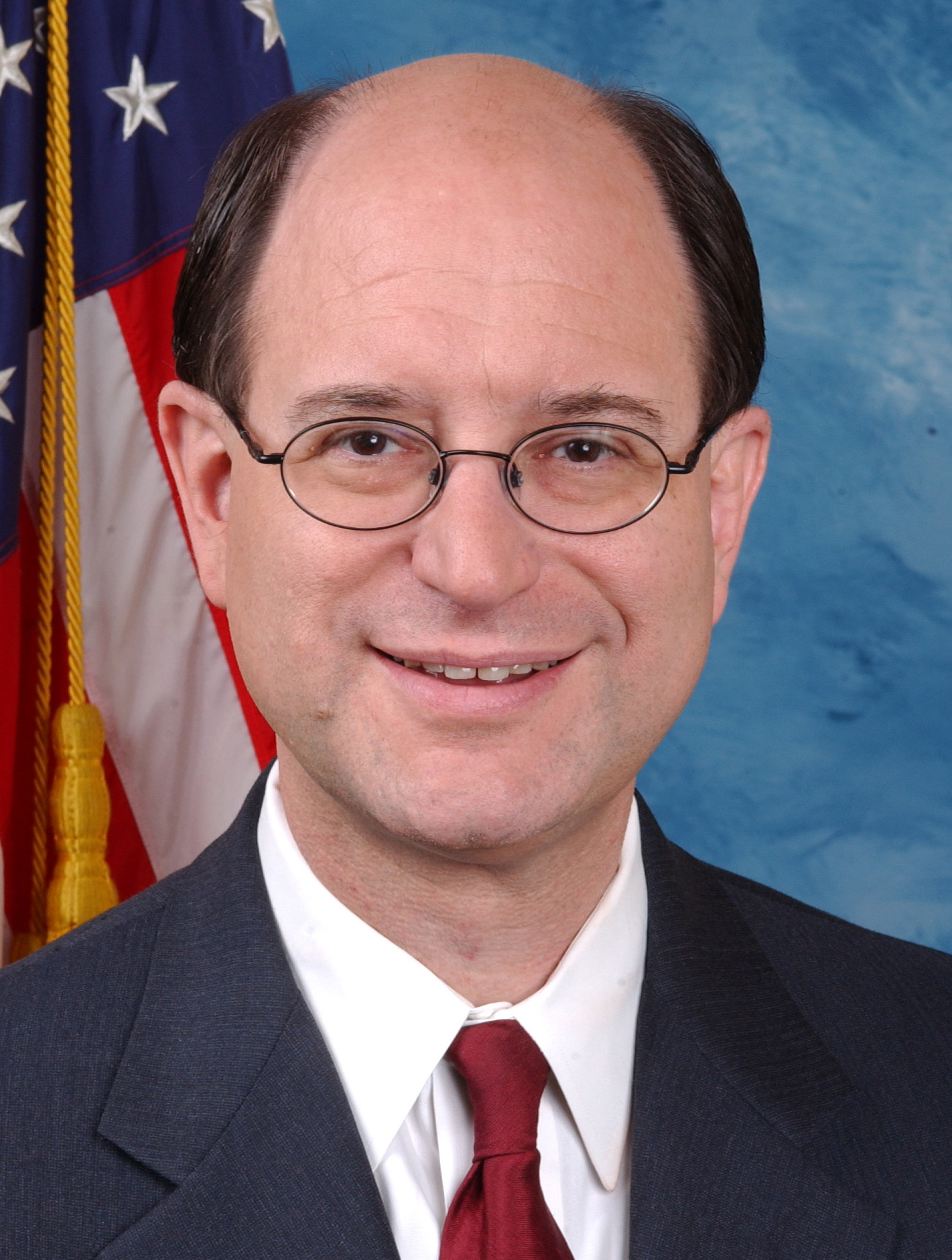

Nominee	Brad Sherman	Mark S. Reed
Party	Democratic	Republican
Popular vote	86,568	45,315
Percentage	65.6%	34.4%
- County results Sherman: 60–70% Reed: 50–60%
U.S. Representative before election
Brad Sherman
Democratic
Elected U.S. Representative
Brad Sherman
Democratic

The 30th district is based in the western San Fernando Valley and includes Sherman Oaks. Incumbent Democrat Brad Sherman, who had represented the 30th district since 2013 and previously represented the 27th district from 2003 to 2013 and the 24th district from 1997 to 2003, ran for re-election.

=== Primary election ===
==== Democratic candidates ====
===== Advanced to general =====
- Brad Sherman, incumbent U.S. representative

===== Eliminated in primary =====
- Marc Litchman, nonprofit executive director

==== Republican candidates ====
===== Advanced to general =====
- Mark Reed, television journalist and businessman

===== Eliminated in primary =====
- Pablo Kleinman, businessman

==== Green candidates ====
===== Eliminated in primary =====
- Mike Powelson, professor, activist and candidate for this seat in 2012

==== Results ====
Nonpartisan blanket primary results
Party	Candidate	Votes	%
Democratic	Brad Sherman (incumbent)	40,787	57.9
Republican	Mark S. Reed	14,129	20.1
Republican	Pablo Kleinman	8,808	12.5
Democratic	Marc Litchman	4,251	6.0
Green	Michael W. Powelson	2,352	3.3
No party preference	A. Rab (write-in)	76	0.1
Democratic	Karl Siganporia (write-in)	0	0.0
Total votes		70,403	100.0

=== General election ===
==== Predictions ====
Source	Ranking	As of
The Cook Political Report	Safe D	November 3, 2014
Rothenberg	Safe D	October 24, 2014
Sabato's Crystal Ball	Safe D	October 30, 2014
RCP	Safe D	November 2, 2014
Daily Kos Elections	Safe D	November 4, 2014

==== Results ====
California's 30th congressional district election, 2014
Party	Candidate	Votes	%
Democratic	Brad Sherman (incumbent)	86,568	65.6
Republican	Mark S. Reed	45,315	34.4
Total votes		131,883	100.0
Democratic hold			

== District 31 ==
2014 California's 31st congressional district election
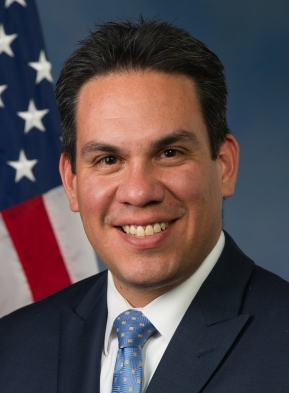

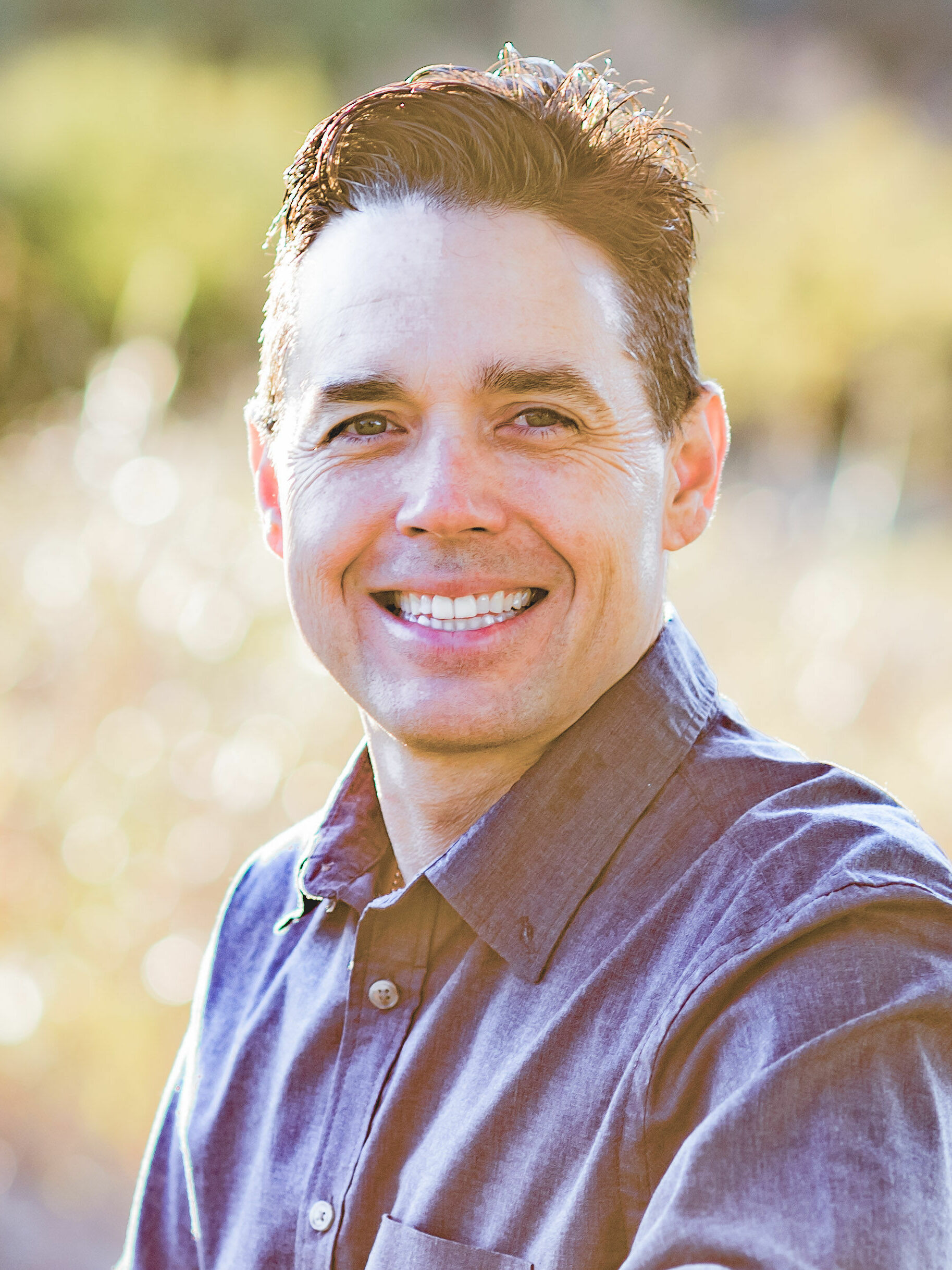
Nominee	Pete Aguilar	Paul Chabot
Party	Democratic	Republican
Popular vote	51,622	48,162
Percentage	51.7%	48.3%
- County results Aguilar: 50–60%
U.S. Representative before election
Gary Miller
Republican
Elected U.S. Representative
Pete Aguilar
Democratic

The 31st district is based in the Inland Empire and includes San Bernardino and Rancho Cucamonga. Incumbent Republican Gary Miller, who had represented the 31st district since 2013 and previously represented the 42nd district from 2003 to 2013 and the 41st district from 1999 to 2003, retired.

=== Primary election ===
==== Republican candidates ====
===== Eliminated in primary =====
- Ryan Downing, political consultant and businessman
- Lesli Gooch, senior policy director for Congressman Gary Miller

===== Withdrawn =====
- John Valdivia, San Bernardino councilman

===== Declined =====
- Bob Dutton, former state senator and general election candidate for this seat in 2012
- Curt Hagman, state assembly member
- Gary Miller, incumbent U.S. representative
- Mike Morrell, state assembly member
- James Ramos, San Bernardino County supervisor
- Michael A. Ramos, San Bernardino County district attorney
- Janice Rutherford, San Bernardino County supervisor
- Marc Steinorth, Rancho Cucamonga city councilman
- Acquanetta Warren, mayor of Fontana

==== Democratic candidates ====
===== Advanced to general =====
- Pete Aguilar, mayor of Redlands and candidate for this seat in 2012

===== Eliminated in primary =====
- Joe Baca, former U.S. representative
- Eloise Reyes, attorney
- Danny Tillman, San Bernardino School Board member

===== Declined =====
- Josie Gonzales, San Bernardino County supervisor

==== Endorsements ====
Pete Aguilar (D)

U.S. senators

- Dianne Feinstein, U.S. senator

U.S. representatives

- Karen Bass, U.S. representative (CA-37)
- Julia Brownley, U.S. representative (CA-26)
- Judy Chu, U.S. representative (CA-27)
- Janice Hahn, U.S. representative (CA-44)
- Zoe Lofgren, U.S. representative (CA-19)
- Alan Lowenthal, U.S. representative (CA-47)
- Gloria Negrete McLeod, U.S. representative (CA-35)
- Scott Peters, U.S. representative (CA-52)
- Loretta Sanchez, U.S. representative (CA-46)
- Adam Schiff, U.S. representative (CA-28)
- Eric Swalwell, U.S. representative (CA-15)
- Mark Takano, U.S. representative (CA-41)
- Henry Waxman, U.S. representative (CA-33)

State officials

- Gavin Newsom, lieutenant governor of California

Organizations

- Democratic Congressional Campaign Committee
Joe Baca (D)

U.S. representatives

- Sanford Bishop, U.S. representative (GA-2)
- Tim Bishop, U.S. representative (NY-1)
- Bruce Braley, U.S. representative (IA-1)
- G. K. Butterfield, U.S. representative (NC-1)
- Michael Capuano, U.S. representative (NE-2)
- Tony Cárdenas, U.S. representative (CA-29)
- André Carson, U.S. representative (IN-7)
- William Lacy Clay, U.S. representative (MO-1)
- Steve Cohen, U.S. representative (TN-9)
- Michael Doyle, U.S. representative (PA-14)
- Joe Garcia, U.S. representative (FL-26)
- Gene Green, U.S. representative (TX-29)
- Ron Kind, U.S. representative (WI-3)
- Rick Larsen, U.S. representative (WA-2)
- Dave Loebsack, U.S. representative (IA-1)
- Ed Pastor, U.S. representative (AZ-7)
- Ed Perlmutter, U.S. representative (CO-7)
- Jared Polis, U.S. representative (CO-2)
- Nick Rahall, U.S. representative (WV-3)
- Silvestre Reyes, former U.S. representative (TX-16)
- Cedric Richmond, U.S. representative (LA-2)
- Bobby Rush, U.S. representative (IL-1)
- Tim Ryan, U.S. representative (OH-13)
- Kurt Schrader, U.S. representative (OR-5)
- Jose E. Serrano, U.S. representative (NY-15)
- Albio Sires, U.S. representative (NJ-8)
- John Yarmuth, U.S. representative (KY-3)
Paul Chabot (R)

U.S. representatives

- Jerry Lewis, former U.S. representative

State legislators

- Bob Dutton, former state senator and candidate for the seat in 2012
Lesli Gooch (R)

U.S. representatives

- Gary Miller, incumbent U.S. representative

Local officials

- Gary Ovitt, San Bernardino County supervisor
- Acquanetta Warren, mayor of Fontana
Eloise Reyes (D)

Executive branch officials

- Hilda Solis, former Secretary of Labor, former U.S. representative (CA-32)

U.S. representatives

- Xavier Becerra, U.S. representative (CA-34) and Chairman of the House Democratic Caucus
- Grace Napolitano, U.S. representative (CA-32)
- Lucille Roybal-Allard, U.S. representative (CA-40)
- Jackie Speier, U.S. representative (CA-14)

Organizations

- Blue America
- EMILY's List

==== Polling ====
Poll source	Date(s) administered	Sample size	Margin of error	Pete Aguilar (D)	Joe Baca (D)	Paul Chabot (R)	Ryan Downing (R)	Lesli Gooch (R)	Eloise Gomez Reyes (D)	Danny Tillman (D)	Undecided
Tulchin Research (D-DCCC)	May 7–8, 201	400	± 4.9%	15%	13%	23%	7%	6%	13%	6%	18%
Tulchin Research (D-DCCC)	April 14–17, 2014	600	± 4.0%	15%	8%	21%	4%	4%	12%	6%	30%

==== Results ====
Nonpartisan blanket primary results
Party	Candidate	Votes	%
Republican	Paul Chabot	14,163	26.6
Democratic	Pete Aguilar	9,242	17.4
Republican	Lesli Gooch	9,033	17.0
Democratic	Eloise Reyes	8,461	15.9
Democratic	Joe Baca	5,954	11.2
Democratic	Danny Tillman	4,659	8.7
Republican	Ryan Downing	1,737	3.3
Total votes		53,249	100.0

=== General election ===
==== Endorsements ====
Paul Chabot (R)

U.S. representatives

- Jerry Lewis, former U.S. representative

State legislators

- Bob Dutton, former state senator and candidate for the seat in 2012

Organizations

- National Republican Congressional Committee "On the Radar" Program
Pete Aguilar (D)

U.S. senators

- Dianne Feinstein, U.S. senator

U.S. representatives

- Karen Bass, U.S. representative (CA-37)
- Julia Brownley, U.S. representative (CA-26)
- Judy Chu, U.S. representative (CA-27)
- Janice Hahn, U.S. representative (CA-44)
- Zoe Lofgren, U.S. representative (CA-19)
- Alan Lowenthal, U.S. representative (CA-47)
- Gloria Negrete McLeod, U.S. representative (CA-35)
- Scott Peters, U.S. representative (CA-52)
- Loretta Sanchez, U.S. representative (CA-46)
- Adam Schiff, U.S. representative (CA-28)
- Eric Swalwell, U.S. representative (CA-15)
- Mark Takano, U.S. representative (CA-41)
- Henry Waxman, U.S. representative (CA-33)

State officials

- Gavin Newsom, lieutenant governor of California

Organizations

- Democratic Congressional Campaign Committee "Red to Blue" Program
- People for the American Way

==== Polling ====
Poll source	Date(s) administered	Sample size	Margin of error	Paul Chabot (R)	Pete Aguilar (D)	Undecided
American Viewpoint (R-American Future Fund)	October 19–21, 2014	400	± 4.9%	38%	42%	20%

==== Predictions ====
Source	Ranking	As of
The Cook Political Report	Lean D (flip)	November 3, 2014
Rothenberg	Lean D (flip)	October 24, 2014
Sabato's Crystal Ball	Lean D (flip)	October 30, 2014
RCP	Lean D (flip)	November 2, 2014
Daily Kos Elections	Lean D (flip)	November 4, 2014

==== Results ====
California's 31st congressional district election, 2014
Party	Candidate	Votes	%
Democratic	Pete Aguilar	51,622	51.7
Republican	Paul Chabot	48,162	48.3
Total votes		99,784	100.0
Democratic gain from Republican			

== District 32 ==
2014 California's 32nd congressional district election
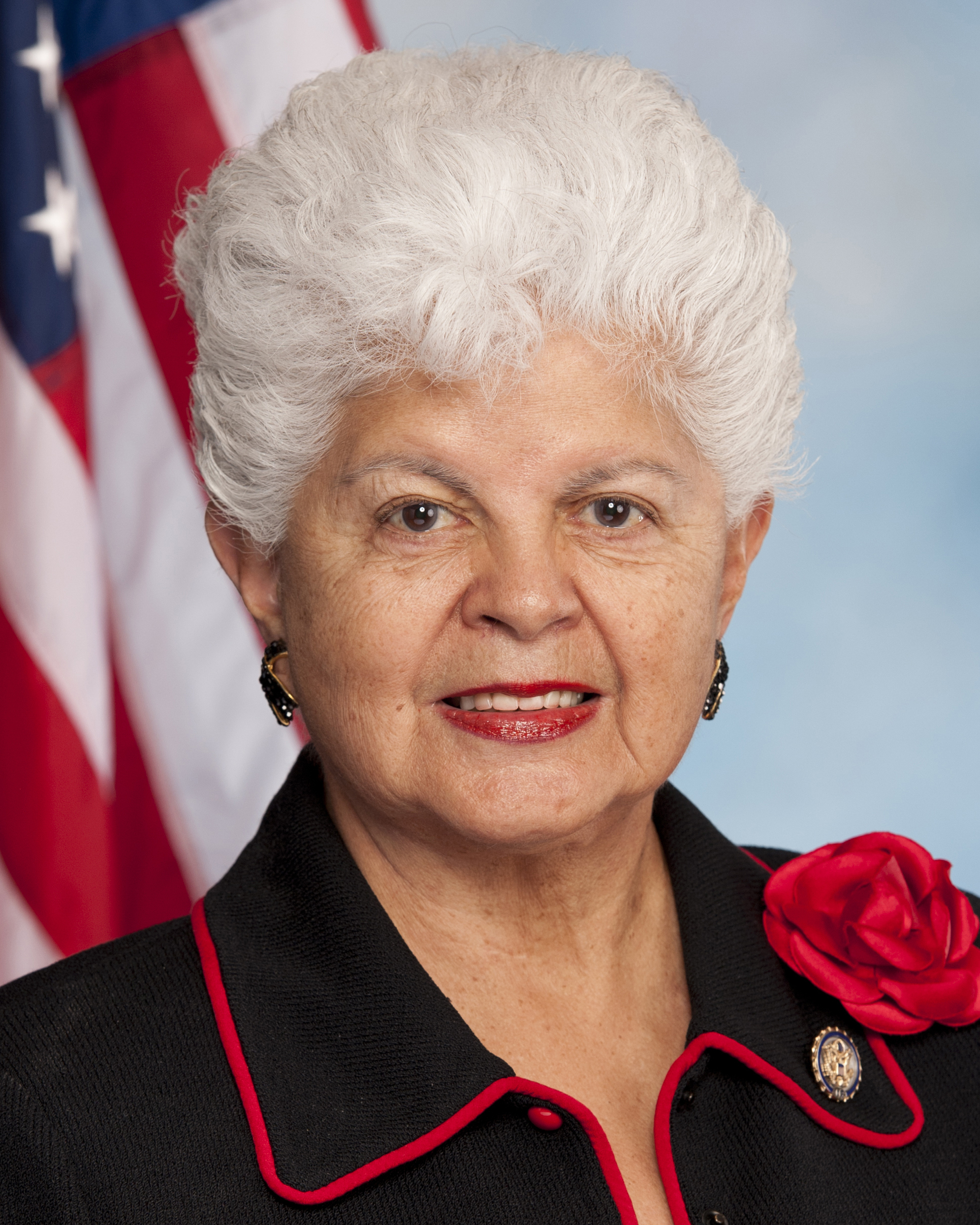

Nominee	Grace Napolitano	Arturo Enrique Alas
Party	Democratic	Republican
Popular vote	50,353	34,053
Percentage	59.7%	40.3%
- County results Napolitano: 50–60%
U.S. Representative before election
Grace Napolitano
Democratic
Elected U.S. Representative
Grace Napolitano
Democratic

The 32nd district is based in the San Gabriel Valley and includes El Monte and West Covina. Incumbent Democrat Grace Napolitano, who had represented the 32nd district since 2013 and previously represented the 38th district from 2003 to 2013 and the 34th district from 1999 to 2003, ran for re-election.

=== Primary election ===
==== Democratic candidates ====
===== Advanced to general =====
- Grace Napolitano, incumbent U.S. representative

==== Republican candidates ====
===== Advanced to general =====
- Arturo Alas, realtor

==== Results ====
Nonpartisan blanket primary results
Party	Candidate	Votes	%
Democratic	Grace Napolitano (incumbent)	24,639	60.0
Republican	Arturo Enrique Alas	16,459	40.0
Total votes		41,098	100.0

=== General election ===
==== Endorsements ====
Arturo Alas (R)

Organizations

- Republican Liberty Caucus

==== Predictions ====
Source	Ranking	As of
The Cook Political Report	Safe D	November 3, 2014
Rothenberg	Safe D	October 24, 2014
Sabato's Crystal Ball	Safe D	October 30, 2014
RCP	Safe D	November 2, 2014
Daily Kos Elections	Safe D	November 4, 2014

==== Results ====
California's 32nd congressional district election, 2014
Party	Candidate	Votes	%
Democratic	Grace Napolitano (incumbent)	50,353	59.7
Republican	Arturo Enrique Alas	34,053	40.3
Total votes		84,406	100.0
Democratic hold			

== District 33 ==
2014 California's 33rd congressional district election
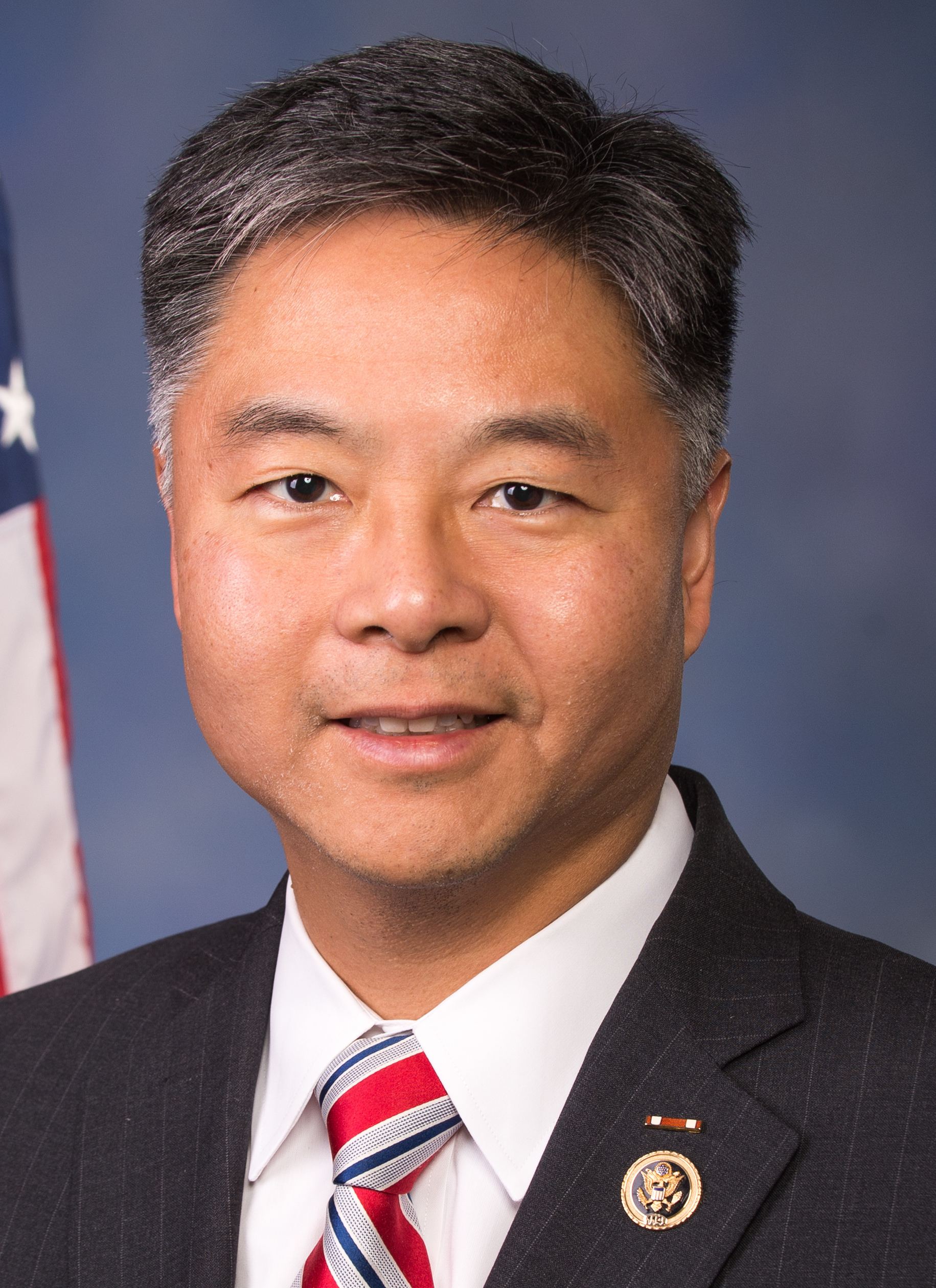

Nominee	Ted Lieu	Elan Carr
Party	Democratic	Republican
Popular vote	108,331	74,700
Percentage	59.2%	40.8%
- County results Lieu: 50–60%
U.S. Representative before election
Henry Waxman
Democratic
Elected U.S. Representative
Ted Lieu
Democratic

The 33rd district is based in coastal Los Angeles County and includes Beverly Hills and Santa Monica. Incumbent Democrat Henry Waxman, who had represented the 33rd district since 2013 and previously represented the 30th district from 2003 to 2013, the 29th district from 1993 to 2003, and the 24th district from 1975 to 1993, retired.

=== Primary election ===
==== Democratic candidates ====
===== Advanced to general =====
- Ted Lieu, state senator

===== Eliminated in primary =====
- Vincent Flaherty, producer, entrepreneur and historian
- Wendy Greuel, former Los Angeles City Controller and candidate for mayor of Los Angeles in 2013
- Kristie Holmes, social worker and professor
- David Kanuth, defense counsel and entrepreneur
- Matt Miller, columnist, radio host, journalist, senior fellow at the Center for American Progress, host of Left, Right & Center and former advisor to the Office of Management and Budget
- Barbara Mulvaney, human rights attorney
- Zein Obagi Jr., educational equality advocate
- Michael Shapiro, sports executive and filmmaker

===== Withdrawn =====
- Derrick Ferree
- James Graf, businessman and entrepreneur
- Karl Siganporia

===== Declined =====
- Howard Berman, former U.S. representative
- Richard Bloom, state assembly member and former mayor of Santa Monica
- Bob Blumenfield, Los Angeles City Council member and former state assembly member
- Debra Bowen, Secretary of State of California and candidate for 36th District in 2011
- William W. Brien, Beverly Hills Council member and former mayor of Beverly Hills
- Julia Brownley, U.S. representative (running for re-election in the 26th district)
- Betsy Butler, former state assembly member
- Sandra Fluke, attorney and women's rights activist (running for state senate)
- Paul Koretz, Los Angeles City Councilman and former state assembly member
- Sheila Kuehl, former state senator (running for Los Angeles County Board of Supervisors)
- Fran Pavley, state senator
- Bobby Shriver, former Santa Monica City Council member (running for Los Angeles County Board of Supervisors)
- Maria Shriver, journalist, author and former First Lady of California
- Richard Simmons, fitness personality and actor
- Antonio Villaraigosa, former mayor of Los Angeles
- Henry Waxman, incumbent U.S. representative
- Zev Yaroslavsky, Los Angeles County supervisor

==== Republican candidates ====
===== Advanced to general =====
- Elan Carr, Los Angeles County deputy district attorney and Supreme Master of Alpha Epsilon Pi

===== Eliminated in primary =====
- Lily Gilani, lawyer
- Kevin Mottus, environmental health advocate

===== Withdrawn =====
- Patrick Kilpatrick, actor, director and producer

==== Libertarian candidates ====
===== Eliminated in primary =====
- Mark Herd, Neighborhood Council board member

==== Green candidates ====
===== Eliminated in primary =====
- Michael Sachs, environmental technician

==== Independent candidates ====
===== Eliminated in primary =====
- Tom Fox, lawyer
- Marianne Williamson, author and spiritual teacher

===== Withdrawn =====
- Brent Roske, television producer and director

===== Declined =====
- Bill Bloomfield, businessman and Independent candidate for this seat in 2012

==== Endorsements ====
Elan Carr (R)

Executive branch officials

- Neel Kashkari, former assistant secretary of the Treasury for Financial Stability

U.S. senators

- John McCain, U.S. senator (R-AZ)

U.S. representatives

- Eric Cantor, former U.S. representative and House Majority Leader (VA-7)
- Paul Cook, U.S. representative (CA-8)
- Elton Gallegly, former U.S. representative (CA-24)
- Darrell Issa, U.S. representative (CA-49)
- Kevin McCarthy, U.S. representative and House Majority Leader (CA-23)
- Ed Royce, U.S. representative (CA-39)

Governors

- Mitt Romney, former governor of Massachusetts

U.S. ambassadors

- John Bolton, former United States ambassador to the United Nations

Organizations

- Republican Jewish Coalition

Labor unions

- Los Angeles Association of Deputy District Attorneys
- Los Angeles County Police Chiefs' Association

Newspapers and publications

- The Beverly Hills Courier

Local officials

- Michael D. Antonovich, member of the Los Angeles County Board of Supervisors
- Steve Cooley, former Los Angeles County District Attorney
- Jimmy Delshad, former mayor of Beverly Hills, California
- Alan Jackson, former Los Angeles County prosecutor
- John A. Mirisch, mayor of Beverly Hills, California

Individuals

- Sheldon Adelson, billionaire, business magnate, investor, philanthropist, and political donor
- Dennis Prager, conservative radio talk show host and writer
Wendy Greuel (D)

U.S. representatives

- Tony Cardenas, U.S. representative (CA-29)
- Lucille Roybal-Allard, U.S. representative (CA-40)
- Adam Schiff, U.S. representative (CA-28)

State officials

- Kamala Harris, California attorney general
- Gavin Newsom, lieutenant governor of California

State legislators

- Adrin Nazarian, state assembly member

Organizations

- EMILY's List
- Stonewall Young Democrats

Local officials

- Joe Buscaino, Los Angeles City Councilman
- Fred Gaines, mayor of Calabasas
- Tom LaBonge, Los Angeles City Councilman
- Nury Martinez, Los Angeles City Councilman
- Mary Sue Maurer, Calabasas City Councilman
- Mitch O'Farrell, Los Angeles City Councilman
- Rick Tuttle, former Los Angeles City Controller
- Antonio Villaraigosa, former mayor of Los Angeles
- Herb Wesson, president of the Los Angeles City Council

Individuals

- Ed Begley Jr., actor and environmental activist
- Henry Cisneros, former United States Secretary of Housing and Urban Development
- Bettina Duval, president and founder of CALIFORNIALIST
- Dolores Huerta, labor leader, civil rights activist, and co-founder of the National Farmworkers Association
- Rob Reiner, actor, director, and political activist
- Kathy Spillar, executive vice president of Feminist Majority
Ted Lieu (D)

U.S. representatives

- Karen Bass, U.S. representative (CA-37)
- Alan Lowenthal, U.S. representative (CA-47)
- Mark Takano, U.S. representative (CA-41)
- Maxine Waters, U.S. representative (CA-43)

State officials

- John Chiang, California State Controller
- Dave Jones, California Insurance Commissioner
- Bill Lockyer, California State Treasurer

State legislators

- Jim Beall, state senator
- Marty Block, state senator
- Susan Bonilla, state assembly member
- Joan Buchanan, state assembly member
- Ed Chau, state assembly member
- Kevin de Leon, state assembly member
- Noreen Evans, state senator
- Rich Gordon, state assembly member and former San Mateo County supervisor
- Isadore Hall, state assembly member
- Jerry Hill, state senator
- Ricardo Lara, state senator
- Holly Mitchell, state senator
- Bill Monning, state senator
- Al Muratsuchi, state assembly member
- John Pérez, Speaker of the California State Assembly
- Anthony Rendon, state assembly member
- Sebastian Ridley-Thomas, state assembly member
- Darrell Steinberg, President pro tempore of the California State Senate
- Norma Torres, state senator
- Mariko Yamada, state assembly member

Labor unions

- Association for Los Angeles Deputy Sheriffs
- International Longshore and Warehouse Union Locals 13 and 94
- Service Employees International Union
- Torrance Firefighters Association

Organizations

- Beach Cities Democratic Club
- California Democratic Party

Local officials

- Steve Aspel, mayor of Redondo Beach
- George Bird Jr., Palos Verdes Estates city councilman
- Mike Bonin, Los Angeles City Councilman
- Bill Brand, Redondo Beach city councilman
- Christine Cronin-Hurst, Manhattan Beach School Board member
- Don Dear, West Basin Water District Board member
- Michael DiVirgilio, mayor of Hermosa Beach
- Hany Fangary, Hermosa Beach city council member
- Bill Fournell, vice president of the Manhattan Beach School Board
- Jim Goodhart, mayor of Palos Verdes Estates
- Jerome Horton, chair of the California Board of Equalization
- Kay Jue, Palos Verdes library trustee
- Robert Katherman, Water Replenishment District Board member
- Jim Knight, mayor pro tem of Ranchos Palos Verdes
- Paul Koretz, Los Angeles City Councilman
- Carol Kwan, West Basin Municipal Water District Board member
- Don Lee, Torrance School Board member
- David Lesser, Manhattan Beach councilman
- Barbara Lucky, Palos Verdes Peninsula School District Board member
- Kevin McKeown, Santa Monica city council member
- Judy Mitchell, mayor of Rolling Hills Estates
- Cliff Numark, El Camino Community College District trustee
- Terry Ragins, Torrance School Board member
- Richard Riordan, former mayor of Los Angeles
- Bill Rosendahl, former Los Angeles City Councilman
- Mark Steffen, president of the Torrance School Board
- Debbie Stegura, Palos Verdes Library District trustee
- Peter Tucker, mayor pro tem of Hermosa Beach
- Tony Vasquez, Santa Monica city council member
- Bill Watkins, El Segundo School Board member
- Kurt Weideman, Torrance city councilman
- Michael Wermers, Torrance School Board member
- Ted Winterer, Santa Monica city council member
- Hope Witkowsky, former Torrance city councilman

Individuals

- Julian Burger, president of the Progressive Democratic Club
- Marta Evry, progressive activist and founder of Venice for Change
- Ilissa Gold, president of the Miracle Mile Democratic Club
- Peter Kelly, former chair of the California Democratic Party
- Connie Sullivan, president of the Palos Verdes Peninsula Democratic Club
- George Takei, actor and civil rights activist
Barbara Mulvaney (D)

Local officials

- Pat Russell, former president of the Los Angeles City Council
Marianne Williamson (NPP)

U.S. representatives

- Keith Ellison, U.S. representative from MN-05 (2007–2019)
- Alan Grayson, U.S. representative from FL-08 (2009–2011) and FL-09 (2013–2017)
- Dennis Kucinich, former U.S. representative from OH-10 (1997–2013); former candidate for president in 2004 and 2008

Governors

- Jennifer Granholm, former governor of Michigan (2003–2011)
- Jesse Ventura, former Reform Party governor of Minnesota (1999–2003)

Organizations

- Americans for Democratic Action, SoCal chapter (previously endorsed Lieu)
- Progressive Leaders for Democratic Action at UCLA

Party officials

- Eva Longoria, co-chairwoman of Barack Obama's 2012 presidential campaign, actress, and producer

Individuals

- Michael Beckwith, author and founder of the Agape International Spiritual Center
- Ed Begley Jr., actor and environmentalist
- Gabrielle Bernstein, author, motivational speaker, life coach, and Kundalini Yoga instructor
- Selma Blair, actress
- Jack Canfield, author, motivational speaker, and corporate trainer
- Deepak Chopra, author
- Katie Cleary, model and actress
- Seane Corn, yoga teacher, public speaker, and activist
- Marcia Cross, actress
- Ben Decker, author, meditation teacher, and public speaker
- Laura Dern, actress, director, and producer
- Frances Fisher, actress
- John Gray, author of Men Are From Mars, Women Are From Venus, lecturer, and relationship counselor
- Gurmukh, teacher of Kundalini Yoga
- Thom Hartmann, progressive political commentator, author, and former psychotherapist
- Barbara Marx Hubbard, futurist, author, and public speaker
- Van Jones, CNN news commentator, author, and lawyer
- Kim Kardashian, media personality, model, and actress
- Kourtney Kardashian, media personality and model
- Andrew Keegan, actor
- Chaka Khan, singer-songwriter
- Mastin Kipp, author, blogger, and inspirational speaker
- Elizabeth Kucinich, activist and producer; wife of former Rep. Dennis Kucinich
- Diane Ladd, actress
- Greg Louganis, Olympic platform diver, author, and LGBT activist
- Jane Lynch, actress and comedian
- Meredith Scott Lynn, actress, producer, and director
- Bruce Margolin, executive director of NORML Los Angeles chapter (1973–present); Democratic candidate for governor in 2003
- Alanis Morissette, singer-songwriter, actress, and record producer
- Jason Mraz, singer-songwriter and guitarist
- Katy Perry, singer-songwriter
- Nicole Richie, actress and fashion designer
- Brent Roske, film producer; former Independent candidate for U.S. Congress from CA-33 in 2014
- Taylor Schilling, actress
- Sarah Silverman, stand-up comedian, actress, and writer
- Alana Stewart, actress, author, and former model (Republican)
- Steven Tyler, singer-songwriter and keyboardist
- Amber Valletta, supermodel and actress
- Neale Donald Walsch, author, actor, screenwriter, and speaker
- Kendra Wilkinson, model and television personality

==== Polling ====
Poll source	Date(s) administered	Sample size	Margin of error	Elan Carr (R)	Wendy Greuel (D)	Ted Lieu (D)	Brent Roske (I)	Marianne Williamson (I)	Undecided
Benenson Strategy Group^	February 12–13, 2014	500	± 4.3%	19%	29%	21%	1%	7%	13%

- ^ Internal poll for Wendy Greuel Campaign

==== Results ====
Nonpartisan blanket primary results
Party	Candidate	Votes	%
Republican	Elan Carr	23,476	21.6
Democratic	Ted Lieu	20,432	18.8
Democratic	Wendy Greuel	17,988	16.6
No party preference	Marianne Williamson	14,335	13.2
Democratic	Matt Miller	13,005	12.0
Republican	Lily Gilani	7,673	7.1
Republican	Kevin Mottus	2,561	2.4
Democratic	Barbara L. Mulvaney	2,516	2.3
Democratic	David Kanuth	1,554	1.4
Democratic	Kristie Holmes	994	0.9
Libertarian	Mark Matthew Herd	883	0.8
Green	Michael Ian Sachs	732	0.7
Democratic	Michael Shapiro	650	0.6
No party preference	Tom Fox	509	0.5
Democratic	Zein E. Obagi Jr.	477	0.4
Democratic	Vincent Flaherty	345	0.3
Democratic	James Graf	327	0.3
No party preference	Brent Roske (withdrawn)	188	0.2
No party preference	Theo Milonopoulos (write-in)	1	0.0
Total votes		108,646	100.0

=== General election ===
==== Endorsements ====
Ted Lieu (D)

U.S. representatives

- Karen Bass, U.S. representative (CA-37)
- Alan Lowenthal, U.S. representative (CA-47)
- Mark Takano, U.S. representative (CA-41)
- Maxine Waters, U.S. representative (CA-43)
- Henry Waxman, U.S. representative (CA-33)

State officials

- John Chiang, California State Controller
- Dave Jones, California Insurance Commissioner
- Bill Lockyer, California State Treasurer

State legislators

- Jim Beall, state senator
- Marty Block, state senator
- Susan Bonilla, state assembly member
- Joan Buchanan, state assembly member
- Ed Chau, state assembly member
- Kevin de Leon, state assembly member
- Noreen Evans, state senator
- Rich Gordon, state assembly member and former San Mateo County Supervisor
- Isadore Hall, state assembly member
- Jerry Hill, state senator
- Ricardo Lara, state senator
- Holly Mitchell, state senator
- Bill Monning, state senator
- Al Muratsuchi, state assembly member
- John Pérez, Speaker of the California State Assembly
- Anthony Rendon, state assembly member
- Sebastian Ridley-Thomas, state assembly member
- Darrell Steinberg, President pro tempore of the California State Senate
- Norma Torres, state senator
- Mariko Yamada, state assembly member

Labor unions

- Association for Los Angeles Deputy Sheriffs
- California School Employees Association
- California Teachers Association
- International Longshore and Warehouse Union Locals 13 and 94
- Service Employees International Union
- Torrance Firefighters Association

Organizations

- BIPAC
- People for the American Way
- Progressive Democrats of America
- VoteVets

Individuals

- George Takei, actor and civil rights activist
Elan Carr (R)

Executive branch officials

- Neel Kashkari, former assistant secretary of the Treasury for Financial Stability

U.S. senators

- John McCain, U.S. senator (R-AZ)

U.S. representatives

- Eric Cantor, former U.S. representative and House Majority Leader (VA-7)
- Paul Cook, U.S. representative (CA-8)
- Elton Gallegly, former U.S. representative (CA-24)
- Darrell Issa, U.S. representative (CA-49)
- Kevin McCarthy, U.S. representative and House Majority Leader (CA-23)
- Ed Royce, U.S. representative (CA-39)

Governors

- Mitt Romney, former governor of Massachusetts

U.S. ambassadors

- John Bolton, former United States ambassador to the United Nations

Organizations

- National Republican Congressional Committee "Young Guns" Program
- Republican Jewish Coalition

Labor unions

- Los Angeles Association of Deputy District Attorneys
- Los Angeles County Police Chiefs' Association

Local officials

- Michael D. Antonovich, member of the Los Angeles County Board of Supervisors
- Steve Cooley, former Los Angeles County District Attorney
- Jimmy Delshad, former mayor of Beverly Hills, California
- Alan Jackson, former Los Angeles County prosecutor
- John A. Mirisch, mayor of Beverly Hills, California

Individuals

- Sheldon Adelson, billionaire, business magnate, investor, philanthropist, and political donor
- Dennis Prager, conservative radio talk show host and writer

==== Predictions ====
Source	Ranking	As of
The Cook Political Report	Safe D	November 3, 2014
Rothenberg	Safe D	October 24, 2014
Sabato's Crystal Ball	Safe D	October 30, 2014
RCP	Safe D	November 2, 2014
Daily Kos Elections	Safe D	November 4, 2014

==== Results ====
California's 33rd congressional district election, 2014
Party	Candidate	Votes	%
Democratic	Ted Lieu	108,331	59.2
Republican	Elan Carr	74,700	40.8
Total votes		183,031	100.0
Democratic hold			

== District 34 ==
2014 California's 34th congressional district election
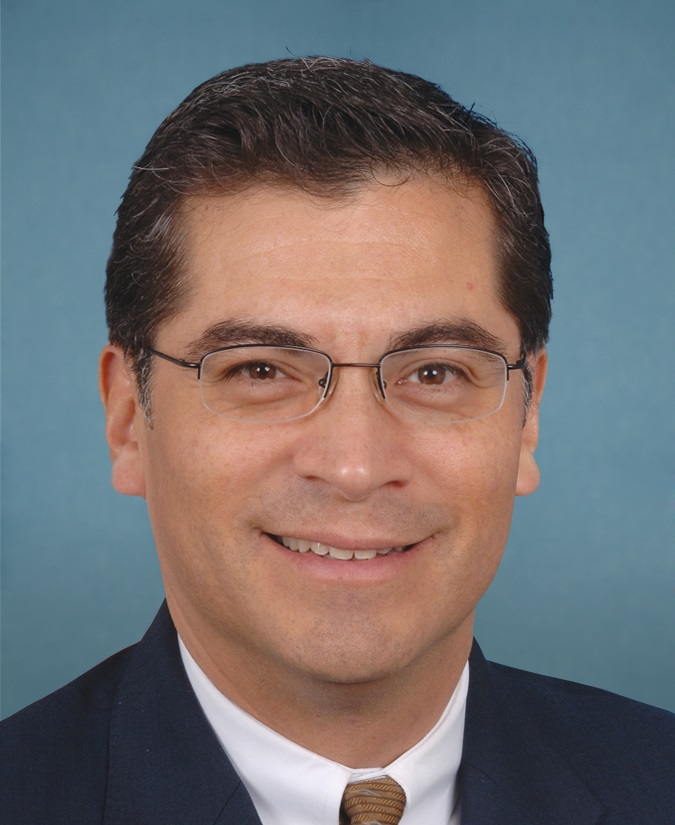

Nominee	Xavier Becerra	Adrienne Nicole Edwards
Party	Democratic	Democratic
Popular vote	44,697	16,924
Percentage	72.5%	27.5%
U.S. Representative before election
Xavier Becerra
Democratic
Elected U.S. Representative
Xavier Becerra
Democratic

The 34th district is based in central Los Angeles and includes Chinatown and Downtown Los Angeles. Incumbent Democrat Xavier Becerra, who had represented the 34th district since 2013 and previously represented the 31st district from 2003 to 2013 and the 30th district from 1993 to 2003, ran for re-election.

=== Primary election ===
==== Democratic candidates ====
===== Advanced to general =====
- Xavier Becerra, incumbent U.S. representative
- Adrienne Nicole Edwards, community organizer

==== Peace and Freedom candidates ====
===== Eliminated in primary =====
- Howard Johnson, attorney

==== Results ====
Nonpartisan blanket primary results
Party	Candidate	Votes	%
Democratic	Xavier Becerra (incumbent)	22,878	73.8
Democratic	Adrienne Nicole Edwards	4,473	14.4
Peace and Freedom	Howard Johnson	3,587	11.6
No party preference	Jonathan Turner Smith (write-in)	48	0.2
Total votes		30,986	100.0

=== General election ===
==== Predictions ====
Source	Ranking	As of
The Cook Political Report	Safe D	November 3, 2014
Rothenberg	Safe D	October 24, 2014
Sabato's Crystal Ball	Safe D	October 30, 2014
RCP	Safe D	November 2, 2014
Daily Kos Elections	Safe D	November 4, 2014

==== Results ====
California's 34th congressional district election, 2014
Party	Candidate	Votes	%
Democratic	Xavier Becerra (incumbent)	44,697	72.5
Democratic	Adrienne Nicole Edwards	16,924	27.5
Total votes		61,621	100.0
Democratic hold			

== District 35 ==
2014 California's 35th congressional district election
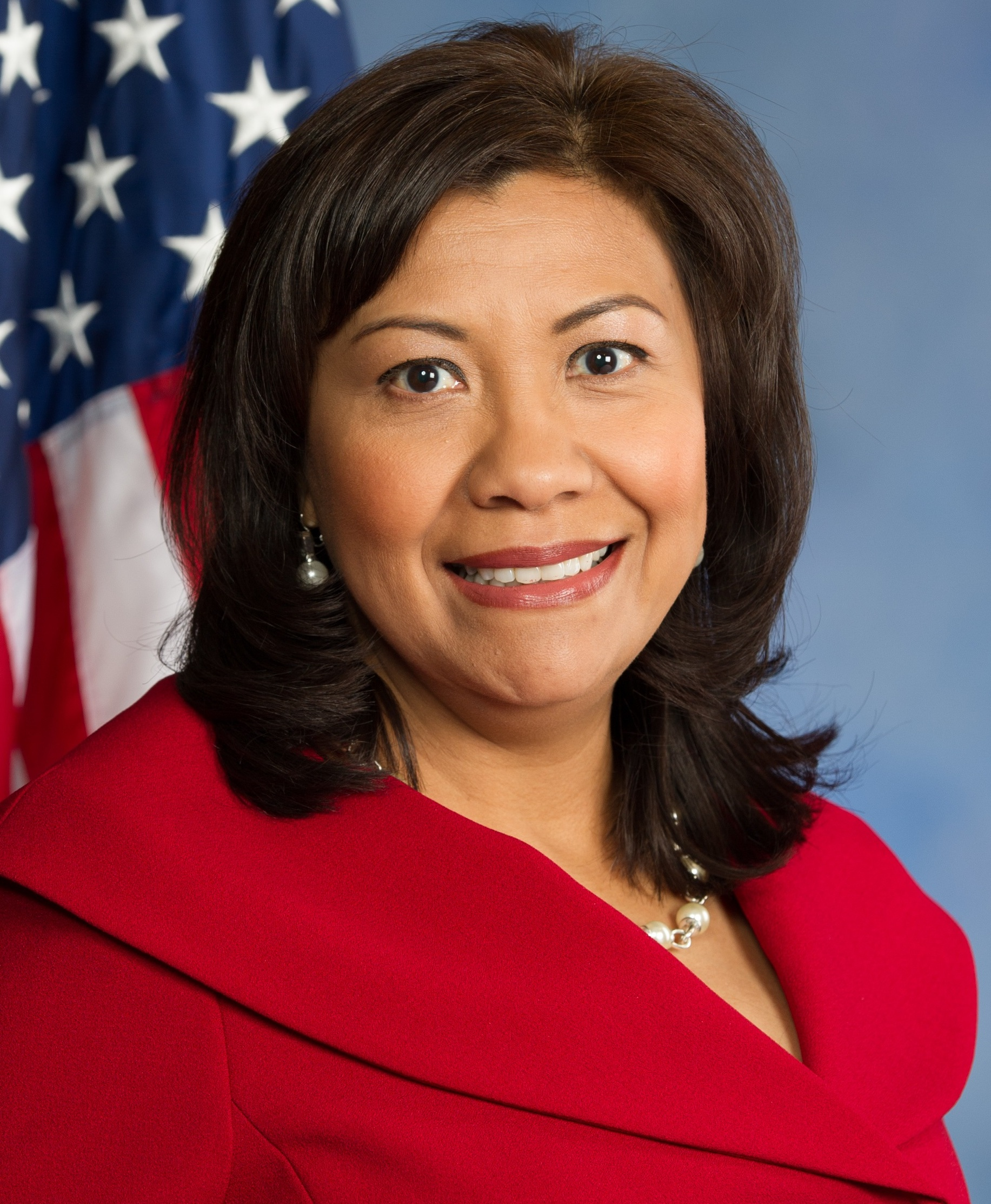

Nominee	Norma Torres	Christina Gagnier
Party	Democratic	Democratic
Popular vote	39,502	22,753
Percentage	63.5%	36.5%
U.S. Representative before election
Gloria Negrete McLeod
Democratic
Elected U.S. Representative
Norma Torres
Democratic

The 35th district is based in the Inland Empire and includes Fontana, Ontario, and Pomona. Incumbent Democrat Gloria Negrete McLeod, who had represented the 35th district since 2013, retired.

=== Primary election ===
==== Democratic candidates ====
===== Advanced to general =====
- Christina Gagnier, attorney
- Norma Torres, state senator

===== Eliminated in primary =====
- Scott Heydenfeldt, entrepreneur
- Anthony Vieyra, financial analyst

===== Withdrawn =====
- Paul Vincent Avila, Ontario city councilman

===== Declined =====
- Joe Baca, former U.S. representative (running for CA-31)
- Gloria Negrete McLeod, incumbent U.S. representative (running for San Bernardino County Board of Supervisors)

==== Republican candidates ====
===== Eliminated in primary =====
- Benjamin Lopez

===== Declined =====
- Gary Ovitt, San Bernardino County supervisor

==== Results ====
Nonpartisan blanket primary results
Party	Candidate	Votes	%
Democratic	Norma Torres	17,996	65.7
Democratic	Christina Gagnier	4,081	14.9
Democratic	Scott Heydenfeldt	2,574	9.4
Democratic	Anthony Vieyra	2,183	8.0
Republican	Benjamin "Ben" Lopez (write-in)	567	2.1
Total votes		27,401	100.0

=== General election ===
==== Endorsements ====
Norma Torres (D)

Organizations

- EMILY's List

==== Predictions ====
Source	Ranking	As of
The Cook Political Report	Safe D	November 3, 2014
Rothenberg	Safe D	October 24, 2014
Sabato's Crystal Ball	Safe D	October 30, 2014
RCP	Safe D	November 2, 2014
Daily Kos Elections	Safe D	November 4, 2014

==== Results ====
California's 35th congressional district election, 2014
Party	Candidate	Votes	%
Democratic	Norma Torres	39,502	63.5
Democratic	Christina Gagnier	22,753	36.5
Total votes		62,255	100.0
Democratic hold			

== District 36 ==
2014 California's 36th congressional district election
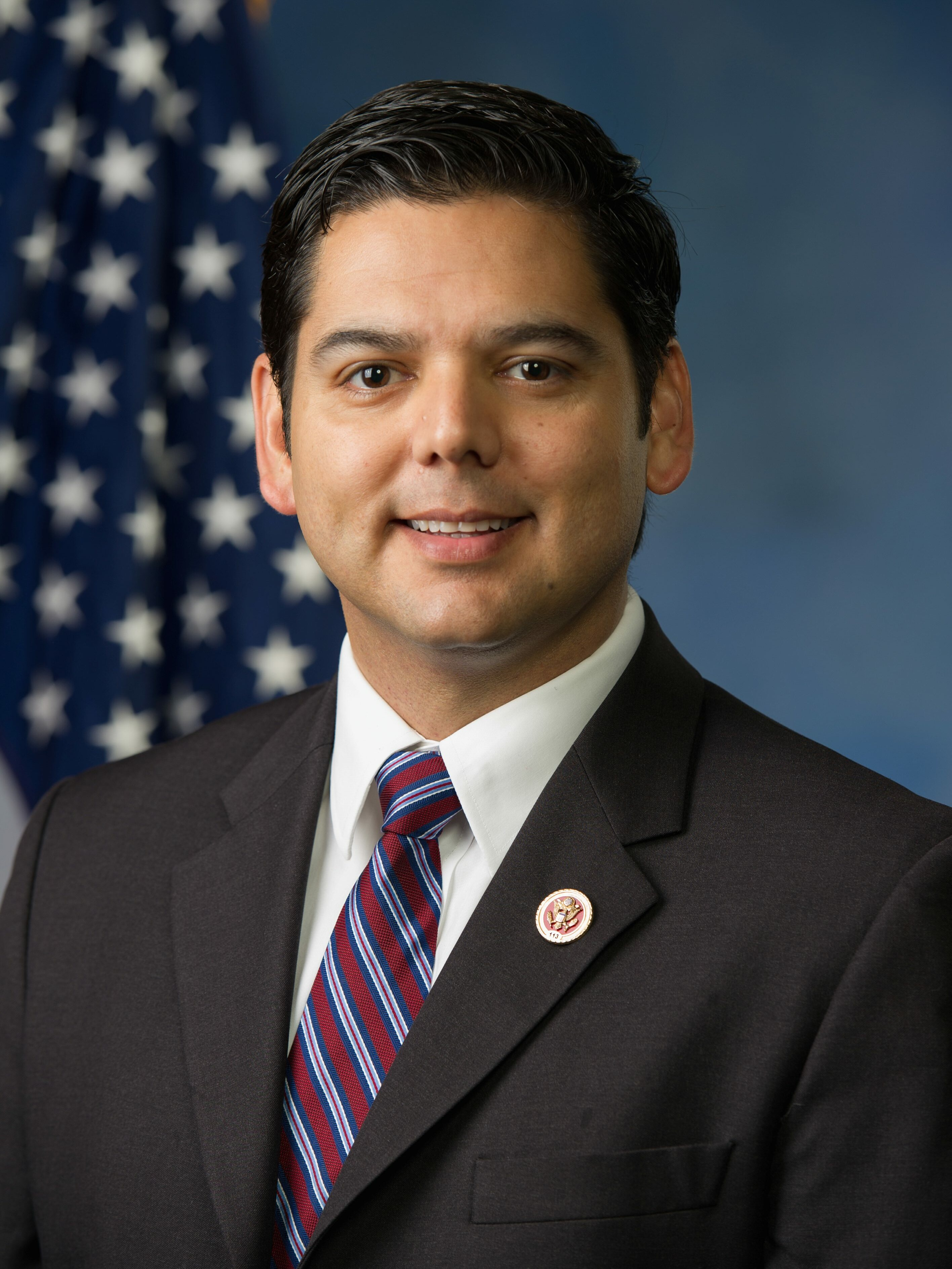

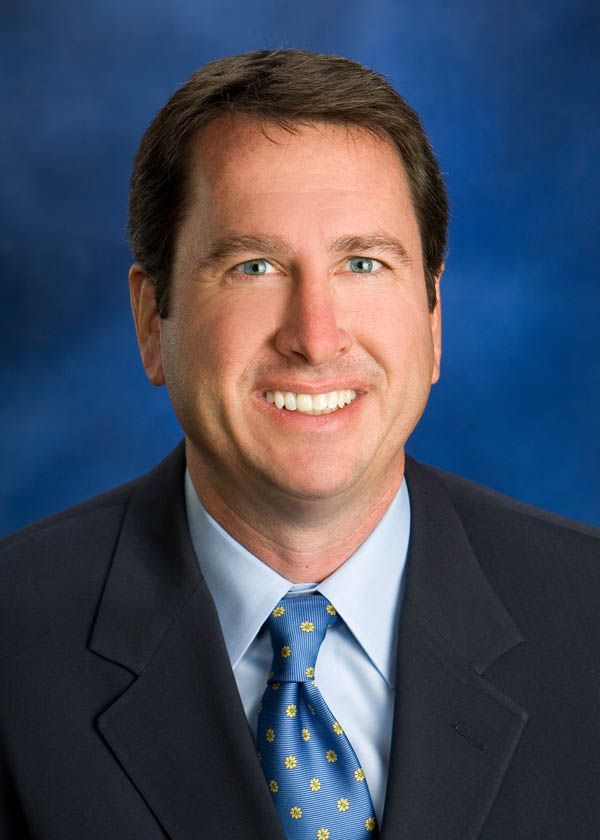
Nominee	Raul Ruiz	Brian Nestande
Party	Democratic	Republican
Popular vote	72,682	61,457
Percentage	54.2%	45.8%
- County results Ruiz: 50–60%
U.S. Representative before election
Raul Ruiz
Democratic
Elected U.S. Representative
Raul Ruiz
Democratic

The 36th district is based in eastern Riverside County and includes Palm Springs. Democrat Raul Ruiz, who had represented the 36th district since 2013, ran for re-election.

=== Primary election ===
==== Democratic candidates ====
===== Advanced to general =====
- Raul Ruiz, incumbent U.S. representative

==== Republican candidates ====
===== Advanced to general =====
- Brian Nestande, state assembly member

===== Eliminated in primary =====
- Ray Haynes, former state assembly member

==== Results ====
Nonpartisan blanket primary results
Party	Candidate	Votes	%
Democratic	Raul Ruiz (incumbent)	41,443	50.3
Republican	Brian Nestande	28,662	34.8
Republican	Ray Haynes	12,232	14.9
Total votes		82,337	100.0

=== General election ===
==== Campaign ====
Despite being touted as a formidable candidate, Nestande received criticism from other Republicans about his poor fundraising, which left him with only $235,000 in cash on hand after the primary, with Ruiz reporting more than $1.9 million in the bank at the same time.

Ruiz received much praise for assisting airline passengers in distress on two separate flights in July and October.

==== Endorsements ====
Raul Ruiz (D)

Organizations

- Democratic Congressional Campaign Committee "Frontline" Program
- No Labels
Brian Nestande (R)

Organizations

- National Republican Congressional Committee "Young Guns" Program

==== Debates ====
- Complete video of debate, October 5, 2014

==== Predictions ====
Source	Ranking	As of
The Cook Political Report	Lean D	November 3, 2014
Rothenberg	Safe D	October 24, 2014
Sabato's Crystal Ball	Lean D	October 30, 2014
RCP	Lean D	November 2, 2014
Daily Kos Elections	Lean D	November 4, 2014

==== Results ====
California's 36th congressional district election, 2014
Party	Candidate	Votes	%
Democratic	Raul Ruiz (incumbent)	72,682	54.2
Republican	Brian Nestande	61,457	45.8
Total votes		134,139	100.0
Democratic hold			

== District 37 ==
2014 California's 37th congressional district election
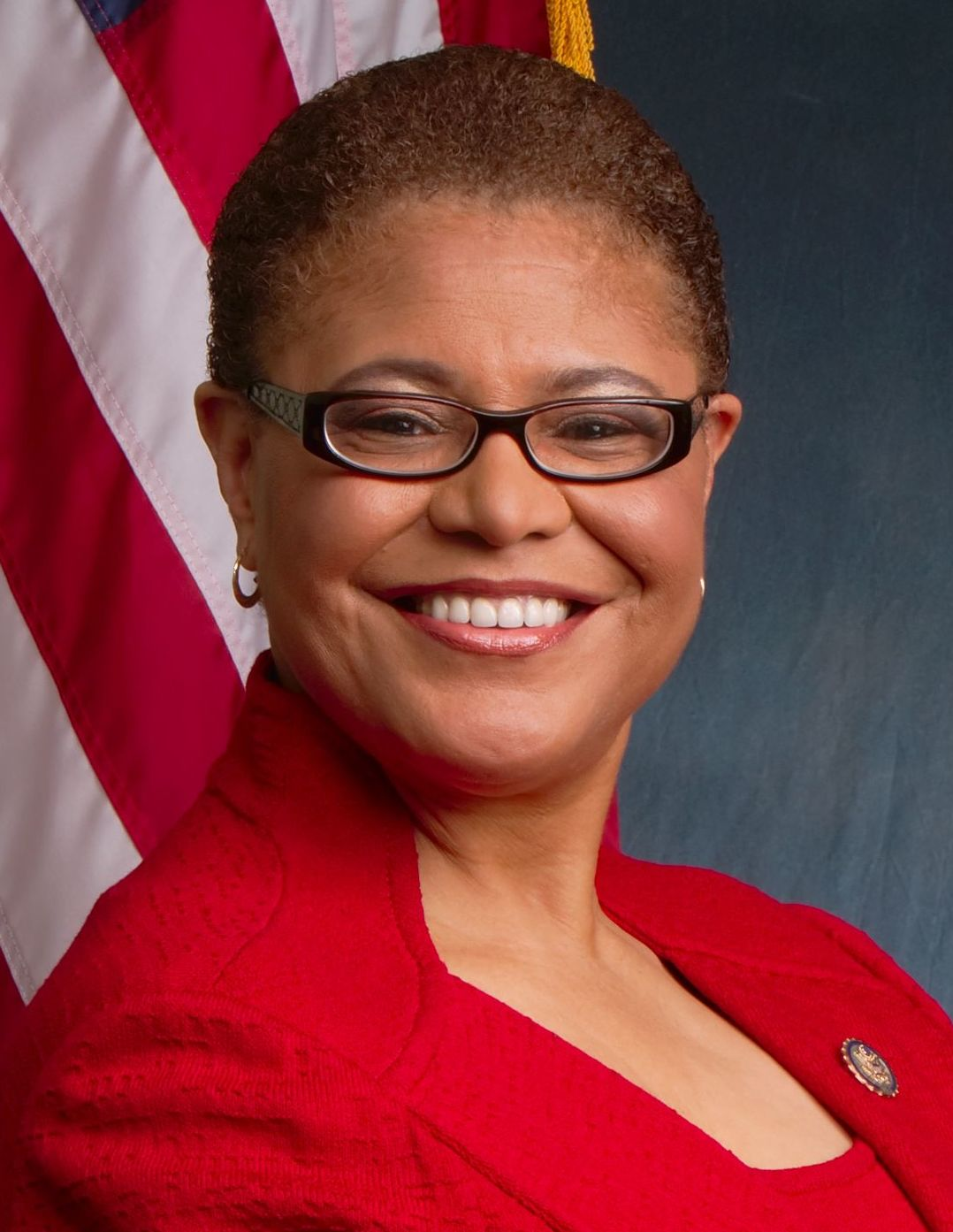

Nominee	Karen Bass	R. Adam King
Party	Democratic	Republican
Popular vote	96,787	18,051
Percentage	84.3%	15.7%
- County results Bass: 80–90%
U.S. Representative before election
Karen Bass
Democratic
Elected U.S. Representative
Karen Bass
Democratic

The 37th district is based in West Los Angeles and includes Crenshaw and Culver City. Incumbent Democrat Karen Bass, who had represented the 37th district since 2013 and previously represented the 33rd district from 2011 to 2013, ran for re-election.

=== Primary election ===
==== Democratic candidates ====
===== Advanced to general =====
- Karen Bass, incumbent U.S. representative

===== Eliminated in primary =====
- Mervin Evans, author and management consultant

==== Republican candidates ====
===== Advanced to general =====
- R. Adam King, entrepreneur

==== Results ====
Nonpartisan blanket primary results
Party	Candidate	Votes	%
Democratic	Karen Bass (incumbent)	47,639	79.6
Republican	R. Adam King	8,530	14.3
Democratic	Mervin Evans	3,677	6.1
Total votes		59,846	100.0

=== General election ===
==== Predictions ====
Source	Ranking	As of
The Cook Political Report	Safe D	November 3, 2014
Rothenberg	Safe D	October 24, 2014
Sabato's Crystal Ball	Safe D	October 30, 2014
RCP	Safe D	November 2, 2014
Daily Kos Elections	Safe D	November 4, 2014

==== Results ====
California's 37th congressional district election, 2014
Party	Candidate	Votes	%
Democratic	Karen Bass (incumbent)	96,787	84.3
Republican	R. Adam King	18,051	15.7
Total votes		114,838	100.0
Democratic hold			

== District 38 ==
2014 California's 38th congressional district election
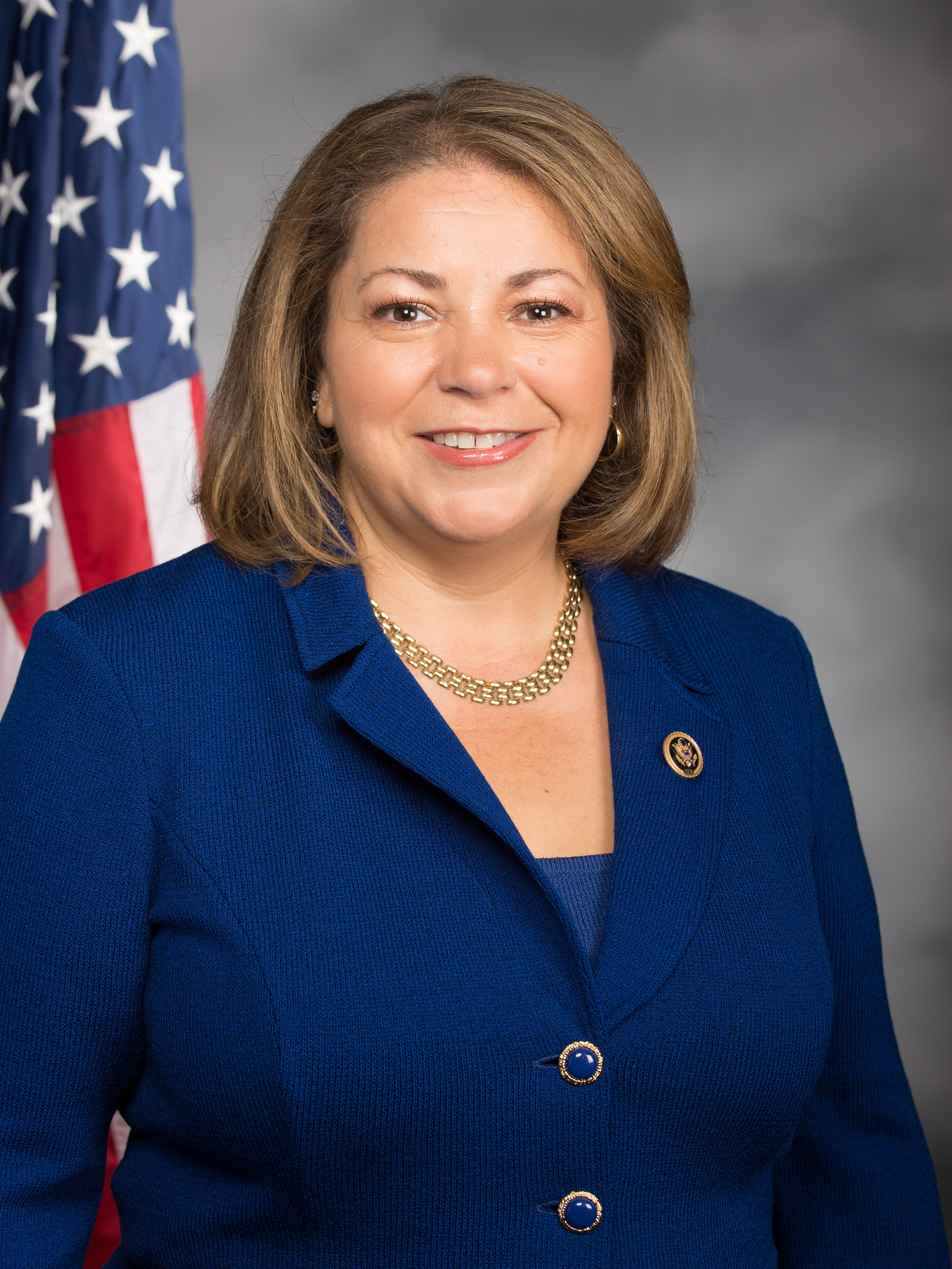

Nominee	Linda Sánchez	Benjamin Campos
Party	Democratic	Republican
Popular vote	58,192	40,288
Percentage	59.1%	40.9%
- County results Sanchez: 50–60% Campos: 50–60%
U.S. Representative before election
Linda Sánchez
Democratic
Elected U.S. Representative
Linda Sánchez
Democratic

The 38th district is based in the eastern Los Angeles suburbs and includes Norwalk and Whittier. Incumbent Democrat Linda Sánchez, who had represented the 38th district since 2013 and previously represented the 39th district from 2003 to 2013, ran for re-election.

=== Primary election ===
==== Democratic candidates ====
===== Advanced to general =====
- Linda Sánchez, incumbent U.S. representative

==== Republican candidates ====
===== Advanced to general =====
- Benjamin Campos, accountant

==== Results ====
Nonpartisan blanket primary results
Party	Candidate	Votes	%
Democratic	Linda Sánchez (incumbent)	27,149	57.5
Republican	Benjamin Campos	20,046	42.5
Total votes		47,195	100.0

=== General election ===
==== Predictions ====
Source	Ranking	As of
The Cook Political Report	Safe D	November 3, 2014
Rothenberg	Safe D	October 24, 2014
Sabato's Crystal Ball	Safe D	October 30, 2014
RCP	Safe D	November 2, 2014
Daily Kos Elections	Safe D	November 4, 2014

==== Results ====
California's 38th congressional district election, 2014
Party	Candidate	Votes	%
Democratic	Linda Sánchez (incumbent)	58,192	59.1
Republican	Benjamin Campos	40,288	40.9
Total votes		98,480	100.0
Democratic hold			

== District 39 ==
2014 California's 39th congressional district election
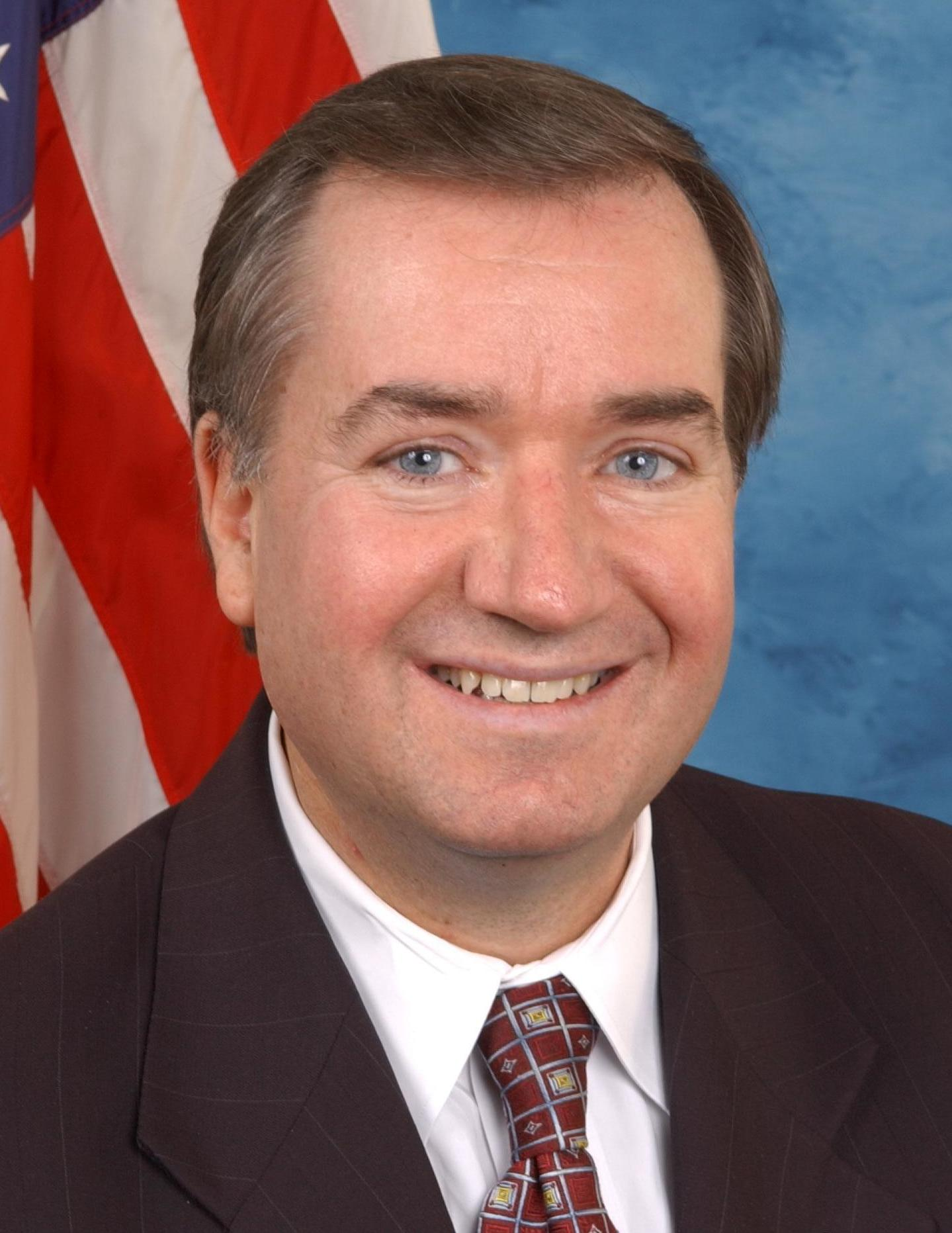

Nominee	Ed Royce	Peter O. Anderson
Party	Republican	Democratic
Popular vote	91,319	41,906
Percentage	68.5%	31.4%
- County results Royce: 60–70% 70–80%
U.S. Representative before election
Ed Royce
Republican
Elected U.S. Representative
Ed Royce
Republican

The 39th district straddles the Los Angeles–Orange county border and includes Chino Hills, Diamond Bar, and Fullerton. Incumbent Republican Ed Royce, who had represented the 39th district since 2013 and previously represented the 40th district from 2003 to 2013 and the 39th district from 1993 to 2003, ran for re-election.

=== Primary election ===
==== Republican candidates ====
===== Advanced to general =====
- Ed Royce, incumbent U.S. representative

==== Democratic candidates ====
===== Advanced to general =====
- Peter Anderson, retired software engineer

==== Results ====
Nonpartisan blanket primary results
Party	Candidate	Votes	%
Republican	Ed Royce (incumbent)	49,071	70.6
Democratic	Peter O. Anderson	20,480	29.4
Total votes		69,551	100.0

=== General election ===
==== Predictions ====
Source	Ranking	As of
The Cook Political Report	Safe R	November 3, 2014
Rothenberg	Safe R	October 24, 2014
Sabato's Crystal Ball	Safe R	October 30, 2014
RCP	Safe R	November 2, 2014
Daily Kos Elections	Safe R	November 4, 2014

==== Results ====
California's 39th congressional district election, 2014
Party	Candidate	Votes	%
Republican	Ed Royce (incumbent)	91,319	68.5
Democratic	Peter O. Anderson	41,906	31.4
Total votes		133,225	100.0
Republican hold			

== District 40 ==
2014 California's 40th congressional district election
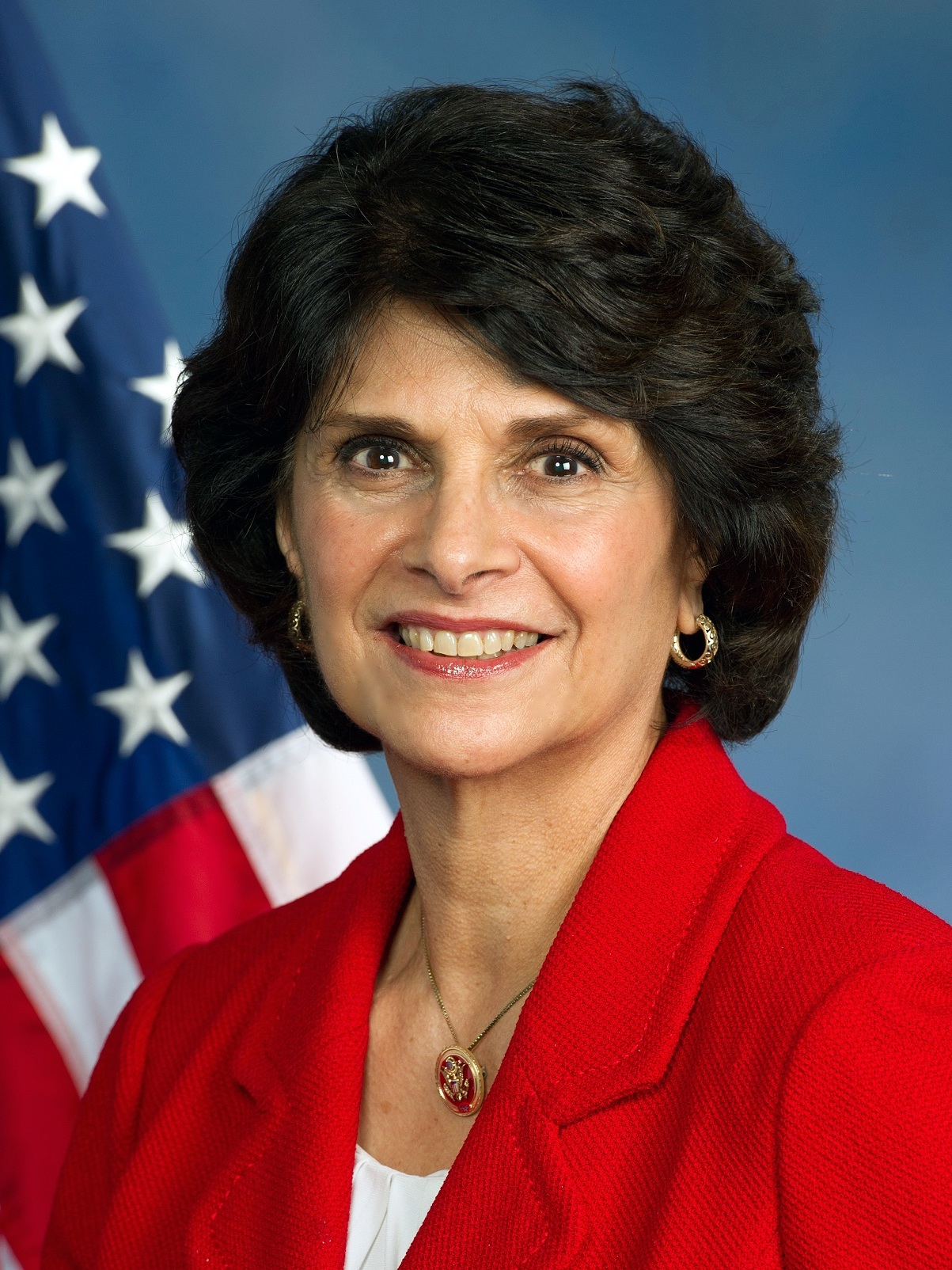

Nominee	Lucille Roybal-Allard	David Sanchez
Party	Democratic	Democratic
Popular vote	30,208	19,171
Percentage	61.2%	38.8%
U.S. Representative before election
Lucille Roybal-Allard
Democratic
Elected U.S. Representative
Lucille Roybal-Allard
Democratic

The 40th district is based in central Los Angeles County and includes Downey and East Los Angeles. Incumbent Democrat Lucille Roybal-Allard, who had represented the 40th district since 2013 and previously represented the 34th district from 2003 to 2013 and the 33rd district from 1993 to 2003, ran for re-election.

=== Primary election ===
==== Democratic candidates ====
===== Advanced to general =====
- Lucille Roybal-Allard, incumbent U.S. representative
- David Sanchez, retired college professor

==== Republican candidates ====
No Republicans filed.

==== Results ====
Nonpartisan blanket primary results
Party	Candidate	Votes	%
Democratic	Lucille Roybal-Allard (incumbent)	13,745	66.4
Democratic	David Sanchez	6,968	33.6
Total votes		20,713	100.0

=== General election ===
==== Predictions ====
Source	Ranking	As of
The Cook Political Report	Safe D	November 3, 2014
Rothenberg	Safe D	October 24, 2014
Sabato's Crystal Ball	Safe D	October 30, 2014
RCP	Safe D	November 2, 2014
Daily Kos Elections	Safe D	November 4, 2014

==== Results ====
California's 40th congressional district election, 2014
Party	Candidate	Votes	%
Democratic	Lucille Roybal-Allard (incumbent)	30,208	61.2
Democratic	David Sanchez	19,171	38.8
Total votes		49,379	100.0
Democratic hold			

== District 41 ==
2014 California's 41st congressional district election
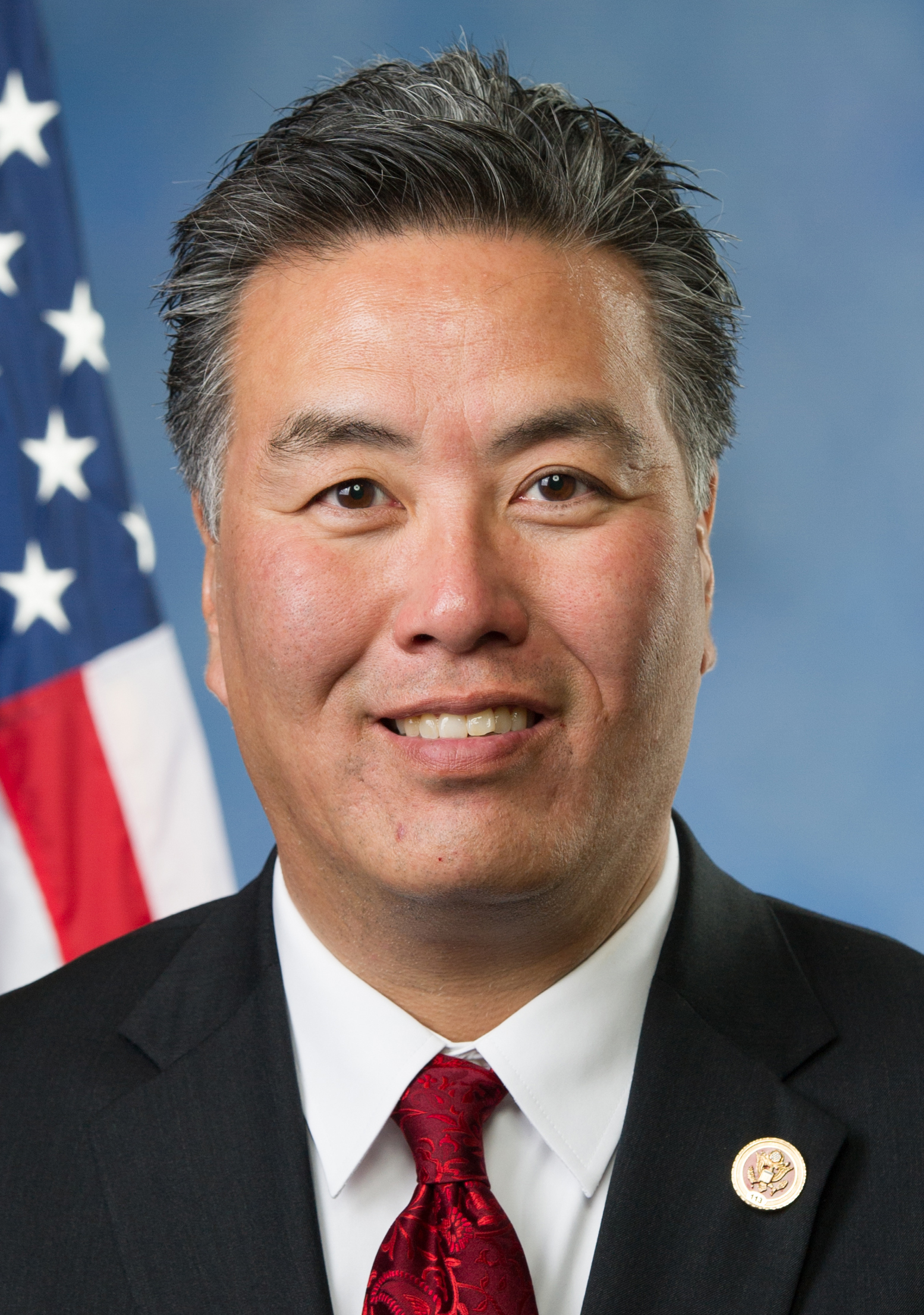

Nominee	Mark Takano	Steve Adams
Party	Democratic	Republican
Popular vote	46,948	35,936
Percentage	56.6%	43.4%
- County results Takano: 50–60%
U.S. Representative before election
Mark Takano
Democratic
Elected U.S. Representative
Mark Takano
Democratic

The 41st district is based in the Inland Empire and includes Moreno Valley, Perris, and Riverside. Incumbent Democrat Mark Takano, who had represented the 41st district since 2013, ran for re-election.

=== Primary election ===
==== Democratic candidates ====
===== Advanced to general =====
- Mark Takano, incumbent U.S. representative

===== Eliminated in primary =====
- Veronica Franco, healthcare administrator

==== Republican candidates ====
===== Advanced to general =====
- Steve Adams, Riverside City Council member

===== Eliminated in primary =====
- Yvonne Terrell Girard, judicial assistant

==== Results ====
Nonpartisan blanket primary results
Party	Candidate	Votes	%
Democratic	Mark Takano (incumbent)	19,648	44.7
Republican	Steve Adams	16,264	37.0
Democratic	Veronica Franco	4,509	10.2
Republican	Yvonne Terrell Girard	3,581	8.1
Total votes		44,002	100.0

=== General election ===
==== Endorsements ====
Mark Takano (D)

Organizations

- People for the American Way
- Progressive Change Campaign Committee

==== Polling ====
Poll source	Date(s) administered	Sample size	Margin of error	Mark Takano (D)	Steve Adams (R)	Undecided
Wenzel Strategies	February 28–March 3, 2014	618	± 3.92%	42%	42%	16%

==== Predictions ====
Source	Ranking	As of
The Cook Political Report	Safe D	November 3, 2014
Rothenberg	Safe D	October 24, 2014
Sabato's Crystal Ball	Safe D	October 30, 2014
RCP	Safe D	November 2, 2014
Daily Kos Elections	Safe D	November 4, 2014

==== Results ====
California's 41st congressional district election, 2014
Party	Candidate	Votes	%
Democratic	Mark Takano (incumbent)	46,948	56.6
Republican	Steve Adams	35,936	43.4
Total votes		82,884	100.0
Democratic hold			

== District 42 ==
2014 California's 42nd congressional district election
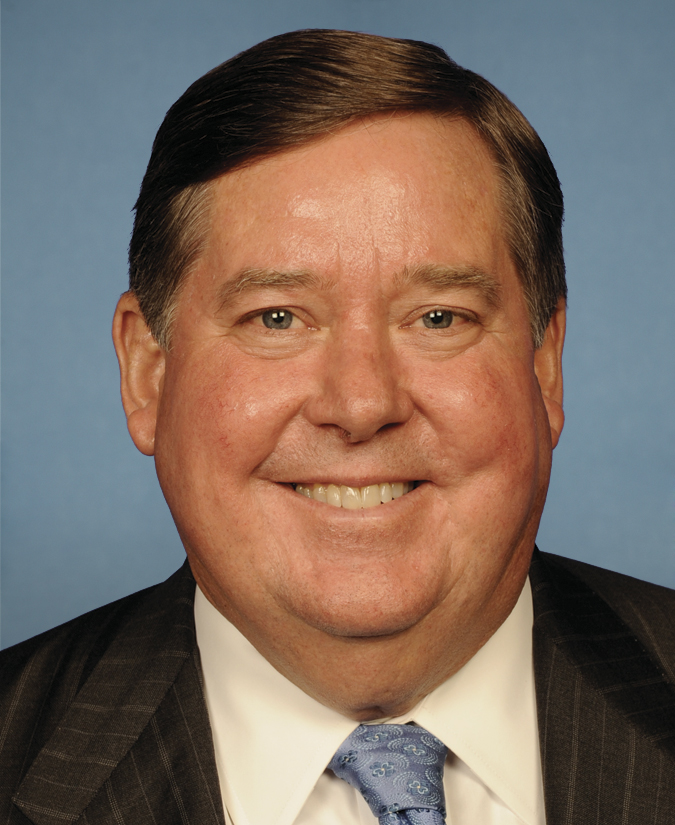

Nominee	Ken Calvert	Tim Sheridan
Party	Republican	Democratic
Popular vote	74,540	38,850
Percentage	65.7%	34.3%
- County results Calvert: 60–70%
U.S. Representative before election
Ken Calvert
Republican
Elected U.S. Representative
Ken Calvert
Republican

The 42nd district is based in the Inland Empire and includes Corona and Murrieta. Incumbent Republican Ken Calvert, who had represented the 42nd district since 2013 and previously represented the 44th district from 2003 to 2013 and the 43rd district from 1993 to 2003, ran for re-election.

=== Primary election ===
==== Republican candidates ====
===== Advanced to general =====
- Ken Calvert, incumbent U.S. representative

==== Democratic candidates ====
===== Advanced to general =====
- Tim Sheridan, national field representative

===== Eliminated in primary =====
- Kerri Condley, businesswoman and delegate for the California Democratic Party
- Chris Marquez, retired Marine sergeant

===== Withdrawn =====
- Boyd Roberts

==== Results ====
Nonpartisan blanket primary results
Party	Candidate	Votes	%
Republican	Ken Calvert (incumbent)	37,506	67.5
Democratic	Tim Sheridan	8,788	15.8
Democratic	Chris Marquez	6,118	11.0
Democratic	Kerri Condley	3,150	5.7
Republican	Floyd Harvey (write-in)	8	0.0
Total votes		55,570	100.0

=== General election ===
==== Predictions ====
Source	Ranking	As of
The Cook Political Report	Safe R	November 3, 2014
Rothenberg	Safe R	October 24, 2014
Sabato's Crystal Ball	Safe R	October 30, 2014
RCP	Safe R	November 2, 2014
Daily Kos Elections	Safe R	November 4, 2014

==== Results ====
California's 42nd congressional district election, 2014
Party	Candidate	Votes	%
Republican	Ken Calvert (incumbent)	74,540	65.7
Democratic	Tim Sheridan	38,850	34.3
Total votes		113,390	100.0
Republican hold			

== District 43 ==
2014 California's 43rd congressional district election
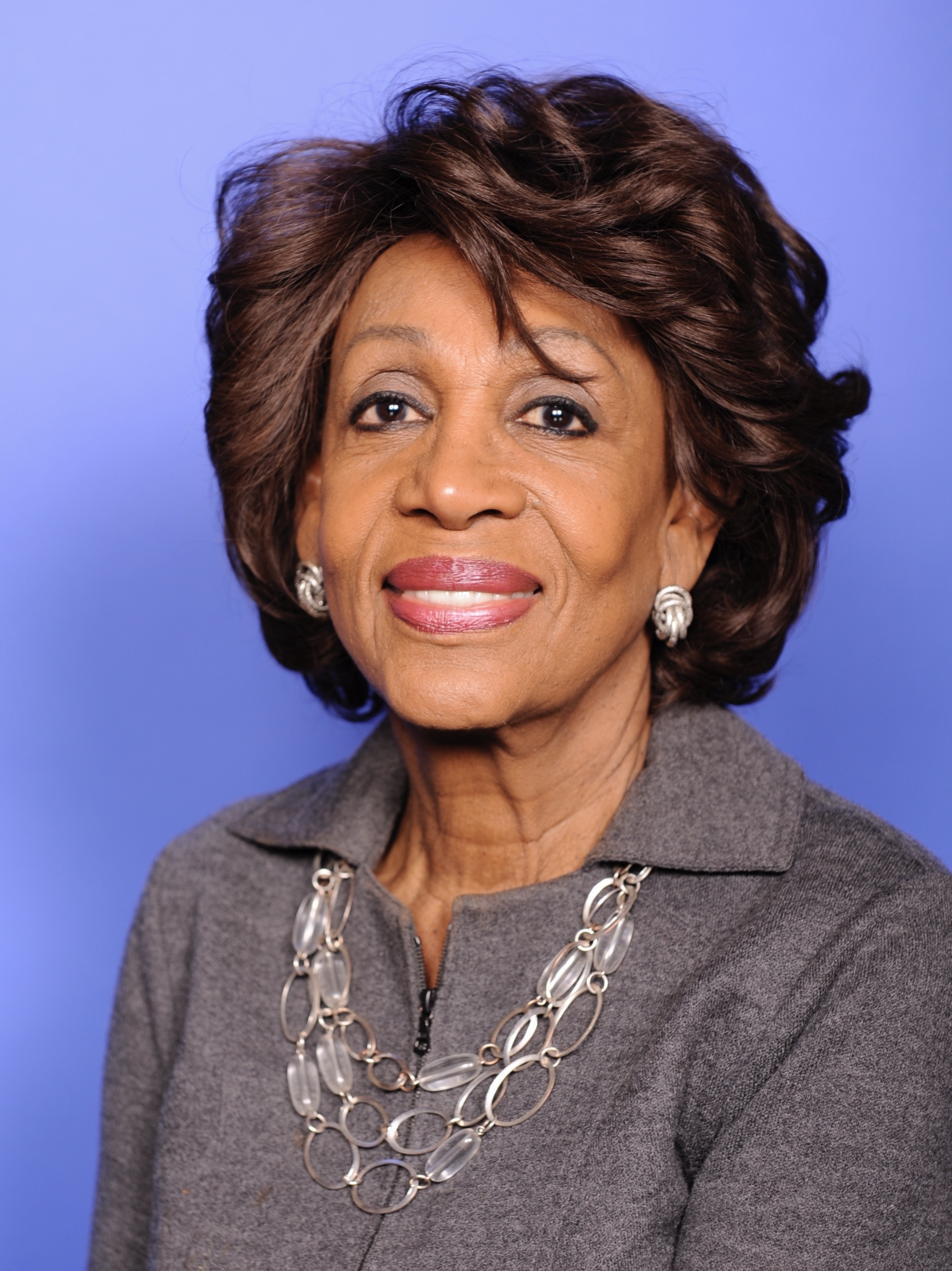

Nominee	Maxine Waters	John Wood Jr.
Party	Democratic	Republican
Popular vote	69,681	28,521
Percentage	71.0%	29.0%
- County results Waters: 70–80%
U.S. Representative before election
Maxine Waters
Democratic
Elected U.S. Representative
Maxine Waters
Democratic

The 43rd district is based in South Los Angeles and includes Hawthorne and Inglewood. Incumbent Democrat Maxine Waters, who had represented the 43rd district since 2013 and previously represented the 35th district from 1993 to 2013 and the 29th district from 1991 to 1993, ran for re-election.

=== Primary election ===
==== Democratic candidates ====
===== Advanced to general =====
- Maxine Waters, incumbent U.S. representative

==== Republican candidates ====
===== Advanced to general =====
- John Wood Jr., political writer and analyst

==== Results ====
Nonpartisan blanket primary results
Party	Candidate	Votes	%
Democratic	Maxine Waters (incumbent)	33,746	67.2
Republican	John Wood Jr.	16,440	32.8
American Independent	Brandon M. Cook (write-in)	12	0.0
Total votes		50,198	100.0

=== General election ===
==== Predictions ====
Source	Ranking	As of
The Cook Political Report	Safe D	November 3, 2014
Rothenberg	Safe D	October 24, 2014
Sabato's Crystal Ball	Safe D	October 30, 2014
RCP	Safe D	November 2, 2014
Daily Kos Elections	Safe D	November 4, 2014

==== Results ====
California's 43rd congressional district election, 2014
Party	Candidate	Votes	%
Democratic	Maxine Waters (incumbent)	69,681	71.0
Republican	John Wood Jr.	28,521	29.0
Total votes		98,202	100.0
Democratic hold			

== District 44 ==
2014 California's 44th congressional district election
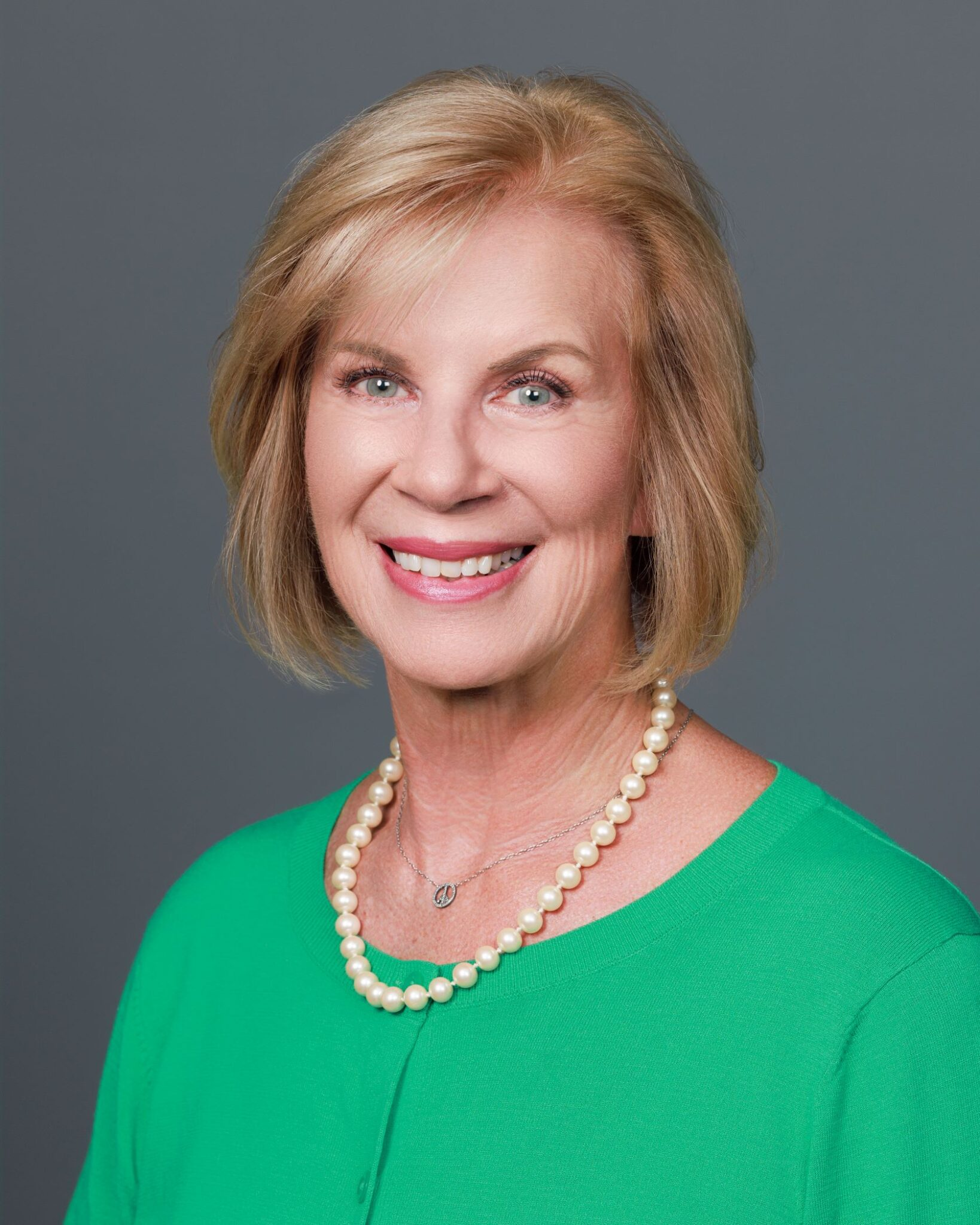

Nominee	Janice Hahn	Adam Shbeita
Party	Democratic	Peace and Freedom
Popular vote	59,670	9,192
Percentage	86.7%	13.3%
- County results Hahn: 80–90%
U.S. Representative before election
Janice Hahn
Democratic
Elected U.S. Representative
Janice Hahn
Democratic

The 44th district is based in south Los Angeles County and includes Carson, Compton, and San Pedro. Incumbent Democrat Janice Hahn, who had represented the 44th district since 2013 and previously represented the 36th district from 2011 to 2013, ran for re-election.

=== Primary election ===
==== Democratic candidates ====
===== Advanced to general =====
- Janice Hahn, incumbent U.S. representative

==== Republican candidates ====
No Republicans filed.

==== Results ====
Nonpartisan blanket primary results
Party	Candidate	Votes	%
Democratic	Janice Hahn (incumbent)	25,641	100.0
Peace and Freedom	Adam Shbeita (write-in)	5	0.0
Total votes		24,656	100.0

=== General election ===
==== Predictions ====
Source	Ranking	As of
The Cook Political Report	Safe D	November 3, 2014
Rothenberg	Safe D	October 24, 2014
Sabato's Crystal Ball	Safe D	October 30, 2014
RCP	Safe D	November 2, 2014
Daily Kos Elections	Safe D	November 4, 2014

==== Results ====
California's 44th congressional district election, 2014
Party	Candidate	Votes	%
Democratic	Janice Hahn (incumbent)	59,670	86.7
Peace and Freedom	Adam Shbeita	9,192	13.3
Total votes		68,862	100.0
Democratic hold			

== District 45 ==
2014 California's 45th congressional district election
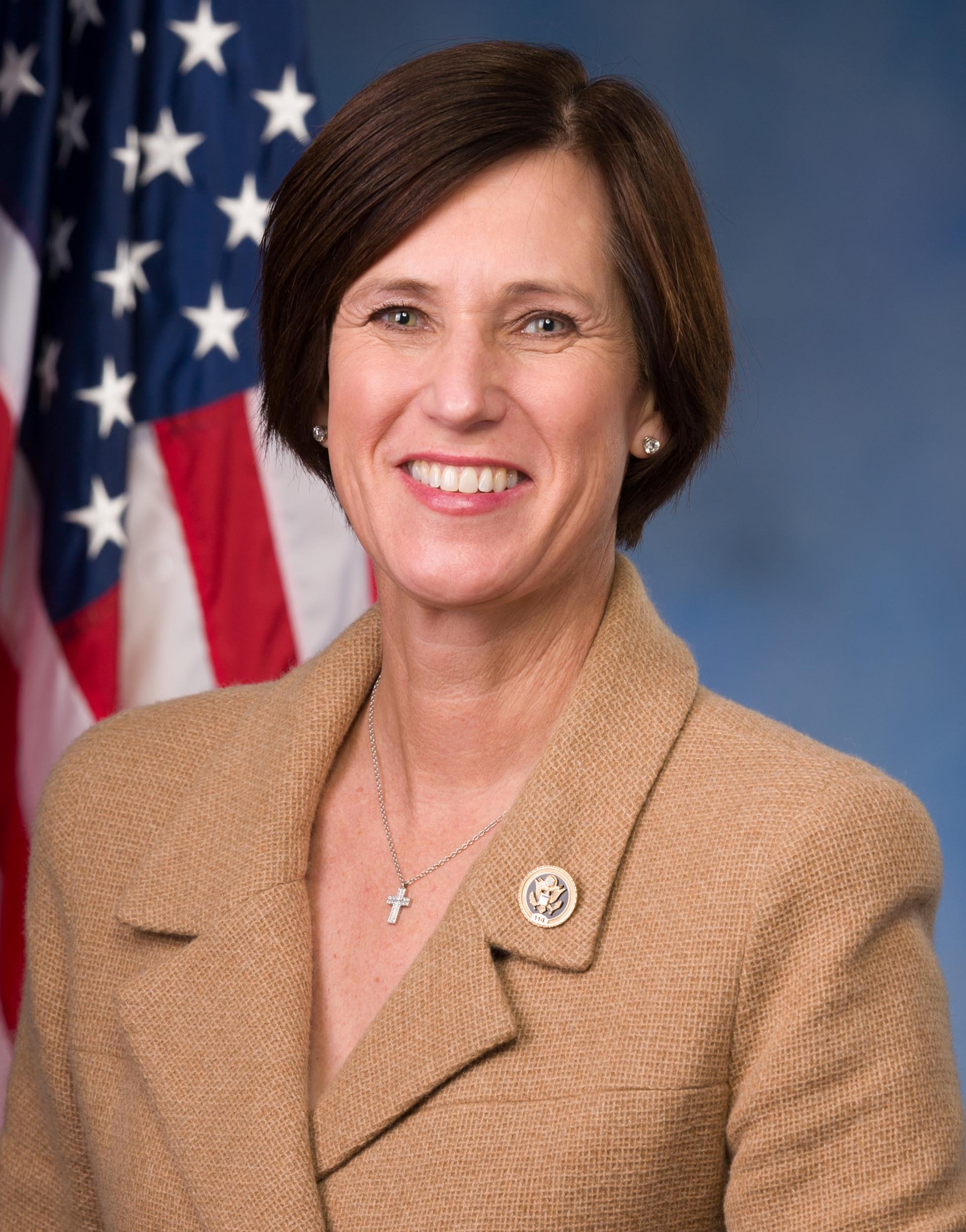

Nominee	Mimi Walters	Drew E. Leavens
Party	Republican	Democratic
Popular vote	106,083	56,819
Percentage	65.1%	34.9%
- County results Walters: 60–70%
U.S. Representative before election
John Campbell
Republican
Elected U.S. Representative
Mimi Walters
Republican

The 45th district is based in inland Orange County and includes Irvine and Mission Viejo. Incumbent Republican John Campbell, who had represented the 45th district since 2013 and previously represented the 48th district from 2005 to 2013, retired.

=== Primary election ===
John Moorlach withdrew from the race in March 2014, citing poor fundraising and his opponents' negative campaigns.

==== Republican candidates ====
===== Advanced to general =====
- Mimi Walters, state senator

===== Eliminated in primary =====
- Greg Raths, veteran and former commercial airline pilot

===== Withdrawn =====
- Pat Maciariello, investor
- John Moorlach, Orange County supervisor

===== Declined =====
- Dick Ackerman, former Minority Leader of the California Senate
- Patricia Bates, state assembly member
- Bill Campbell, former chair of the Orange County Board of Supervisors
- John Campbell, incumbent U.S. representative
- Steven Choi, Mayor of Irvine
- Christopher Cox, former U.S. representative
- Diane Harkey, state assembly member
- Neel Kashkari, former Assistant Secretary of the Treasury for International Affairs
- Jeff Lalloway, Irvine Council member
- Phil Liberatore, accountant and candidate for the 8th District in 2012
- Allan Mansoor, state assembly member
- Gary Miller, incumbent U.S. representative from the 45th District
- Kris Murray, Anaheim Council member
- Christina Shea, Irvine Council member
- Harry Sidhu, Anaheim Council member
- Todd Spitzer, Orange County Supervisor
- Michelle Steel, member of the California State Board of Equalization
- Tom Tait, mayor of Anaheim
- Gaddi Vasquez, United States Ambassador to the United Nations Agencies for Food and Agriculture
- Donald P. Wagner, state assembly member
- Fred Whitaker, Orange Council member

==== Democratic candidates ====
===== Advanced to general =====
- Drew Leavens, businessman

===== Declined =====
- Larry Agran, Irvine Council member
- Sukhee Kang, mayor of Irvine and general election candidate for this seat in 2012
- Beth Krom, Irvine Council member and nominee for this seat in 2010
- Teresa “Tita” Smith, mayor of Orange
- Steve Young, attorney

==== Polling ====
Hypothetical polling

Poll source	Date(s) administered	Sample size	Margin of error	Beth Krom (D)	Gary Miller (R)	Mimi Walters (R)	Undecided
Lewis Consulting Group	June 28–30, 2013	300	± 4.8%	21%	21%	25%	33%

Poll source	Date(s) administered	Sample size	Margin of error	Beth Krom (D)	Ed Royce (R)	Mimi Walters (R)	Undecided
Lewis Consulting Group	June 28–30, 2013	300	± 4.8%	22%	26%	20%	32%

Poll source	Date(s) administered	Sample size	Margin of error	Beth Krom (D)	Todd Spitzer (R)	Mimi Walters (R)	Undecided
Lewis Consulting Group	June 28–30, 2013	300	± 4.8%	22%	29%	20%	29%

Poll source	Date(s) administered	Sample size	Margin of error	Beth Krom (D)	Don Wagner (R)	Mimi Walters (R)	Undecided
Lewis Consulting Group	June 28–30, 2013	300	± 4.8%	23%	16%	27%	35%

Poll source	Date(s) administered	Sample size	Margin of error	Sukhee Kang (D)	Beth Krom (D)	Mimi Walters (R)	Steve Young (D)	Undecided
Lewis Consulting Group	June 28–30, 2013	300	± 4.8%	7%	10%	41%	9%	33%

==== Results ====
Nonpartisan blanket primary results
Party	Candidate	Votes	%
Republican	Mimi Walters	39,631	45.1
Democratic	Drew E. Leavens	24,721	28.1
Republican	Greg Raths	21,284	24.2
No party preference	Al Salehi	2,317	2.6
Total votes		87,953	100.0

=== General election ===
==== Endorsements ====
Mimi Walters (R)

U.S. representatives

- Ed Royce, U.S. representative (CA-39)

Organizations

- Maggie's List
- National Republican Congressional Committee "Vanguard" Program
- Susan B. Anthony List

Local officials

- Sandra Hutchens, sheriff-coroner of Orange County
- Tony Rackauckas, Orange County district attorney

==== Predictions ====
Source	Ranking	As of
The Cook Political Report	Safe R	November 3, 2014
Rothenberg	Safe R	October 24, 2014
Sabato's Crystal Ball	Safe R	October 30, 2014
RCP	Safe R	November 2, 2014
Daily Kos Elections	Safe R	November 4, 2014

==== Results ====
California's 45th congressional district election, 2014
Party	Candidate	Votes	%
Republican	Mimi Walters	106,083	65.1
Democratic	Drew E. Leavens	56,819	34.9
Total votes		162,902	100.0
Republican hold			

== District 46 ==
2014 California's 46th congressional district election
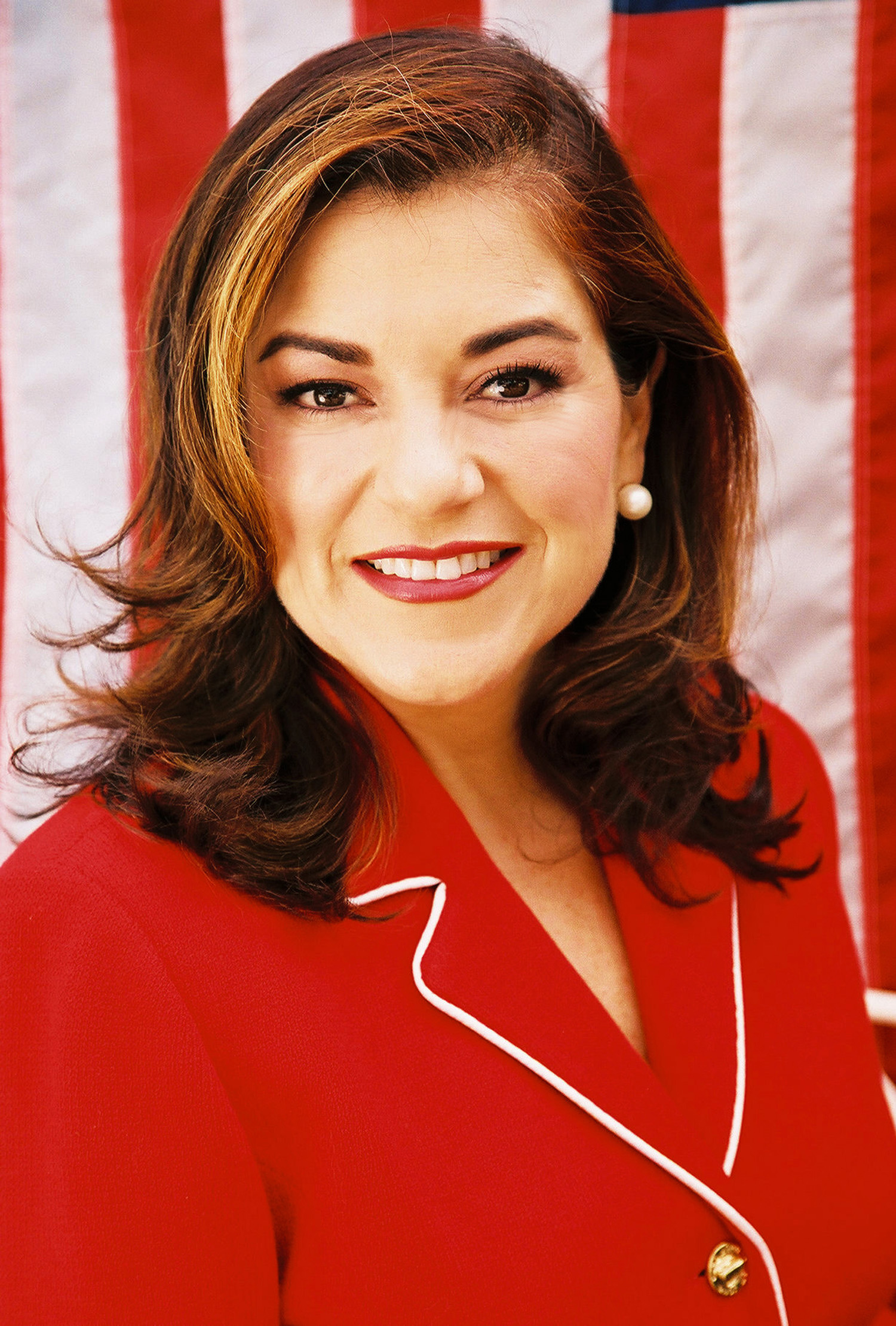

Nominee	Loretta Sanchez	Adam Nick
Party	Democratic	Republican
Popular vote	49,738	33,577
Percentage	59.7%	40.3%
- County results Sanchez: 50–60%
U.S. Representative before election
Loretta Sanchez
Democratic
Elected U.S. Representative
Loretta Sanchez
Democratic

The 46th district is based in central Orange County and includes Anaheim and Santa Ana. Incumbent Democrat Loretta Sanchez, who had represented the 46th district since 2013 and previously represented the 47th district from 2003 to 2013 and the 46th district from 1997 to 2003, ran for re-election.

=== Primary election ===
==== Democratic candidates ====
===== Advanced to general =====
- Loretta Sanchez, incumbent U.S. representative

===== Eliminated in primary =====
- Ehab Atalla, businessman

==== Republican candidates ====
===== Advanced to general =====
- Adam Nick, accountant, auditor and businessman

===== Eliminated in primary =====
- John J. Cullum, business owner and accountant
- Carlos Vazquez, business owner and educator

==== Results ====
Nonpartisan blanket primary results
Party	Candidate	Votes	%
Democratic	Loretta Sanchez (incumbent)	20,172	50.6
Republican	Adam Nick	7,234	18.1
Republican	John J. Cullum	5,666	14.2
Republican	Carlos Vazquez	4,969	12.5
Democratic	Ehab Atalla	1,835	4.6
Total votes		39,876	100.0

=== General election ===
==== Endorsements ====
Loretta Sanchez (D)

Organizations

- Blue Dog Coalition

==== Predictions ====
Source	Ranking	As of
The Cook Political Report	Safe D	November 3, 2014
Rothenberg	Safe D	October 24, 2014
Sabato's Crystal Ball	Safe D	October 30, 2014
RCP	Safe D	November 2, 2014
Daily Kos Elections	Safe D	November 4, 2014

==== Results ====
California's 46th congressional district election, 2014
Party	Candidate	Votes	%
Democratic	Loretta Sanchez (incumbent)	49,738	59.7
Republican	Adam Nick	33,577	40.3
Total votes		83,315	100.0
Democratic hold			

== District 47 ==
2014 California's 47th congressional district election
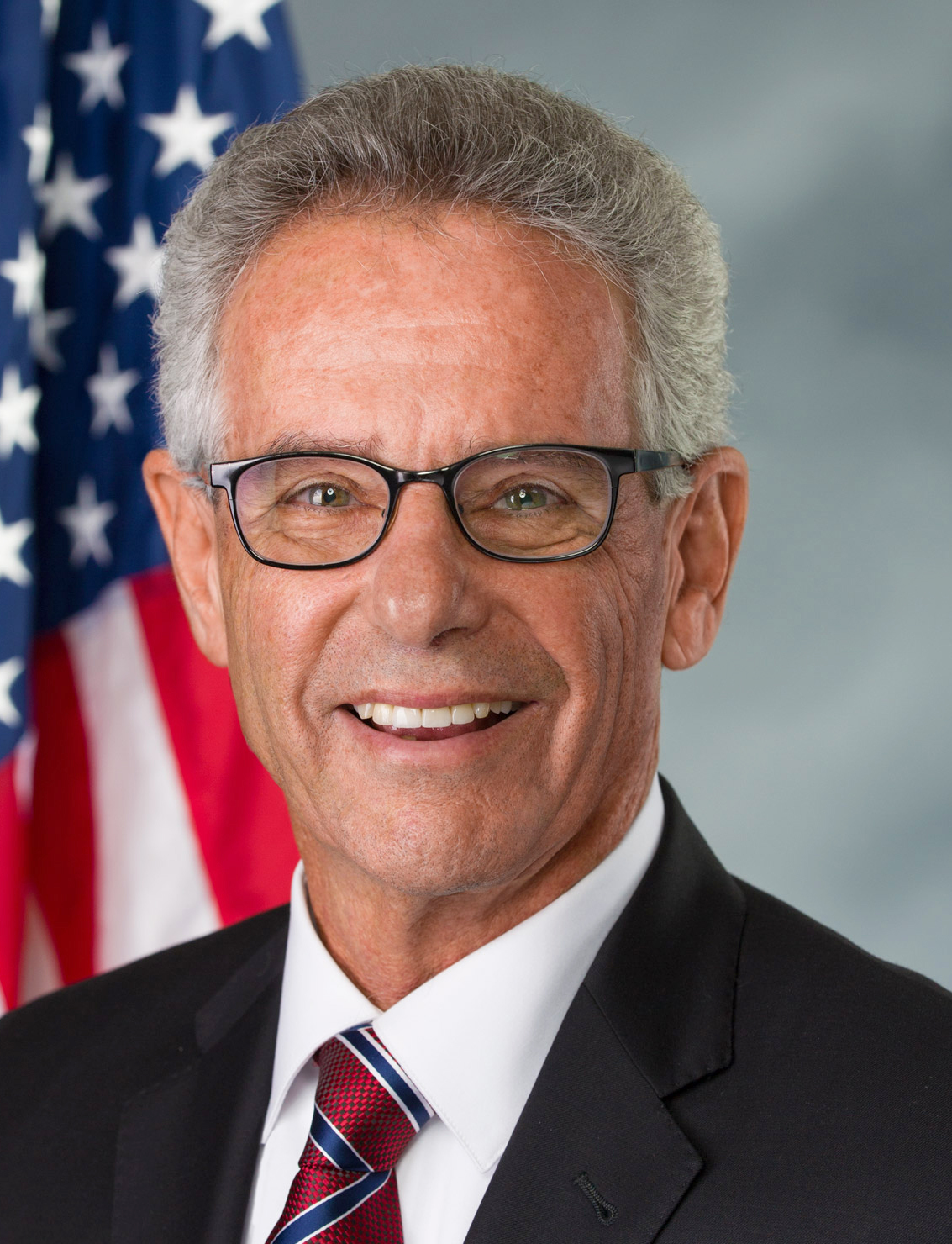

Nominee	Alan Lowenthal	Andy Whallon
Party	Democratic	Republican
Popular vote	69,061	54,309
Percentage	56.0%	44.0%
- County results Lowenthal: 60–70% Whallon: 50–60%
U.S. Representative before election
Alan Lowenthal
Democratic
Elected U.S. Representative
Alan Lowenthal
Democratic

The 47th district includes Long Beach and parts of Orange County. Incumbent Democrat Alan Lowenthal, who had represented the 47th district since 2013, ran for re-election.

=== Primary election ===
==== Democratic candidates ====
===== Advanced to general =====
- Alan Lowenthal, incumbent U.S. representative

==== Republican candidates ====
===== Advanced to general =====
- Andy Whallon, engineer and entrepreneur

==== Results ====
Nonpartisan blanket primary results
Party	Candidate	Votes	%
Democratic	Alan Lowenthal (incumbent)	44,019	57.1
Republican	Andy Whallon	33,093	42.9
Republican	George Brogan (write-in)	3	0.0
Total votes		77,115	100.0

=== General election ===
==== Endorsements ====
Alan Lowenthal (D)

Organizations

- No Labels

==== Predictions ====
Source	Ranking	As of
The Cook Political Report	Safe D	November 3, 2014
Rothenberg	Safe D	October 24, 2014
Sabato's Crystal Ball	Safe D	October 30, 2014
RCP	Safe D	November 2, 2014
Daily Kos Elections	Safe D	November 4, 2014

==== Results ====
California's 47th congressional district election, 2014
Party	Candidate	Votes	%
Democratic	Alan Lowenthal (incumbent)	69,061	56.0
Republican	Andy Whallon	54,309	44.0
Total votes		123,370	100.0
Democratic hold			

== District 48 ==
2014 California's 48th congressional district election
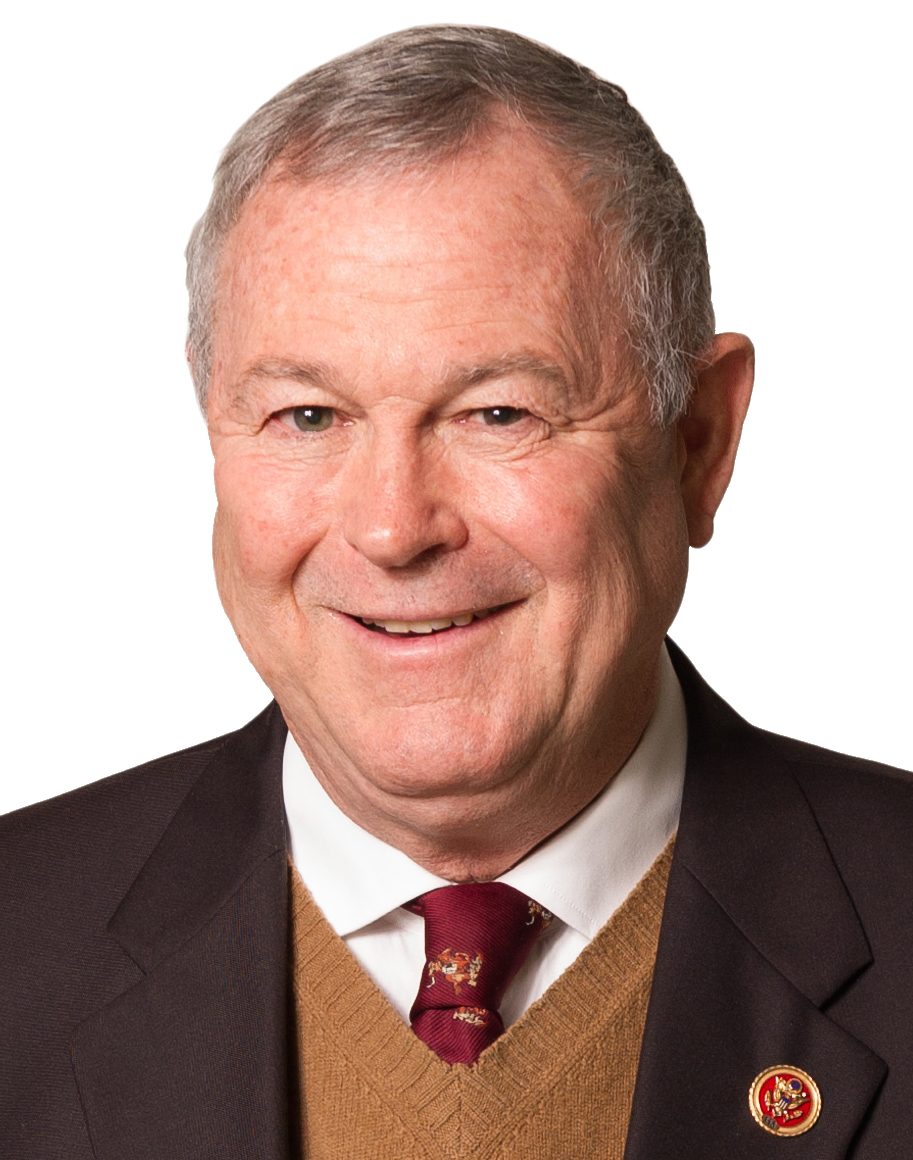

Nominee	Dana Rohrabacher	Suzanne Joyce Savary
Party	Republican	Democratic
Popular vote	112,082	62,713
Percentage	64.1%	35.9%
- County results Rohrabacher: 60–70%
U.S. Representative before election
Dana Rohrabacher
Republican
Elected U.S. Representative
Dana Rohrabacher
Republican

The 48th district is based in coastal Orange County and includes Huntington Beach. Incumbent Republican Dana Rohrabacher, who had represented the 48th district since 2013 and previously represented the 46th district from 2003 to 2013, the 45th district from 1993 to 2003, and the 42nd district from 1989 to 1993, ran for re-election.

=== Primary election ===
==== Republican candidates ====
===== Advanced to general =====
- Dana Rohrabacher, incumbent U.S. representative

===== Eliminated in primary =====
- Wendy Leece, Costa Mesa Council member

==== Democratic candidates ====
===== Advanced to general =====
- Sue Savary, business owner and educator

===== Eliminated in primary =====
- Robert John Banuelos, congressional community liaison
- David Burns, lawyer

==== Results ====
Nonpartisan blanket primary results
Party	Candidate	Votes	%
Republican	Dana Rohrabacher (incumbent)	52,431	56.1
Democratic	Suzanne Joyce Savary	18,242	19.5
Republican	Wendy Brooks Leece	11,082	11.9
Democratic	David Burns	6,142	6.6
Democratic	Robert John Banuelos	5,591	6.0
Total votes		93,488	100.0

=== General election ===
==== Endorsements ====
Dana Rohrabacher (R)

Organizations

- Republican Liberty Caucus

==== Predictions ====
Source	Ranking	As of
The Cook Political Report	Safe R	November 3, 2014
Rothenberg	Safe R	October 24, 2014
Sabato's Crystal Ball	Safe R	October 30, 2014
RCP	Safe R	November 2, 2014
Daily Kos Elections	Safe R	November 4, 2014

==== Results ====
California's 48th congressional district election, 2014
Party	Candidate	Votes	%
Republican	Dana Rohrabacher (incumbent)	112,082	64.1
Democratic	Suzanne Joyce Savary	62,713	35.9
Total votes		174,795	100.0
Republican hold			

== District 49 ==
2014 California's 49th congressional district election
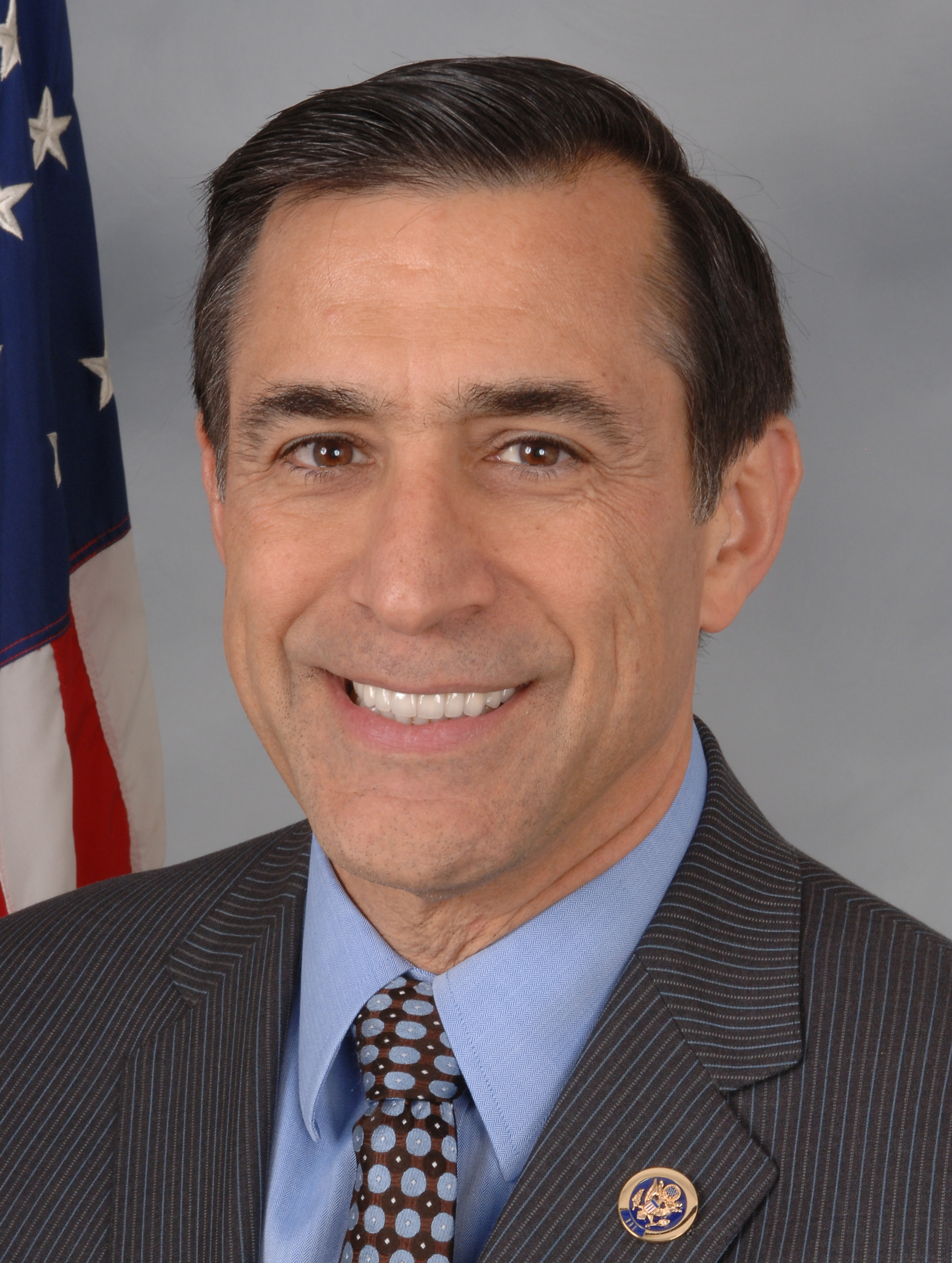

Nominee	Darrell Issa	Dave Peiser
Party	Republican	Democratic
Popular vote	98,161	64,981
Percentage	60.2%	39.8%
- County results Issa: 50–60% 60–70%
U.S. Representative before election
Darrell Issa
Republican
Elected U.S. Representative
Darrell Issa
Republican

The 49th district is based in northern San Diego County and includes Carlsbad and Oceanside. Incumbent Republican Darrell Issa, who had represented the 49th district since 2003 and the 48th district from 2001 to 2003, ran for re-election.

=== Primary election ===
==== Republican candidates ====
===== Advanced to general =====
- Darrell Issa, incumbent U.S. representative

==== Democratic candidates ====
===== Advanced to general =====
- Dave Peiser, local business owner

===== Eliminated in primary =====
- Noboru Isagawa, retired instructor

===== Withdrawn =====
- Johnny Moore, counsellor

==== Results ====
Nonpartisan blanket primary results
Party	Candidate	Votes	%
Republican	Darrell Issa (incumbent)	56,558	61.9
Democratic	Dave Peiser	25,946	28.4
Democratic	Noboru Isagawa	8,887	9.7
Democratic	Johnny Moore (write-in)	16	0.0
Total votes		91,407	100.0

=== General election ===
==== Endorsements ====
Dave Peiser (D)

Organizations

- Progressive Democrats of America

==== Predictions ====
Source	Ranking	As of
The Cook Political Report	Safe R	November 3, 2014
Rothenberg	Safe R	October 24, 2014
Sabato's Crystal Ball	Safe R	October 30, 2014
RCP	Safe R	November 2, 2014
Daily Kos Elections	Safe R	November 4, 2014

==== Results ====
California's 49th congressional district election, 2014
Party	Candidate	Votes	%
Republican	Darrell Issa (incumbent)	98,161	60.2
Democratic	Dave Peiser	64,981	39.8
Total votes		163,142	100.0
Republican hold			

== District 50 ==
2014 California's 50th congressional district election
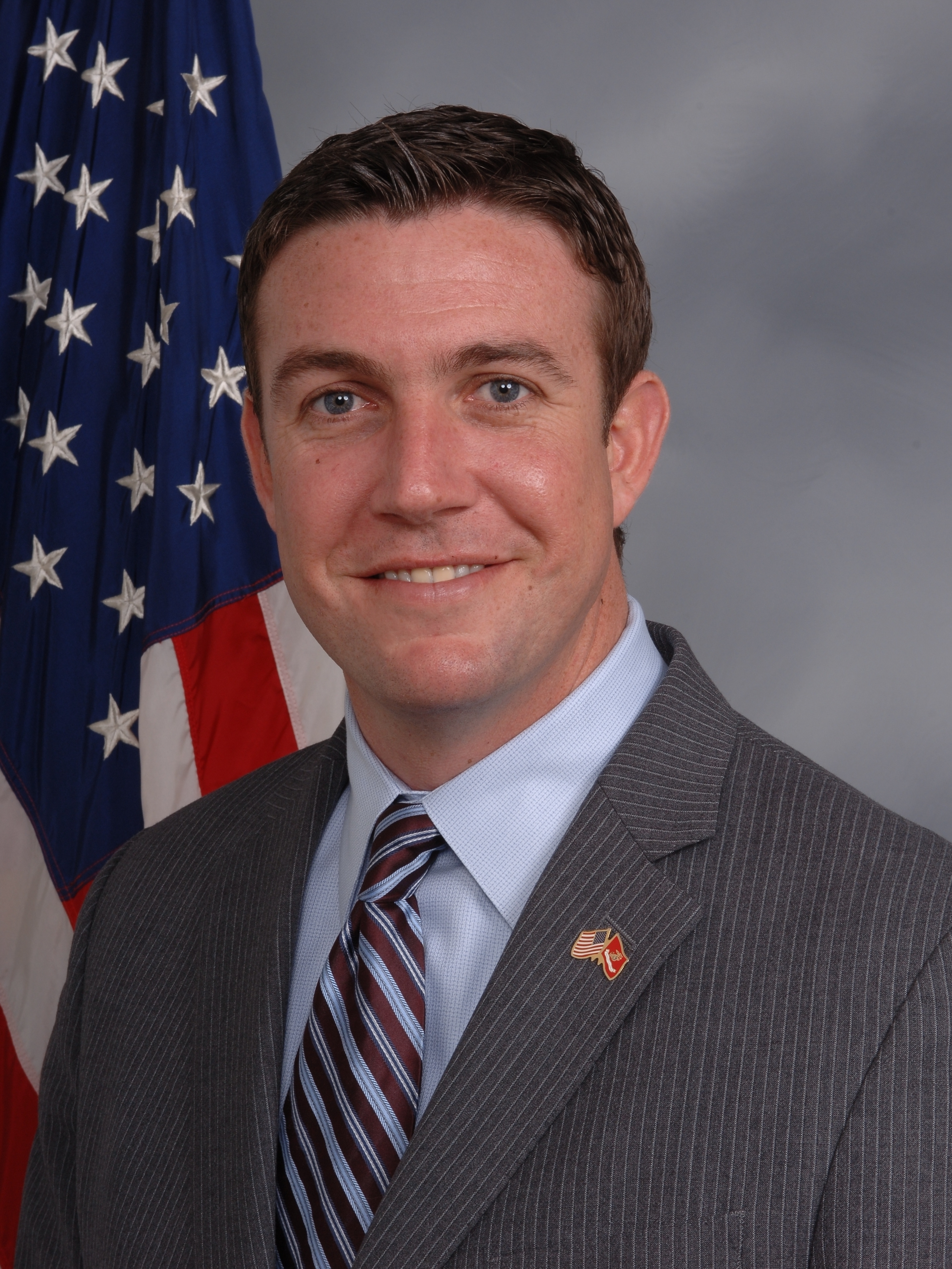

Nominee	Duncan D. Hunter	James H. Kimber
Party	Republican	Democratic
Popular vote	111,997	45,302
Percentage	71.2%	28.8%
- County results Hunter: 70–80%
U.S. Representative before election
Duncan D. Hunter
Republican
Elected U.S. Representative
Duncan D. Hunter
Republican

The 50th district is based in inland San Diego County and includes Escondido and Santee. Incumbent Republican Duncan D. Hunter, who had represented the 50th district since 2013 and previously represented the 52nd district from 2009 to 2013, ran for re-election.

=== Primary election ===
==== Republican candidates ====
===== Advanced to general =====
- Duncan D. Hunter, incumbent U.S. representative

==== Democratic candidates ====
===== Advanced to general =====
- James Kimber, physician's assistant

==== Libertarian candidates ====
===== Eliminated in primary =====
- Michael Benoit, retired business owner

==== Results ====
Nonpartisan blanket primary results
Party	Candidate	Votes	%
Republican	Duncan D. Hunter (incumbent)	62,371	70.4
Democratic	James H. Kimber	21,552	24.3
Libertarian	Michael Benoit	4,634	5.2
Total votes		88,557	100.0

=== General election ===
==== Predictions ====
Source	Ranking	As of
The Cook Political Report	Safe R	November 3, 2014
Rothenberg	Safe R	October 24, 2014
Sabato's Crystal Ball	Safe R	October 30, 2014
RCP	Safe R	November 2, 2014
Daily Kos Elections	Safe R	November 4, 2014

==== Results ====
California's 50th congressional district election, 2014
Party	Candidate	Votes	%
Republican	Duncan D. Hunter (incumbent)	111,997	71.2
Democratic	James H. Kimber	45,302	28.8
Total votes		157,299	100.0
Republican hold			

== District 51 ==
2014 California's 51st congressional district election
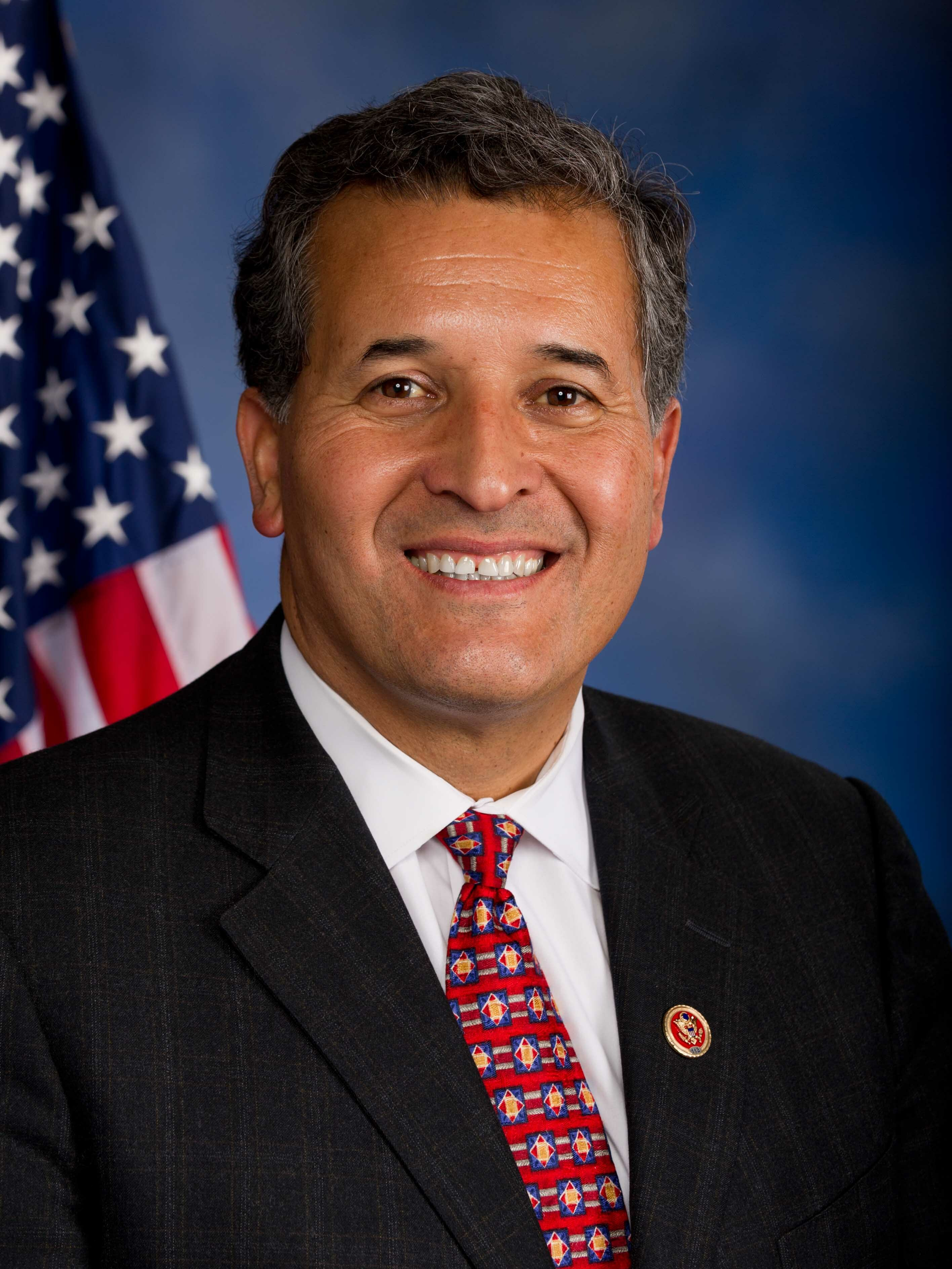

Nominee	Juan Vargas	Stephen Meade
Party	Democratic	Republican
Popular vote	56,373	25,577
Percentage	68.8%	32.2%
- County results Vargas: 60–70%
U.S. Representative before election
Juan Vargas
Democratic
Elected U.S. Representative
Juan Vargas
Democratic

The new 51st district runs along the border with Mexico and includes Imperial County and San Diego. Incumbent Democrat Juan Vargas, who had represented the 51st district since 2013, ran for re-election.

=== Primary election ===
==== Democratic candidates ====
===== Advanced to general =====
- Juan Vargas, incumbent U.S. representative

==== Republican candidates ====
===== Advanced to general =====
- Stephen Meade, self-employed broker

==== Results ====
Nonpartisan blanket primary results
Party	Candidate	Votes	%
Democratic	Juan Vargas (incumbent)	35,812	68.3
Republican	Stephen Meade	16,403	31.3
Republican	Ernest Griffes (write-in)	184	0.4
Total votes		52,216	100.0

=== General election ===
==== Predictions ====
Source	Ranking	As of
The Cook Political Report	Safe D	November 3, 2014
Rothenberg	Safe D	October 24, 2014
Sabato's Crystal Ball	Safe D	October 30, 2014
RCP	Safe D	November 2, 2014
Daily Kos Elections	Safe D	November 4, 2014

==== Results ====
California's 51st congressional district election, 2014
Party	Candidate	Votes	%
Democratic	Juan Vargas (incumbent)	56,373	68.8
Republican	Stephen Meade	25,577	32.2
Total votes		81,950	100.0
Democratic hold			

== District 52 ==
2014 California's 52nd congressional district election
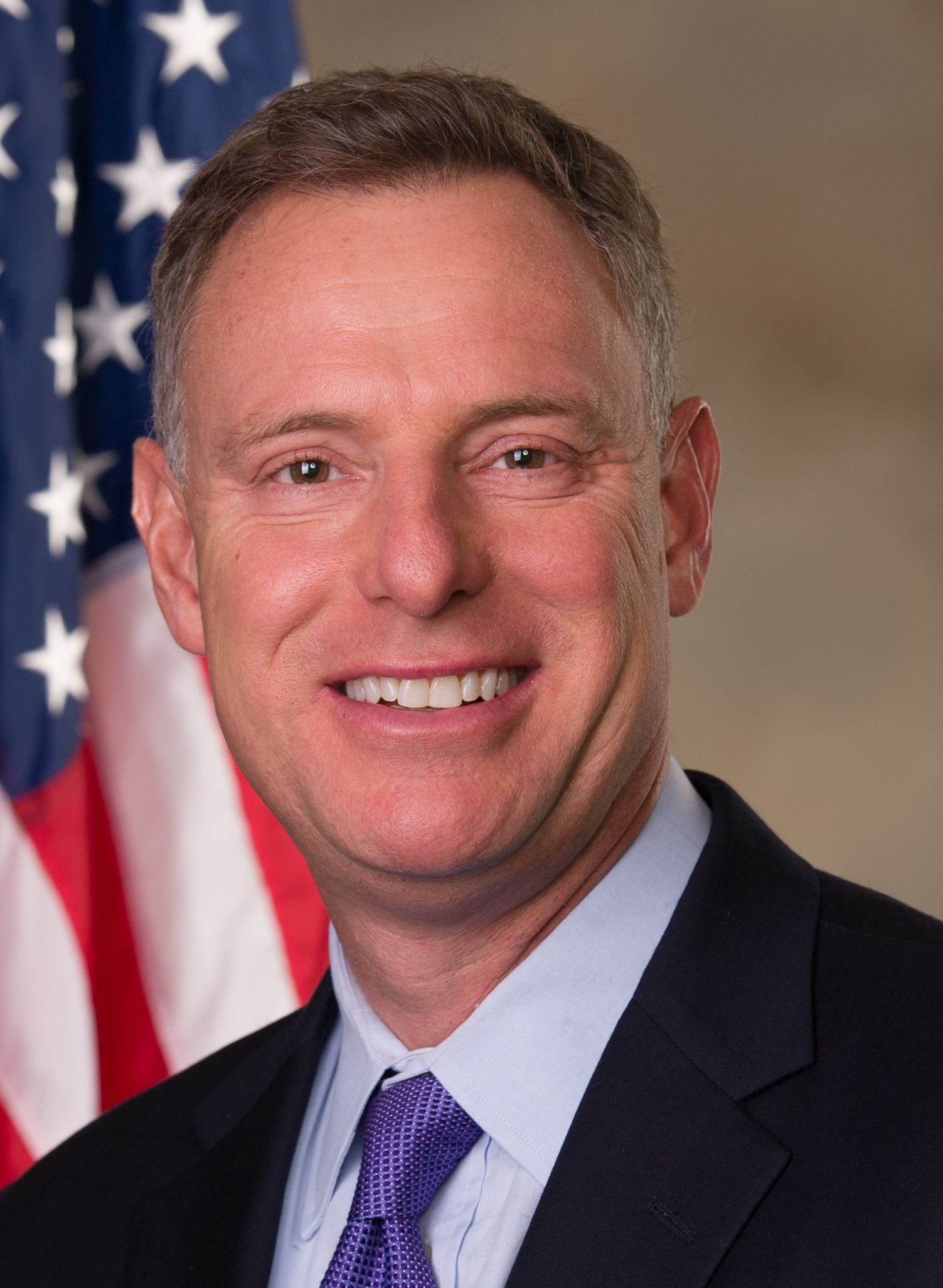

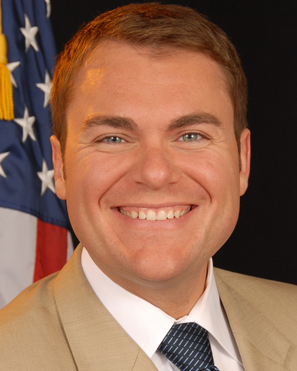
Nominee	Scott Peters	Carl DeMaio
Party	Democratic	Republican
Popular vote	98,826	92,746
Percentage	51.6%	48.4%
- County results Peters: 50–60%
U.S. Representative before election
Scott Peters
Democratic
Elected U.S. Representative
Scott Peters
Democratic

The 52nd district is based in coastal San Diego and includes La Jolla and Poway. Incumbent Democrat Scott Peters, who had represented the 52nd district since 2013, ran for re-election.

=== Primary election ===
==== Democratic candidates ====
===== Advanced to general =====
- Scott Peters, incumbent U.S. representative

==== Republican candidates ====
===== Advanced to general =====
- Carl DeMaio, former San Diego city council member and nominee for mayor of San Diego in 2012

===== Eliminated in primary =====
- Kirk Jorgensen, military officer and businessman
- Fred J. Simon Jr., trauma surgeon and businessman

==== Results ====
Nonpartisan blanket primary results
Party	Candidate	Votes	%
Democratic	Scott Peters (incumbent)	53,926	42.3
Republican	Carl DeMaio	44,954	35.3
Republican	Kirk Jorgensen	23,588	18.5
Republican	Fred J. Simon Jr.	5,040	4.0
Total votes		127,508	100.0

=== General election ===
==== Campaign ====
DeMaio faced sexual harassment charges from former campaign staffer Todd Bosnich; however, no charges were ever filed.

==== Endorsements ====
Scott Peters (D)

Organizations

- Democratic Congressional Campaign Committee "Frontline" Program
- No Labels
- United States Chamber of Commerce
Carl DeMaio (R)

Organizations

- BIPAC
- National Republican Congressional Committee "Young Guns" Program

==== Debates ====
- Complete video of debate, September 23, 2014

==== Polling ====
Poll source	Date(s) administered	Sample size	Margin of error	Scott Peters (D)	Carl DeMaio (R)	Undecided
SurveyUSA	October 27–30, 2014	551	± 4.3%	44%	45%	11%
New York Times/CBS News Battleground Tracker	October 16–23, 2014	460	± 7.0%	40%	49%	11%
SurveyUSA	October 17–20, 2014	608	± 4.1%	45%	46%	10%
SurveyUSA	October 2–6, 2014	542	± 4.3%	45%	48%	6%
SurveyUSA	September 11–15, 2014	559	± 4.2%	47%	46%	7%
GBA Strategies (D-House Majority PAC)	July 20–22, 2014	400	± 4.9%	48%	43%	8%
SurveyUSA	June 11–12, 2014	554	± 4.2%	44%	51%	6%
SurveyUSA	June 10–12, 2013	500	± 4.5%	39%	48%	13%

==== Predictions ====
Source	Ranking	As of
The Cook Political Report	Tossup	November 3, 2014
Rothenberg	Tossup	October 24, 2014
Sabato's Crystal Ball	Lean D	October 30, 2014
RCP	Tossup	November 2, 2014
Daily Kos Elections	Tossup	November 4, 2014

==== Results ====
California's 52nd congressional district election, 2014
Party	Candidate	Votes	%
Democratic	Scott Peters (incumbent)	98,826	51.6
Republican	Carl DeMaio	92,746	48.4
Total votes		191,572	100.0
Democratic hold			

== District 53 ==
2014 California's 53rd congressional district election
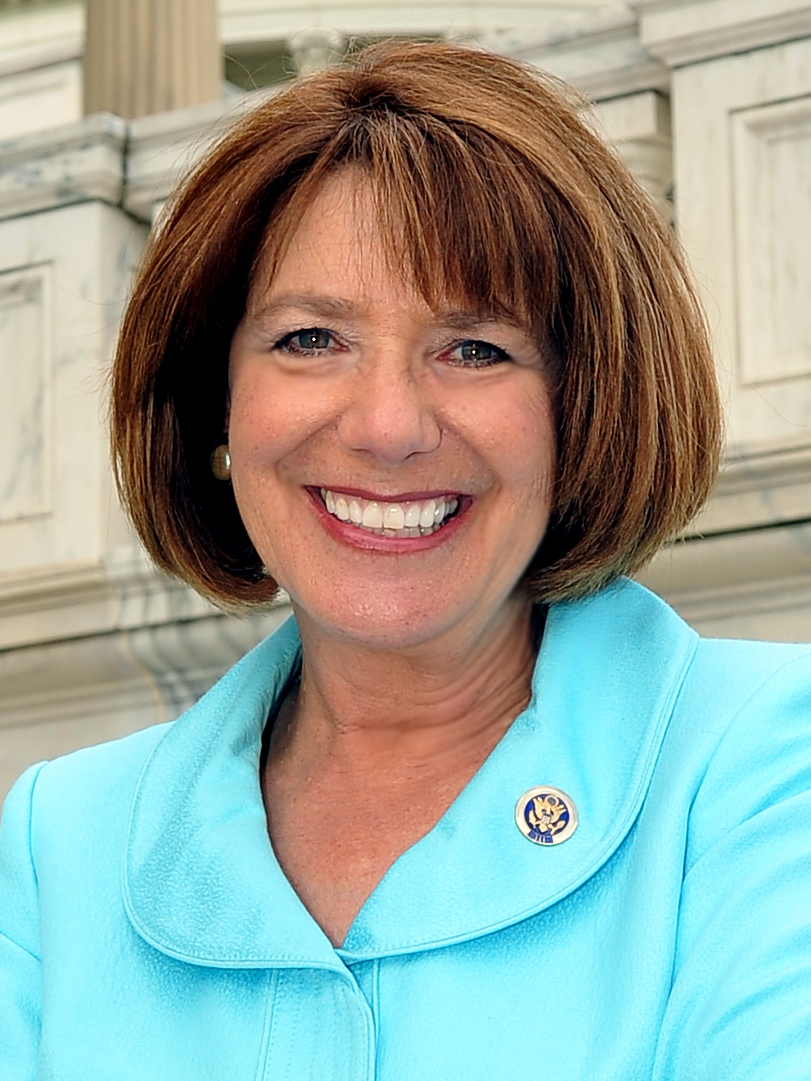

Nominee	Susan Davis	Larry A. Wilske
Party	Democratic	Republican
Popular vote	87,104	60,940
Percentage	58.8%	41.2%
- County results Davis: 50–60%
U.S. Representative before election
Susan Davis
Democratic
Elected U.S. Representative
Susan Davis
Democratic

The 53rd district is based in Central San Diego and includes La Mesa and Lemon Grove. Incumbent Democrat Susan Davis, who had represented the 53rd district since 2013 and previously represented the 49th district from 2001 to 2003, ran for re-election.

=== Primary election ===
==== Democratic candidates ====
===== Advanced to general =====
- Susan Davis, incumbent U.S. representative

==== Republican candidates ====
===== Advanced to general =====
- Larry Wilske, retired Navy SEAL

===== Eliminated in primary =====
- John Edwards, retired aerospace engineer
- Joel Marchese, teacher
- Jim Stieringer, school board member
- Wayne True, family physician

==== Results ====
Nonpartisan blanket primary results
Party	Candidate	Votes	%
Democratic	Susan Davis (incumbent)	50,041	56.3
Republican	Larry A. Wilske	18,384	20.7
Republican	Wayne S. True	9,182	10.3
Republican	John R. Edwards	3,986	4.5
Republican	Joel Marchese	2,729	3.1
Republican	Jim Stieringer	2,106	2.4
No party preference	John W. Campbell	1,596	1.8
No party preference	Christina Bobb	929	1.0
Total votes		88,953	100.0

=== General election ===
==== Predictions ====
Source	Ranking	As of
The Cook Political Report	Safe D	November 3, 2014
Rothenberg	Safe D	October 24, 2014
Sabato's Crystal Ball	Safe D	October 30, 2014
RCP	Safe D	November 2, 2014
Daily Kos Elections	Safe D	November 4, 2014

==== Results ====
California's 53rd congressional district election, 2014
Party	Candidate	Votes	%
Democratic	Susan Davis (incumbent)	87,104	58.8
Republican	Larry A. Wilske	60,940	41.2
Total votes		148,044	100.0
Democratic hold			

== See also ==
- 2014 United States House of Representatives elections
- 2014 United States elections

Official campaign websites
- District 25
  - Steve Knight campaign website
  - Lee Rogers campaign website
  - Tony Strickland campaign website
  - Evan Thomas campaign website
- District 31
  - Pete Aguilar campaign website
  - Joe Baca campaign website
  - Paul Chabot campaign website
  - Lesli Gooch campaign website
  - Eloise Gomez Reyes campaign website
  - Danny Tillman campaign website
- District 33
  - Elan Carr campaign website
  - Wendy Greuel campaign website
  - Ted Lieu campaign website
  - David Kanuth campaign website
  - Matt Miller campaign website
  - Barbara Mulvaney campaign website
  - Brent Roske campaign website
  - Marianne Williamson campaign website
- District 35
  - Christina Gagnier campaign website
  - Norma Torres campaign website
