= Torristas and Molinistas =

Political feud in Los Angeles

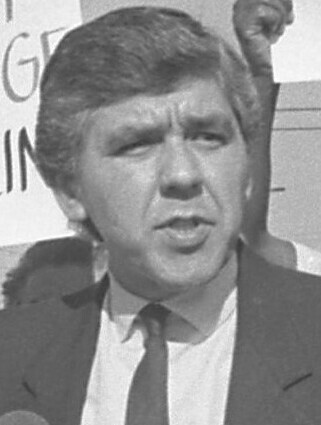
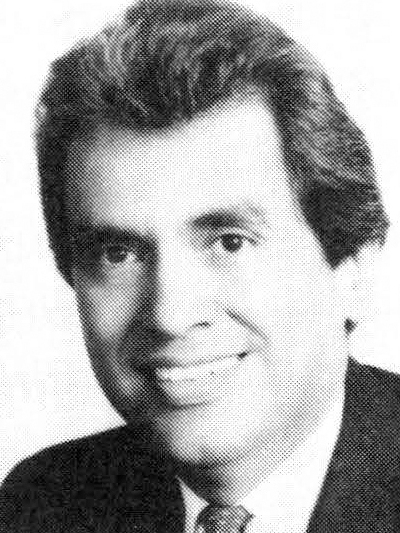
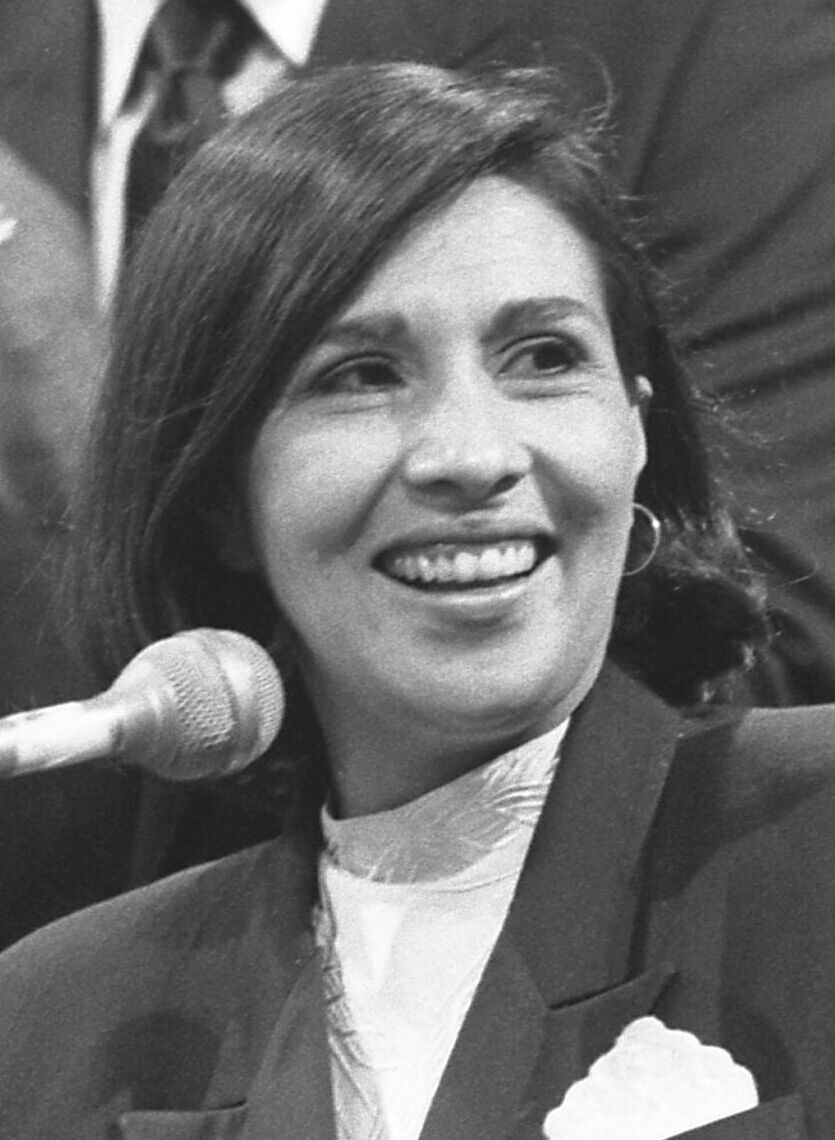
- Art Torres in 1986 Richard Alatorre in 1986 Gloria Molina in 1987
- Date: 1982–2005
- Caused by: Decision by Molina to run against Richard Polanco in the 1982 State Assembly election

Parties
| Torristas; Art Torres; Richard Alatorre | Molinistas; Gloria Molina |

The Torristas and Molinistas were groups involved a political feud in Los Angeles, California, in the latter part of the 20th century. Derived from the names of the three main leaders of the two camps, the term is similar to the Montagues and Capulets or the Hatfields and McCoys. The feud, concentrated in Eastside Los Angeles, began with the election of Art Torres and Richard Alatorre, whose supporters were called "Torristas." Gloria Molina's supporters, known as "Molinistas," clashed with the Torristas.

The rivalry between the politicians began after the 1981 redistricting, when Gloria Molina, then an aide, ran against Richard Polanco in the 1982 State Assembly election. Polanco was part of a group of Latino candidates, including Richard Alatorre and Art Torres, aiming to promote Latino politicians. This competition sparked a rivalry that extended to other races and the Los Angeles City Council, where Molina and Alatorre both served. The rivalry continued until the early 2000s, when the influence of both factions diminished as newer Latino politicians emerged.

== Background ==
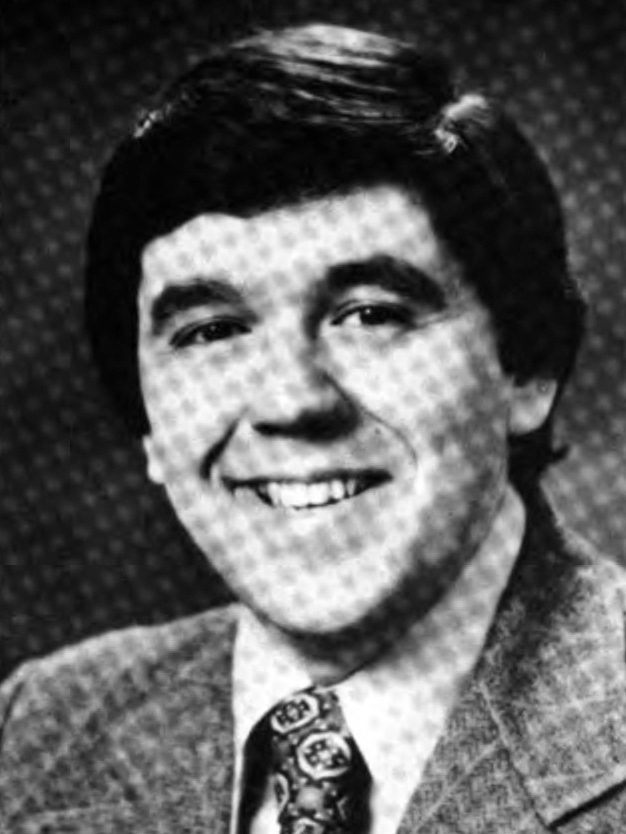
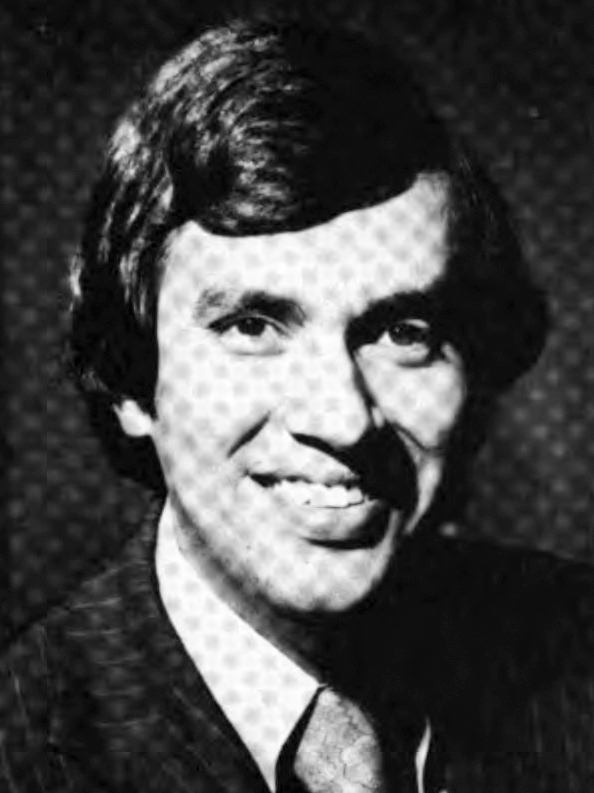
Art Torres and Richard Alatorre in 1975 while in the California State Assembly. The two would be the co-architects of the Eastside political machine.

Eastside Los Angeles generally refers to neighborhoods east of the Los Angeles River that are predominantly Mexican American, including the neighborhoods Boyle Heights, El Sereno, and Lincoln Heights. The area was predominantly Mexican American, but had little elected representation in any legislature. In 1949, a coalition of Black, Jewish and Latino voters elected Mexican-American Ed Roybal to the Los Angeles City Council with support from the Community Service Organization. The district Roybal represented, the 9th district, spanned from the Eastside down to South Los Angeles. After winning an election to become a U.S. Representative, Roybal supported the appointment of Gilbert W. Lindsay, an African-American, to his seat, although he previously requested that there be a special election.

By the 1970s, Mexican Americans had started being elected to the State Legislatures, with Alex P. Garcia being the first from Los Angeles in 1968. Two more Mexican American men from Los Angeles were elected to the California State Assembly: Richard Alatorre to the 48th district in 1972 and Art Torres to the 56th district in 1974. This gave the two men a power base in Eastside and Latino politics in Los Angeles, and they would become co-architects of the Eastside political machine.

== Feud ==
=== California State Legislature ===
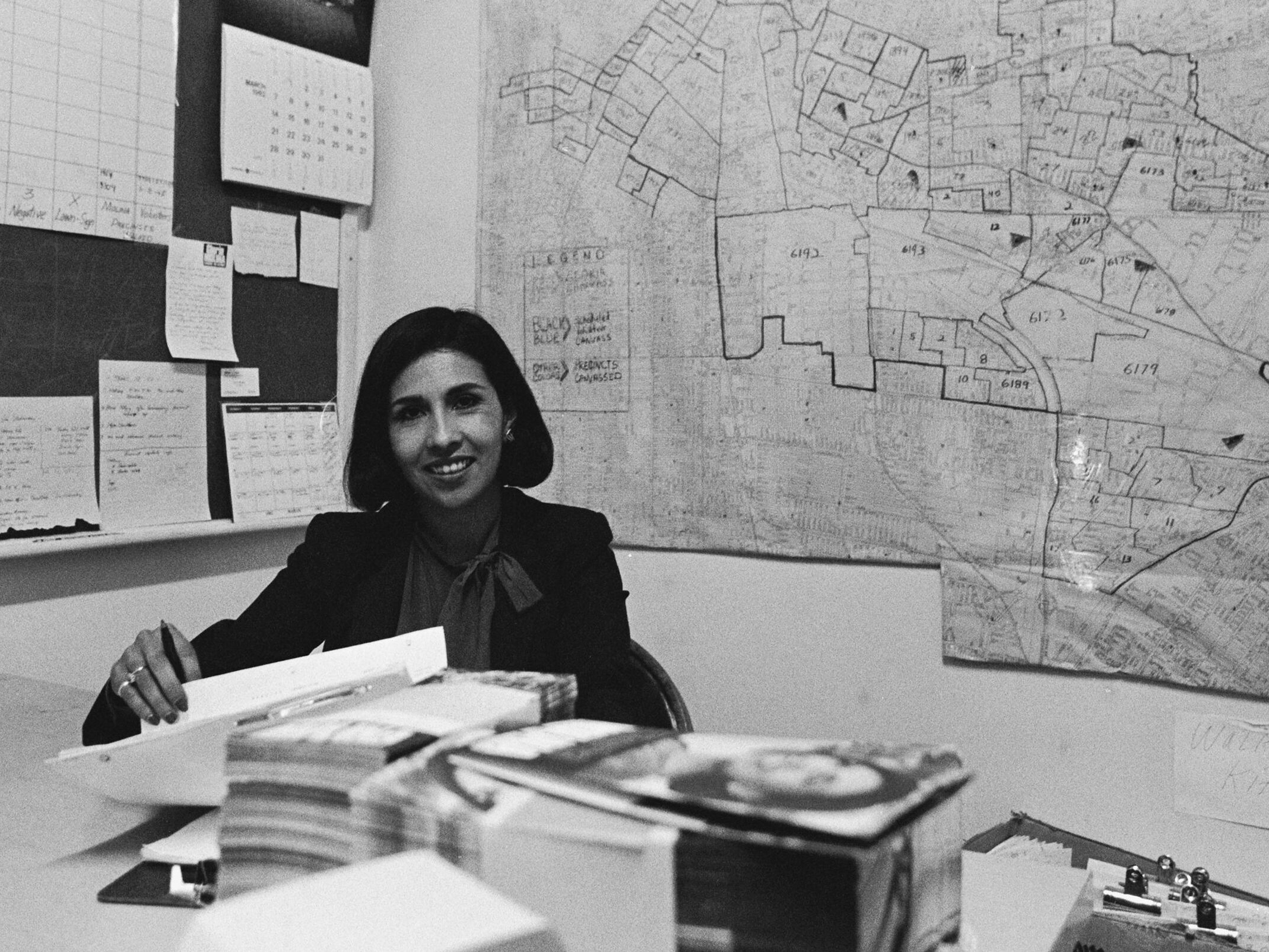
Molina in 1982. Her decision to run for the Assembly against Richard Polanco would cause the feud to start.

In 1981, the districts of the California State Assembly were reapportioned based on the 1980 United States census, with the 56th State Assembly district being redrawn. In November 1982, Latino candidates held a closed-door meeting to decide who would run for the seats. It was decided that Assemblymember Art Torres would run for the 24th State Senate district against Alex P. Garcia, Richard Polanco would run for the 56th Assembly seat vacated by Torres, and Assemblymember Matthew G. Martínez and former UNESCO ambassador Esteban Torres would run in two congressional districts. Gloria Molina, a former aide to Torres, Assembly Speaker Willie Brown, and President Jimmy Carter, approached Torres and Alatorre about running in the 56th Assembly District. Torres encouraged Molina to run for the assembly seat that he occupied. However, she was told that Polanco was the chosen candidate and that she should not run. Molina decided to run anyway, defeating Polanco in the Democratic primary and winning the seat. This victory established her own power base and created a path for other Chicanas to follow, but also created a rift between her and the Eastside politicos. Supporters of Art Torres and Richard Alatorre, part of the Eastside political machine, called themselves Torristas and were described as favoring "expensive suits, blunt words, fancy dinners, and backroom deals." Supporters of Gloria Molina, known as Molinistas, were characterized as "pragmatic do-gooders" who "believed in people power above caciques."

=== Los Angeles City Council ===
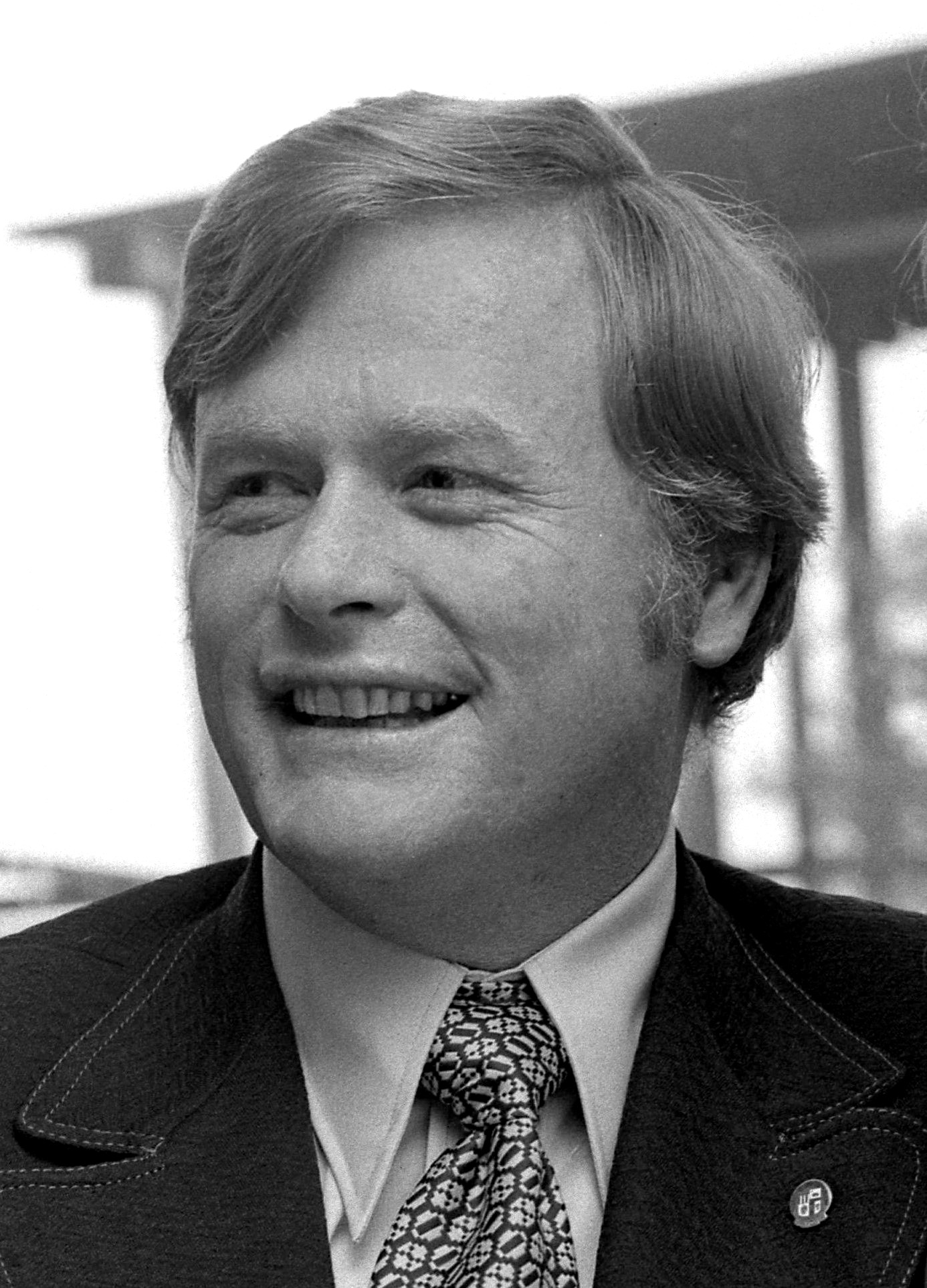
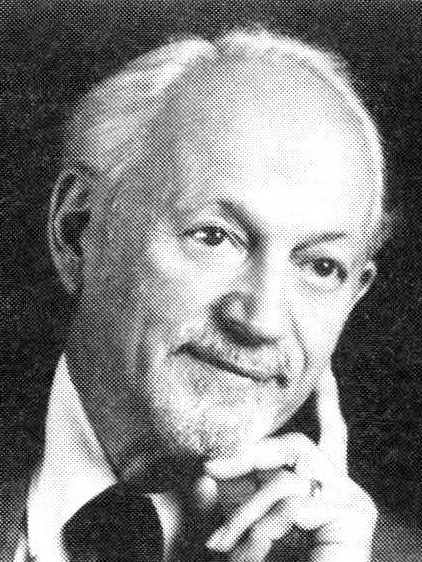
The resignation of Arthur K. Snyder (left) and the death of Howard Finn (right) would lead to Alatorre and Molina to be elected to the City Council.

Since Roybal's departure in 1962, there had been no other Latino members on the Los Angeles City Council. In 1983, Arthur K. Snyder was nearly forced into a runoff by Steve Rodriguez. Despite losing, Rodriguez's challenge highlighted weaknesses in Latino politics, as Torres and Roybal both endorsed Snyder, citing Rodriguez's lack of Democratic Party credentials. Rodriguez later led a recall against Snyder the next year, and although Snyder survived, he resigned in 1985. In 1985, Richard Alatorre won the 14th district seat, ending the absence of Latino council members and marking a political shift.

That same year, the Reagan administration sued the city for violating the 14th and 15th Amendments by limiting Latino representation on the City Council. In response, the city, led by Alatorre, proposed adding two Latino seats, but Mayor Tom Bradley vetoed the plan. Another opportunity for a Latino-centric district arose with the death of 1st district councilman Howard Finn, with the district redrawn to encompass the Eastside area. Molina ran in a special election to replace him, winning and taking office on February 3, 1987, giving the City Council two Latino council members. While on the council, Molina feuded with Alatorre before Molina was elected to the Los Angeles Board of Supervisors in 1991. Alatorre stayed in the City Council until 1999. That year, Molina and Alatorre endorsed two separate candidates for the 7th district, with Molina supporting Corinne Sanchez and Alatorre endorsing Alex Padilla.

=== Other races ===
In 1990, Los Angeles County Supervisor Peter F. Schabarum of the 1st district decided to retire, with a court ruling ordering the districts to be redrawn to create a majority Latino district. The next year, Molina and Torres both decided to run for Los Angeles County Supervisor, with both of them placing in the primary and going into a head-to-head runoff. Although Torres was endorsed by Tom Bradley, Molina defeated Torres, making her the first woman and first Latina supervisor elected to the board.

In 1992, state assemblymember Xavier Becerra ran for Roybal's seat in the 25th congressional district following Roybal's retirement. Endorsed by Molina, Becerra defeated Los Angeles Board of Education member Leticia Quezada, who was supported by Torres. Observers saw this as another proxy war in the ongoing feud between the Torristas and Molinistas. The next year, Antonio Villaraigosa, a representative on the Metro Board of Directors appointed by Molina, won an assembly seat in the 45th district. In June 1994, Molina endorsed state assemblymember Burt M. Margolin against Art Torres in their race for Insurance Commissioner. The ensuing campaign was described by the Los Angeles Times as mudslinging, with article author George Ramos stating, "Politics may be politics, but these folks need to grow up."

In the 2001 race for Mayor of Los Angeles, the internecine nature of the feud became evident as Becerra and Villaraigosa, both products of the rival factions, competed to advance in the primary. During the race, a phone advertisement supporting Becerra featured a woman posing as Gloria Molina and criticized Villaraigosa's record on crime. Although Becerra denied involvement, Molina expressed that she felt "personally abused and personally hurt" by the ad. Many Latino politicians, including Lucille Roybal-Allard, Nick Pacheco, and Alex Padilla, aligned themselves against Villaraigosa during his first run. In the 2005 mayoral race, Villaraigosa secured the endorsement of Alatorre, which helped him gain broader support within the Latino community.

== Aftermath and legacy ==
The rivalry eventually faded as new figures emerged in the Eastside political scene, such as Rocky Delgadillo, who became Los Angeles City Attorney in 2001, and José Huizar, who succeeded Antonio Villaraigosa on the City Council. According to Gustavo Arellano of the Los Angeles Times, the last prominent figures from that era were Hilda Solis (who later became the U.S. Secretary of Labor) and Xavier Becerra (who later became the U.S. Secretary of Health and Human Services). In 2024, the feud resurfaced amidst various scandals involving the Los Angeles City Council. This included the arrest of Huizar in 2020 and an audio leak that implicated councilmembers Gil Cedillo of the 1st district and Kevin de León of the 14th district.

== See also ==
- Politics of Los Angeles County
- Brown Berets
- Chicano Moratorium
- History of Mexican Americans in Los Angeles
