= Lloyd Monserratt =

American activist (1966–2003)

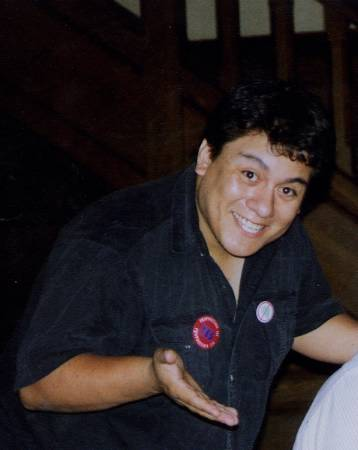
- Lloyd Monserratt circa 1999
- Born: December 2, 1966; Los Angeles, California, US
- Died: January 9, 2003 (aged 36); Torrance, California, US
- Education: BA, UCLA
- Employer: Los Angeles City Council
- Political party: Democrat
- Partner: Michelle Ramos

Lloyd Monserratt (December 2, 1966 – January 9, 2003), was an American political activist and Director of Constituent Services for the National Association of Latino Elected and Appointed Officials, where he trained a number of future Latino politicians. While studying at the University of California, Los Angeles (UCLA) in 1988, he was elected student council president. When he was subsequently ruled ineligible to hold office, the resulting campus unrest and demonstrations made national headlines and led to charges of endemic racial discrimination at the California public university. At the time of his death, Monserratt was chief-of-staff for Los Angeles City Councilmember Nick Pacheco.

== Early life ==
Monserratt was born in Los Angeles, California, the eldest son of Ecuadorian immigrants Carlos and Olga Monserratt. His father was an architect and named his eldest son after Frank Lloyd Wright. He graduated with honors from Saint Francis High School in La Cañada. He was an Eagle Scout. At age 9 his father brought him along to protest the opening of the El Cid adult bookstore on Main Street in the San Gabriel Valley city of Alhambra. The store was eventually forced to close by the continuing presence of the protestors led by the Catholic League from the local parish.

== Student leadership at UCLA ==
During his years at UCLA, Monserratt was extensively involved with the Undergraduate Student Association Council (USAC) of ASUCLA. Leading a coalition of minority students, he was elected president of USAC in 1988. The 1988 campaign pitted the coalition of minority students, the Third World Coalition, against the candidates put forth by members of Greek system.

After the election, he was declared ineligible due to a dispute over his academic qualifications and denied office. Prior to the election, the student Election Board had approved the applications of all candidates for president, certifying that they met the academic requirements among other things. Days after the election, the USAC members who had endorsed Monserratt's opponents voted to overrule the Election Board, applying their own eligibility criteria retroactively. They were accused by many of subverting student democracy and taking through legislation what they had failed to win in the student vote.

After USAC ex post facto declared Monserratt ineligible, the Third World Coalition sought to put forth a new candidate in his place. However, this was not permitted by the USAC. Thus, the election to replace Monserratt was between Mike Meehan and Mike Soules (who had already lost in the primary and endorsed Mike Meehan), with Meehan eventually winning.

Some students viewed the move as racially motivated, and a group of about 200, most of them members of minority groups, marched on the polling places after a heated rally protesting the disqualification. A near riot ensued when candidates from the Third World Coalition slate protested the disqualification of their presidential candidate. The election was appealed through the internal student government appellate process, and the school administration, where Monserratt's ineligibility was affirmed.

At the time, Monserratt said he did not condone the violence and had left before it erupted. "This event was being used as an outlet for (student) frustrations," over racial problems, Monserratt said, "We have not seen a real commitment (from the University of California) to diversify our faculty, our programs, our administration."

California State Senator Art Torres, chairman of a special Senate committee on UC admissions, said the UCLA's administration was partly responsible for the troubles by not making minority students feel welcome on campus and that the election melee, while unfortunate, "was merely a catalyst for what was brewing underneath." In the fall of 1988, Torres held a hearing about racial tensions at UCLA, a series of racial incidents on that campus and on the UC's plans to ease the tensions.

After a change of control two years later, Monserratt's election victory was certified by the student government. Though he did not serve, Monserratt is remembered as one of the few Latino undergraduate presidents in UCLA history. His picture currently hangs in the student body president's office along with the other elected presidents of the UCLA student government.

== Political ==
Monserratt honed the political organizing skills learned at UCLA by working for many California political campaigns. He used his experience to train future Latino politicians while serving as the Director of Constituent Services for the National Association of Latino Elected and Appointed Officials. A noted campaign manager, House minority leader Richard Gephardt once asked Monserratt to help with several close congressional races in California and Nevada. With Monserratt's help all six of the Democrats were elected. His personal style was to work behind the scenes supporting and influencing candidates and issues. He worked with the Texas Senate campaign of Victor Morales. Though Morales lost, his effort was an important moment for the Hispanic community. Analyzing the campaign's effects, Monserratt told the Associated Press, "It's just rejuvenated the community, paving the way for future candidates ... there's a lot of excitement because of what he was able to do".

After helping Vickie Castro win a seat on the Los Angeles Board of Education in 1993, he went on to serve as her chief of staff. Monserratt was involved in local Los Angeles politics. Candidates running for office he advised included Art Chacon, Lucia Rivera, Jocelyn Yap, Janice Hahn, and the failed mayoral bid by Xavier Becerra. In 1999, he managed the Los Angeles City Council campaign of Nick Pacheco to victory.

In 2001, while on leave from Pacheco's office to run the campaign of Ed Reyes for 1st District seat of the city council, Monserratt was involved in a campaign scandal. Monserratt ran the phone-bank computers contracted to the mayoral campaign of Xavier Becerra. The campaign ran a tape of someone impersonating Gloria Molina disparaging the voting record of mayoral candidate Antonio Villaraigosa. Though no laws had been broken, this action tarnished the reputations of all involved.

== Community action ==
Believing in the concept of direct action, Monserratt was known for working tirelessly as a community builder. He created the Parents Institute while Chief of Staff to LAUSD Board Member Vicki Castro, and Los Angeles' "Bulky Item drop off centers." He once said, "I believe in public service. It helps ground my principles and organize how I live my life.

He had already become a legend, at the age of 36, throughout the greater Eastside of the city of Los Angeles and throughout the Latino community statewide," said Council President Alex Padilla. "I don't think he had an equal."

"He was a tremendous leader and motivator of people," said David Hoffman, who was USAC president during the 1988 election and was a close friend of Monserratt. When Hispanic students were criticized for waving Mexican flags during demonstrations in Los Angeles in 1994, Monserratt responded to the controversy by saying that it was "a symbolic clinging to self-pride".

== Death ==
Monserratt was serving as chief-of-staff for Los Angeles City Councilmember Nick Pacheco at the time of his death. His death sent a shock through the California Democratic circles. His fiancée said that he died of medical errors and undetected infection three days after an elective surgery.

Monserratt's fiancée said that his surgeon had a record of substance abuse and other major mistakes. This led his friends and family to start a campaign to create more physician accountability and transparency. In 2008, SB-1441 Healing arts practitioners: substance abuse was signed into law.

== Memorials ==
- El Sereno Branch Library (in memory of Lloyd Monserratt)
- Lloyd Monserratt Pleasant House, Jovenes, Inc.- Providing emergency shelter to homeless, immigrant youth.
- "Evergreen Cemetery jogging path ~ Boyle Heights". LA Eastside. January 30, 2009. "Evergreen Cemetery jogging path, Dedicated to Lloyd Monserratt: Nick Pacheco, Dedicated June 26, 2003; José Huizar, Councilmember 14th District, Rededicated January 12, 2008; Thanks to Public Works, Bureau of Street Services"
- Lloyd Monserratt Young Leaders Memorial Fund

== See also ==
- List of notable UCLA alumni
- List of notable Eagle Scouts
