= 2006 Los Angeles County Board of Supervisors election =

2006 Los Angeles County Board of Supervisors elections

3 of the 5 seats of the Los Angeles County Board of Supervisors
	Majority party	Minority party
Party	Democratic	Republican
Seats before	3	2
Seats won	2	0
Seats after	3	2
Seat change	Steady	Steady

The 2006 Los Angeles County Board of Supervisors elections were held on June 6, 2006, coinciding with the California gubernatorial election, 2006. Two of the five seats (for the First and Third Districts) of the Los Angeles County Board of Supervisors were contested in this election. None of the incumbents were termed out.

== Results ==
=== First District ===
2006 Los Angeles County Board of Supervisors election District 1

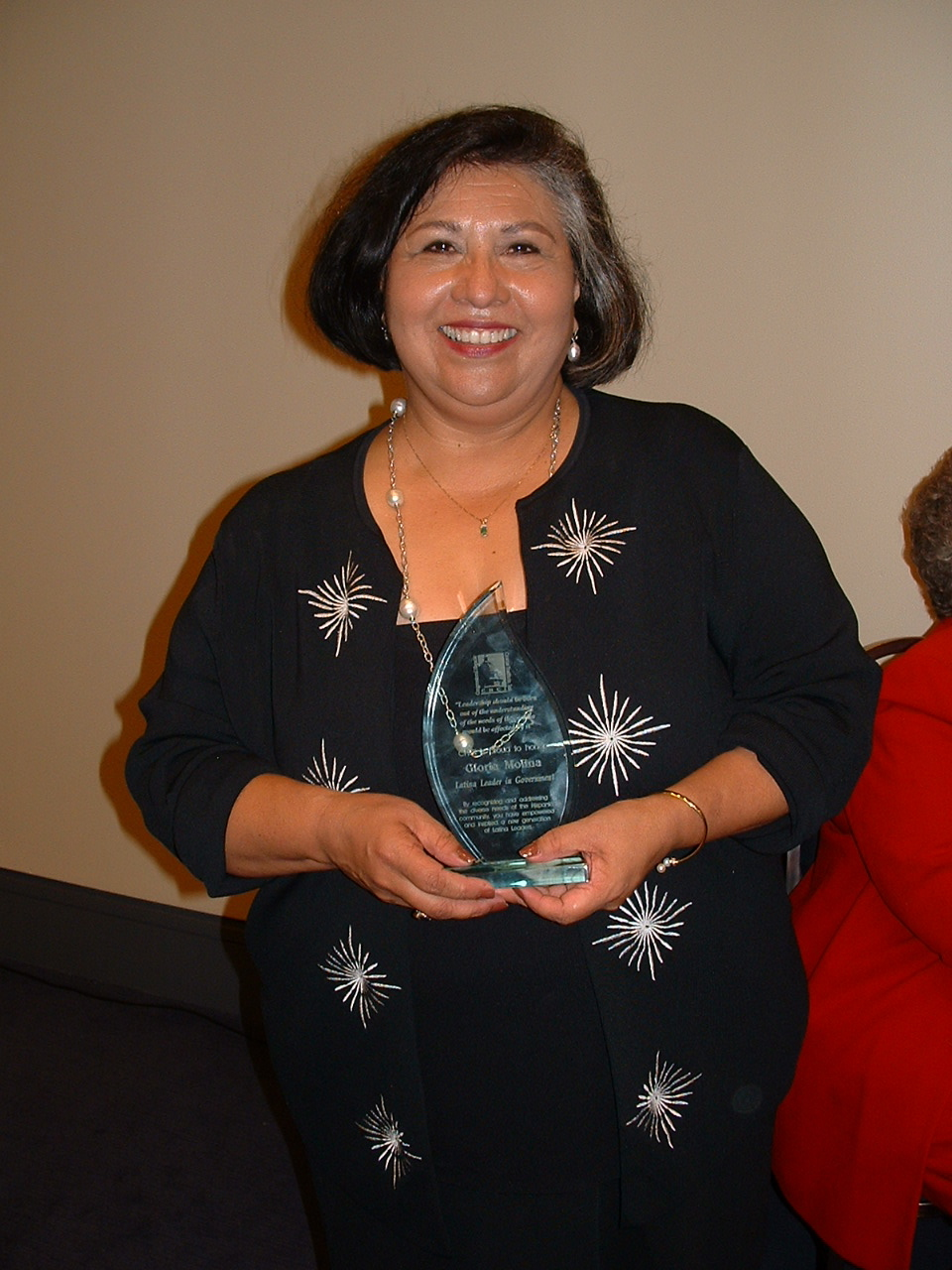

Candidate	Gloria Molina	David Sanchez
Popular vote	130,486	16,270
Percentage	70.49%	13.57%
Candidate	Andrew Ahlering	Carlos A Leyva
Popular vote	13,703	9,366
Percentage	11.43%	7.81%
Supervisor before election
Gloria Molina
Supervisor
Gloria Molina

1st District supervisorial election, 2006
Candidate	Votes	%
Gloria Molina (incumbent)	80,574	67.19
David Sanchez	16,270	13.57
Andrew Ahlering	13,703	11.43
Carlos A Leyva	9,366	7.81
Turnout	{{{votes}}}	21.69%%
Total votes	119,913	100.00

=== Third District ===
2006 Los Angeles County Board of Supervisors election District 3

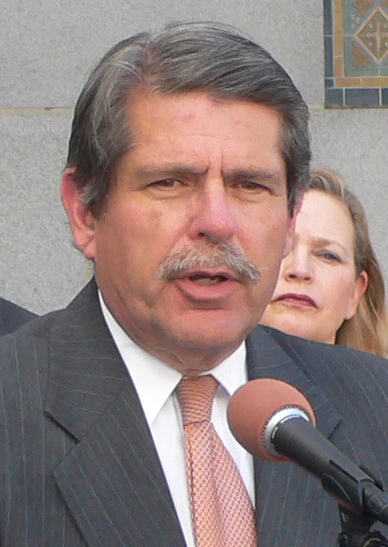

Candidate	Zev Yaroslavsky	Randy Springer
Popular vote	130,486	27,988
Percentage	70.49%	15.12%
Candidate	David R Hernandez
Popular vote	26,626
Percentage	14.38%
Supervisor before election
Zev Yaroslavsky
Supervisor
Zev Yaroslavsky

3rd District supervisorial election, 2006
Candidate	Votes	%
Zev Yaroslavsky (incumbent)	130,486	70.49
Randy Springer	27,988	15.12
David R Hernandez	26,626	14.38
Turnout	{{{votes}}}	21.98%%
Total votes	185,100	100.00
