= Politics of Los Angeles County =

The politics of Los Angeles County leans Democratic. Los Angeles County has voted Democratic in every Presidential election since 1988, with every Democratic nominee winning the county by a margin of at least 25 points since 1992. Los Angeles County has voted for the Democratic candidate in most of the presidential elections in the past four decades, although it did vote twice for Dwight Eisenhower (1952, 1956), Richard Nixon (1968, 1972), and Ronald Reagan (1980, 1984), the latter two of whom were Californians. From 1920 to 1984 it could be considered as a reliable bellwether county which always voted for the eventual national winner. Los Angeles went against the overall national picture in 1988, 2000, 2004, 2016, and 2024.

Northern Los Angeles County, which includes the cities of Santa Clarita, Lancaster, and Palmdale, has historically been a Republican stronghold, but has been shifting Democratic in recent elections. All three cities voted for Hillary Clinton in 2016 and Joe Biden in 2020. The region is represented in the House of Representatives by Democrat George Whitesides and Republican Jay Obernolte. The region currently leans Democratic in presidential elections, but less so than the rest of the county.

United States presidential election results for Los Angeles County, California
Year	Republican / Whig		Democratic		Third party(ies)	
Year	No.	%	No.	%	No.	%
1852	497	46.41%	574	53.59%	0	0.00%
1856	521	37.84%	721	52.36%	135	9.80%
1860	356	20.27%	703	40.03%	697	39.69%
1864	555	42.73%	744	57.27%	0	0.00%
1868	748	37.70%	1,236	62.30%	0	0.00%
1872	1,312	51.11%	1,228	47.84%	27	1.05%
1876	3,042	45.69%	3,616	54.31%	0	0.00%
1880	2,914	47.90%	2,853	46.90%	316	5.19%
1884	5,595	51.67%	4,683	43.24%	551	5.09%
1888	13,805	54.64%	10,110	40.02%	1,349	5.34%
1892	10,226	44.89%	8,119	35.64%	4,434	19.47%
1896	16,891	49.62%	16,043	47.13%	1,108	3.25%
1900	19,200	55.10%	13,158	37.76%	2,490	7.15%
1904	32,507	66.50%	10,030	20.52%	6,346	12.98%
1908	41,483	56.77%	22,076	30.21%	9,518	13.02%
1912	2,181	1.32%	55,110	33.34%	108,005	65.34%
1916	135,554	50.59%	114,070	42.58%	18,297	6.83%
1920	178,117	69.10%	55,661	21.59%	23,992	9.31%
1924	299,675	65.51%	33,554	7.33%	124,228	27.16%
1928	513,526	70.22%	209,945	28.71%	7,830	1.07%
1932	373,738	38.55%	554,476	57.19%	41,380	4.27%
1936	357,401	31.62%	757,351	67.00%	15,663	1.39%
1940	574,266	40.58%	822,718	58.13%	18,285	1.29%
1944	666,441	42.68%	886,252	56.75%	8,871	0.57%
1948	804,232	46.51%	812,690	47.00%	112,160	6.49%
1952	1,278,407	56.21%	971,408	42.71%	24,725	1.09%
1956	1,260,206	55.38%	1,007,887	44.29%	7,331	0.32%
1960	1,302,661	49.45%	1,323,818	50.25%	8,020	0.30%
1964	1,161,067	42.52%	1,568,300	57.43%	1,551	0.06%
1968	1,266,480	47.65%	1,223,251	46.02%	168,251	6.33%
1972	1,549,717	54.75%	1,189,977	42.04%	90,676	3.20%
1976	1,174,926	47.78%	1,221,893	49.69%	62,258	2.53%
1980	1,224,533	50.18%	979,830	40.15%	235,822	9.66%
1984	1,424,113	54.50%	1,158,912	44.35%	29,889	1.14%
1988	1,239,716	46.88%	1,372,352	51.89%	32,603	1.23%
1992	799,607	29.04%	1,446,529	52.54%	507,267	18.42%
1996	746,544	30.96%	1,430,629	59.34%	233,841	9.70%
2000	871,930	32.35%	1,710,505	63.47%	112,719	4.18%
2004	1,076,225	35.60%	1,907,736	63.10%	39,319	1.30%
2008	956,425	28.82%	2,295,853	69.19%	65,970	1.99%
2012	885,333	27.83%	2,216,903	69.69%	78,831	2.48%
2016	769,743	22.41%	2,464,364	71.76%	200,201	5.83%
2020	1,145,530	26.74%	3,028,885	70.70%	109,530	2.56%
2024	1,189,862	31.91%	2,417,109	64.82%	122,118	3.27%

== Voter registration statistics ==
Population and registered voters
Total population	10,014,009	
Registered voters	5,745,214	86.3%
Democratic	2,994,715	52.1%
Republican	1,056,154	18.4%
Democratic–Republican spread	+1,938,561	+33.7%
American Independent	186,676	3.3%
Green	27,222	0.4%
Libertarian	48,319	0.8%
Peace and Freedom	42,069	0.7%
Unknown	35,995	0.6%
Other	50,721	0.9%
No party preference	1,303,343	22.7%

== Legislative districts ==
In the United States House of Representatives, Los Angeles County is divided among 17 congressional districts:

- California's 23rd congressional district, represented by Republican Jay Obernolte
- California's 26th congressional district, represented by Democrat Julia Brownley
- California's 27th congressional district, represented by Democrat George T. Whitesides
- California's 28th congressional district, represented by Democrat Judy Chu
- California's 29th congressional district, represented by Democrat Luz Rivas
- California's 30th congressional district, represented by Democrat Laura Friedman
- California's 31st congressional district, represented by Democrat Gil Cisneros
- California's 32nd congressional district, represented by Democrat Brad Sherman
- California's 34th congressional district, represented by Democrat Jimmy Gomez
- California's 35th congressional district, represented by Democrat Norma Torres
- California's 36th congressional district, represented by Democrat Ted Lieu
- California's 37th congressional district, represented by Democrat Sydney Kamlager-Dove
- California's 38th congressional district, represented by Democrat Linda Sánchez
- California's 42nd congressional district, represented by Democrat Robert Garcia
- California's 43rd congressional district, represented by Democrat Maxine Waters
- California's 44th congressional district, represented by Democrat Nanette Barragán and
- California's 45th congressional district, represented by Democrat Derek Tran.

In the California State Senate, Los Angeles County is divided among 13 legislative districts:

- the 20th senatorial district, represented by Democrat Caroline Menjivar,
- the 22nd senatorial district, represented by Democrat Susan Rubio,
- the 23rd senatorial district, represented by Republican Suzette Martinez Valladares,
- the 24th senatorial district, represented by Democrat Ben Allen,
- the 25th senatorial district, represented by Democrat Sasha Renée Pérez,
- the 26th senatorial district, represented by Democrat María Elena Durazo,
- the 27th senatorial district, represented by Democrat Henry Stern,
- the 28th senatorial district, represented by Democrat Lola Smallwood-Cuevas,
- the 30th senatorial district, represented by Democrat Bob Archuleta,
- the 33rd senatorial district, represented by Democrat Lena Gonzalez,
- the 34th senatorial district, represented by Democrat Tom Umberg,
- the 35th senatorial district, represented by Democrat Laura Richardson, and
- the 36th senatorial district, represented by Republican Tony Strickland.

In the California State Assembly, Los Angeles County is divided among 24 legislative districts:

- the 34th Assembly district, represented by Republican Tom Lackey,
- the 39th Assembly district, represented by Democrat Juan Carrillo,
- the 40th Assembly district, represented by Democrat Pilar Schiavo,
- the 41st Assembly district, represented by Democrat John Harabedian,
- the 42nd Assembly district, represented by Democrat Jacqui Irwin,
- the 43rd Assembly district, represented by Democrat Celeste Rodriguez,
- the 44th Assembly district, represented by Democrat Nick Schultz,
- the 46th Assembly district, represented by Democrat Jesse Gabriel,
- the 48th Assembly district, represented by Democrat Blanca Rubio,
- the 49th Assembly district, represented by Democrat Mike Fong,
- the 51st Assembly district, represented by Democrat Rick Zbur,
- the 52nd Assembly district, represented by Democrat Jessica Caloza,
- the 53rd Assembly district, represented by Democrat Michelle Rodriguez,
- the 54th Assembly district, represented by Democrat Mark Gonzalez,
- the 55th Assembly district, represented by Democrat Isaac Bryan,
- the 56th Assembly district, represented by Democrat Lisa Calderon,
- the 57th Assembly district, represented by Democrat Sade Elhawary,
- the 61st Assembly district, represented by Democrat Tina McKinnor,
- the 62nd Assembly district, represented by Democrat Jose Solache,
- the 64th Assembly district, represented by Democrat Blanca Pacheco,
- the 65th Assembly district, represented by Democrat Mike Gipson,
- the 66th Assembly district, represented by Democrat Al Muratsuchi,
- the 67th Assembly district, represented by Democrat Sharon Quirk-Silva, and
- the 69th Assembly district, represented by Democrat Josh Lowenthal.

On November 4, 2008, Los Angeles County was almost evenly split over Proposition 8 which amended the California Constitution to ban same-sex marriages. The county voted for the amendment 50.1% with a margin of 2,385 votes.

== Cities by population and voter registration ==
Cities by population and voter registration
City	Population	Registered voters (Note: Percentage of registered voters with respect to total population. Percentages of party members with respect to registered voters follow.)	Democratic	Republican	D–R spread	Other	No party preference
Agoura Hills	20,353	70.3%	40.1%	33.8%	+6.3%	11.5%	17.4%
Alhambra	83,301	45.4%	47.4%	19.1%	+28.3%	10.9%	24.4%
Arcadia	55,993	53.7%	28.4%	34.2%	-5.8%	10.1%	28.9%
Artesia	16,495	44.1%	46.9%	24.2%	+22.7%	9.8%	20.7%
Avalon	3,690	46.6%	38.7%	34.9%	+3.8%	12.0%	17.1%
Azusa	46,177	40.1%	46.8%	25.2%	+21.6%	11.9%	18.7%
Baldwin Park	75,441	38.9%	54.5%	17.0%	+37.5%	10.2%	20.2%
Bell	35,602	31.6%	61.7%	12.1%	+49.6%	9.2%	18.3%
Bell Gardens	42,294	30.6%	61.5%	11.2%	+50.3%	9.6%	19.4%
Bellflower	76,243	44.2%	51.5%	22.4%	+29.1%	11.4%	17.2%
Beverly Hills	34,042	66.0%	45.3%	24.7%	+20.6%	10.1%	21.8%
Bradbury	932	67.8%	24.5%	48.7%	-24.2%	8.1%	20.7%
Burbank	103,037	59.4%	44.2%	26.7%	+17.5%	12.5%	19.0%
Calabasas	22,839	67.8%	43.2%	31.0%	+12.2%	10.9%	17.2%
Carson	91,508	58.3%	60.7%	14.8%	+45.9%	8.5%	17.8%
Cerritos	49,281	64.8%	39.6%	28.5%	+11.1%	8.5%	25.0%
Claremont	34,824	66.0%	45.0%	30.4%	+14.6%	10.7%	16.0%
Commerce	12,791	49.0%	67.0%	11.0%	+56.0%	8.5%	15.0%
Compton	96,102	47.2%	73.0%	6.8%	+66.2%	9.2%	12.8%
Covina	47,662	53.6%	42.5%	32.5%	+10.0%	11.4%	16.4%
Cudahy	23,846	28.1%	61.9%	11.6%	+50.3%	9.7%	18.1%
Culver City	38,899	69.4%	57.0%	15.9%	+41.1%	11.2%	18.1%
Diamond Bar	55,668	58.0%	34.5%	31.7%	+2.8%	10.5%	25.5%
Downey	111,329	48.3%	50.1%	25.8%	+24.3%	10.3%	16.0%
Duarte	21,363	55.9%	47.6%	26.5%	+21.1%	9.9%	18.3%
El Monte	113,763	31.7%	50.9%	17.1%	+33.8%	11.1%	23.1%
El Segundo	16,597	68.8%	33.5%	37.3%	-3.8%	13.2%	18.9%
Gardena	58,743	51.8%	62.8%	15.5%	+47.3%	8.5%	15.0%
Glendale	192,069	50.6%	40.7%	27.5%	+13.2%	11.5%	22.6%
Glendora	50,000	63.6%	30.1%	46.0%	-15.9%	10.7%	16.1%
Hawaiian Gardens	14,309	32.2%	53.8%	17.0%	+36.8%	10.8%	20.6%
Hawthorne	84,293	42.8%	61.7%	13.3%	+48.4%	10.6%	16.4%
Hermosa Beach	19,422	70.4%	35.4%	32.5%	+2.9%	13.7%	20.9%
Hidden Hills	2,370	59.0%	38.7%	38.2%	+0.5%	9.8%	15.6%
Huntington Park	58,465	28.5%	64.1%	11.0%	+53.1%	9.4%	17.1%
Industry	518	19.7%	25.5%	53.9%	-28.4%	16.7%	9.8%
Inglewood	109,967	49.8%	74.1%	6.1%	+68.0%	8.6%	12.8%
Irwindale	1,525	61.0%	62.4%	15.5%	+46.9%	10.1%	15.0%
La Cañada Flintridge	20,248	73.2%	30.0%	46.1%	-16.1%	8.5%	17.2%
La Habra Heights	5,304	72.9%	23.1%	53.5%	-30.4%	9.8%	16.0%
La Mirada	48,363	57.0%	38.2%	37.9%	+0.3%	10.2%	16.3%
La Puente	39,957	39.5%	58.6%	15.9%	+42.7%	9.9%	17.5%
La Verne	31,139	66.5%	34.4%	43.0%	-8.6%	10.3%	14.9%
Lakewood	79,994	60.7%	44.5%	30.9%	+13.6%	10.9%	16.4%
Lancaster	152,678	46.0%	39.9%	35.4%	+4.5%	14.4%	14.2%
Lawndale	32,652	40.8%	54.0%	17.8%	+36.2%	11.5%	19.1%
Lomita	20,246	56.4%	41.8%	32.1%	+9.7%	11.6%	17.2%
Long Beach	462,197	54.2%	51.5%	21.1%	+30.4%	13.2%	16.6%
Los Angeles	3,782,544	48.0%	56.1%	15.9%	+40.2%	12.1%	18.0%
Lynwood	69,818	34.7%	66.5%	9.4%	+57.1%	9.4%	16.4%
Malibu	12,746	72.3%	42.2%	29.4%	+12.8%	11.9%	19.1%
Manhattan Beach	34,986	72.1%	35.8%	37.8%	-2.0%	11.0%	17.7%
Maywood	27,454	30.4%	62.3%	10.1%	+52.2%	9.1%	19.8%
Monrovia	36,622	56.9%	41.4%	32.2%	+9.2%	11.2%	17.7%
Montebello	62,470	47.1%	59.0%	16.7%	+42.3%	9.2%	16.7%
Monterey Park	60,251	46.3%	44.7%	19.0%	+25.7%	9.3%	28.5%
Norwalk	105,348	45.1%	54.3%	19.9%	+34.4%	10.1%	17.8%
Palmdale	149,001	45.2%	44.5%	30.6%	+13.9%	13.1%	15.2%
Palos Verdes Estates	13,412	77.1%	25.4%	51.6%	-26.2%	8.7%	16.4%
Paramount	54,196	36.4%	61.3%	13.5%	+47.8%	10.3%	16.8%
Pasadena	136,807	58.2%	49.7%	23.2%	+26.5%	11.5%	17.7%
Pico Rivera	63,004	51.5%	61.9%	15.8%	+46.1%	8.5%	15.4%
Pomona	148,946	39.3%	52.1%	20.2%	+31.9%	12.3%	17.6%
Rancho Palos Verdes	41,575	69.4%	31.7%	42.8%	-11.1%	9.1%	18.4%
Redondo Beach	66,397	66.6%	38.0%	31.4%	+6.6%	13.4%	19.8%
Rolling Hills	1,790	85.9%	19.3%	57.1%	-37.8%	10.2%	16.3%
Rolling Hills Estates	8,040	74.6%	28.1%	49.9%	-21.8%	8.2%	15.5%
Rosemead	53,725	38.5%	45.2%	17.4%	+27.8%	11.5%	28.2%
San Dimas	33,523	64.4%	34.2%	41.7%	-7.5%	11.0%	16.0%
San Fernando	23,638	38.6%	60.9%	12.5%	+48.4%	11.1%	17.2%
San Gabriel	39,703	41.8%	41.4%	22.8%	+18.6%	10.8%	26.8%
San Marino	13,131	67.9%	22.7%	42.1%	-19.4%	7.8%	28.9%
Santa Clarita	173,993	60.4%	33.7%	40.8%	-7.1%	12.1%	16.5%
Santa Fe Springs	16,333	58.5%	57.5%	20.5%	+37.0%	8.7%	15.3%
Santa Monica	89,153	72.9%	53.7%	15.4%	+38.3%	13.5%	19.6%
Sierra Madre	10,881	75.8%	38.0%	36.8%	+1.2%	11.0%	16.7%
Signal Hill	10,842	56.5%	50.7%	21.6%	+29.1%	12.9%	17.6%
South El Monte	20,197	35.7%	57.9%	13.4%	+44.5%	9.2%	21.4%
South Gate	94,586	37.7%	62.6%	12.5%	+50.1%	9.2%	17.3%
South Pasadena	25,465	65.4%	45.6%	24.1%	+21.5%	11.6%	20.8%
Temple City	35,372	50.7%	35.3%	28.4%	+6.9%	10.6%	27.7%
Torrance	144,622	58.2%	37.1%	35.5%	+1.6%	10.3%	19.3%
Vernon	112	69.6%	23.1%	32.1%	-9.0%	26.9%	23.1%
Walnut	29,269	62.2%	33.2%	28.0%	+5.2%	10.3%	30.3%
West Covina	105,810	51.0%	46.7%	25.9%	+20.8%	10.8%	18.9%
West Hollywood	34,564	76.3%	60.5%	9.9%	+50.6%	12.9%	18.8%
Westlake Village	8,276	77.3%	31.9%	42.1%	-10.2%	11.6%	16.8%
Whittier	85,161	54.2%	44.1%	33.2%	+10.9%	10.4%	14.8%

== See also ==
- Los Angeles County, California#Politics
