= Frank W. Mixter =

American politician

Frank W. Mixer
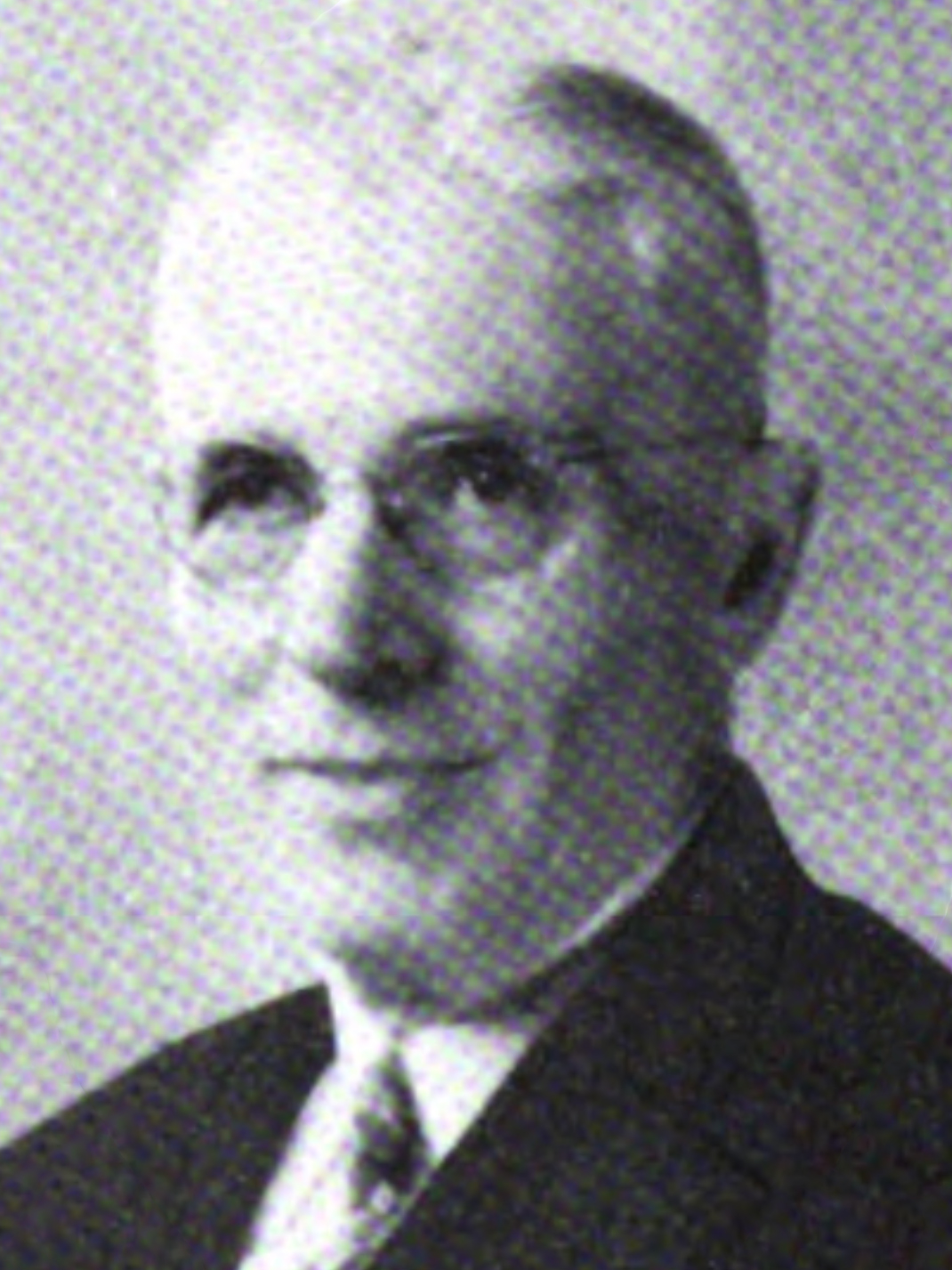

Member of the California Senate from the 32nd district
- In office January 5, 1931 - January 6, 1947
- Preceded by: James I. Wagy
- Succeeded by: J. Howard Williams

Member of the California State Assembly from the 55th district
- In office January 5, 1925 - January 5, 1931
- Preceded by: Charles W. Cleary
- Succeeded by: Milton M. Golden

Personal details
- Born: December 30, 1873 Pekin, Illinois
- Died: May 22, 1947 (aged 68) San Francisco
- Party: Republican
- Spouse: Olive Pogue (m. June 23, 1897)
- Children: 6

Frank W. Mixter (December 30, 1878 – May 22, 1947) served in the California State Assembly for the 55th district from 1925 to 1931 and the California State Senate for the 32nd district from 1931 to 1947.

== Early life ==
Mixter's father was a Civil War veteran. Born in Pekin, Illinois, his family moved around from Peoria, to St. Louis, to Paris, Texas and Hot Springs, Arkansas. He held various jobs before moving to Visalia, California on his own at age 14 to start a career as a druggist.

== Military ==
During the Spanish–American War he served in the United States Army. He was a first sergeant in Company E of Visalia. On March 25, 1899, Sergeant Mixter won second prize at a National Guard sharpshooting competition in Sacramento.

== Pharmacy career ==
In 1903, he and a business partner opened a "Sith and Mixter" drug store in San Francisco, but moved back to Visalia to work with his brother two years later. The brothers established a family drugstore in Exeter, California that lasted from 1905 until 2009.

He died while visiting an oculist in San Francisco.

== Legislative history ==
In 1932, Senator Mixter submitted a bill funding construction of the Shasta Dam.
