= F. Douglas Ferrell =

American politician (1915–1982)

Member of the California State Assembly from the 55th district
- In office January 7, 1963 – January 2, 1967
- Preceded by: Vernon Kilpatrick
- Succeeded by: Leon D. Ralph

Personal details
- Born: February 21, 1915 Gonzales City, Texas, U.S.
- Died: July 5, 1982 (aged 67)
- Party: Democratic

F. Douglas Ferrell (February 21, 1915 – July 5, 1982) was a pastor and state legislator in California. He founded a church and served as a pastor in Los Angeles. He was a Democrat. He was the pastor of Tabernacle Faith Baptist Church. He served in the California Assembly from 1963 to December 1966.

He was born in Gonzales City, Texas. He graduated from the Los Angeles Theological Seminary.

== See also ==
- California's 55th State Assembly district
