= Leon D. Ralph =

American politician

Member of the California State Assembly from the 48th district
- In office December 2, 1974 – November 30, 1976
- Preceded by: Richard Alatorre
- Succeeded by: Maxine Waters

Member of the California State Assembly from the 55th district
- In office January 2, 1967 – November 30, 1974
- Preceded by: F. Douglas Ferrell
- Succeeded by: Richard Alatorre

Personal details
- Born: Leon Douglas Ralph; August 20, 1932 Richmond, Virginia, US
- Died: February 6, 2007 (aged 74) Long Beach, California, US
- Party: Democratic
- Spouses: Martha Ann Morgan (m. 1951); Pamela Joynes; m 1972

Military service
- Branch/service: United States Air Force
- Wars: Korean War

Leon Douglas Ralph (August 20, 1932 – February 6, 2007) was an American politician who served in the California State Assembly from 1967 to 1976. He died on February 6, 2007, in Long Beach, California, at age 74.

== Early Life ==
Ralph was born on August 20, 1932 in Richmond, Virginia to Arthur and Leanne Ralph. Ralph was raised in Richmond, graduating in 1950 at Armstrong High School in Richmond. After graduation Ralph would serve as a staff sergeant in the United States Air Force from August 1950 to July 1954. Ralph would also serve as a logistical analyst for Douglas Aircraft from 1956 to 1963.

Ralph would relocate to California during his early adult life, attending Los Angeles Valley College from 1959 to 1961, where he would graduate with a Associates of Arts degree. He would also attend the University of Colorado in Boulder, Colorado.
