= Frank D. Laughlin =

American politician

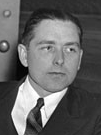
- Laughlin in 1936

Member of the California State Assembly from the 55th district
- In office January 7, 1935 – May 19, 1938
- Preceded by: Austin L. Tournoux
- Succeeded by: Vernon Kilpatrick

Personal details
- Born: May 19, 1899 Illinois
- Died: March 10, 1984 (aged 84) California
- Party: Democratic
- Spouse: Minna Lafferty
- Education: University of Wisconsin

Military service
- Branch/service: United States Army
- Battles/wars: World War I

Frank D. Laughlin (May 19, 1899 – March 10, 1984) served in the California State Assembly for the 55th district from 1935 until his resignation in 1938. During World War I, he served in the United States Army.

Laughlin was one of two dozen "EPIC Democrats" elected to the state legislature in 1934.
