= Alex P. Garcia =

American politician

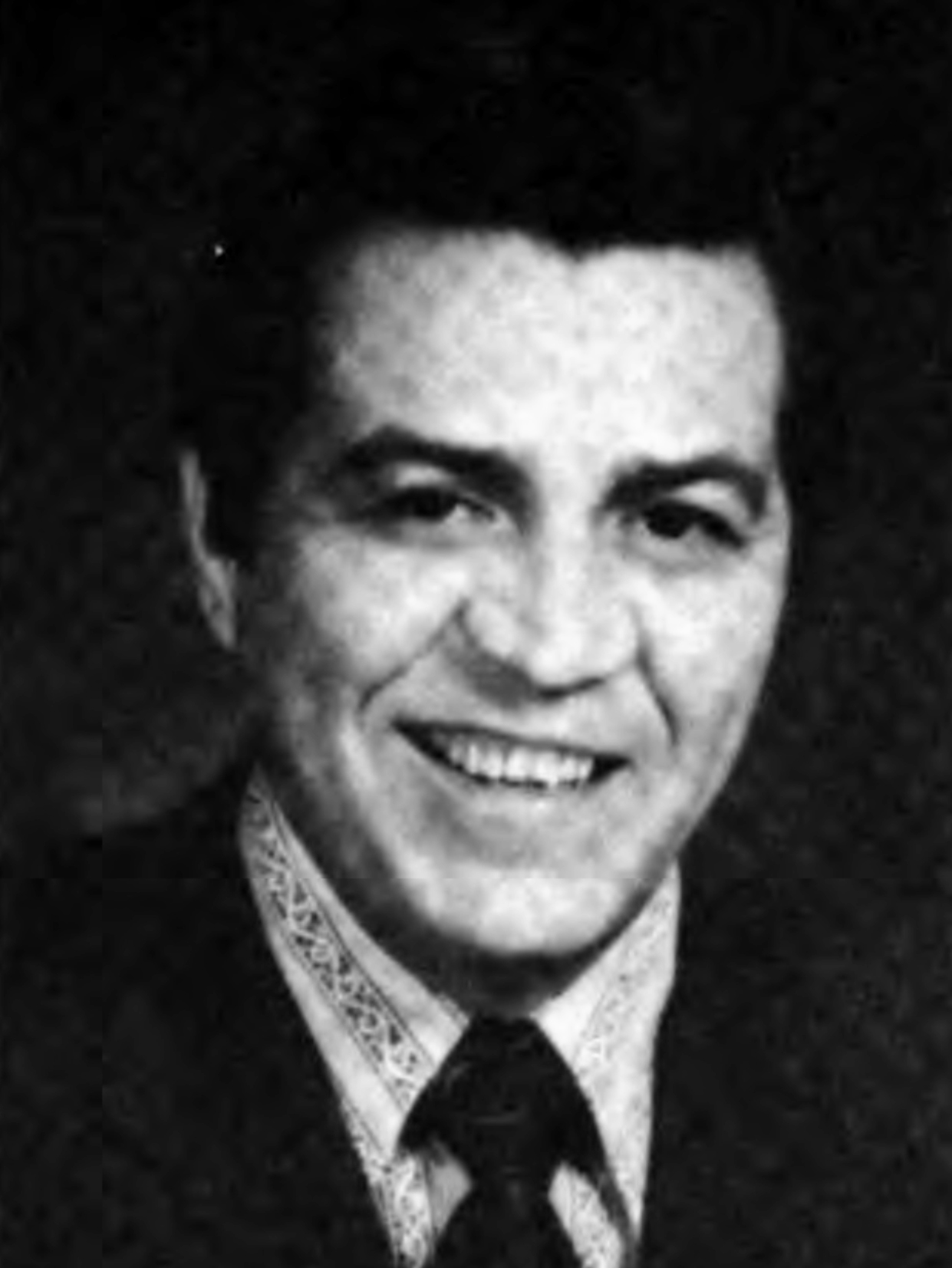
- Official portrait, 1975

Member of the California Senate from the 24th district
- In office December 2, 1974 –November 30, 1982
- Preceded by: Omer Rains
- Succeeded by: Art Torres

Member of the California State Assembly from the 40th district
- In office January 6, 1969 – November 30, 1974
- Preceded by: Edward E. Elliott
- Succeeded by: Tom Bane

Personal details
- Born: June 22, 1929 El Paso, Texas, U.S.
- Died: April 10, 1999 (aged 69) Los Angeles, California, U.S.
- Party: Democratic
- Spouse: Blanche Alvarez
- Children: 5
- Education: East Los Angeles Junior College; UCLA

Military service
- Branch/service: United States Army

Alex P. Garcia (June 22, 1929 – April 10, 1999) was an American politician in the state of California. He served in the California State Assembly from 1969 to 1974 and as a California State Senator from 1974 to 1982. He was a Democrat. He attended Los Angeles Schools, East Los Angeles Junior College, UCLA, and Southern California College of Business. He married Blanche Alvarez in 1948; his children are Alex, Jr., twins Daniel and Thomas, Cecilia and Catherine. He was a veteran of the U.S. Army.

== Background ==
Garcia, from Los Angeles, was the third Latino Democrat elected in 1968 to the Assembly. Peter R. Chacon, a Democrat from San Diego was elected in 1970. Together they formed the Chicano Legislative Caucus in 1973, along with three more Latinos, Joseph B. Montoya, Ray Gonzales, and Richard Alatorre, who elected to the State Assembly in 1972.

The formation of the Caucus was a significant achievement for the Latino community in California. The Caucus worked to create, and implement laws that serve to extend, protect, and reserve the rights of Californian Latinos, a first in California legislative history.
