= Isaac Bryan =

American politician (born 1992)

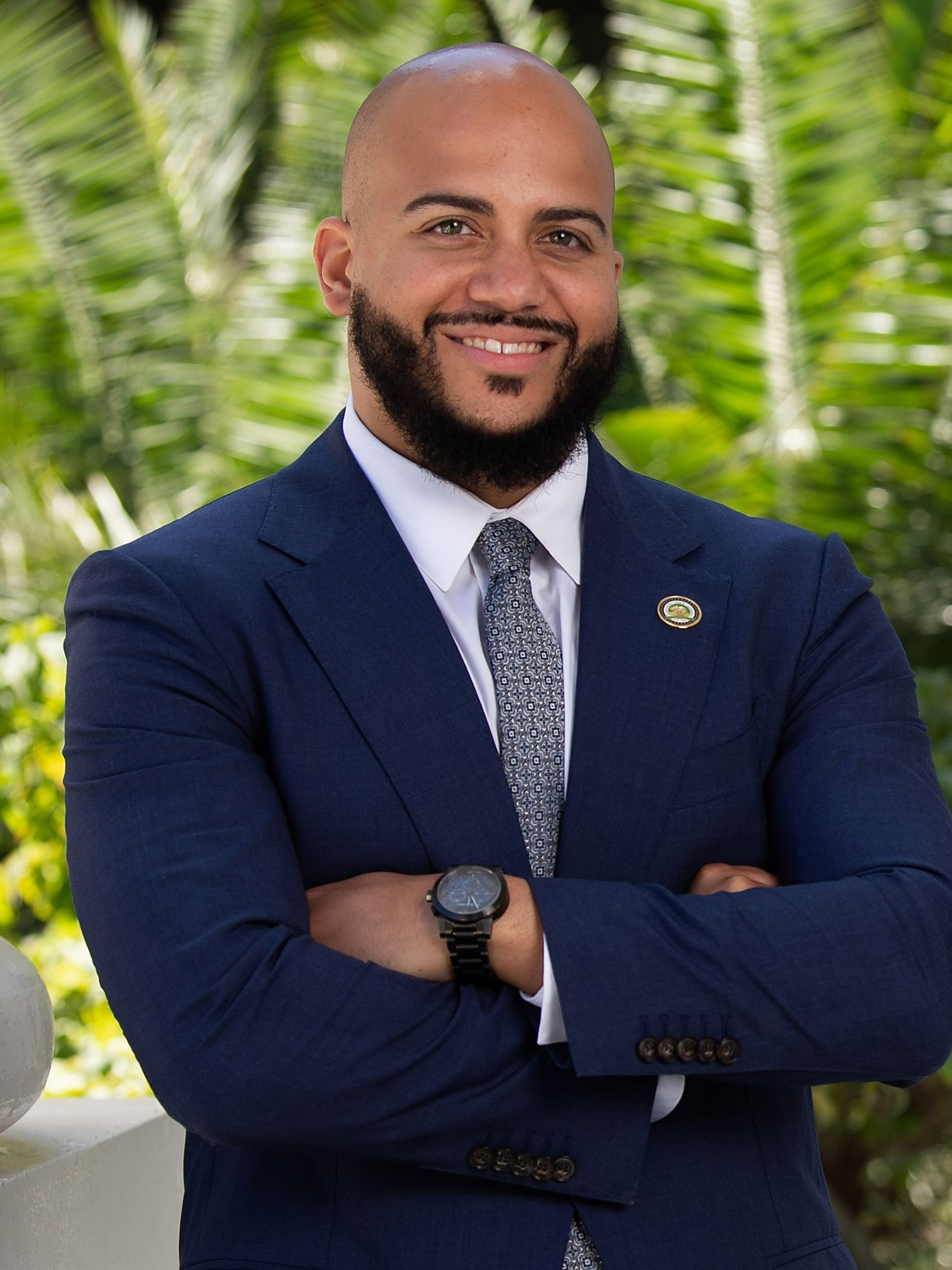
- Official portrait, 2022

Majority Leader of the California Assembly
- In office July 3, 2023 – November 22, 2023
- Preceded by: Eloise Reyes
- Succeeded by: Cecilia Aguiar-Curry

Member of the California State Assembly
- Incumbent
- Assumed office May 28, 2021
- Preceded by: Sydney Kamlager
- Constituency: 54th district (2021–2022); 55th district (2022–present)

Personal details
- Born: January 16, 1992 (age 34) Dallas, Texas, U.S.
- Party: Democratic
- Education: University of Arizona (BA); University of California, Los Angeles (MPP)

Isaac Gregory Bryan (born January 16, 1992) is an American politician serving as a Member of the California State Assembly where he represents the 55th district, which includes much of South Central Los Angeles. Bryan was previously the executive director of the University of California Los Angeles's Black Policy Project, and served as the Director of Public Policy for the UCLA Ralph J. Bunche Center. From July to November 2023, he served as Assembly Majority Leader.

== Early life and education ==
Bryan was born in Dallas, Texas, to a teenage mother in poverty who gave him up at birth. Bryan was adopted as an infant and has lived in California since he was in the sixth grade. His family served as a foster family for hundreds of children over two decades and adopted him and eight others from the child welfare system.

Bryan attended seven public schools and two California community colleges before earning a Bachelor of Arts in political science and sociology from the University of Arizona. He worked as a research fellow for the Rombach Institute on Crime, Delinquency and Corrections. During his time with the Rombach Institute, Bryan worked on juvenile justice and criminal justice reform. He also worked with a team of federal monitors to enforce a United States Department of Justice Consent Decree with the Maricopa County Sheriff's Office.

Bryan went on to earn a Master of Public Policy from UCLA Luskin School of Public Affairs. In 2017, Bryan was named a David Bohnett Foundation fellow, where Bryan previously served in Los Angeles Mayor Eric Garcetti's Office of Reentry, where he co-authored the city's first report on the holistic needs of Angelenos with justice system involvement.

== Career ==
=== UCLA Black Policy Project ===
Bryan is the founding director of UCLA's Black Policy Project (BPP). The BPP aims to build connections between black scholarship at UCLA and public policy decision making. Bryan also served as director of Public Policy for UCLA's Ralph J. Bunche Center for African American Studies.

During his time at UCLA, Bryan authored numerous studies and reports. Bryan and The Million Dollar Hoods Project issued several reports on the interactions between students and Los Angeles School Police Department. Bryan regularly provided media commentary on issues of racial inequality in the United States. During the summer of 2020, after the murder of George Floyd, Bryan led peaceful protests in Los Angeles.

=== Criminal justice reform ===
Bryan was one of the leading scholars who articulated that "defunding police" was really a call to question the size of our tax contributions to policing and criminalization at the expense of social services. Bryan was the co-chair for Los Angeles County's historic Measure J, which was approved by over 2.1 million voters and diverts at least 10% of the county's general funds "to address the disproportionate impact of racial injustice through community investment and alternatives to incarceration". Bryan regularly writes and provides commentary on policing and justice reform in the United States. He has been an outspoken advocate on the need to end the criminalization of poverty.

== California State Assembly ==
=== Election ===
In 2021, Bryan announced that he would be a candidate for the California Assembly to succeed fellow Democrat Sydney Kamlager, who was elected to the California Senate. Bryan's campaign for the Assembly was endorsed by many people across Los Angeles.

Bryan won the special election to represent the 54th district outright securing over 50% in the primary despite five other candidates, and was sworn into office.

During his time in the Legislature Bryan established the UCLA Center on Reproductive Health Law and Policy, ended prison gerrymandering, returned millions in stolen foster youth benefits, shut down the largest urban oil field in California, established a registry for people living with ALS, improved student health insurance coverage, expanded restorative justice practices, and started a select committee on Poverty and Economic Inclusion.

Bryan is a member of the California Legislative Progressive Caucus. In 2024, Bryan was elected to serve as Vice-Chair of the California Legislative Black Caucus.

== Electoral history ==
2021 California State Assembly 54th district special election Vacancy resulting from the resignation of Sydney Kamlager
Primary election
Party	Candidate	Votes	%
Democratic	Isaac Bryan	21,472	50.8
Democratic	Heather Hutt	10,538	24.9
Democratic	Cheryl Turner	4,072	9.6
Democratic	Dallas Denise Fowler	3,235	7.6
No party preference	Bernard Senter	1,667	3.9
Democratic	Samuel Morales	1,304	3.1
Total votes		42,288	100.0
Democratic hold			

2022 California State Assembly 55th district election
Primary election
Party	Candidate	Votes	%
Democratic	Isaac Bryan (incumbent)	79,141	85.7
Republican	Keith Girolamo Cascio	13,200	14.3
Total votes		92,341	100.0
General election
Democratic	Isaac Bryan (incumbent)	114,384	83.7
Republican	Keith Girolamo Cascio	22,295	16.3
Total votes		136,679	100.0
Democratic gain from Republican			

2024 California State Assembly 55th district election
Primary election
Party	Candidate	Votes	%
Democratic	Isaac Bryan (incumbent)	75,063	83.9
Republican	Keith Cascio	14,421	16.1
Total votes		89,484	100.0
General election
Democratic	Isaac Bryan (incumbent)	148,062	80.7
Republican	Keith Cascio	35,316	19.3
Total votes		183,378	100.0
Democratic hold			

California Assembly
Preceded by Eloise Reyes	Majority Leader of the California Assembly; 2023	Succeeded by Cecilia Aguiar-Curry
