= Gloria Molina =

American politician (1948–2023)

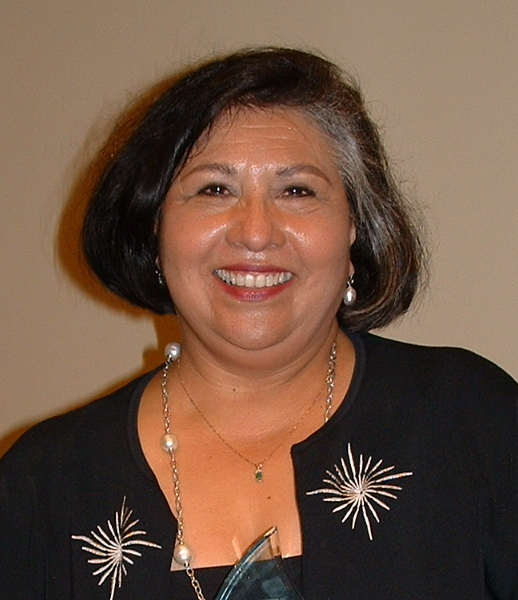
- Molina in 2007

Member of the Los Angeles County Board of Supervisors from the 1st district
- In office December 1, 1991 – December 1, 2014
- Preceded by: Peter Schabarum
- Succeeded by: Hilda Solis
Supervisory positions
Chair of Los Angeles County
In office December 8, 2009 – December 7, 2010
Preceded by	Don Knabe
Succeeded by	Michael D. Antonovich (Mayor)
In office December 7, 2004 – December 6, 2005
Preceded by	Don Knabe
Succeeded by	Michael D. Antonovich (Mayor)
In office December 7, 1999 – December 5, 2000
Preceded by	Don Knabe
Succeeded by	Michael D. Antonovich (Mayor)
In office December 6, 1994 – December 5, 1995
Preceded by	Yvonne Brathwaite Burke
Succeeded by	Michael D. Antonovich (Mayor)
Chair Pro Tem of Los Angeles County
In office December 2, 2008 – December 8, 2009
Preceded by	Don Knabe
Succeeded by	Michael D. Antonovich (Mayor Pro Tem)
In office December 2, 2003 – December 7, 2004
Preceded by	Don Knabe
Succeeded by	Michael D. Antonovich (Mayor Pro Tem)
In office December 8, 1998 – December 7, 1999
Preceded by	Don Knabe
Succeeded by	Michael D. Antonovich (Mayor Pro Tem)
In office December 7, 1993 – December 6, 1994
Preceded by	Yvonne Brathwaite Burke
Succeeded by	Michael D. Antonovich (Mayor Pro Tem)

Member of the California State Assembly from the 56th district
- In office December 6, 1982 – February 27, 1987
- Preceded by: Art Torres
- Succeeded by: Lucille Roybal-Allard

Member of the Los Angeles City Council from the 1st district
- In office February 3, 1987 – March 7, 1991
- Preceded by: Howard Finn
- Succeeded by: Mike Hernandez

Personal details
- Born: May 31, 1948 Los Angeles, California, U.S.
- Died: May 14, 2023 (aged 74) Los Angeles, California, U.S.
- Party: Democratic
- Spouse: Ron Martinez
- Children: 1, Valentina
- Education: Rio Hondo College; East Los Angeles College; California State University, Los Angeles

Jesús Gloria Molina (May 31, 1948 – May 14, 2023) was an American politician who served as a member of the Los Angeles City Council, the California State Assembly, the Los Angeles County Board of Supervisors and the Los Angeles County Metropolitan Transportation Authority.

Participating in the Chicano movement as a young activist, Molina entered politics in 1982, running in opposition to the powerful male-dominated Eastside political machine for a seat in the California State Assembly, becoming the first Latina elected to the assembly. She had a long unbeaten streak in electoral politics, becoming the first Latina elected to the Los Angeles City Council and to the Los Angeles County Board of Supervisors, and served on the Board for 23 years. After terming out on the Board, Molina ran again for the Los Angeles City Council in 2015, but was defeated by incumbent José Huizar.

Molina was considered a trailblazer and helped revitalize Los Angeles's Grand Park and supported the LA Plaza de Cultura y Artes project, and has been said to have paved the way for future female and Latina politicians. Grand Park in Los Angeles was re-named Gloria Molina Grand Park after her death in 2023.

== Early life and activism ==
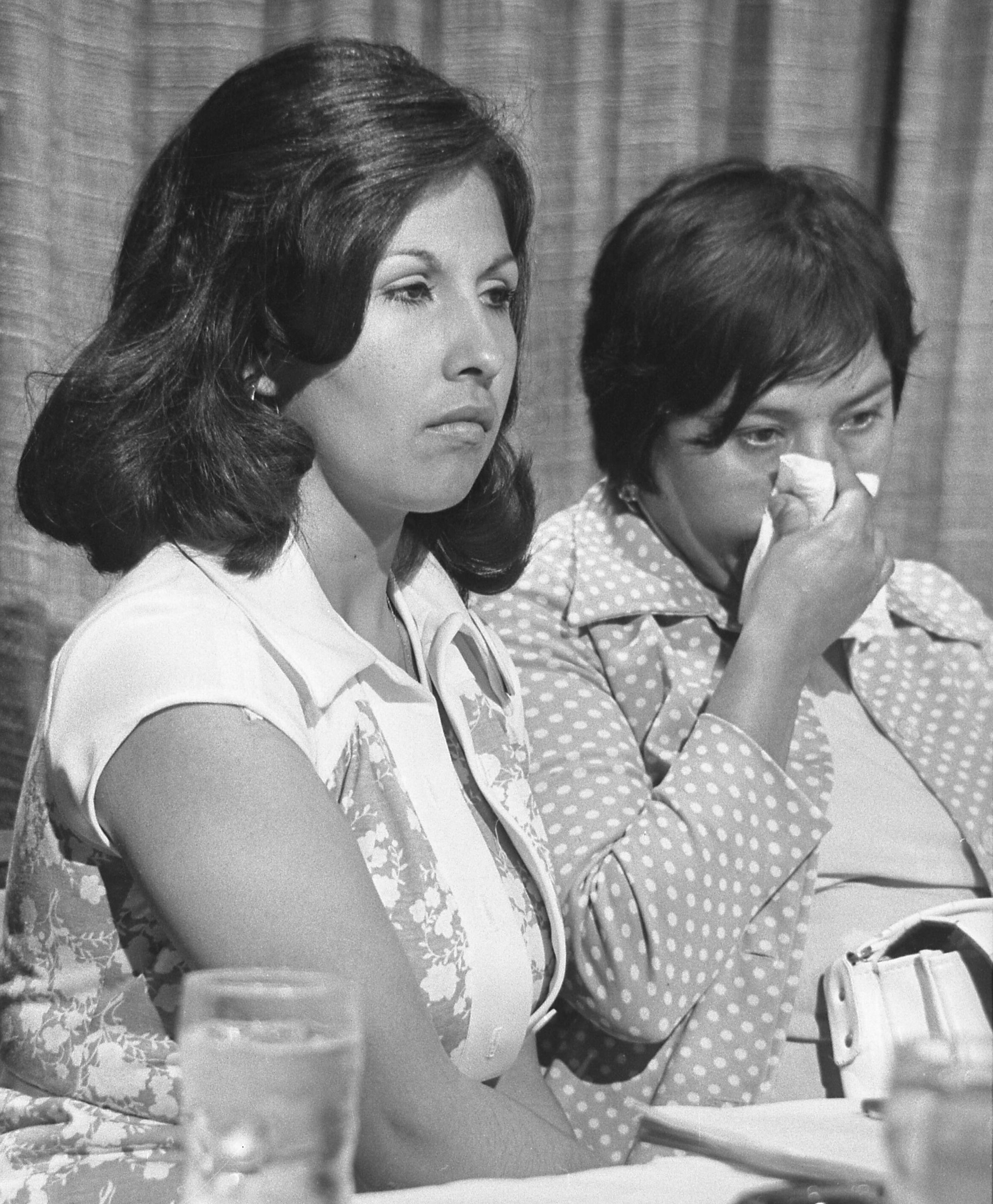
Molina at news conference in 1975

Molina was born on May 31, 1948, in Montebello, California, to Leonardo Castillo Molina and Concepción Molina, who immigrated to Los Angeles from Mexico. She grew up as one of ten children in the Los Angeles suburb of Pico Rivera, attending El Rancho High School before going to East Los Angeles College and California State University, Los Angeles. While attending college, she worked full-time as a legal secretary. Then she became certified as an adult education instructor and taught clerical skills at the East Los Angeles Skills Center.

Molina's early career was characterized by her involvement in the Chicano movement and advocating for women's health. An early accomplishment was when she started a Nurse Mentoring Program in an effort to address the country's shortage of nurses by partnering with local community colleges to encourage and help more students to pursue a nursing degree.

== Political career ==
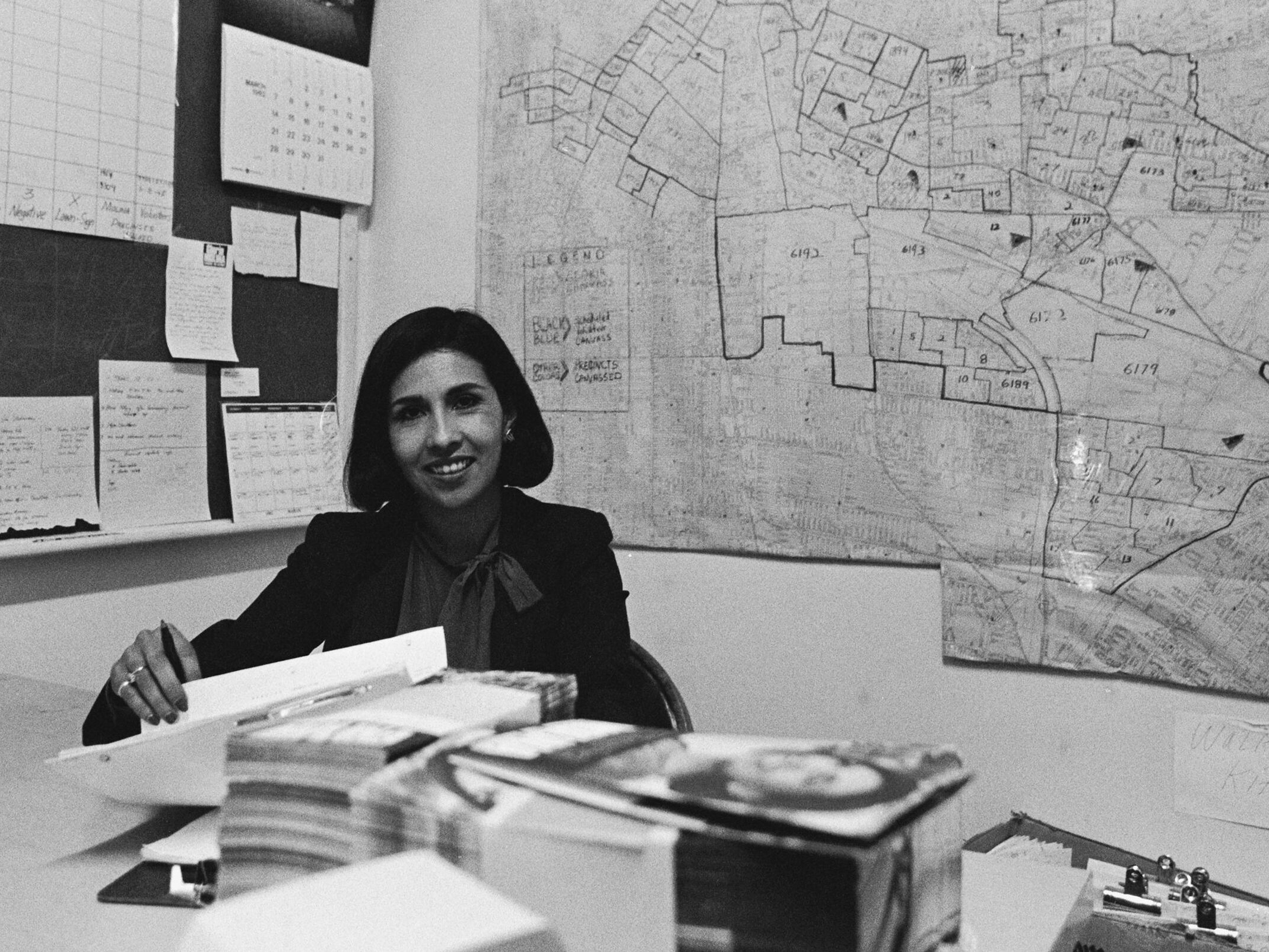
Molina in her office in 1982

Before being elected to public office, Molina served in the Carter Administration as a deputy for presidential personnel. After leaving the White House, she served in San Francisco as a deputy director for the Department of Health and Human Services. She stated to the Los Angeles Times that she had seen that men had "kept dismissing the contributions of her and other women", which was why she ran for office in 1982.

=== California State Assembly ===
In 1982, Art Torres vacated his seat in California's 56th State Assembly district to run for State Senate, with Torres and Assemblymember Richard Alatorre making Richard Polanco run in the district. Molina had approached the two about running in the district, but was told that she could not since Polanco was running. She ran anyway, and defeated Polanco to become the first Latina woman to be elected in the California State Legislature. Her win would set the stage for a political feud between Torres and Molina, with supporters being called the Torristas and Molinistas.

=== Los Angeles City Council ===
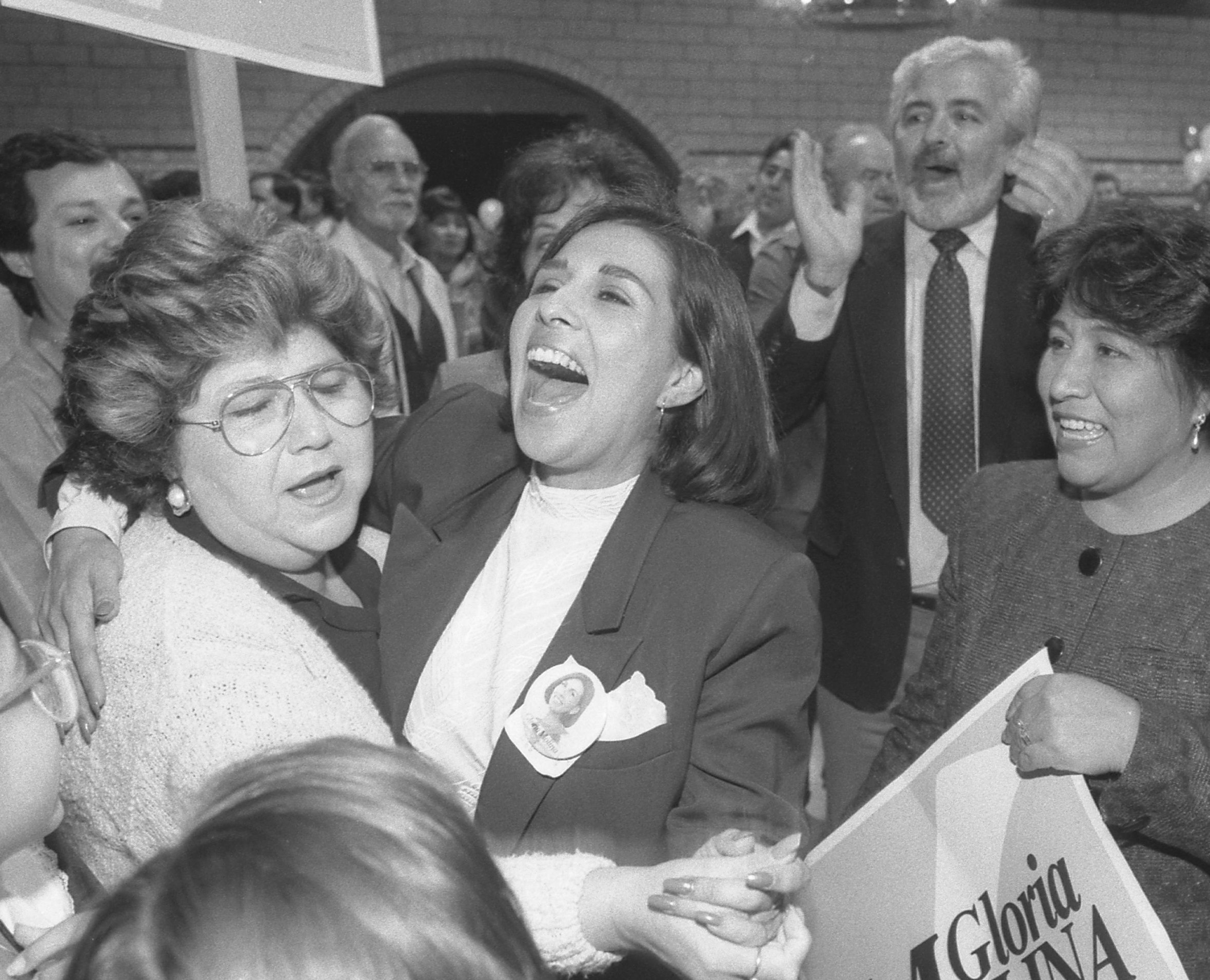
Molina celebrating her win in the City Council in 1987

In 1986, the 1st district of the Los Angeles City Council was vacant due to incumbent Howard Finn's death, and the City Council decided that the district would be moved from the San Fernando Valley to Eastside Los Angeles. Now in a largely Latino district, Molina announced her candidacy for the special election. She was mainly challenged by Larry Gonzalez, a member of the Los Angeles Board of Education. In the election, she defeated Gonzalez and two others by a landslide, making her the first Latina woman to be elected to the City Council. She was succeeded in the State Assembly by Lucille Roybal-Allard.

While on the council, Molina feuded with Richard Alatorre, who had been elected to the council in 1985.

=== Los Angeles County Board of Supervisors ===
In 1990, Peter F. Schabarum decided not to run for re-election for the 1st district of the Los Angeles County Board of Supervisors, but served an extra three months while the board redistricted under court orders to create a majority-Latino district. That year, Molina announced that she would be running for the seat, being challenged by U.S. Representative Matthew G. Martínez and Art Torres. The runoff election was between Molina and Torres, with Torres having a lead in fundraising for his campaign. Although Molina was at a disadvantage financially, she still defeated Torres to become the first Latina to be elected to the Board of Supervisors.

At her first meeting, she was described as "[giving] hints of the in-your-face approach that sometimes characterized her years on the City Council." During her 23 years serving the Los Angeles County board of supervisors, she became known as a fiscal watchdog committed to overseeing good government reforms, maintenance of the county's public health care system, and also quality-of-life issues for the millions of county residents living in the unincorporated areas.

One of Molina's significant achievements was her involvement with the Mothers of East Los Angeles, a group formed to organize against a proposed plan to build a prison in East LA. As city councilwoman, she found government unresponsive to her concerns of yet another proposal to build a prison near schools in the predominantly Chicano and Mexican neighborhood. In the mid-2000s she drove through skid row looking for families with children and would call the Department of Family and Children Services, to help families and remove children from unsafe conditions.

In 2008, Molina piloted a program that became known as the Gloria Molina Foster Youth Education Program. This program attempted to improve the high school graduation rates of students in the foster care system. By committing social workers to aid in helping manage and track these students' academic success the program was able to raise the graduation rate from the national average of 58% to 80%. When Molina retired from her supervisor position in 2014 because of term limits, she stated that one of her biggest regrets was that she was not able to do more to improve the high school graduation rates amongst fostered youth.

== Post-political career ==
In 2014, facing a term limit on the Board of Supervisors, Molina announced that she was challenging 14th district incumbent José Huizar for his seat on the City Council. She had stated that she had considered retirement before being asked to run from various people, and criticized Huizar for not heeding his constituents. In the 2015 election, Huizar defeated Molina and other competitors by a landslide, avoiding the need for a runoff.

In 2021, Molina was a fellow at the USC Center for the Political Future.

== Legislation ==
=== Anti-food truck bill ===
In April 2008, Molina introduced legislation to the board of supervisors which would severely increase penalties on food vendors in unincorporated areas of Los Angeles County, including East L.A. The new rules would punish parking of a food truck for more than one hour with a $1000 fine and/or six months in jail. This move was specifically targeted at vendors operating taco trucks, a cultural institution in East L.A. as well as the county as a whole. Newspaper editorials decried the move, and a petition was quickly set up to attempt to force a repeal of the legislation. The taco vendors also hired a lawyer to fight their cause. The ordinance was ultimately struck down by a judge.

=== Boycott of Arizona ===
In June 2010, Molina voted yes with two other Los Angeles County supervisors to boycott Arizona because of SB 1070. Molina said in her statement that the law "simply goes too far" and that "a lot of people have pointed out that I am sworn as an L.A. County supervisor to uphold the Constitution. All I can say is that I believe that Arizona's law is unconstitutional."

== Personal life ==
Molina was married to Ron Martinez, a businessman, with the two having a daughter, Valentina Martinez. She lived in the Los Angeles neighborhood of Mount Washington.

In March 2023, Molina announced that she had been diagnosed with terminal cancer three years prior, and that she had been battling it with treatments but it had become very aggressive. She died on May 14, 2023, seventeen days before her 75th birthday.

== Honors and legacy ==
In April 2006, Molina was honored as the "Hispanic Business Woman of the Year" by Hispanic Business magazine. In 2014, she was awarded an honorary doctorate of Humane Letters (L.H.D.) from Whittier College. Molina also quilted, founding the East L.A. Stitchers and frequently knitting with the group until her announcement of terminal cancer.

In 2023, after Molina's announcement of terminal cancer, Hilda Solis, Molina's successor on the Board of Supervisors, introduced a motion to rename Grand Park to Gloria Molina Grand Park, honoring her contributions to the park's redevelopment. It was approved unanimously by the Board of Supervisors the day it was introduced. A motion to endorse the renaming passing in the Los Angeles City Council, with Mayor Karen Bass also endorsing it. Another motion by councilmembers Monica Rodriguez and Kevin de León renamed the pedestrian crosswalks "Gloria Molina Legacy Pathway". A couple of days after, the Metro Board of Directors voted to dedicate the East LA Civic Center station to Molina.

== See also ==
- National Association of Latino Elected and Appointed Officials
- Torristas and Molinistas

California Assembly
Preceded by Art Torres	Member of the California Assembly from the 56th district December 6, 1982 – February 27, 1987	Succeeded by Lucille Roybal-Allard
Civic offices
Preceded by Howard Finn	Member of the Los Angeles City Council from the 1st district 1987–1991	Succeeded by Mike Hernandez
Preceded by Peter Schabarum	Member of the Los Angeles County Board of Supervisors from the 1st district 1991–2014	Succeeded by Hilda Solis
Preceded by Don Knabe	Chair of Los Angeles County; 2009–2010; 2004–2005; 1999–2000; 1994–1995	Succeeded by Michael D. Antonovich (Mayor)
Preceded by Yvonne Brathwaite Burke	Chair of Los Angeles County; 2009–2010; 2004–2005; 1999–2000; 1994–1995	Succeeded by Michael D. Antonovich (Mayor)
Preceded by Don Knabe	Chair Pro Tem of Los Angeles County; 2008–2009; 2003–2004; 1998–1999; 1993–1994	Succeeded by Michael D. Antonovich (Mayor Pro Tem)
Preceded by Yvonne Brathwaite Burke	Chair Pro Tem of Los Angeles County; 2008–2009; 2003–2004; 1998–1999; 1993–1994	Succeeded by Michael D. Antonovich (Mayor Pro Tem)
