= Art Torres =

American politician (born 1946)

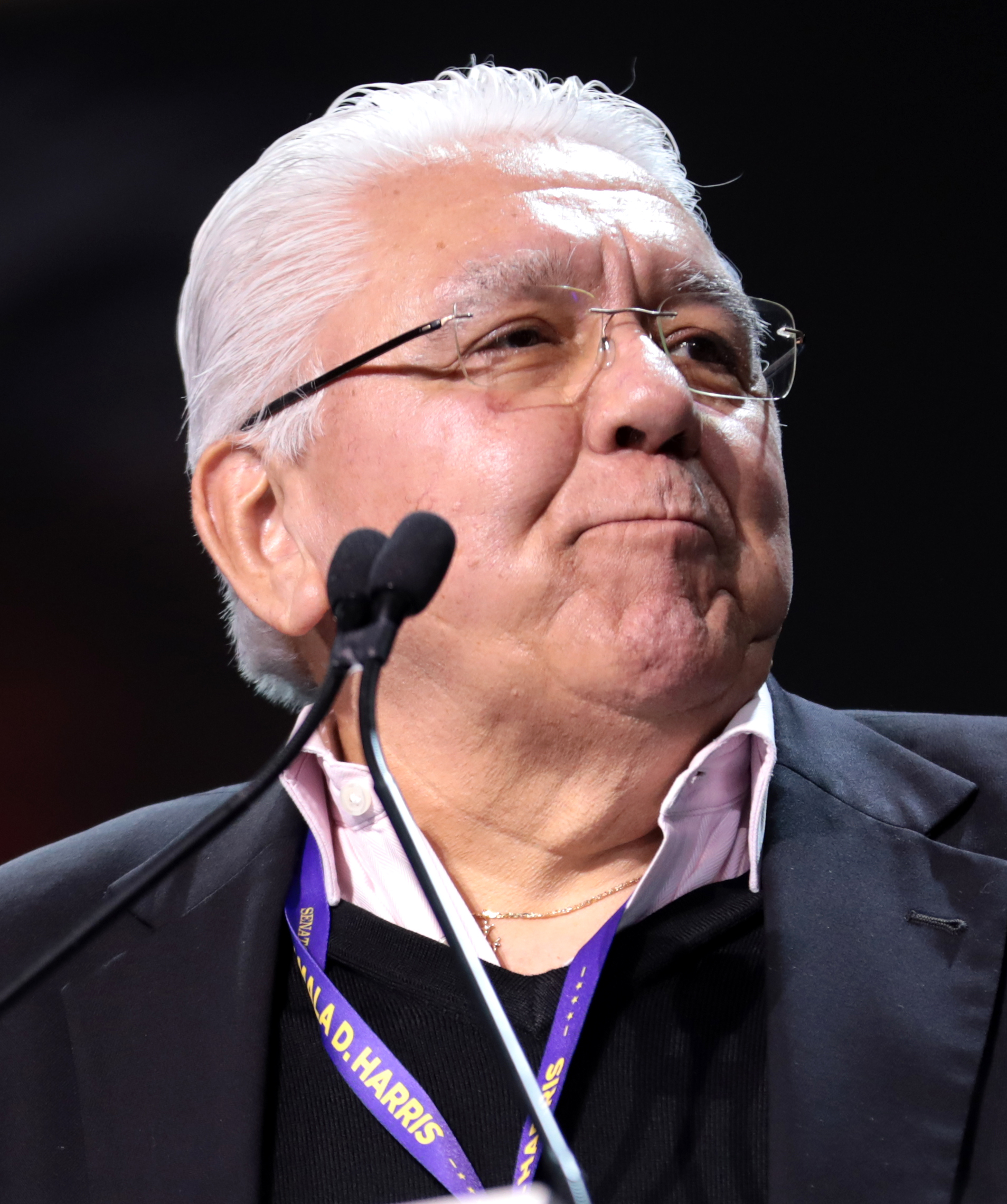
- Torres in 2019

Chair of the California Democratic Party
- In office 1996–2009
- Preceded by: Bill Press
- Succeeded by: John L. Burton

Member of the California State Senate from the 24th district
- In office December 6, 1982 – November 30, 1994
- Preceded by: Alex P. Garcia
- Succeeded by: Hilda Solis

Member of the California State Assembly from the 56th district
- In office December 2, 1974 – November 30, 1982
- Preceded by: Charles H. Warren
- Succeeded by: Gloria Molina (redistricted)

Personal details
- Born: September 24, 1946 (age 80) Los Angeles, California, U.S.
- Party: Democratic
- Spouse: Yolonda Nava (divorced)
- Domestic partner: Gonzalo Escudero
- Children: 2
- Education: University of California, Santa Cruz (BA); University of California, Davis (JD)

Arthur A. Torres (born September 24, 1946) is an American former politician who served as a member of the California State Legislature. He is the vice chair of the Independent Citizens Oversight Committee, the governing board of the California Institute for Regenerative Medicine (CIRM). CIRM, established in 2005 following the passage of Proposition 71, is charged with allocating US$3 billion to California universities and research institutions to support and advance stem cell research. He is a colon cancer survivor and serves on the board as a patient advocate.

He is also a member of the Board of Regents of the University of California.

Torres served as the chairman of the California Democratic Party from 1996 to 2009. He was the first Latino in the California Democratic Party to have been nominated for statewide office when he won the Democratic primary for insurance commissioner in 1994. He is openly gay. He is the father of a son and daughter.

== Early life and education ==
Torres graduated from Montebello High School in 1964. He earned a Bachelor of Arts degree from the University of California, Santa Cruz and a Juris Doctor from UC Davis School of Law. He was a John F. Kennedy teaching fellow at the Harvard Kennedy School.

== Career ==
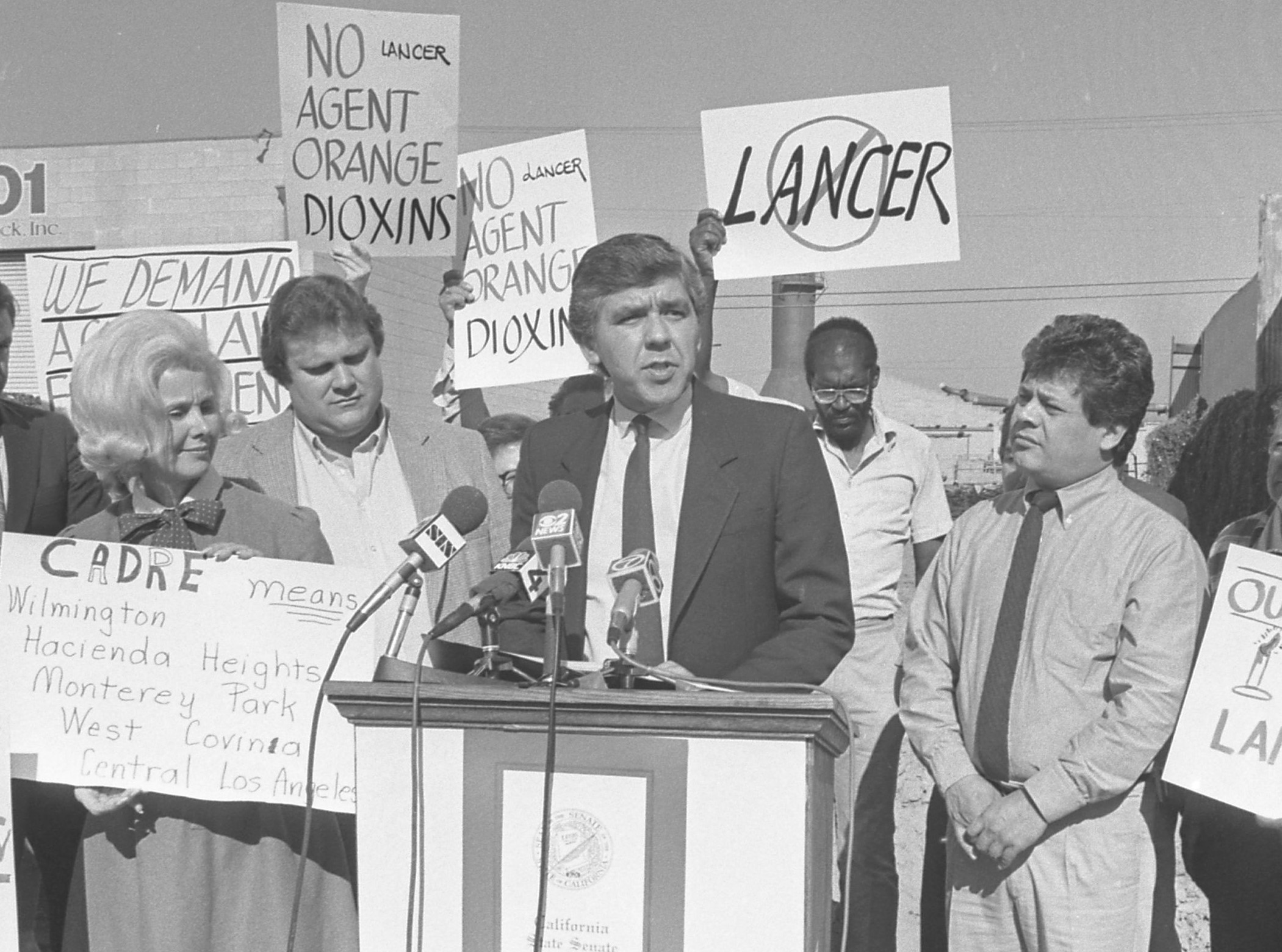
Torres speaking against the Los Angeles City Energy Recovery Project in 1986

In 1972, Torres was defeated in his first election for a seat in the California State Assembly by 615 votes. Soon after the election, he became the national legislative director for the United Farm Workers, AFL-CIO, at 25 years of age.

Two years later, Torres won a seat in the California State Assembly, where he served for the next eight years. In 1982, he was elected to the State Senate, unseating incumbent Alex P. Garcia after an extremely bitter Democratic primary.

Torres served in the State Senate for another twelve years, from 1982 to 1994. He served as chairman of the Insurance Committee, Assembly Health Committee, Senate Joint Committee on Science and Technology, the Joint Committee on Refugees, the Senate Committee on the Entertainment Industry, and he was the founding chairman of the Senate Toxics Committee. Torres co-authored legislation that created the Museum of Tolerance in Los Angeles, and the California Clean Water Act.

The first "Restroom Equity" Act in the United States was passed in California in 1989, introduced by Torres after several long waits for his wife to return from the bathroom.

In 1994, Torres was nominated for insurance commissioner, making him the first Latino Democrat nominated for a statewide office in California history. Torres would eventually be defeated by Republican Assemblyman Chuck Quackenbush.

On January 14, 1995, speaking at the University of California, Riverside to a group composed mainly of Latinos Torres said that Proposition 187, passed by voters months prior, was "the last gasp of white America in California."

Torres served as a German Marshall Fund Fellow and delivered a paper on Western European immigration issues. He was appointed by the United States Senate, by the late US senator Edward M. Kennedy, to the Commission on International Migration and Cooperative Economic Development, which presented its recommendations on immigration reform to then-President George H. W. Bush in 1990.

Torres served as president of the Kaitz Foundation, dedicated to bringing more people of color into management within the cable television industry through the Kaitz Fellowship program. The foundation provided grants to minority oriented motion picture and cable television associations. The Kaitz Board was composed of a majority of the top CEOs in the cable television industry.

Torres is a member of the board of "One Legacy", an organ transplant foundation in Los Angeles, and the Latino Community Foundation, serving the Bay Area and headquartered in San Francisco. He has served on the board of the AIDS Healthcare Foundation, the San Francisco Ballet, "Heal the Bay" in Santa Monica, and the advisory board of The Princeton Review.

In 2017, San Francisco Mayor Ed Lee appointed Torres to the San Francisco Municipal Transportation Agency board of directors. He was confirmed unanimously by the Board of Supervisors.

== Personal life ==
Torres was formerly married to Yolonda Nava, a television newscaster and talk show hostess.

In March 2006, Torres had surgery to remove cancer from his colon. The operation was successful, but it prevented him from chairing the 2006 California State Democratic Convention in late-April. Former San Francisco Mayor Willie Brown and first vice-chair Alexandra Gallardo-Rooker substituted for Torres as convention chair.

Torres came out as a gay man in 2009, thanking his longtime partner Gonzalo Escudero at a farewell speech to the California Democratic Party.

== See also ==
- Torristas and Molinistas
