= California's 55th State Assembly district =

American legislative district

Current assemblymember
Isaac Bryan; D–Los Angeles
- Population (2010) • Voting age • Citizen voting age: 461,696; 351,337; 287,325
- Demographics: 34.05% White; 2.68% Black; 29.99% Latino; 31.91% Asian; 0.37% Native American; 0.18% Hawaiian/Pacific Islander; 0.25% other; 0.57% remainder of multiracial
- Registered voters: 266,506
- Registration: 35.16% Democratic; 33.98% Republican; 26.10% No party preference

California's 55th State Assembly district is one of 80 California State Assembly districts. It is currently represented by Democrat Isaac Bryan of Los Angeles .

== District profile ==
Prior to the 2022 California elections, the district straddled the intersection of three counties and several distinct regions. Centered on the Chino Hills, it included the southeastern margins of the San Gabriel Valley as well as parts of the northern Santa Ana Valley. After the 2020 redistricting cycle, the district encompassed the neighborhoods of Baldwin Hills, the Crenshaw District, Culver City, Ladera Heights, Mar Vista, Del Rey, Palms, Pico-Robertson, Beverly Grove, Mid-Wilshire, and large parts of South Los Angeles.

== Election results from statewide races ==
Year	Office	Results
2021	Recall	Yes 53.3 – 46.7%
2020	President	Biden 52.8 – 45.4%
2018	Governor	Cox 52.1 – 47.9%
2018	Senator	Feinstein 55.9 – 44.1%
2016	President	Clinton 49.9 – 44.6%
2016	Senator	Harris 55.3 – 44.7%
2014	Governor	Kashkari 57.2 – 42.8%
2012	President	Romney 52.2 – 45.8%
2012	Senator	Emken 52.2 – 47.8%

== List of assembly members representing the district ==
Due to redistricting, the 55th district has been moved around different parts of the state. The current iteration resulted from the 2021 redistricting by the California Citizens Redistricting Commission.

Assembly members	Party	Years served	Counties represented	Notes
William H. Jordan	Republican	January 5, 1885 – January 7, 1889	Alameda	
Melvin C. Chapman	Republican	January 7, 1889 – January 5, 1891	Alameda	
E. G. Cram	Republican	January 5, 1891 – January 2, 1893	Alameda	
Augustus Griffin Bennett, Sr.	Republican	January 2, 1893 – April 13, 1894	Santa Clara	
Vacant		April 13, 1894 – January 7, 1895	Santa Clara	
John D. Kelsey	Republican	January 7, 1895 – January 4, 1897	Santa Clara	Lost election after his opponent contested the election.
J. J. McLaurin	Nonpartisan	January 4, 1897 – January 2, 1899	Santa Clara	Won the election after contesting the election.
John D. Kelsey	Republican	January 2, 1899 – January 1, 1901	Santa Clara	
George H. Anderson	Republican	January 1, 1901 – January 5, 1903	Santa Clara	
George Steward Walker	Republican	January 5, 1903 – January 2, 1905	Santa Clara	
Paul J. Arnerich	Republican	January 2, 1905 – January 7, 1907	Santa Clara	
John Turner Higgins	Republican	January 7, 1907 – January 4, 1909	Santa Clara	
Robert L. Telfer	Republican	January 4, 1909 – January 6, 1913	Santa Clara	
George Washington Wyllie	Republican	January 6, 1913 – January 4, 1915	Tulare	
Fred Carroll Scott	Progressive	January 4, 1915 – January 8, 1917	Tulare	
Robert Horbach	Republican	January 8, 1917 – January 6, 1919	Tulare	
Charles W. Cleary	Republican	January 6, 1919 – January 5, 1925	Tulare	
Frank W. Mixter	Republican	January 5, 1925 – January 5, 1931	Tulare	
Milton M. Golden	Republican	January 5, 1931 – January 2, 1933	Los Angeles	
Austin L. Tournoux	Democratic	January 2, 1933 – January 7, 1935	Los Angeles	
Frank D. Laughlin	Democratic	January 7, 1935 – May 19, 1938	Los Angeles	Resigned from office.
Vacant		May 19, 1938 – January 2, 1939	Los Angeles	
Vernon Kilpatrick	Democratic	January 2, 1939 – January 7, 1963	Los Angeles	
F. Douglas Ferrell	Democratic	January 7, 1963 – January 2, 1967	Los Angeles	
Leon D. Ralph	Democratic	January 2, 1967 – November 30, 1974	Los Angeles	
Richard Alatorre	Democratic	December 2, 1974 – December 20, 1985	Los Angeles	Resigned from office.
Vacant		December 20, 1985 – June 5, 1986	Los Angeles	
Richard Polanco	Democratic	June 5, 1986 – November 30, 1992	Los Angeles	Sworn in after winning special election to fill the vacant seat left by Alatorre.
Juanita Millender-McDonald	Democratic	December 7, 1992 – April 15, 1996	Los Angeles	Resigned from office.
Vacant		April 15, 1996 – December 2, 1996	Los Angeles	
Richard Floyd	Democratic	December 2, 1996 – November 30, 2000	Los Angeles	
Jenny Oropeza	Democratic	December 4, 2000 – November 30, 2006	Los Angeles	
Laura Richardson	Democratic	December 4, 2006 – September 4, 2007	Los Angeles	Resigned from office to be sworn into Congress for the 37th congressional district.
Vacant		September 4, 2007 – February 7, 2008	Los Angeles	
Warren Furutani	Democratic	February 7, 2008 – November 30, 2012	Los Angeles	Sworn in after winning special election to fill vacant seat left by Richardson.
Curt Hagman	Republican	December 3, 2012 – November 30, 2014	Los Angeles, Orange, San Bernardino	
Ling Ling Chang	Republican	December 2, 2014 – November 30, 2016	Los Angeles, Orange, San Bernardino	
Phillip Chen	Republican	December 5, 2016 – November 30, 2022	Los Angeles, Orange, San Bernardino	
Isaac Bryan	Democratic	December 5, 2022 – present	Los Angeles	

== Election results (1990–present) ==
=== 2024 ===
2024 California State Assembly 55th district election
Primary election
Party	Candidate	Votes	%
Democratic	Isaac Bryan (incumbent)	75,063	83.9
Republican	Keith Cascio	14,421	16.1
Total votes		89,484	100.0
General election
Democratic	Isaac Bryan (incumbent)	148,062	80.7
Republican	Keith Cascio	35,316	19.3
Total votes		183,378	100.0
Democratic hold			

=== 2022 ===
2022 California State Assembly 55th district election
Primary election
Party	Candidate	Votes	%
Democratic	Isaac Bryan (incumbent)	79,141	85.7
Republican	Keith Girolamo Cascio	13,200	14.3
Total votes		92,341	100.0
General election
Democratic	Isaac Bryan (incumbent)	114,384	83.7
Republican	Keith Girolamo Cascio	22,295	16.3
Total votes		136,679	100.0
Democratic gain from Republican			

=== 2020 ===
2020 California State Assembly 55th district election
Primary election
Party	Candidate	Votes	%
Republican	Phillip Chen (incumbent)	64,785	56.2
Democratic	Andrew E. Rodriguez	50,458	43.8
Total votes		115,243	100.0
General election
Republican	Phillip Chen (incumbent)	125,212	54.9
Democratic	Andrew E. Rodriguez	102,683	45.1
Total votes		227,895	100.0
Republican hold			

=== 2018 ===
2018 California State Assembly 55th district election
Primary election
Party	Candidate	Votes	%
Republican	Phillip Chen	42,664	47.2
Democratic	Gregg D. Fritchle	20,441	22.6
Democratic	Melissa Fazli	14,016	15.5
Republican	James Gerbus	9,731	10.8
Republican	Scott Lebda	3,571	3.9
Total votes		90,423	100.0
General election
Republican	Phillip Chen	87,928	54.9
Democratic	Gregg D. Fritchle	72,256	45.1
Total votes		160,184	100.0
Republican hold			

=== 2016 ===
2016 California State Assembly 55th district election
Primary election
Party	Candidate	Votes	%
Democratic	Gregg D. Fritchle	32,439	35.9
Republican	Phillip Chen	19,684	21.8
Republican	Mike Spence	18,737	20.7
Republican	Ray Marquez	10,881	12.0
Republican	Steven M. Tye	8,600	9.5
Total votes		90,341	100.0
General election
Republican	Phillip Chen	98,960	57.7
Democratic	Gregg D. Fritchle	72,471	42.3
Total votes		171,431	100.0
Republican hold			

=== 2014 ===
2014 California State Assembly 55th district election
Primary election
Party	Candidate	Votes	%
Republican	Ling Ling Chang	13,242	28.7
Democratic	Gregg D. Fritchle	12,243	26.5
Republican	Phillip Chen	10,659	23.1
Republican	Steve Tye	9,987	21.6
Total votes		46,131	100.0
General election
Republican	Ling Ling Chang	54,313	63.7
Democratic	Gregg D. Fritchle	30,895	36.3
Total votes		85,208	100.0
Republican hold			

=== 2012 ===
2012 California State Assembly 55th district election
Primary election
Party	Candidate	Votes	%
Republican	Curt Hagman (incumbent)	40,268	69.1
Democratic	Gregg D. Fritchle	17,994	30.9
Total votes		58,262	100.0
General election
Republican	Curt Hagman (incumbent)	97,330	59.7
Democratic	Gregg D. Fritchle	65,652	40.3
Total votes		162,982	100.0
Republican gain from Democratic			

=== 2010 ===
2010 California State Assembly 55th district election
Party	Candidate	Votes	%
Democratic	Warren Furutani (incumbent)	61,088	70.7
Republican	Christopher Salabaj	25,328	29.3
Total votes		86,416	100.0
Democratic hold			

=== 2008 ===
2008 California State Assembly 55th district election
Party	Candidate	Votes	%
Democratic	Warren Furutani (incumbent)	84,597	71.7
Republican	Edwin Williams	33,420	28.3
Total votes		118,017	100.0
Democratic hold			

=== 2008 (special) ===
2008 California State Assembly 55th district special election Vacancy resulting from the resignation of Laura Richardson
Party	Candidate	Votes	%
Democratic	Warren Furutani	48,419	69.8
American Independent	Charlotte Gibson	10,785	15.5
Libertarian	Herb Peters	10,168	14.7
Total votes		69,372	100.0
Democratic hold			

=== 2006 ===
2006 California State Assembly 55th district election
Party	Candidate	Votes	%
Democratic	Laura Richardson	50,006	68.1
Republican	Margherita Underhill	23,421	31.9
Total votes		83,427	100.0
Democratic hold			

=== 2004 ===
2004 California State Assembly 55th district election
Party	Candidate	Votes	%
Democratic	Jenny Oropeza (incumbent)	73,594	66.7
Republican	Margherita Palumbo Underhill	36,800	33.3
Total votes		110,394	100.0
Democratic hold			

=== 2002 ===
2002 California State Assembly 55th district election
Party	Candidate	Votes	%
Democratic	Jenny Oropeza (incumbent)	48,299	79.9
Libertarian	Guy Wilson	11,693	19.3
No party	Margherita Underhill (write-in)	525	0.8
Total votes		60,517	100.0
Democratic hold			

=== 2000 ===
2000 California State Assembly 55th district election
Party	Candidate	Votes	%
Democratic	Jenny Oropeza	57,735	74.6
Republican	Saul E. Lankster	15,806	20.4
Libertarian	Guy Wilson	3,822	4.9
Total votes		77,363	100.0
Democratic hold			

=== 1998 ===
1998 California State Assembly 55th district election
Party	Candidate	Votes	%
Democratic	Richard Floyd (incumbent)	44,407	76.6
Republican	Ervin "Don" Eslinger	11,434	19.7
Libertarian	Guy Wilson	2,149	3.7
Total votes		57,990	100.0
Democratic hold			

=== 1996 ===
1996 California State Assembly 55th district election
Party	Candidate	Votes	%
Democratic	Richard Floyd	50,116	74.2
Republican	Ronald Hayes	17,401	25.8
Total votes		67,517	100.0
Democratic hold			

=== 1994 ===
1994 California State Assembly 55th district election
Party	Candidate	Votes	%
Democratic	Juanita Millender-McDonald (incumbent)	45,084	80.6
Libertarian	Daniel O. Dalton	10,857	19.4
Total votes		55,941	100.0
Democratic hold			

=== 1992 ===
1992 California State Assembly 55th district election
Party	Candidate	Votes	%
Democratic	Juanita Millender-McDonald	63,337	82.8
Libertarian	Shannon Anderson	13,168	17.2
Total votes		76,505	100.0
Democratic hold			

=== 1990 ===
1990 California State Assembly 55th district election
Party	Candidate	Votes	%
Democratic	Richard Polanco (incumbent)	29,912	78.3
Libertarian	Dale S. Olvers	8,293	21.7
Total votes		38,205	100.0
Democratic hold			

== See also ==
- California State Assembly
- California State Assembly districts
- Districts in California
