= Richard Alatorre =

American politician (1943–2024)

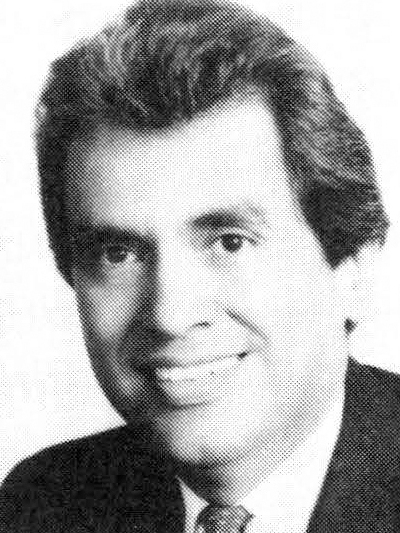
- Official portrait, 1986

Member of the California State Assembly from the 55th district
- In office December 2, 1974 – December 20, 1985
- Preceded by: Leon D. Ralph
- Succeeded by: Richard Polanco

Member of the California State Assembly from the 48th district
- In office January 8, 1973 – November 30, 1974
- Preceded by: Bill Brophy
- Succeeded by: Leon D. Ralph

Member of the Los Angeles City Council from the 14th district
- In office December 21, 1985 – June 30, 1999
- Preceded by: Arthur K. Snyder
- Succeeded by: Nick Pacheco

Assistant President Pro Tempore of the Los Angeles City Council
- In office July 1, 1993 – June 30, 1995
- Preceded by: Joan Milke Flores
- Succeeded by: Mike Hernandez

Personal details
- Born: May 15, 1943 Boyle Heights, California, U.S.
- Died: August 13, 2024 (aged 81) Los Angeles, California, U.S.
- Party: Democratic
- Children: 3
- Education: California State University, Los Angeles (BA); University of Southern California (MPA)
- Occupation: Lobbyist
- Richard Alatorre's voice Richard Alatorre on the cancellation of events due to the 1992 Los Angeles riots Recorded April 30, 1992

Richard Alatorre (May 15, 1943 – August 13, 2024) was an American politician who was a member of the California State Assembly from 1973 to 1985 and the Los Angeles City Council from 1985 to 1999, the second Latino to serve on the council in the 20th century. While working as a lobbyist, he had been called "one of the most influential Latino politicians in the state".

== Early life ==
Alatorre was born on May 15, 1943 in Boyle Heights, California, the son of Joe Alatorre of El Paso, Texas, a repairman at a stove factory, and Mary Alatorre of Arizona, a beautician. He and his sister, Cecelia, were brought up in East Los Angeles.

He began politics early, as he put it, "a student body officer or class officer every semester from junior high school through high school." He attended and graduated from Garfield High School in East Los Angeles, where he was student body president. In 1960 he heard John F. Kennedy speak at East Los Angeles College and began handing out Kennedy fliers and became involved in the campaign of Leopoldo Sanchez, a Latino candidate for judge.

== Education ==
Alatorre earned a Bachelor of Arts degree in sociology from California State University, Los Angeles, and a master's degree in public administration from the University of Southern California.

== Personality ==
Los Angeles Times reporter Bill Boyarsky noted in 1985 that "Alatorre is a player. He likes the game. He knows how to push in public and private. He knows how to deal." As an Assembly member in Sacramento, wrote Times reporter Denise Hamilton, Alatorre earned a reputation as a "hard-nosed deal maker."

Boyarsky described him in 1989:

A slender man of 46, he favors expensive-looking, well-cut Italian suits. ... But his combination of the crude and the pleasant, of bluntness and courtliness, casts an aura that puts off people used to more conventional, or polite, politicians. At City Council meetings, Alatorre slumps in his chair looking bored as his colleagues drone on. He reads the newspapers, sneaks a cigarette at the side of the chambers. And smoking, swearing, always saying, "Hey, man," Alatorre acts as if he never left Garfield High.

== Career ==
=== Early ===
In high school he was hired by a local jeweler to collect past-due debts from customers. He also worked for Philip Montez, who became "one of Alatorre's political mentors" and later the regional director for the U.S. Commission on Civil Rights in Los Angeles.

After college, he taught sociology at California State University, Los Angeles and University of California, Irvine, and night courses in government in the federal prison on Terminal Island. He also worked with gang members and was a community organizer. In addition, he was western regional director for the NAACP Legal Defense and Educational Fund, where he successfully initiated lawsuits on behalf of children, many of whom had been assigned to classes for the mentally disabled because they were Spanish speaking. and in the late 1960s he was a consultant to the U.S. Civil Rights Commission.

=== State Assembly ===
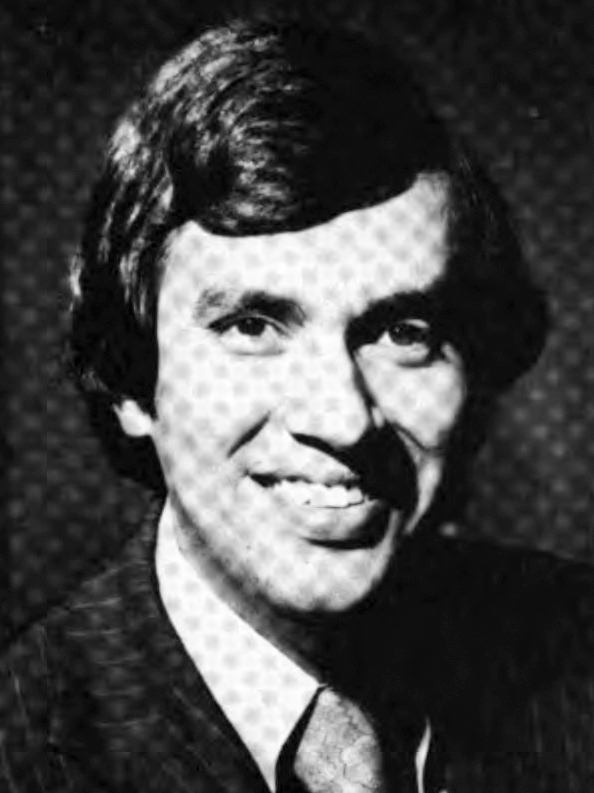
Alatorre in 1975 while serving in the California State Assembly.

Alatorre began his California Assembly career as an aide to Assemblyman Walter Karabian. Alatorre dated Carole Creason when she was working for Walter Karabian and State Senator Alfred Song in 1968. In 1971, he ran as the Democratic candidate for Assembly to succeed David Roberti, who had been advanced to the State Senate. His opponent was Republican Bill Brophy. But the day before the election, shots were fired into Brophy's house and, Alatorre told a reporter, the resulting publicity gave Brophy the boost he needed to win the seat. In 1972 Alatorre ran again, and this time he was elected.

In 1972 he was elected to the California State Assembly, serving 12 years in various capacities, including Chairman on the Select Committee on Farm Labor Violence; Chairman of Human services Committee; Chairman of the historic 1980 Elections and Reapportionment Committee; Founder and Chairman of the Chicano Caucus for the California State Legislature; and Chairman of the Prison Reform Committee. During his tenure in the Assembly, he authored the California Agricultural Labor Relations Act.

In his Assembly years, from 1973 to 1985, Alatorre "proved himself a reliable member of Speaker Willie L. Brown's fund-raising political machine that milks the business community for money needed to elect Democrats." "Back-room powerbrokers" in the Assembly also "put him in charge of fashioning a legislative and congressional reapportionment that gave Latinos their most substantial political representation in history."

He "helped shape the state's farm labor law, which gave migrant workers collective bargaining rights. ... he got the University of California, Irvine School of Medicine to admit more minorities in return for an appropriation for a new teaching hospital."

=== City Council ===
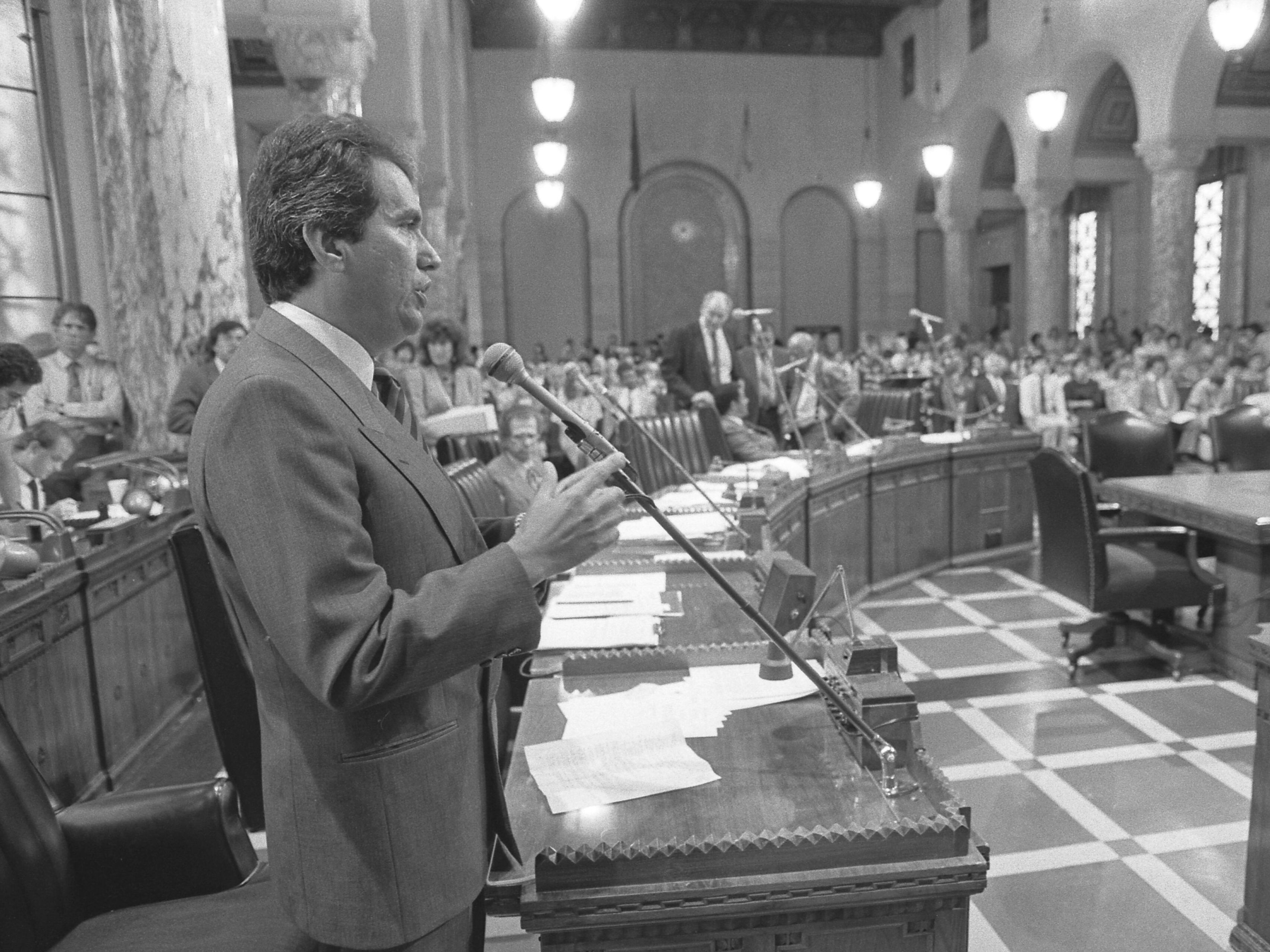
Alatorre addressing the Los Angeles City Council in 1986.

==== Elections ====
Alatorre won a special election in December 1985 by 60 percent of the vote to replace Arthur K. Snyder, who had resigned as Los Angeles City Council District 14 representative and who endorsed Alatorre. The latter was "the first Latino in more than two decades" to be elected to the council, the previous one being Edward R. Roybal, who left in 1962. More than half of the district's 200,000 residents were Latino, but voting strength was historically based in the "mostly Anglo, conservative Eagle Rock area," other neighborhoods being Boyle Heights, Lincoln Heights, El Sereno and Highland Park.

It was said that Alatorre's election to the remainder of Snyder's term "filled a huge void in city politics and government" because a city council "without a Latino representative in American's pre-eminent Hispanic city was something of a civic embarrassment, magnified recently when the U.S. Justice Department filed suit against the city, charging that its reapportionment plan had denied Latino representation."

In Alatorre's successful bid for a full four-year term in 1987, he faced opponents who decried Alatorre's "pro-development" stance.

==== Positions ====
Alatorre was a strong ally of Mayor Tom Bradley and was aligned with pro-development forces. He was a "vocal advocate" of civil rights, and he helped organize shelters for the homeless. He obtained state enterprise zones tax incentives for East Los Angeles. Some of his other positions were:

Redistricting, 1986. Alatorre attempted to gain more influence for Hispanic voters by recommending a redistricting plan that would have moved the 13th District of City Councilman Michael Woo, a Chinese-American, away from Woo's power base in Hollywood and—"much against his will—into a two-thirds Latino district." The move was deemed unnecessary when Councilman Howard Finn died and his District 1 was moved into Northeast Los Angeles to give Latinos a clear shot at electing another council member.

Eagle Rock, 1987. The councilman proposed a year-long moratorium on the construction of mini-malls on Colorado Boulevard in Eagle Rock, but "too late to save a 72-year-old brick building" that was torn down at Townsend Avenue.

Museums, 1987. He asked the state attorney-general to review actions of the directors of the Southwest Museum and of the County Museum of Natural History, contending that "family relationships may have played a role" in merger negotiations between the two agencies. He noted that members of two families served on both boards.

=== Other public agencies ===
Transportation. After leaving the City Council, Alatorre was named by Mayor Tom Bradley to the Los Angeles Regional Transportation Commission, the forerunner to the Los Angeles County Metropolitan Transportation Authority; he became the first chairman of the MTA, and during his tenure championed the passage of the Gold Line and led the successful approval of the extension of the light rail into East Los Angeles. In that position, Alatorre tapped "lobbyists and contractors, all big campaign contributors" for more than $500,000 to benefit a children's charity he had created—and which hired an event planning firm founded by Angie Alatorre, his wife. After a Times investigation, the councilman was fined $8,000 by state and local watchdog agencies for "improperly intervening" on behalf of his wife's firm before a city licensing agency. It was the maximum fine allowed under state and local laws.

Insurance. In 1999, he was appointed by a State Senate committee headed by Senator John Burton to a $114,000-a-year job on the California Unemployment Insurance Appeals Board, but he resigned in 2001 after he agreed to plead guilty to tax evasion (below).

== Legal problems ==
=== Political Reform Act ===
In June 1986 Alatorre was accused of violating the state Political Reform Act in an "unusual civil lawsuit" filed by the city attorney's office in connection with Alatorre's successful race for a City Council seat in 1985. The suit contended that Alatorre and the treasurers of his two political finance committees, including his sister, had used money from his State Assembly campaign fund to run for City Council. The treasurers were indicted criminally, but City Attorney James K. Hahn said he lacked criminal evidence against Alatorre, and so Hahn filed the civil action. Alatorre claimed that the city attorney gave him "vague advice" and that he was a "guinea pig because his was the first election conducted under the city's new campaign law.

The case was settled in August when Alatorre admitted "personal negligence" and agreed to pay a record $141,966 in fines, of which $5,000 was to come from his own pocket. His campaign committees paid a $40,000 fine and returned $83,000 to his Assembly campaign fund, and he had to return $32,000 to contributors. Criminal charges against the aides were dismissed.

=== Conflict of interest ===
In April 1987, the state's Fair Political Practices Commission said it was investigating whether Alatorre violated state laws regarding conflict of interest when he recommended that The East Los Angeles Community Union (TELACU) be awarded a $722,000 city grant to provide dial-a-ride service—this after accepting a $1,000 fee for speaking at one of the group's meetings. In February 1988 he was fined $2,000 when he admitted to the charge.

=== Child custody ===
In 1998 Alatorre and his wife, Angie, were involved in a bitter child custody dispute over the fate of Angie's nine-year-old niece, who had been living with them since the death of her mother, Angie's sister, Belinda. In considering the fitness of the Alatorre home, Superior Court Judge Henry W. Shatford was confronted with allegations that Alatorre had recently abused cocaine. Under sharp questioning, Alatorre said he was a recovering cocaine addict but had stopped using the drug nine years previously. The claim was contradicted by a court-ordered drug test that Alatorre failed. In the end, the judge ordered that the girl, then 10, should be returned to the Alatorres, in part because she had enjoyed "love, caring, affection and security" with them. Alatorre was at that point in a court-monitored drug rehabilitation program.

=== Tax evasion ===
In 1998, federal authorities were investigating how Alatorre came up with more than $12,000, "much of it in cash," to use as a down payment on his Eagle Rock home. They were also looking into work on the Alatorre home that was financed by The East Los Angeles Community Union (TELACU), a nonprofit community development corporation with profit-making subsidiaries, which had sought "millions of dollars in MTA (Metropolitan Transportation Authority) and city deals backed by the councilman."

In 2001 he agreed to plead guilty to felony tax evasion, admitting to not reporting almost $42,000 he received from individuals attempting to influence him in his official duties. A plea bargain resulted in eight months of home detention and three years of supervised release.

=== Lobbying ===
After his political career ended, Alatorre became a lobbyist and consultant. Los Angeles County District Attorney Steve Cooley announced in November 2008 that he was looking into Alatorre's lobbying work. The news came a year after the Los Angeles Times reported that Alatorre "had contacted at least seven city departments and five council members on behalf of various businesses without registering as a lobbyist." He later filed the registration forms, and the inquiry was dropped.

== Personal life and death ==
Alatorre was married to Angie and had two sons, Derrick and Darrell, and a daughter, Melinda.

Alatorre died from cancer at his home in Eagle Rock, Los Angeles, on August 13, 2024, at the age of 81.

== Legacies ==
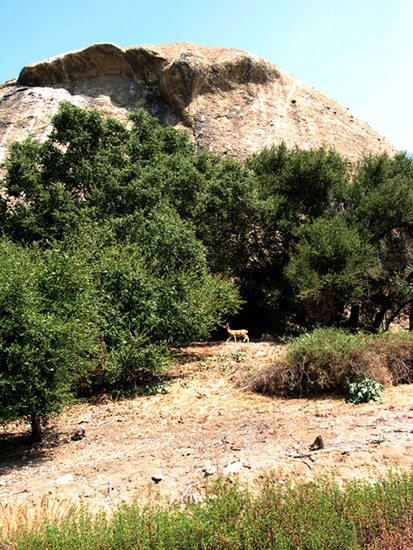
Eagle Rock.

- Alatorre-Eagle Rock View Park at the base of the landmark Eagle Rock in Northeast Los Angeles was named for Alatorre. It was planned to be a "passive use facility with benches, some nature paths and a small parking lot off Scholl Canyon Road."
- A Richard Alatorre swimming pool exists at 4721 Klamath Street in El Sereno.
- A collection of his official papers resides at the California State University, Los Angeles Department of Special Collections and Archives.

== See also ==
- Torristas and Molinistas

Preceded by Arthur K. Snyder	Los Angeles City Council; 14th District; 1985–1999	Succeeded by Nick Pacheco
Preceded by Joan Milke Flores	Assistant President Pro Tempore of the Los Angeles City Council; 1993–1995	Succeeded by Mike Hernandez
