= Nick Pacheco =

American politician (born 1964)

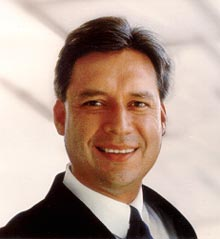

Member of the Los Angeles City Council from the 14th district
- In office July 1, 1999 – June 30, 2003
- Preceded by: Richard Alatorre
- Succeeded by: Antonio Villaraigosa

Member of the Los Angeles Charter Reform Commission
- In office 1997–1999
- Mayor: Richard J. Riordan

Personal details
- Born: Lauro Pacheco Jr. February 9, 1964 (age 62) Los Angeles, California, U.S.
- Party: Democratic
- Education: University of California, Berkeley (BA); Loyola Marymount University (JD)
- Occupation: Lawyer

Lauro "Nick" Pacheco Jr. (born February 9, 1964) is an American disbarred lawyer, politician, and a member of the Democratic Party. Pacheco served as a member of the Los Angeles City Council (1999–2003). Prior to serving on the Los Angeles City Council, Pacheco served as an Elected Charter Reform Commissioner (1997–1999) for the same district he served as Councilmember. He also worked for the Los Angeles County District Attorney's office as a Deputy District Attorney (1995–1999).

== Early life ==
Pacheco was born and raised in Los Angeles in the community of Boyle Heights. His parents are both immigrants from Mexico. His father worked as a steelworker and his mother was a homemaker.

Pacheco received a Bachelor of Arts degree in religious studies and Chicano studies from the University of California, Berkeley in 1988, and a Juris Doctor from Loyola Law School, Los Angeles in 1994. Prior to attending the University of California, Berkeley, he attended Loyola High School, graduating in 1982.

== Career ==
Pacheco served on the Los Angeles City Council, representing the 14th District from 1999 to 2003. While on the council, he established a jogging path around a cemetery (Evergreen Cemetery Jogging Path) that included the use of recycled tires as part of the sidewalk. He also created the Affordable Housing Trust Fund in the City of Los Angeles as chair of the council's Housing and Community Redevelopment Committee.

As chair of the council's Budget Committee he established the Neighborhood Prosecutor program that focuses on quality-of-life crimes in each neighborhood. Under this program each police division in the city has a specific Deputy City Attorney assigned to identify and prosecute quality-of-life crimes (graffiti, prostitution, drag-racing, etc.) that harm each neighborhood.

Pacheco ran for district attorney against incumbent Steve Cooley in 2004 and lost by 44 percentage points. He returned to private practice, handling mostly family-law cases. Pacheco ran to reclaim his old seat in 2005 but lost to José Huizar.

After leaving politics, Pacheco continued to practice law in Los Angeles and Mission Hills.

Pacheco failed to participate in Case No. 16-O-17420-YDR, a disciplinary proceeding and as set forth in the Rules of Procedure of the State Bar, he was disbarred effective September 9, 2018. The California State Bar maintains a page for each lawyer and his indicates that he was ineligible to practice law starting on September 1, 2017, and disbarred on September 9, 2018.

=== Lira v. Nick Pacheco Law Group ===
In 2015, his law firm in Mission Hills was sued by two former employees, Carlos and Rico Lira, who alleged the following: that Pacheco failed to pay all of their wages, that his employee, defendant Juan Jaramillo, demanded that they contribute $500 to Rudy Martinez's City Council campaign (which later became the subject of an investigation by the Los Angeles City Ethics Commission), that his employees made racially charged statements to them, and that his nonlawyer sales staff improperly gave legal advice to clients by falsely promising that their homes could be saved from foreclosure. They alleged to have been fired after they complained about this misconduct, and that Pacheco later defamed them to their prospective employer.

Pacheco filed special motions to strike a majority of their claims under Code of Civil Procedure section 425.16,1 contending that the statements to their prospective employer were made in anticipation of litigation, and that the remainder of the claims arose from his protected activity in representing his clients, and in connection with the Ethics Commission investigation. He also produced evidence that they were terminated because they falsified Rocio's employment verification forms, and therefore the termination resulted from Pacheco's effort to comply with federal immigration law.

The 8th Division, Second District of the California Courts of Appeal was not persuaded by Pacheco's legal arguments, denied his appeal, thus leaving the lower court's order denying his special motion's to strike in effect.

== Personal life ==
He was married to Marisela Alvarez, but the pair divorced. They had two daughters and a son.

== Electoral history ==
2004 primary election, Los Angeles County District Attorney
Candidate	Votes	%
Steve Cooley	596,616	59.15
Nick Pacheco	151,360	15.01
Denise B. Moehlman	91,667	9.09
Tom Higgins	71,068	7.05
Roger Carrick	68,978	6.84
Anthony G. Patchett	28,921	2.87

Preceded by Richard Alatorre	Los Angeles City Councilmen; 14th district 1999—03	Succeeded by Antonio Villaraigosa
