= 1980 Los Angeles County Board of Supervisors election =

1980 Los Angeles County Board of Supervisors elections

3 of the 5 seats of the Los Angeles County Board of Supervisors
	Majority party	Minority party
Party	Republican	Democratic
Seats before	1	4
Seats won	2	0
Seats after	3	2
Seat change	▲2	▼2

The 1980 Los Angeles County Board of Supervisors election was held on November 4, 1980, coinciding with the 1980 United States presidential election. Two of the five seats (for the Fourth and Fifth Districts) of the Los Angeles County Board of Supervisors was contested in this election.

== Results ==
=== Fourth District ===
1980 Los Angeles County Board of Supervisors election District 4

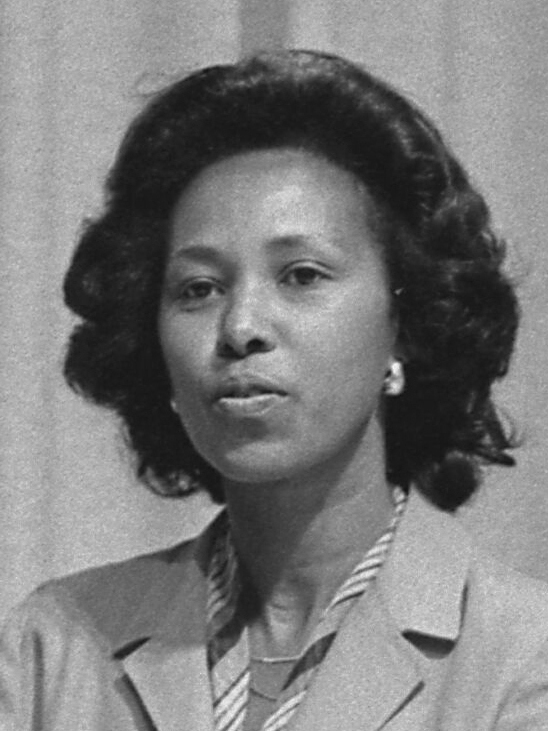
Candidate	Deane Dana	Yvonne Brathwaite Burke
Popular vote	270,758	241,860
Percentage	52.81%	47.18%
Supervisor before election
Yvonne Brathwaite Burke
Supervisor
Deane Dana

4th District supervisorial election, 1980
Candidate	Votes	%
Deane Dana	270,758	52.81
Yvonne Brathwaite Burke (incumbent)	241,860	47.18
Total votes	512,618	100.00

=== Fifth District ===
1980 Los Angeles County Board of Supervisors election District 5

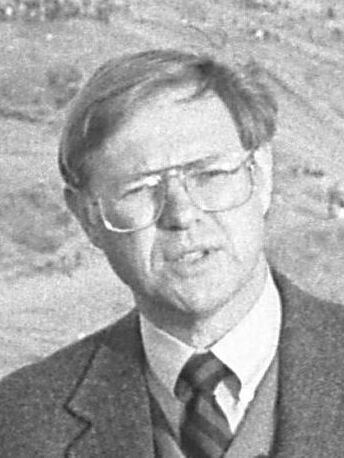

Candidate	Michael D. Antonovich	Baxter Ward
Popular vote	306,545	250,211
Percentage	55.21%	44.76%
Supervisor before election
Baxter Ward
Supervisor
Michael D. Antonovich

5th District supervisorial election, 1980
Candidate	Votes	%
Michael D. Antonovich	306,545	55.21
Baxter Ward (incumbent)	250,211	44.76
Total votes	556,756	100.00
