= 1996 Los Angeles County Board of Supervisors election =

1996 Los Angeles County Board of Supervisors elections

3 of the 5 seats of the Los Angeles County Board of Supervisors
	Majority party	Minority party
Party	Democratic	Republican
Seats before	3	2
Seats won	2	0
Seats after	3	2
Seat change	Steady	Steady

The 1996 Los Angeles County Board of Supervisors elections were held on November 5, 1996, coinciding with the 1996 United States presidential election. One of the five seats (for the Fourth District) of the Los Angeles County Board of Supervisors was contested in this election.

== Results ==
=== Fourth District ===
1996 Los Angeles County Board of Supervisors election District 4

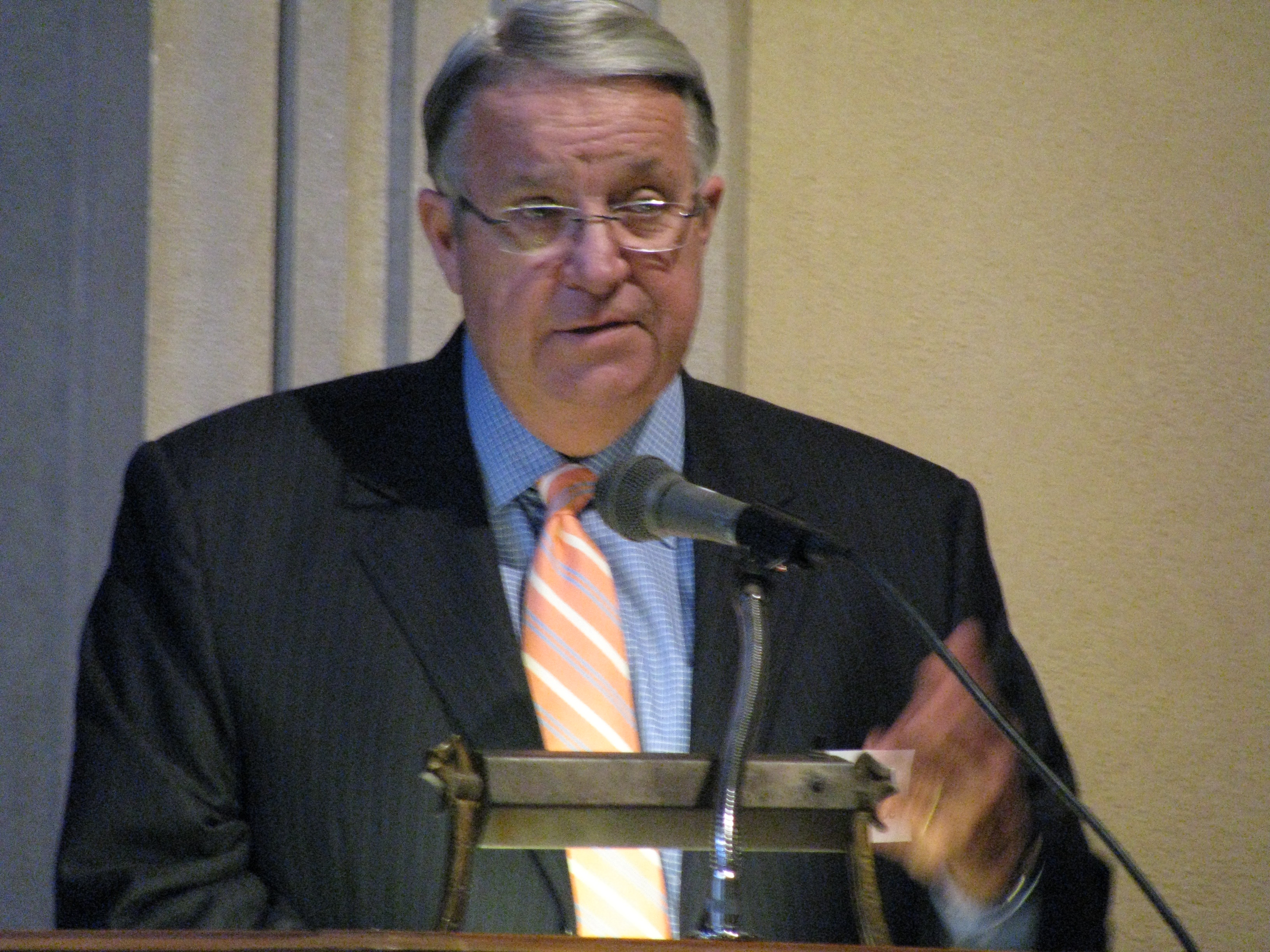

Candidate	Don Knabe	Gordana M. Swanson
Popular vote	309,598	190,859
Percentage	61.86%	38.13%
Supervisor before election
Deane Dana
Supervisor
Don Knabe

4th District supervisorial election, 1996
Candidate	Votes	%
Don Knabe	309,598	61.86
Gordana M. Swanson	190,859	38.13
Turnout	{{{votes}}}	%
Total votes	500,457	100.00
