= Don Knabe Community Regional Park =

Park in Cerritos, California

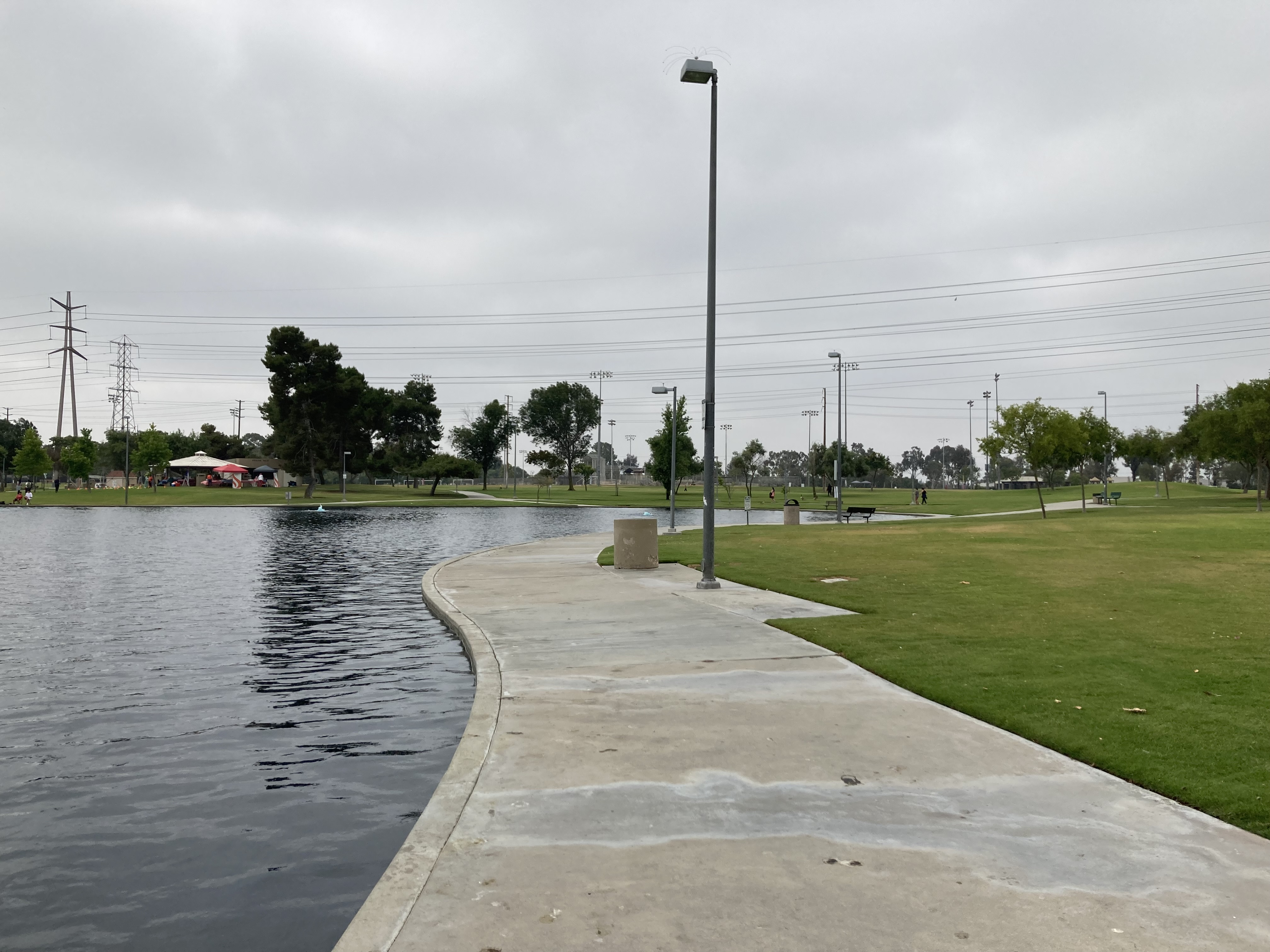
- A view of the park's lake

- Location within the Los Angeles metropolitan area Location within California Location within the United States
- Type: Urban
- Location: Los Angeles County, California, United States
- Nearest city: Cerritos, California
- Coordinates: 33.850185°N 118.060498°W
- Area: 84 acres (34 ha)
- Etymology: Don Knabe
- Operator: Los Angeles County Department of Parks and Recreation
- Open: 6:30am - 9:00pm, Mon-Sun

Don Knabe Community Regional Park, previously known as Cerritos Community Regional Park, is an urban park in Cerritos, California. It contains a few large sculptures, two fishing lakes, and many other amenities.

The park was retitled to its current name on November 30, 2016, to honor the former supervisor Don Knabe. It was recommended by former mayor and supervisor Michael D. Antonovich.

== Recreation ==
The park offers the following services:

- Amphitheaters
- Badminton
- Barbeques
- Baseball
- Basketball
- Concerts
- Concession stands
- Fishing
- Flag football
- Kumdo
- Movie screenings
- Outdoor gyms
- Pickleball
- Picnic tables
- Public toilets
- Skate parks
- Skateboarding
- Swimming pools
- Table tennis
- Tennis
- Volleyball
- Water polo
- Yoga
- Zumba

Both fishing lakes are mainly stocked with trout during the winter and spring seasons and catfish during the summer. Largemouth bass, carp, and bluegill are also found in the lake.

The swimming pool is 50 metres (160 ft) in size and is open only during the summer.

A 1.4 loop trail on the border of the park exists. It is popular for people road biking, and dogs are allowed on a leash.
