= Edmund Edelman =

American politician

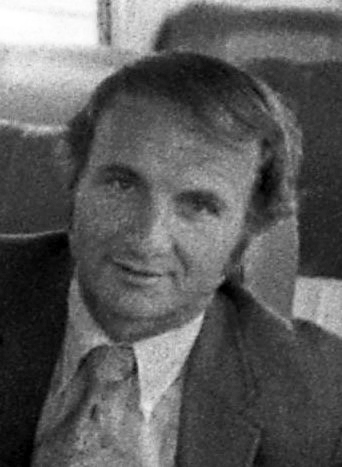
- Edelman in 1972

Member of the Los Angeles County Board of Supervisors
- In office December 1, 1974 – December 1, 1994
- Preceded by: Ernest E. Debs
- Succeeded by: Zev Yaroslavsky

Chair of Los Angeles County
- In office December 8, 1992 – December 7, 1993
- Preceded by: Deane Dana
- Succeeded by: Yvonne Brathwaite Burke
- In office December 6, 1988 – December 21, 1989
- Preceded by: Deane Dana
- Succeeded by: Peter F. Schabarum
- In office December 4, 1984 – December 3, 1985
- Preceded by: Michael D. Antonovich (Mayor)
- Succeeded by: Peter F. Schabarum
- In office December 2, 1980 – December 7, 1982
- Preceded by: Kenneth Hahn
- Succeeded by: Peter F. Schabarum

Chair Pro Tem of Los Angeles County
- In office December 3, 1991 – December 8, 1992
- Preceded by: Deane Dana
- Succeeded by: Yvonne Brathwaite Burke
- In office December 8, 1987 – December 21, 1988
- Preceded by: Michael D. Antonovich (Mayor Pro Tem)
- Succeeded by: Peter F. Schabarum
- In office December 6, 1983 – December 4, 1984
- Preceded by: Deane Dana
- Succeeded by: Peter F. Schabarum
- In office December 2, 1975 – December 5, 1978
- Preceded by: Baxter Ward
- Succeeded by: James A. Hayes

Member of the Los Angeles City Council from the 5th district
- In office July 1, 1965 – December 1, 1974
- Preceded by: Rosalind Wiener Wyman
- Succeeded by: Zev Yaroslavsky

Personal details
- Born: September 27, 1930 Los Angeles, California, U.S.
- Died: September 12, 2016 (aged 85) Los Angeles, California, U.S.
- Party: Democratic
- Spouse: Mari Mayer (m. 1968)
- Children: 2
- Education: University of California, Los Angeles (BA, LL.B)

Edmund D. Edelman (September 27, 1930 – September 12, 2016) was an American attorney and politician. He served as a member of the Los Angeles City Council from 1965 to 1974 and the Los Angeles County Board of Supervisors from 1974 to 1994.

== Early life and education ==
Born in Los Angeles, Edelman attended Burnside Avenue Elementary School, Los Angeles High School and Beverly Hills High School. He grew up in a traditional Jewish family.

He served in the Navy in 1951 and 1952, after which he attended University of California, Los Angeles, where he graduated in 1954 with a Bachelor of Arts degree in political science. He earned a Bachelor of Laws degree from the UCLA School of Law in 1958.

== Career ==
He was an arbitrator with the Federal Mediation and Conciliation Service, deputy legislative counsel with the California State Legislature in 1961 and 1962, counselor to the Subcommittee on Education of the U.S. House of Representatives in 1962 and 1963, and special assistant to the general counsel of the National Labor Relations Board in 1963 and 1964. He was then elected to the Los Angeles City Council.

=== City Council ===
Edelman engaged in a rough election race to unseat incumbent Councilwoman Rosalind Wyman in the 5th District. Supported by Mayor Sam Yorty, he won the runoff vote of May 25, 1965, by 37,291 to 12,201 and became the then-youngest member of the council at age 35. His residency had been unsuccessfully challenged in court on the grounds that he had lived in Washington, D.C., for 2 1/2 years.

Wyman and her husband, former Democratic National Committee member Eugene L. Wyman, sued Edelman for libel in 1965, claiming that his campaign had issued a brochure linking them with organized crime and using political power for personal gain. They asked for $400,000, but in the end, settled out of court in 1970 after Edelman sent a $5,000 check to a scholarship fund at Northwestern University.

Edelman was reelected in 1969 over minor opposition, and in 1973 he would have faced opposition from actor and conservative Republican William Lundigan, but the latter failed to turn in enough valid petition signatures, so the councilman went into that race unopposed.

=== Board of Supervisors ===
Edelman was elected in November 1974 to the Los Angeles County Board of Supervisors over fellow Councilman John Ferraro. He succeeded Ernest E. Debs, a conservative Democrat and outspoken opponent of the 1960s counterculture among youth, who retired.

Edelman led successful drives to establish several new departments and agencies, among them the Department of Children and Family Services, the Department of Consumer Affairs, and the Community Youth Gang Services agency. He has been recognized for his support of social services agencies dedicated to aiding the homeless, battered women, public transportation, abused children, the disabled and the mentally ill, people with AIDS, and those recovering from substance abuse.

== Personal life ==
Edelman married Mari Mayer in 1968. They had two daughters, Erica Nancy and Emily Rose. Edelman died in Los Angeles on September 12, 2016, at the age of 85.

Preceded by Rosalind Wiener Wyman	Los Angeles City Council; 5th District; 1965–74	Succeeded by Zev Yaroslavsky
Preceded by Ernest E. Debs	Los Angeles County Board of Supervisors; 3rd District; 1974–94	Succeeded by Zev Yaroslavsky
Preceded by Kenneth Hahn	Chair of Los Angeles County; 1992–93; 1988-89; 1984-85; 1980-82	Succeeded by Yvonne Brathwaite Burke
Preceded by Deane Dana	Chair of Los Angeles County; 1992–93; 1988-89; 1984-85; 1980-82	Succeeded by Peter F. Schabarum
Preceded by Michael D. Antonovich (Mayor)	Chair of Los Angeles County; 1992–93; 1988-89; 1984-85; 1980-82	Succeeded by Peter F. Schabarum
Preceded by Deane Dana	Chair Pro Tem of Los Angeles County; 1991–92; 1987-88; 1983-84; 1975-78	Succeeded by Yvonne Brathwaite Burke
Preceded by Michael D. Antonovich (Mayor Pro Tem)	Chair Pro Tem of Los Angeles County; 1991–92; 1987-88; 1983-84; 1975-78	Succeeded by Peter F. Schabarum
Preceded by Baxter Ward	Chair Pro Tem of Los Angeles County; 1991–92; 1987-88; 1983-84; 1975-78	Succeeded by James A. Hayes
