= United States House Select Committee on the House Beauty Shop =

Former US Congressional committee

The House Beauty Shop Committee (officially known as the House Select Committee on the Beauty Shop) was a special committee of the United States House of Representatives which existed from 1967 to 1979. It was initially established pursuant to H.Res. 1000 and introduced by Representative Martha Griffiths, a Democrat representing Michigan's 17th district. Griffiths, along with Edith Green (a Democrat from Oregon's 3rd district) and Catherine May (a Republican from Washington's 4th district), became the first members of the committee. It was formed to oversee and modernize the operations of the House Beauty Shop, a beauty salon located in the Cannon House Office Building in the United States Capitol.

At the time of its establishment, the House Beauty Shop Committee was the smallest and least known of the House of Representatives' 57 committees. It was also the first committee to be co-chaired by two women. In the late 1970s, the committee was absorbed into the United States House Committee on House Administration.

== History ==
The House Beauty Shop originated as a privately owned and independently operated beauty salon located in the Longworth House Office Building, one of three main office buildings on the Capitol devoted to the House of Representatives. Established in 1932 by beautician Mabel Solomon, it primarily served the women of Capitol Hill, including members of Congress, their wives, and congressional staffers. By the 1960s, the shop was estimated to have earned nearly $150,000 annually. It benefited from the fact that the House of Representatives provided space and utilities for free.

By 1967, however, Solomon's health complications led to frequent absences. Even prior to her departure, some House members had been concerned about the lax oversight over the beauty shop's operations. To address these concerns, then-House Speaker John W. McCormack ordered an investigation into the beauty shop, which was led by Griffiths and May. In response to the scrutiny, Solomon abruptly retired, closing the shop and packing up thousands of dollars' worth of equipment. McCormack then decided to form the House Beauty Shop Committee to investigate the situation further and provide recommendations on how to restore the beauty shop. He named Griffiths, May, and Rep. Edith Green to the committee and provided $15,000 from the contingency fund as a bridge loan.

The House Beauty Shop Committee hired a new manager to run the shop, who in turn hired 18 beauticians and manicurists and relocated the shop from the Longworth building to the much larger Cannon Building. Within a few years, the beauty shop had been revitalized; it repaid the $15,000 loan and was soon turning a profit.

In 1975, Yvonne Burke, a Democrat representing California's 28th district, succeeded Griffiths as chair of the House Beauty Shop Committee. Under her leadership, the committee successfully secured pay and benefits parity with other House staffers for the beauty shop's employees. Burke's proposal, H. Res 315, was introduced in 1977. It abolished the House Beauty Shop Committee, folding its responsibilities into the United States House Committee on House Administration; it also ensured that House Beauty Shop employees were treated like other House employees. It was enacted by the House of Representatives as part of the 1979 appropriations bill.

As part of the House Speaker Newt Gingrich's "Contract with America", the House of Representatives privatized the House Beauty Salon in 1995. Under the new approach, the House of Representatives' Chief Administrative Officer awards a three-year renewable contract to a private contractor, who in turn pays the House monthly rent and manages the operations of the beauty shop. Though it still caters to House members and staffers, the beauty salon is available to members of the general public.

== Committee chairs ==
Image	Chairman	Party	State	Years
	Martha Griffiths	Democratic	Michigan	1967-1975
	Yvonne Brathwaite Burke	Democratic	California	1975-1979

== Historical members ==
- Martha Griffiths (Michigan) (chair) (1967–1975)
- Yvonne Brathwaite Burke (California) (chair) (1975–defunct)
- Edith Green (Oregon)
- Catherine May (Washington state) (1967–1970)
- Margaret Heckler (Massachusetts) (1970–1979)
