= Samuel Arbuckle =

American politician

- Occupation: Politician

Samuel Arbuckle (1804-1874) was an early California politician and pioneer to Los Angeles. He served on the first Los Angeles County Board of Supervisors in 1852. He also served as the first Chair of Los Angeles County in 1852.

The first County Supervisors in 1852 for Los Angeles were Jefferson Hunt, Julian A. Chavez, Francisco P. Temple, Manuel Requena, and Samuel Arbuckle.

== Personal information ==
Arbuckle was born on September 25, 1804, in Cheltenham Township, Pennsylvania, where he spent his childhood and worked on his family's farm.

== Career ==
Arbuckle moved to Los Angeles, California where he eventually became one of the leading merchants in the area. Arbuckle focused on buying and selling goods ranging from real estate property to produce. His success within the business community lead to his success in getting elected as county supervisor. did not go unnoticed in the political circles, leading to his election as county supervisor. Arbuckle was elected as county supervisor in 1852 and served for one one-year term. After his term as county supervisor, Arbuckle went back to working on his business.

== Death ==
Samuel Arbuckle died on June 27, 1874, at age 69.
