= El Camino (train) =

Overview
- Status: Discontinued
- First service: February 14, 1978
- Last service: August 12, 1978
- Successor: San Diegan
- Former operator(s): Amtrak

Route
- Line(s) used: Surf Line

Technical
- Rolling stock: 5 coaches; 2 tavern-lounges; 1 dome-observation
- Track owner(s): ATSF

The El Camino was a set of lightweight streamlined railcars owned by Los Angeles County in the 1970s and 1980s. The county acquired the cars to bootstrap a proposed commuter rail service between Los Angeles and Orange County. This effort, spearheaded by County Supervisor Baxter Ward, was unsuccessful. The equipment saw limited use on Amtrak's San Diegan in 1978 and was sold in 1985.

== History ==
The 1970s saw a renewed interest in the United States in commuter rail as rising gas prices, pollution, and traffic congestion made driving less attractive. Local service in Los Angeles had ended on April 8, 1961, when the Pacific Electric discontinued operations. Baxter Ward had been elected to the Los Angeles County Board of Supervisors in 1972 and used his position to push the development of transit in Los Angeles.

Ward proposed running a commuter train between Union Station in Los Angeles and Orange County over the Atchison, Topeka and Santa Fe Railway's Surf Line. Amtrak already operated multiple trains over this route to San Diego (the San Diegan), but the timings were not convenient for commuters. At the time Amtrak was prohibited by statute from operating commuter services. At Ward's urging the Board of Supervisors voted 3–2 to acquire 1940s railcars from the Oregon, Pacific and Eastern Railway at a cost of $230,000. The county spent an additional $1.8 million to refurbish the equipment.

Ward's plan for commuter service in Orange County foundered on opposition from the ATSF, which refused to operate the train and was opposed to any use of its tracks for commuter rail. As an alternative, the county, with support from the California Department of Transportation (Caltrans), arranged with Amtrak to place the equipment in service between Los Angeles and San Diego, supplementing the existing San Diegan service. The train made its first run on February 14, 1978. Daily ridership was 100, well below expectations. At the conclusion of the trial on August 12 the equipment was withdrawn and replaced by regular Amfleet equipment. Although a failure as a commuter service, the El Camino had led to a permanent expansion of Los Angeles–San Diego service.

After its withdrawal the equipment was stored in Bell, California. Ward was defeated for re-election in 1980. The failure of the El Camino played a major role in the campaign with his opponents using derisive sobriquets such as "Baxter Ward's Choo-Choo." The county put the equipment up for sale and refused to release it for use on the short-lived CalTrain commuter service to Oxnard. The Alaska Railroad contemplated purchasing the equipment in 1984 but ultimately declined. In 1985 the county sold it to a tourist railroad in Mexico for $365,000. Commuter rail service in Orange County began again in 1990 with the inauguration of the Orange County Commuter.

== Rolling stock ==
Los Angeles County purchased eight railcars from the Oregon, Pacific and Eastern Railway, a tourist railroad: five ex-Illinois Central coaches, two ex-Milwaukee Road tavern-lounges, and the Silver Planet, an ex-Western Pacific dome sleeper-observation car. The tavern-lounges or "Tap-Lounges" had previously served on the Afternoon Hiawatha between Chicago and the Twin Cities. The Silver Planet was part of the Western Pacific's equipment pool for the famed California Zephyr.

The equipment, originally built in the 1940s, used steam heat. Amtrak's newer EMD F40PH locomotives only supported head-end power (HEP), which meant that EMD SDP40F locomotives had to pull it.
