= Peter F. Schabarum =

American politician (1929–2021)

Peter Frank Schabarum
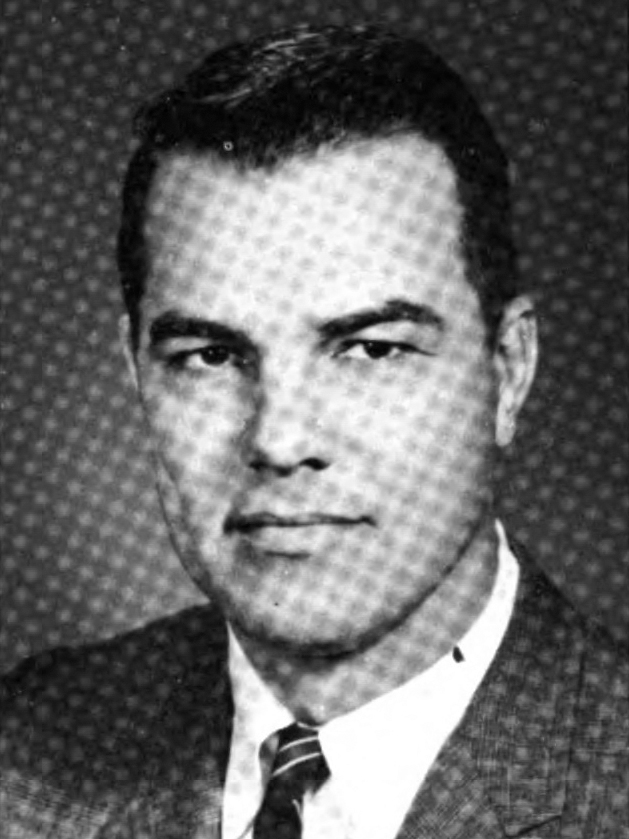
- Official portrait, 1971

Member of the Los Angeles County Board of Supervisors for the 1st district
- In office March 6, 1972 – December 1, 1991
- Preceded by: Frank G. Bonelli
- Succeeded by: Gloria Molina

Chair of Los Angeles County
- In office December 21, 1989 – December 4, 1990
- Preceded by: Edmund D. Edelman
- Succeeded by: Michael D. Antonovich (Mayor)
- In office December 3, 1985 – December 2, 1986
- Preceded by: Edmund D. Edelman
- Succeeded by: Michael D. Antonovich (Mayor)
- In office December 7, 1982 – December 6, 1983
- Preceded by: Edmund D. Edelman
- Succeeded by: Michael D. Antonovich (Mayor)
- In office December 5, 1978 – December 4, 1979
- Preceded by: Kenneth Hahn
- Succeeded by: Kenneth Hahn
- In office December 5, 1972 – December 3, 1974
- Preceded by: Warren M. Dorn
- Succeeded by: James A. Hayes

Chair Pro Tem of Los Angeles County
- In office December 6, 1988 – December 21, 1989
- Preceded by: Edmund D. Edelman
- Succeeded by: Michael D. Antonovich (Mayor Pro Tem)
- In office December 4, 1984 – December 3, 1985
- Preceded by: Edmund D. Edelman
- Succeeded by: Michael D. Antonovich (Mayor Pro Tem)
- In office December 2, 1980 – December 7, 1982
- Preceded by: Baxter Ward
- Succeeded by: Deane Dana

Member of the California State Assembly from the 49th district
- In office January 2, 1967 – March 6, 1972
- Preceded by: Houston I. Flournoy
- Succeeded by: William H. Lancaster

Personal details
- Born: January 9, 1929 Los Angeles, California, U.S.
- Died: August 2, 2021 (aged 92) California, U.S.
- Party: Republican
- Spouse: Gerry Schabarum
- Children: 3
- Education: University of California, Berkeley

Peter Frank Schabarum (January 9, 1929 – August 2, 2021) was an American politician and football player. From 1967 to 1991, he had a political career as a member of the California State Assembly and the Los Angeles County Board of Supervisors.

== Biography ==
Pete Schabarum
No. 88, 44
- Position: Halfback

Personal information
- Listed height: 5 ft 11 in (1.80 m)
- Listed weight: 185 lb (84 kg)

Career information
- High school: Covina High School
- College: California
- NFL draft: 1951: 2nd round, 17th overall pick

Career history
- San Francisco 49ers (1951, 1953–1954)

Awards and highlights
- First-team All-PCC (1950)
- Stats at Pro Football Reference

Schabarum was born January 9, 1929, in Los Angeles. He attended and played football and baseball at the University of California, Berkeley.

He was drafted by the San Francisco 49ers in the 2nd round (17th overall) of the 1951 NFL Draft. He played for the 49ers in 1951, 1953 and 1954, taking time off from his football career to serve in the United States Air Force during the Korean War.

=== Politician ===
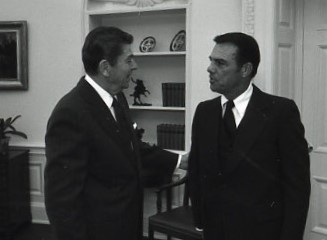
Schabarum (right) with President Ronald Reagan visiting the Oval Office in 1982.

Schabarum represented the 49th district in the California State Assembly from 1967 to 1972. He was appointed to the Los Angeles County Board of Supervisors in March 1972 by Governor Ronald Reagan following the death of incumbent Frank G. Bonelli and elected to the position three months later in a hotly contested special election that pitted him against his former roommate and colleague Assemblyman William Campbell. Schabarum was re-elected in 1974, 1978, 1982 and 1986. He did not seek re-election in 1990, but served three extra months until Feb. 28, 1991 to allow a special election to be held following a court ruling that redrew the boundaries of his district to create a majority-Latino district, later occupied by Gloria Molina.

Schabarum was noted for opposing government unions, supporting privatization of certain county duties, and supporting the decentralization of County government. In addition, he was the leading backer of California's Proposition 140 on the 1990 ballot, which imposed term limits on the California Legislature.

=== Tax evasion conviction ===
When Schabarum left office, his unspent campaign funds were transferred to a nonprofit organization, the Foundation for Citizen Representation. That foundation later transferred $50,000 to a foundation affiliated with the Los Angeles County Museum of Natural History, which then subsequently used the funds for overseas trips for him and his wife after he left office. Prosecutors charged Schabarum with felony grand theft, tax evasion and perjury, but Schabarum took a plea bargain to plead guilty only on the tax evasion charges, receiving three years of probation. Two years later, the charges were reduced to misdemeanors and the probation was terminated early.

=== Personal life ===
Schabarum died of natural causes on August 2, 2021, at the age of 92.

== Parks ==
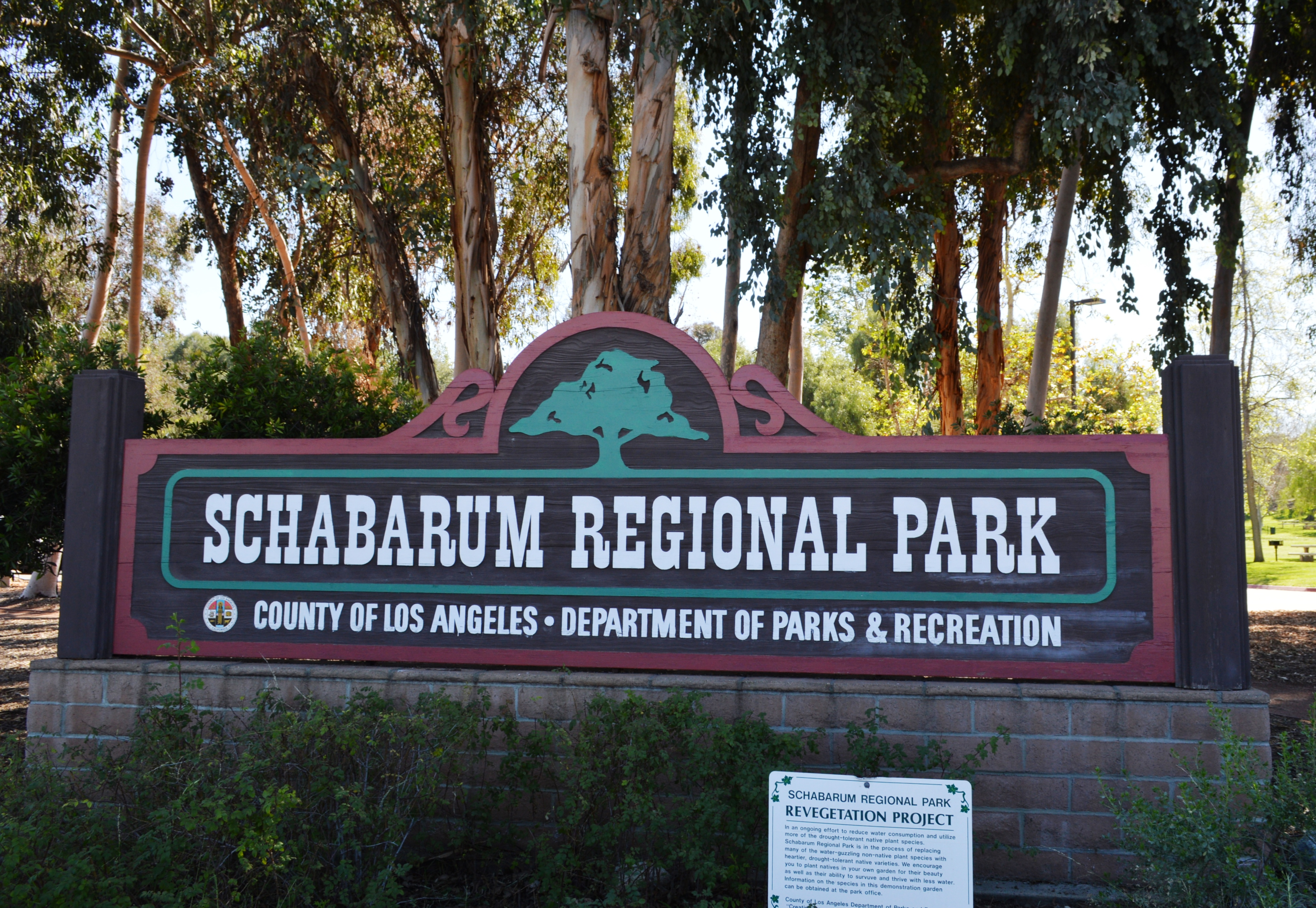
Schabarum Regional Park

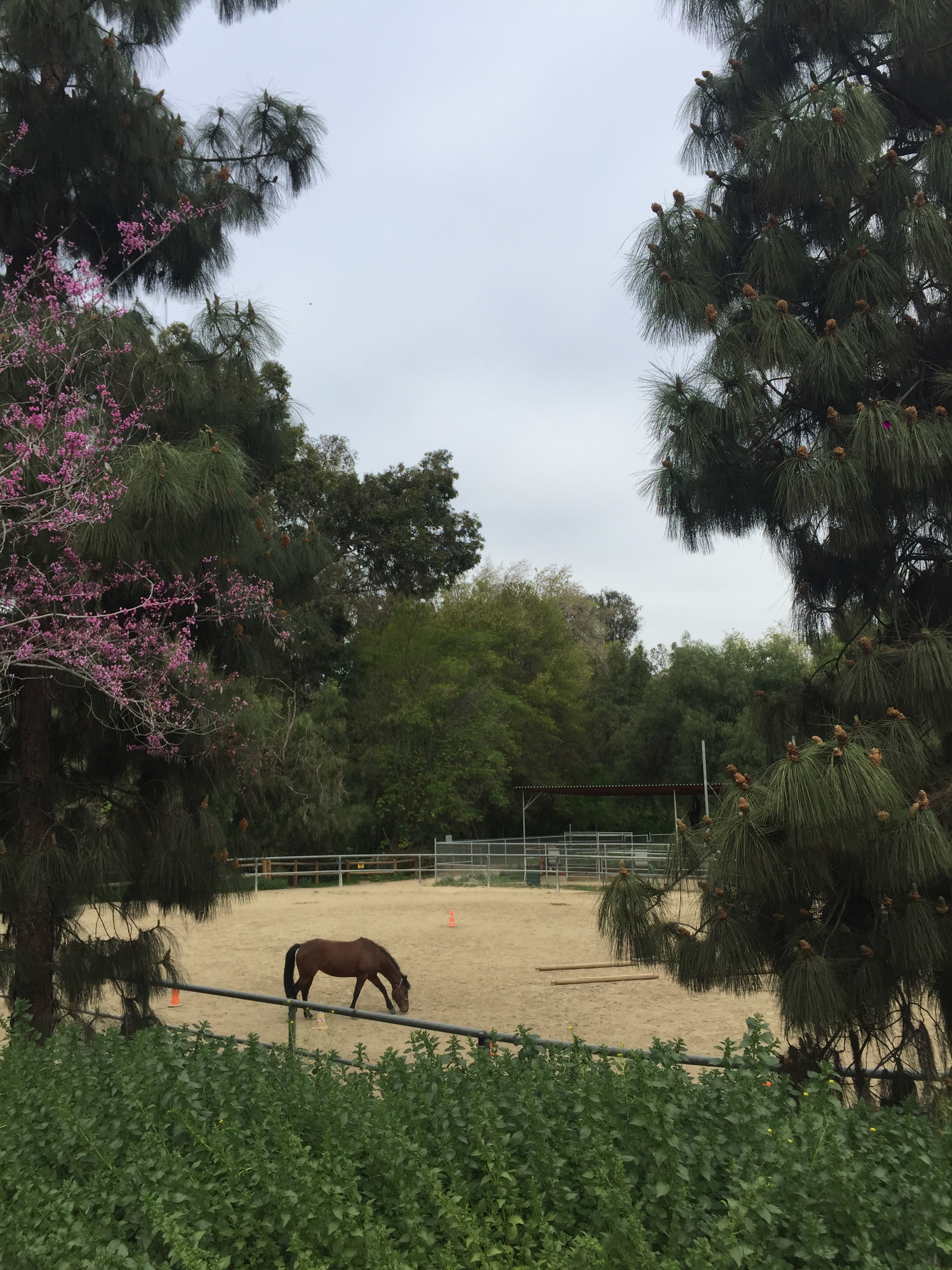
A Horse at the Schabarum Equestrian Center located at the Schabarum Regional Park in Rowland Heights, CA. The park is over 575 acres with 75 acres developed for shared use.

=== Schabarum Regional Park ===
Peter F. Schabarum Regional Park, locally known as Schabarum Regional Park, is located in Rowland Heights, eastern Los Angeles County, California. It is in his former supervisorial district, and named after him. The regional park offers playgrounds, picnic areas, and horseback riding and trails in the surrounding Puente Hills.

Due to the Los Angeles County's budget cuts, the park became one of six regional parks closed on Mondays and Tuesdays, starting from June 30, 2025.

==== Cherry Blossom Festival ====
Schabarum Regional Park is also known for ume and sakura cherry blossoms. 500 ume trees were donated by Kairaku-en in Mito, Ibaraki, Japan when the two parks established a "sister-park" relationship in 1992.

=== Schabarum Trail Park ===
The Schabarum Trail Park is located near Walnut, also in his former supervisorial district.

Political offices
Preceded by Frank G. Bonelli	Los Angeles County Supervisor; First District; 1972 - 1991	Succeeded by Gloria Molina
Preceded by Edmund D. Edelman; Kenneth Hahn; Warren M. Dorn	Chair of Los Angeles County; 1989 - 1990; 1985 - 1986; 1982 - 1983; 1972 - 1974	Succeeded by Michael D. Antonovich (Mayor); Kenneth Hahn; James A. Hayes
Preceded by Edmund D. Edelman; Baxter Ward	Chair Pro Tem of Los Angeles County; 1988 - 1989; 1984 - 1985; 1980 - 1982	Succeeded by Michael D. Antonovich (Mayor Pro Tem); Deane Dana
