= Frank G. Bonelli =

American politician

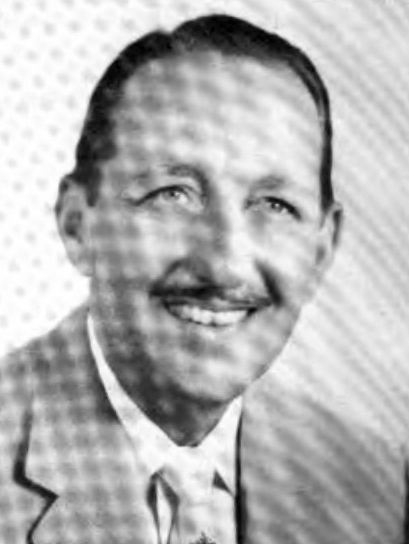
- Official portrait, 1954

Chair of Los Angeles County
- In office December 2, 1958 – December 6, 1960
- Preceded by: John Anson Ford
- Succeeded by: Ernest E. Debs
- In office December 6, 1966 – December 3, 1968
- Preceded by: John Anson Ford
- Succeeded by: Ernest E. Debs

Member of the Los Angeles County Supervisor from the 1st district
- In office June 4, 1958 – February 14, 1972
- Preceded by: Herbert C. Legg
- Succeeded by: Pete Schabarum

Member of the California State Assembly from the 52nd district
- In office December 2, 1953 – June 4, 1958
- Preceded by: Jonathan J. Hollibaugh
- Succeeded by: George A. Willson

Personal details
- Born: October 15, 1906 Grand Junction, Colorado
- Died: February 14, 1972 (aged 65) Lynwood, California
- Party: Democratic
- Spouse: Muriel Moraine (m. 1926)
- Children: 2

Frank G. Bonelli (October 15, 1906 – February 14, 1972) was the Los Angeles County Supervisor of the 1st District from 1958 to 1972, a member of the California State Assembly for the 52nd district from 1953 to 1958, and a member of the Huntington Park, California City Council from 1946 to 1953.

The Frank G. Bonelli Regional Park is named in his honor.

An archive of his correspondence and scrapbooks from his career is held in the Seaver Center for Western History Research, Natural History Museum of Los Angeles County.

Political offices
Preceded by Burton W. Chace	Chair of Los Angeles County; 1958 – 1960; 1966 – 1968	Succeeded by Ernest E. Debs
Preceded by Herbert C. Legg	Los Angeles County Supervisor; First District; 1958 – 1972	Succeeded by Pete Schabarum
Preceded by Jonathan J. Hollibaugh	California's 52nd State Assembly district 1953 – 1958	Succeeded by George A. Willson
