= Chair of Los Angeles County =

Presiding officer

- Seal of Los Angeles

- Flag of Los Angeles

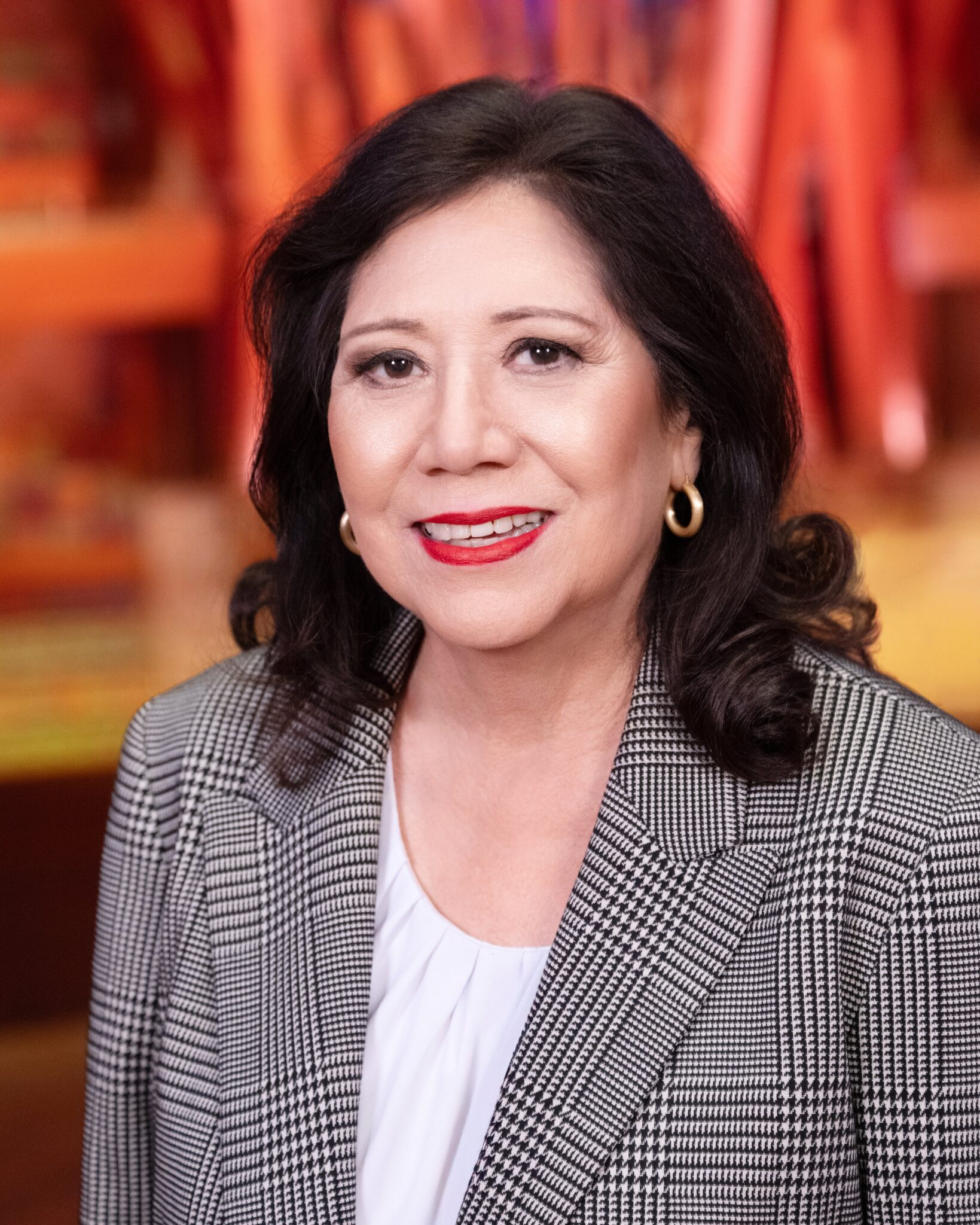
- Incumbent; Hilda Solis since December 2, 2025
- Government of Los Angeles County
- Style: Madam Chair
- Residence: None
- Formation: December 7, 1852
- First holder: Samuel Arbuckle
- Website: https://bos.lacounty.gov/

The Chair of the Los Angeles County also called Chair of the Los Angeles County Board of Supervisors and sometimes called the Mayor of Los Angeles County is responsible for the day-to-day operations of the county government. The chair is the presiding officer for the Los Angeles County Board of Supervisors.

== History ==
The Chair of Los Angeles County serves a term of one year. Upon expiration of the term the duties of the Chair are rotated among the board members by order of seniority until 2015 when the board unanimously move the rotation by order of district. When Chair Pro Tem Sheila Kuehl announced her retirement at the end for her supervisorial term her term would expire before her Chair term would begin Janice Hahn was selected to be Chair and Lindsey Horvath was Chair Pro Tem allowing Horvath to become Chair the following year and Kathryn Barger was selected to be Chair Pro Tem to resume district rotation of the County Chair. The term for a supervisor typically lasts four years, any member will get to serve as chair at least once during the duration of their term. During his or her term of office, the chair has the option of calling himself or herself “mayor”, a practice that was started by Michael D. Antonovich during his tenure as a supervisor. This tradition was not continued by the current incumbents.

== Measure G ==
On November 12, 2024, Los Angeles County voters passed Measure G, which amends the Los Angeles County Charter to create an elected County Executive, which will replace County Chair and CEO in 2028 when the office of County Executive is created.

== Chairs ==
These are the chairs/mayors of the Los Angeles County Board of Supervisors:

No.	Chair/Mayor	Party	Term start	Term end	Notes	Chair/Mayor Pro Tem	Party	Ref.
Los Angeles County Court of Sessions administered The County until 1852 when the creation Board of Supervisors and the County Chair was formed
Chair elected for a 1 year term						Chair Pro Tem office was established in 1974		
1	Samuel Arbuckle	Unknown	December 7, 1852	December 6, 1853	Chair	Chair Pro Tem office was established in 1974		
2	David W. Alexander	Unknown	December 6, 1853	December 5, 1854	Chair	Chair Pro Tem office was established in 1974		
2	David W. Alexander	Unknown	December 5, 1854	December 4, 1855	Chair	Chair Pro Tem office was established in 1974		
3	Thomas Burdick	Unknown	December 4, 1855	December 2, 1856	Chair	Chair Pro Tem office was established in 1974		
4	David Lewis	Unknown	December 2, 1856	December 1, 1857	Chair	Chair Pro Tem office was established in 1974		
5	Jonathan R. Scott	Unknown	December 1, 1857	December 7, 1858	Chair	Chair Pro Tem office was established in 1974		
6	Julian A. Chavez	Unknown	December 7, 1858	December 6, 1859	Chair	Chair Pro Tem office was established in 1974		
7	Stephen C. Foster	Democratic	December 6, 1859	December 4, 1860	Chair	Chair Pro Tem office was established in 1974		
8	Abel Stearns	Unknown	December 4, 1860	December 3, 1861	Chair	Chair Pro Tem office was established in 1974		
9	Benjamin D. Wilson	Unknown	December 3, 1861	December 2, 1862	Chair	Chair Pro Tem office was established in 1974		
10	Julius Morris	Unknown	December 2, 1862	December 1, 1863	Chair	Chair Pro Tem office was established in 1974		
10	Julius Morris	Unknown	December 1, 1863	December 6, 1864	Chair	Chair Pro Tem office was established in 1974		
Chair elected for a 2 year term					Chair	Chair Pro Tem office was established in 1974		
11	Maurice Kremer	Unknown	December 6, 1864	December 4, 1866	Chair	Chair Pro Tem office was established in 1974		
11	Maurice Kremer	Unknown	December 4, 1866	December 1, 1868	Chair	Chair Pro Tem office was established in 1974		
12	Wallace Woodworth	Democratic	December 1, 1868	December 6, 1870	Chair	Chair Pro Tem office was established in 1974		
12	Wallace Woodworth	Democratic	December 6, 1870	December 3, 1872	Chair	Chair Pro Tem office was established in 1974		
13	Hugh Forsman	Unknown	December 3, 1872	December 1, 1874	Chair	Chair Pro Tem office was established in 1974		
14	George Hinds	Unknown	December 1, 1874	December 5, 1876	Chair	Chair Pro Tem office was established in 1974		
14	George Hinds	Unknown	December 5, 1876	December 4, 1877	Chair	Chair Pro Tem office was established in 1974		
15	J.C. Hannon	Unknown	December 4, 1877	December 2, 1879	Chair	Chair Pro Tem office was established in 1974		
16	John J. Morton	Unknown	December 2, 1879	December 7, 1880	Chair	Chair Pro Tem office was established in 1974		
17	Charles Prager	Unknown	December 7, 1880	December 6, 1881	Chair	Chair Pro Tem office was established in 1974		
18	W.F. Cooper	Unknown	December 6, 1881	December 5, 1882	Chair	Chair Pro Tem office was established in 1974		
19	Charles Prager	Unknown	December 5, 1882	December 4, 1883	Chair	Chair Pro Tem office was established in 1974		
19	Charles Prager	Unknown	December 4, 1883	December 1, 1885	Chair	Chair Pro Tem office was established in 1974		
20	Oscar Macy	Republican	December 1, 1885	December 6, 1887	Chair	Chair Pro Tem office was established in 1974		
21	Joseph W. Venable	Unknown	December 6, 1887	December 3, 1889	Chair	Chair Pro Tem office was established in 1974		
22	S.M. Perry	Republican	December 3, 1889	December 1, 1891	Chair	Chair Pro Tem office was established in 1974		
22	S.M. Perry	Republican	December 1, 1891	December 5, 1893	Chair	Chair Pro Tem office was established in 1974		
23	John W. Cook	Unknown	December 5, 1893	December 3, 1895	Chair	Chair Pro Tem office was established in 1974		
24	Andrew W. Francisco	Unknown	December 3, 1895	December 7, 1897	Chair	Chair Pro Tem office was established in 1974		
25	W.L. Woodward	Unknown	December 7, 1897	December 5, 1899	Chair	Chair Pro Tem office was established in 1974		
26	Alonzo Edward Davis	Unknown	December 5, 1899	December 3, 1901	Chair	Chair Pro Tem office was established in 1974		
27	Edward S. Field	Unknown	December 3, 1901	December 1, 1903	Chair	Chair Pro Tem office was established in 1974		
28	Orray W. Longden	Unknown	December 1, 1903	December 5, 1905	Chair	Chair Pro Tem office was established in 1974		
29	Charles E. Patterson	Unknown	December 5, 1905	December 3, 1907	Chair	Chair Pro Tem office was established in 1974		
29	Charles E. Patterson	Unknown	December 3, 1907	December 7, 1909	Chair	Chair Pro Tem office was established in 1974		
30	Clarence J. Nellis	Unknown	December 7, 1909	December 5, 1911	Chair	Chair Pro Tem office was established in 1974		
31	Richard W. Pridham	Unknown	December 5, 1911	December 2, 1913	Chair	Chair Pro Tem office was established in 1974		
31	Richard W. Pridham	Unknown	December 2, 1913	December 7, 1915	Chair	Chair Pro Tem office was established in 1974		
31	Richard W. Pridham	Unknown	December 7, 1915	December 4, 1917	Chair	Chair Pro Tem office was established in 1974		
32	John J. Hamilton	Unknown	December 4, 1917	December 3, 1918	Chair	Chair Pro Tem office was established in 1974		
33	Jonathan S. Dodge	Unknown	December 3, 1918	December 7, 1920	Chair	Chair Pro Tem office was established in 1974		
34	Reuban F. McClellan	Unknown	December 7, 1920	December 5, 1922	Chair	Chair Pro Tem office was established in 1974		
35	Henry W. Wright	Republican	December 5, 1922	December 2, 1924	Chair	Chair Pro Tem office was established in 1974		
36	Reuban F. McClellan	Unknown	December 2, 1924	December 7, 1926	Chair	Chair Pro Tem office was established in 1974		
36	Reuban F. McClellan	Unknown	December 7, 1926	December 4, 1928	Chair	Chair Pro Tem office was established in 1974		
36	Reuban F. McClellan	Unknown	December 4, 1928	December 2, 1930	Chair	Chair Pro Tem office was established in 1974		
37	Henry W. Wright	Republican	December 2, 1930	December 6, 1932	Chair	Chair Pro Tem office was established in 1974		
38	Frank L. Shaw	Republican	December 6, 1932	June 26, 1933	Chair	Chair Pro Tem office was established in 1974		
39	Herbert C. Legg	Democratic	June 26, 1933	September 29, 1936	Chair	Chair Pro Tem office was established in 1974		
40	Roger W. Jessup	Republican	September 29, 1936	December 8, 1936	Chair	Chair Pro Tem office was established in 1974		
41	Leland M. Ford	Republican	December 8, 1936	December 6, 1938	Chair	Chair Pro Tem office was established in 1974		
42	Roger W. Jessup	Republican	December 6, 1938	December 3, 1940	Chair	Chair Pro Tem office was established in 1974		
42	Roger W. Jessup	Republican	December 3, 1940	December 2, 1941	Chair	Chair Pro Tem office was established in 1974		
43	Gordon L. McDonough	Republican	December 2, 1941	December 8, 1942	Chair	Chair Pro Tem office was established in 1974		
44	John Anson Ford	Democratic	December 8, 1942	December 7, 1943	Chair	Chair Pro Tem office was established in 1974		
45	Oscar L. Hauge	Republican	December 7, 1943	May 17, 1944	Chair	Chair Pro Tem office was established in 1974		
46	Roger W. Jessup	Republican	May 17, 1944	December 5, 1944	Chair	Chair Pro Tem office was established in 1974		
47	William A. Smith	Unknown	December 5, 1944	December 3, 1946	Chair	Chair Pro Tem office was established in 1974		
48	Raymond V. Darby	Republican	December 3, 1946	December 7, 1948	Chair	Chair Pro Tem office was established in 1974		
49	Leonard J. Roach	Republican	December 7, 1948	December 5, 1950	Chair	Chair Pro Tem office was established in 1974		
50	John Anson Ford	Democratic	December 5, 1950	December 2, 1952	Chair	Chair Pro Tem office was established in 1974		
50	John Anson Ford	Democratic	December 2, 1952	December 7, 1954	Chair	Chair Pro Tem office was established in 1974		
51	Herbert C. Legg	Democratic	December 7, 1954	March 27, 1956	Chair	Chair Pro Tem office was established in 1974		
52	Burton W. Chace	Republican	March 27, 1956	December 4, 1956	Chair	Chair Pro Tem office was established in 1974		
53	John Anson Ford	Democratic	December 4, 1956	December 2, 1958	Chair	Chair Pro Tem office was established in 1974		
54	Frank G. Bonelli	Democratic	December 2, 1958	December 6, 1960	Chair	Chair Pro Tem office was established in 1974		
55	Ernest E. Debs	Democratic	December 6, 1960	December 4, 1962	Chair	Chair Pro Tem office was established in 1974		
56	Warren M. Dorn	Republican	December 4, 1962	December 4, 1964	Chair	Chair Pro Tem office was established in 1974		
57	Burton W. Chace	Republican	December 4, 1964	December 6, 1966	Chair	Chair Pro Tem office was established in 1974		
58	Frank G. Bonelli	Democratic	December 6, 1966	December 3, 1968	Chair	Chair Pro Tem office was established in 1974		
59	Ernest E. Debs	Democratic	December 3, 1968	December 8, 1970	Chair	Chair Pro Tem office was established in 1974		
60	Warren M. Dorn	Republican	December 8, 1970	December 5, 1972	Chair	Chair Pro Tem office was established in 1974		
61	Peter F. Schabarum	Republican	December 5, 1972	December 3, 1974	Chair	Chair Pro Tem office was established in 1974		
Chair elected for a 1 year term with the Establishment of the Chair Pro Tem
62	James A. Hayes	Republican	December 3, 1974	December 2, 1975	Chair	Baxter Ward	Democratic	
63	Baxter Ward	Democratic	December 2, 1975	December 7, 1976	Chair	Edmund D. Edelman	Democratic	
63	Baxter Ward	Democratic	December 7, 1976	December 6, 1977	Chair	Edmund D. Edelman	Democratic	
64	Kenneth Hahn	Democratic	December 6, 1977	December 5, 1978	Chair	Edmund D. Edelman	Democratic	
65	Peter F. Schabarum	Republican	December 5, 1978	December 4, 1979	Chair	James A. Hayes	Republican	
66	Kenneth Hahn	Democratic	December 4, 1979	December 2, 1980	Chair	Baxter Ward	Democratic	
67	Edmund D. Edelman	Democratic	December 2, 1980	December 1, 1981	Chair	Peter F. Schabarum	Republican	
67	Edmund D. Edelman	Democratic	December 1, 1981	December 7, 1982	Chair	Peter F. Schabarum	Republican	
68	Peter F. Schabarum	Republican	December 7, 1982	December 6, 1983	Chair	Deane Dana	Republican	
69	Michael D. Antonovich	Republican	December 6, 1983	December 4, 1984	Mayor	Edmund D. Edelman	Democratic	
70	Edmund D. Edelman	Democratic	December 4, 1984	December 3, 1985	Chair	Peter F. Schabarum	Republican	
71	Peter F. Schabarum	Republican	December 3, 1985	December 2, 1986	Chair	Michael D. Antonovich	Republican	
72	Michael D. Antonovich	Republican	December 2, 1986	December 8, 1987	Mayor	Deane Dana	Republican	
73	Deane Dana	Republican	December 8, 1987	December 6, 1988	Chair	Edmund D. Edelman	Democratic	
74	Edmund D. Edelman	Democratic	December 6, 1988	December 21, 1989	Chair	Peter F. Schabarum	Republican	
75	Peter F. Schabarum	Republican	December 21, 1989	December 4, 1990	Chair	Michael D. Antonovich	Republican	
76	Michael D. Antonovich	Republican	December 4, 1990	December 3, 1991	Mayor	Deane Dana	Republican	
77	Deane Dana	Republican	December 3, 1991	December 8, 1992	Chair	Edmund D. Edelman	Democratic	
78	Edmund D. Edelman	Democratic	December 8, 1992	December 7, 1993	Chair	Yvonne Brathwaite Burke	Democratic	
79	Yvonne Brathwaite Burke	Democratic	December 7, 1993	December 6, 1994	Chair	Gloria Molina	Democratic	
80	Gloria Molina	Democratic	December 6, 1994	December 5, 1995	Chair	Michael D. Antonovich	Republican	
81	Michael D. Antonovich	Republican	December 5, 1995	December 3, 1996	Mayor	Zev Yaroslavsky	Democratic	
82	Zev Yaroslavsky	Democratic	December 3, 1996	December 3, 1997	Chair	Yvonne Brathwaite Burke	Democratic	
83	Yvonne Brathwaite Burke	Democratic	December 3, 1997	December 8, 1998	Chair	Don Knabe	Republican	
84	Don Knabe	Republican	December 8, 1998	December 7, 1999	Chair	Gloria Molina	Democratic	
85	Gloria Molina	Democratic	December 7, 1999	December 5, 2000	Chair	Michael D. Antonovich	Republican	
86	Michael D. Antonovich	Republican	December 5, 2000	December 4, 2001	Mayor	Zev Yaroslavsky	Democratic	
87	Zev Yaroslavsky	Democratic	December 4, 2001	December 3, 2002	Chair	Yvonne Brathwaite Burke	Democratic	
88	Yvonne Brathwaite Burke	Democratic	December 3, 2002	December 2, 2003	Chair	Don Knabe	Republican	
89	Don Knabe	Republican	December 2, 2003	December 7, 2004	Chair	Gloria Molina	Democratic	
90	Gloria Molina	Democratic	December 7, 2004	December 6, 2005	Chair	Michael D. Antonovich	Republican	
91	Michael D. Antonovich	Republican	December 6, 2005	December 5, 2006	Mayor	Zev Yaroslavsky	Democratic	
92	Zev Yaroslavsky	Democratic	December 5, 2006	December 4, 2007	Chair	Yvonne Brathwaite Burke	Democratic	
93	Yvonne Brathwaite Burke	Democratic	December 4, 2007	December 2, 2008	Chair	Don Knabe	Republican	
94	Don Knabe	Republican	December 2, 2008	December 8, 2009	Chair	Gloria Molina	Democratic	
95	Gloria Molina	Democratic	December 8, 2009	December 7, 2010	Chair	Michael D. Antonovich	Republican	
96	Michael D. Antonovich	Republican	December 7, 2010	December 6, 2011	Mayor	Zev Yaroslavsky	Democratic	
97	Zev Yaroslavsky	Democratic	December 6, 2011	December 4, 2012	Chair	Mark Ridley-Thomas	Democratic	
98	Mark Ridley-Thomas	Democratic	December 4, 2012	December 3, 2013	Chair	Don Knabe	Republican	
99	Don Knabe	Republican	December 3, 2013	December 2, 2014	Chair	Michael D. Antonovich	Republican	
Chair Elected by District Rotation
100	Michael D. Antonovich	Republican	December 2, 2014	December 8, 2015	Mayor	Hilda Solis	Democratic	
101	Hilda Solis	Democratic	December 8, 2015	December 6, 2016	Chair	Mark Ridley-Thomas	Democratic	
102	Mark Ridley-Thomas	Democratic	December 6, 2016	December 5, 2017	Chair	Sheila Kuehl	Democratic	
103	Sheila Kuehl	Democratic	December 5, 2017	December 4, 2018	Chair	Janice Hahn	Democratic	
104	Janice Hahn	Democratic	December 4, 2018	December 3, 2019	Chair	Kathryn Barger	Republican	
105	Kathryn Barger	Republican	December 3, 2019	December 8, 2020	Chair	Hilda Solis	Democratic	
106	Hilda Solis	Democratic	December 8, 2020	December 7, 2021	Chair	Holly Mitchell	Democratic	
107	Holly Mitchell	Democratic	December 7, 2021	December 6, 2022	Chair	Sheila Kuehl	Democratic	
108	Janice Hahn	Democratic	December 6, 2022	December 5, 2023	Chair	Lindsey Horvath	Democratic	
109	Lindsey Horvath	Democratic	December 5, 2023	December 3, 2024	Chair	Kathryn Barger	Republican	
110	Kathryn Barger	Republican	December 3, 2024	December 2, 2025	Chair	Hilda Solis	Democratic	
111	Hilda Solis	Democratic	December 2, 2025	Incumbent	Chair	Holly Mitchell	Democratic	

== Duties ==
"The Mayor/Chair shall possess the powers and perform the duties prescribed, as follows:

- a. Have general direction over the Board Room and assign seats for the use of the members;
- b. Preserve order and decorum; prevent demonstrations; order removed from the Board Room any person whose conduct deemed objectionable; and order the Board Room cleared whenever deemed necessary (Government Code Section 54957.9, see Appendix);
- c. Assure that attendants of the public at meetings in the Board Room shall be limited to that number which can be accommodated 8by the seating facilities regularly maintained therein. No standees shall be permitted;
- d. Allocate the length of time for public discussion of any matter in advance of such discussion, with the concurrence of the Board;
- e. Allocate equal time to opposing sides insofar as possible taking into account the number of persons requesting to be heard on any side;
- f. Limit the amount of time that a person may address the Board during a public discussion period in order to accommodate those persons desiring to speak and to facilitate the business of the Board;
- g. Authorize not more than one Set Matter per Board meeting. Any additional Set Matters shall require Board action; and
- h. Instruct a member of the public who wishes to address the Board on a matter under the supervision of the Department of Children and Family Services that such matter is not within the subject matter jurisdiction of the Board, that it is not within the power of the Board to alter the outcome of a court matter, and that case identifying information is confidential and may not be disclosed in public; bar public disclosure of such information; and direct the person to Section 38 which outlines the alternate procedure to be followed."

== Elected ==
"At noon on the first Monday in December, in the even-numbered years, the Chair Pro Tem shall automatically succeed to the position of Chair to serve until the election or succession of his/her successor; in the event there is no Chair Pro Tem, the Board shall elect a Mayor/Chair to serve for the said period. If the term of the Mayor/Chair expires in an odd-numbered year, the succession or election as provided herein of the new Mayor/Chair shall take place at 9:30 a.m. the first Tuesday following the first Monday in December. Upon the succession of the Chair Pro Tem to the position of Mayor/Chair."

== Notes ==
Chair John J. Morton Lost Re-election to the Board of Supervisors

Charles Prager was appointed to finish Chair Morton term

Chair W.F. Cooper Lost Re-election to the Board of Supervisors

Charles Prager was appointed to finish Chair Cooper term between 1882 - 1883 before being elected for a 2 year term between 1883 - 1885.

Chair John J. Hamilton Lost Re-election to the Board of Supervisors

Chair Frank L. Shaw resign as he was elected Mayor for Los Angeles City
