= Zev Yaroslavsky =

American politician (born 1948)

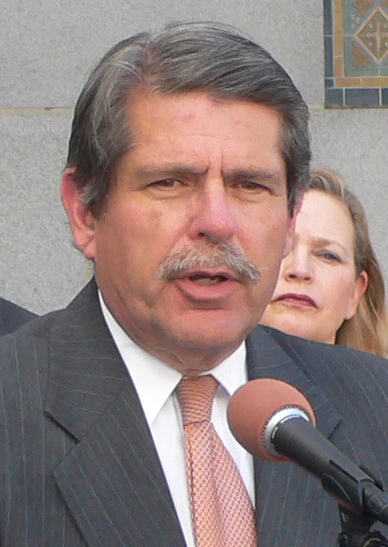
- Yaroslavsky in 2009

Member of the Los Angeles County Board of Supervisors from the 3rd district
- In office December 1, 1994 – December 1, 2014
- Preceded by: Edmund D. Edelman
- Succeeded by: Sheila Kuehl
Supervisory positions
Chair of Los Angeles County
In office December 6, 2011 – December 4, 2012
Preceded by	Michael D. Antonovich (Mayor)
Succeeded by	Mark Ridley-Thomas
In office December 5, 2006 – December 4, 2007
Preceded by	Michael D. Antonovich (Mayor)
Succeeded by	Yvonne Brathwaite Burke
In office December 4, 2001 – December 3, 2002
Preceded by	Michael D. Antonovich (Mayor)
Succeeded by	Yvonne Brathwaite Burke
In office December 3, 1996 – December 2, 1997
Preceded by	Michael D. Antonovich (Mayor)
Succeeded by	Yvonne Brathwaite Burke
Chair Pro Tem of Los Angeles County
In office December 7, 2010 – December 6, 2011
Preceded by	Michael D. Antonovich (Mayor Pro Tem)
Succeeded by	Mark Ridley-Thomas
In office December 6, 2005 – December 5, 2006
Preceded by	Michael D. Antonovich (Mayor Pro Tem)
Succeeded by	Yvonne Brathwaite Burke
In office December 5, 2000 – December 4, 2001
Preceded by	Michael D. Antonovich (Mayor Pro Tem)
Succeeded by	Yvonne Brathwaite Burke
In office December 5, 1995 – December 4, 1996
Preceded by	Michael D. Antonovich (Mayor Pro Tem)
Succeeded by	Yvonne Brathwaite Burke

Member of the Los Angeles City Council from the 5th district
- In office July 1, 1975 – December 1, 1994
- Preceded by: Edmund D. Edelman
- Succeeded by: Mike Feuer

Personal details
- Born: December 21, 1948 (age 77) Los Angeles, California
- Party: Democratic
- Spouse: Barbara Yaroslavsky
- Children: 2
- Relatives: Katy Yaroslavsky (daughter-in-law)
- Education: University of California, Los Angeles (BA, MA)
- Website: Archived

Zev Yaroslavsky (born December 21, 1948) is a politician from Los Angeles County, California. He was a member of the Los Angeles County Board of Supervisors from District 3, an affluent district which includes the San Fernando Valley, the Westside of Los Angeles and coastal areas between Venice and the Ventura County line. He was first elected to the board in 1994. Yaroslavsky served on the Los Angeles City Council from 1975 to 1994.

During his tenure in Los Angeles politics, Yaroslavsky played an influential role in limiting housing construction and development in the city, leading a "slow-growth movement." Yaroslavsky argued in 1987 that Los Angeles had "filled up." He authored Proposition U, a successful 1986 ballot initiative, that the Los Angeles Times called "the largest one-shot effort to limit development in the city's history."

In the 1990s, he blocked expansion of light rail into Santa Monica and authored Proposition A, a successful 1998 ballot initiative which prevented new expansions of the Los Angeles Metro Rail.

== Early life and education ==
Zev Yaroslavsky, the son of David and Minna Yaroslavsky, was born on December 21, 1948, in Los Angeles. He and his older sister, Shimona (married name: Kushner), were the children of Jewish immigrants from the Russian Empire and grew up in a Zionist household in Boyle Heights. His father was a founder of the Hebrew Teachers Union in Los Angeles, and both parents, who were born in Ukraine, were founders of North American Habonim, a Labor Zionist youth movement. Yaroslavsky recalled that his parents spoke to their children only in Hebrew to prepare them for emigrating to Israel. Yaroslavsky's visited Israel when Shimona was thirteen and Zev was five. Shimona later emigrated permanently.

Yaroslavsky attended Melrose Avenue Elementary School, Bancroft Junior High School and Fairfax High School. He earned a Bachelor of Arts in history and economics from UCLA in 1971 and a Master of Arts in history, specializing in the British Empire, from the same school in 1972. Afterward, he taught Hebrew at temples in Pasadena and Bel Air.

== Political activism ==
Yaroslavsky first gained public notice as a UCLA student who had begun orchestrating high-profile protests in Los Angeles against oppressive treatment of Jews in the Soviet Union. After a revelatory trip to visit relatives in Russia, he formed the California Students for Soviet Jews, which, as its first major action, picketed Soviet athletes in town for a track and field event at the Coliseum. Although a self-described "flaming liberal" at the time, Yaroslavsky recruited conservative TV newsman and commentator George Putnam, who, Yaroslavsky said, "was anti-Soviet and very favorable to Soviet Jews." In December, 1969, they organized a candlelight protest march that would attract more than 5,000 people, including then-Mayor Sam Yorty and television performer Steve Allen.

In 1971, as executive director of the Southern California Council on Soviet Jewry, Yaroslavsky made news again when he led protests against the Bolshoi Ballet and boated into Los Angeles Harbor to paint "Let My People Go" on the side of a Soviet freighter. He was arrested during one Bolshoi protest but no charges were filed. He also was "deeply involved" in a campaign to burn Standard Oil credit cards after the company sent a letter to 300,000 stockholders that appeared to support a pro-Arab Middle East policy. He resigned from that $150-a-week job to campaign for the City Council.

== City Council ==
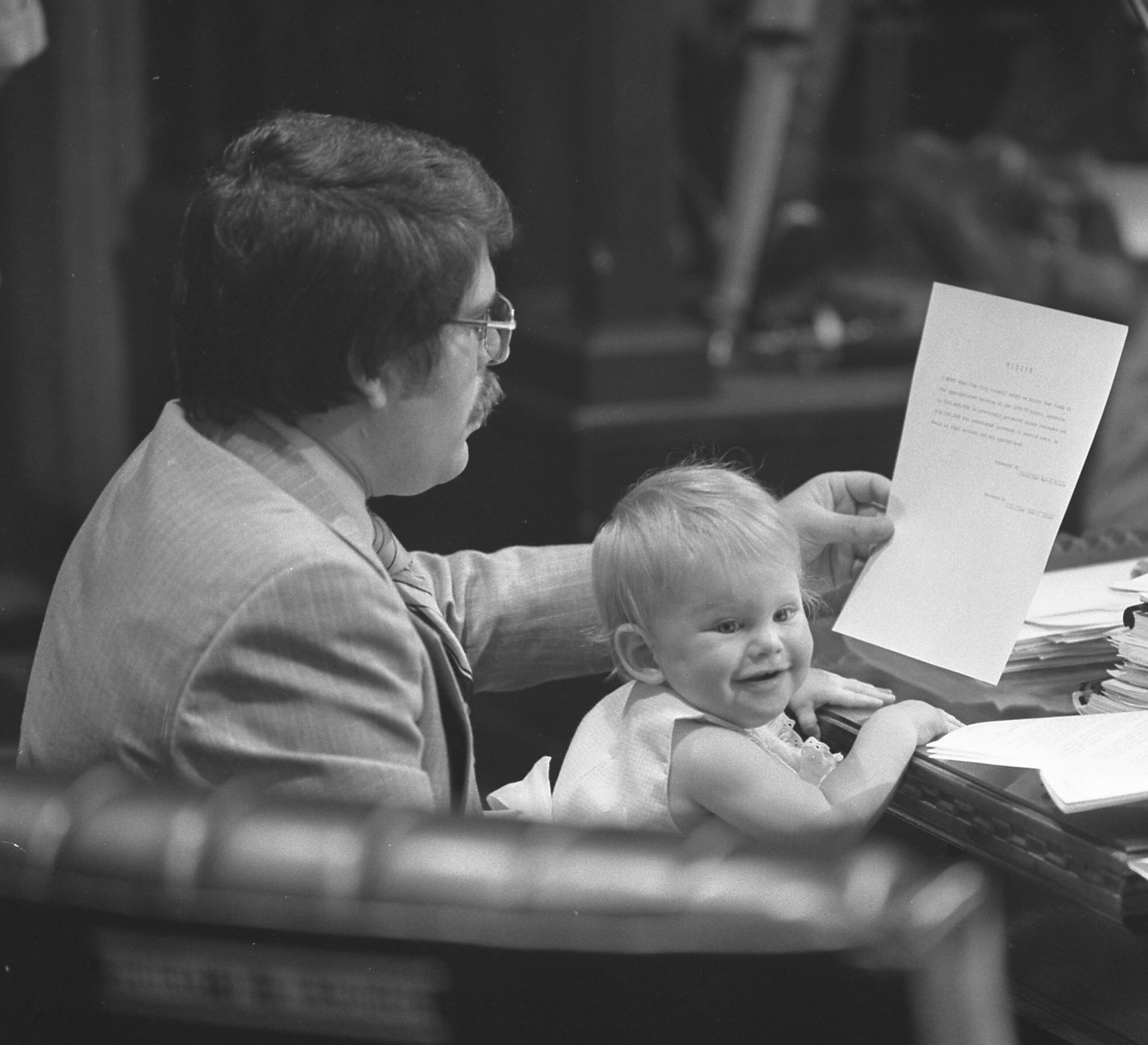
Yaroslavsky holding his daughter Mina during a city council meeting, 1978.

=== Elections ===
Yaroslavsky's 1975 election to the City Council's 5th District on Los Angeles' Westside stunned the city's political establishment, which had supported his opponent, Frances M. Savitch, a former aide to then-Mayor Tom Bradley. Savitch had secured endorsements from, among others, California's two U.S. senators, members of Congress and an assortment of state office holders—"some of the strongest political muscle ever assembled in a City Council race," as the Los Angeles Times put it in a post-election analysis. In the primary, Yaroslavsky ran second to Savitch, eliminating from the race Rosalind Wiener Wyman, who was seeking to retake the seat she held from 1953 to 1965. Wyman endorsed Yaroslavsky in his grass-roots general election campaign. When Yaroslavsky was sworn in as the council's then-youngest member at age 26, Mayor Bradley quipped: "Congratulations. Now you're part of the establishment." "Yes," Yaroslavsky recalled retorting, "but the establishment is not part of me."

During his tenure, Yaroslavsky served as chairman of two of the council's most powerful committees—one that oversaw the city's budget and finances, the other that oversaw the Los Angeles Police Department. He had a reputation among his colleagues as driven, ambitious and bright, someone who "knows the value of…good box office issues." Yaroslavsky vacated his seat early after his successful election to the Los Angeles County Board of Supervisors. In a 1994 story marking his first day as a supervisor, the Los Angeles Times noted that "Yaroslavsky was more often than not a dominant player in virtually every municipal initiative of note since he joined the City Council in 1975."

=== Tenure ===
Yaroslavsky was on the city council from 1975 to 1994. When he opted not to run for re-election in 1994 and instead ran for the Los Angeles County Board of Supervisors, Yaroslavsky's wife Barbara unsuccessfully ran to replace him on the city council.

==== Opposition to housing and development ====
Yaroslavsky successfully obtained ordinances that reduced neighborhood building heights and imposed severe restrictions on hillside development. Yaroslavsky also led an effort to substantially limit the scale of development in Century City. Yaroslavsky was credited with orchestrating the negotiations concerning the use, for the first time, of potential traffic congestion measurements to help determine the scope of a project.

In 1984, Yaroslavsky suffered a stinging setback when the Los Angeles City Council voted 8–7 to reject his proposed moratorium on high-rises along Wilshire Boulevard, a proposal that had turned the heavily traveled thoroughfare into a "political battleground." He said the defeat—which he blamed on council colleagues who reneged on promises to vote for the measure—left him angry and committed to taking his "slow-growth" message to voters. In 1986, Yaroslavsky and Los Angeles City Councilmember Marvin Braude authored a ballot initiative, Proposition U, that the Los Angeles Times called "the largest one-shot effort to limit development in the city's history." The measure proposed to cut in half the size of new buildings allowed on more than 70% of the city's commercial and industrial property. Critics, including labor and business leaders, predicted that Prop. U would discourage investment in L.A. and reduce jobs, particularly in economically depressed minority neighborhoods. But the measure passed by a margin of more than 2-to-1 and was hailed by supporters as representing the "dawn of a new era" in managing Los Angeles' growth.

Yaroslavsky argued in 1987 that "This city, which for 100 years grew out, has filled up... We always had more room. But now there is no more margin." In defending Proposition U, Yaroslavsky argued that down-zoning Los Angeles had no adverse economic effects, "There is no down-zoning in this city that ever negatively affected the economics of the city. … We cut density by one-third on Melrose Avenue. The only thing that happened is rents continued to skyrocket." Critics say that skyrocketing rents were an adverse effect of Proposition U.

The following year, Yaroslavsky and Braude teamed up again, this time to gather signatures for a ballot initiative that would block Occidental Petroleum Corp.'s decades-long effort to drill for oil in the Pacific Palisades along the city's shoreline. The controversial Proposition O would ban future drilling 1,000 yards inland of the mean high tide line. While environmentalists lined up behind the measure, opponents derided it as "an elitist cause" that would deprive the city of between $100 million and $200 million in taxes, royalties and license fees. Mayor Tom Bradley said the measure was unnecessary given safety precautions Occidental had proposed to prevent an accident. In November 1988, voters narrowly approved Proposition O, bringing to a close what was then the most expensive electoral campaign in the city's history.

These back-to-back victories heightened Yaroslavsky's profile and positioned him as the top challenger to Bradley, whose popularity had begun to erode. In early 1988, as the councilmember was preparing a potential mayoral bid, his "slow-growth" credentials came under harsh scrutiny in a lengthy Los Angeles Times story headlined, "The Two Sides of Zev Yaroslavsky." While the piece praised Yaroslavsky's growth-control record in Century City and elsewhere, it accused him of quietly taking actions on behalf of some projects that he had publicly criticized, including the Westside Pavilion mall and two buildings that would have been blocked under his ill-fated Wilshire Boulevard construction moratorium. The story also noted that Yaroslavsky received strong financial support from major developers. In January, 1989, Yaroslavsky announced that he would not challenge Bradley, calling the four-term mayor a "very popular and entrenched incumbent" who would be "virtually impossible" to beat.

In 1993, Yaroslavsky sought to block or limit expansion plans for 20th Century Fox in his Westside district. Homeowner groups in his district opposed the expansion.

==== Role in limiting rail expansion ====
Yaroslavsky played an important role in blocking the expansion of the Expo Line to Santa Monica in his Westside district in 1993. Homeowners in the district had complained that the proposed route would cause crime and noise.

==== Los Angeles Police Department ====
During the late 1970s and early 1980s, Yaroslavsky emerged as the leading critic of the Los Angeles Police Department's controversial intelligence-gathering practices. In an open challenge to then-Chief Daryl F. Gates, Yaroslavsky accused the department's Public Disorder Intelligence Division of spying on some 200 law-abiding individuals and groups. The unit was disbanded in early 1983 amid mounting disclosures that the department had not only been spying on critics and left-leaning groups, but also had been secretly storing intelligence files in the home and garage of a detective. Those documents included files on Yaroslavsky and then-Mayor Tom Bradley. A confidential report by three top Los Angeles police officials concluded, among other things, that the unit was riddled with management problems and was plagued by attitudes rooted in the past. The ensuing outcry set the stage for Yaroslavsky to prevail in his five-year effort to win passage of a local freedom of information act, which was strongly opposed by police officials who argued that it would be "stupid" to tell a potential "terrorist" whether the department had a file on him. One assistant chief accused the councilmember of a "lack of integrity." Although the council majority weakened the final ordinance under pressure from the department, Yaroslavsky and the American Civil Liberties Union, which had sued the LAPD, proclaimed victory nonetheless. "It's not as strong as I wanted it to be," Yaroslavsky said, "but it could have been a lot weaker." The ACLU suit was settled in 1984, with the City of Los Angeles agreeing to pay $1.8 million to 131 plaintiffs and to establish more rigorous controls over future intelligence-gathering activities.

As chairman of the council's powerful Police, Fire and Public Safety Committee, Yaroslavsky criticized the LAPD's use of choke holds, which had been linked to more than a dozen deaths of suspects in Los Angeles police custody during a three-year period in the early 1980s. Yaroslavsky and his committee initially negotiated new guidelines for use of the technique, aimed at subduing suspects by either choking off air supply or blocking the flow of blood to the brain, causing unconsciousness. But by the end of 1982, with controversy continuing, Yaroslavsky argued that a moratorium on chokeholds imposed by the civilian Police Commission should be made permanent.

==== Conflicts of interest ====
In 1990, Yaroslavsky authorized a nonprofit group, Jewish Federation Council, which was run by the husband of Yaroslavsky's long-time top aide to build housing on a lot without taking part in competitive bidding procedures.

==== Other ====
RFK assassination (1975): Yaroslavsky submitted a successful resolution to the council creating an ad hoc investigative group that was to review the police and other official investigations into the assassination of Senator Robert F. Kennedy in 1968.

Bakery prices (1977): He offered a resolution that would have required bakeries to post the prices of their goods.

Olympics (1978): Yaroslavsky and Councilmember Bob Ronka were known as the "most active . . . skeptics" in working to protect the city from potentially incurring "massive security costs" that the two believed should be shouldered by the private Los Angeles Olympic Organizing Committee in staging the 1984 Olympic Games.

Skokie: As a councilmember, Yaroslavsky announced that he would go to Skokie, Illinois, in June 1978 to attend a rally protesting a planned march by American Nazis through the heavily Jewish Chicago suburb. He called the march "an insidious provocation which should shock the conscience of every American."

Council feud (1981): Yaroslavsky successfully worked to unseat long-time council President John Ferraro. Both men were potential mayoral candidates. Ferraro purportedly struck back by engineering the election of Councilmember Joel Wachs to the council presidency over Yaroslavsky's favored candidate, Councilwoman Pat Russell.[5] "Mr. Ferraro's actions show the small measure of the man," Yaroslavsky said. Ferraro said of Yaroslavsky: "I think he's childish, desperate…immature." The conflict over the demolition was emblematic of a deeper political rift between the two men that was roiling the entire council. As one said, "somebody has got to bring these guys together again."

Breaking with tradition (1985): Yaroslavsky broke with City Council tradition when he campaigned for challenger Michael Woo against pro-growth fellow council member Peggy Stevenson, who had helped defeat a controversial building moratorium planned for part of Yaroslavsky's district. Councilmember Dave Cunningham called that an act of "back stabbing." But Yaroslavsky dismissed Cunningham and other critics as "the same ones who have been sticking it to the Westside for 25 years."

== Board of Supervisors ==
Yaroslavsky represented the Third Supervisorial District of Los Angeles County, which encompasses the cities of Malibu, Santa Monica, West Hollywood, Calabasas, as well as most of the western San Fernando Valley and other portions of the City of Los Angeles.

=== Elections ===
Yaroslavsky won his first term on the Los Angeles County Board of Superviors when Edmund D. Edelman did not seek re-election in 1994. In his 2006 re-election race he ran against David Hernandez, a Republican and retired insurance adjuster who unsuccessfully campaigned to keep a cross on the Los Angeles County Seal, and Randy Springer. Yaroslavsky won the election, receiving 70.49% of the vote in the primary. Yaroslavsky was elected to a fifth term in 2010, running unopposed. As a result of term limits, Yaroslavsky left the Board of Supervisors in December 2014 and did not run for mayor as was predicted.

=== Tenure ===
==== Opposition to housing and development ====
Yaroslavsky sought to restrict development and preserve open space in the Santa Monica Mountains. Since he joined the Board of Supervisors in 1994, he helped acquire 7,870 acres of county parkland through bonds and matching funds. In 2004, Yaroslavsky helped craft a controversial ordinance that made it more difficult to develop scenic ridge lines in the Santa Monica Mountains, while also cutting in half the amount of grading allowed without a conditional use permit. This reversed the extensive development policies of county leaders in the 1980s and early 1990s. Opponents denounced the ordinance as an arbitrary and unrealistic "land grab."

In 1997, Yaroslavsky pushed for a 40% reduction in Universal Studios’ proposed $2-billion expansion on its Universal City lot. In 2007, Yaroslavsky sought to block a proposal to lift height limitations on housing construction. In 2008, he wrote an editorial in the Los Angeles Times titled, "Don't be dense," in which he argued that dense housing had adverse effects. In 2012, Yaroslavsky successfully blocked NBCUniversal from building 3,000 apartments on part of its back lot in Universal City. He argued that the housing would have "considerable downside to Universal and to our local economy."

Yaroslavsky created a county pilot program in 2008 called Project 50, aimed at providing permanent supportive housing to the 50 people most likely to die on the streets of L.A.'s Skid Row. It was funded with a county grant of $3 million. Project 50 was criticized for not requiring participants to achieve sobriety before they're permanently housed with public funds. In 2009, the board majority resisted the program's broader, countywide implementation. "Warehousing without healing," is how one described Project 50 in a Los Angeles Times series that raised questions about the program's effectiveness. But Los Angeles Times columnist Steve Lopez, whose relationship with a homeless violinist became the basis of the movie The Soloist, studied the program and concluded that "for the most part the results have been remarkable."

==== Transportation ====
As a county supervisor, Yaroslavsky sat on the board of directors of the Metropolitan Transportation Authority. He led a campaign to ban the use of the transit sales tax to fund further expansions of the Los Angeles subway. He sponsored controversial ballot initiative, Proposition A, to that end. Yaroslavsky argued that mass transit could be achieved less expensively and more efficiently through light-rail and dedicated busways than through subways. Critics portrayed Proposition A as too extreme and argued that it would prevent subways from coming to the county's minority neighborhoods. Critics also pointed to Yaroslavsky's role earlier in the decade blocking the E Line (Expo line) expansion to Santa Monica, which ultimately was completed in 2016. The ballot initiative passed with 68.1 percent support in November 1998. As a result of the ballot initiative, there was no subsequent expansion of the Los Angeles metro to the Eastside. According to Ethan Elkind, "Many observers considered the measure to be a referendum on the MTA," which was a deeply unpopular agency.

Yaroslavsky pushed for a 14-mile dedicated busway that would cut through the San Fernando Valley on paved right-of-ways. It was nicknamed the "Napkin Line" because Yaroslavsky drew the route on a Varig napkin while flying home from studying a similar system in Curitiba, Brazil. Officially called the "Orange Line," the $350-million busway began service in 2005 and soon achieved ridership numbers that far exceeded planners' predictions and led to better freeway commute times. "This is one of Metro's greatest success stories," the agency's deputy CEO said.

In Ethan Elkind's history of the Los Angeles rail system, he writes that Yaroslavsky shifted his attitudes on light rail and subway rail after becoming a county supervisor and being less beholden to homeowner interests in Cheviot Hills and Rancho Park. Money was restored to subway construction and other major transit projects in 2008, when county voters approved a half-cent sales tax measure promoted by Yaroslavsky and Los Angeles Mayor Antonio Villaraigosa. Measure R is expected to generate $40 billion over 30 years. The measure detailed specific rail and highway projects that will be undertaken, including the Purple Line subway on the Westside and the Expo Line, a light rail project backed by Yaroslavsky that begins in Downtown Los Angeles and will end in Santa Monica when completed in 2017. The supervisor was also an early proponent of easing Westside traffic by converting Pico and Olympic Boulevards into complementary one-way thoroughfares.

==== Health care ====
In 2002, Yaroslavsky authored a ballot initiative to raise $168 million annually in an effort to avert the potential collapse of Los Angeles County's vast emergency and trauma-care network, which was threatened by a deep health-care budget deficit. Measure B passed with 73 percent of the vote, marking the first time since the 1978 passage of tax-slashing Proposition 13 that county voters had approved a direct tax on their property. As a result, the county was able to avoid the possible closure of two public hospitals while keeping emergency and trauma-care services afloat. Yaroslavsky proposed setting up a health care clinic on the campus of the local Sun Valley Middle School in the northeastern San Fernando Valley. The county appropriated $7.5 million for construction costs.

Yaroslavsky, a former smoker, played a key role in the county's anti-tobacco efforts. In 1996, he successfully pressed the county to sue six tobacco companies to recover hundreds of millions of dollars in health-care costs from smoking-related illnesses. Four years later, as part of a statewide settlement of tobacco litigation, the county received a $79 million payment, the first to be made annually for 25 years. In all, Los Angeles County was expected to receive nearly $3 billion as result of the litigation.

After a 2001 diagnosis with Type 2 diabetes, Yaroslavsky sponsored an ordinance requiring fast-food outlets in unincorporated Los Angeles County areas to post calorie counts on their menus.

Yaroslavsky and his four colleagues on the Board of Supervisors came under sharp criticism in a Pulitzer Prize-winning 2004 series by the Los Angeles Times on massive and deadly problems inside Martin Luther King Jr./Drew Medical Center in South Los Angeles, a county hospital built after the 1965 Watts Riots to serve the area's then-largely African-American population. Current and previous supervisors were accused of failing to take action for decades because of internal board politics and fear of an angry backlash from some African-American community leaders who strongly supported the hospital, despite its documented problems. After the series was published, in-patient services were shut down. Yaroslavsky proposed re-opening the medical center under a partnership with the University of California.

==== Arts ====
Yaroslavsky has been instrumental in securing millions of dollars in funding for the arts in Los Angeles County. In 1996, he introduced a bond measure designed to improve parks, buy open space and provide new recreational facilities. It passed with 65% of the vote. Among other things, Proposition A set aside millions of dollars to remake the iconic shell at the Hollywood Bowl. He appropriated an additional nearly $7 million from the Third District capital and maintenance fund to replace the deteriorating 1929 shell. The new shell—praised by members of the Los Angeles Philharmonic for its acoustics and larger size—was unveiled in June, 2004.

Yaroslavsky played a key role among local elected officials in the construction of the Walt Disney Concert Hall in downtown Los Angeles. He appropriated $1 million to help build architect Frank Gehry's distinctive hall, which opened in 2003. In 2007, he appropriated $2 million from the Third District's capital projects budget for the construction of a concert venue in the San Fernando Valley. Located on the campus of California State University, Northridge, the Valley Performing Arts Center opened in January, 2011.

Explaining his arts advocacy, Yaroslavsky told the Los Angeles Times: "Even if you don't like ballet or classical music or opera, it's an economic engine, it puts people to work, and it pays well."

== Later career ==
In 2018, Yaroslavsky expressed opposition to SB 827, which allowed dense housing construction near major public transit stations. He argued the bill "will destroy neighborhoods, destroy the sense of place that many of our neighborhoods and our villages represent."

In 2019, Yaroslavsky expressed opposition to SB 50, which permitted the construction of duplexes, triplexes and fourplexes on much of the residential land that had previously been zoned exclusively for single-family homes. He argued, "When people around the world think of L.A., one of the things they think of is a home with a backyard. I think much of it should be preserved."

In 2024, Yaroslavsky said, "we don't have a housing shortage" in the L.A. region.

== Personal life ==
Yaroslavsky was married to the former Barbara Edelston (1947–2018), whom he met as a student at UCLA. In 1985, while Yaroslavsky was a City Council member, a newspaper reporter noted Yaroslavsky's frugality when describing their home in the Fairfax District as "a drab yellow structure with peeling paint and a dirt-patched front lawn." The reporter noted that Yaroslavsky was known for frugality in his public and private life, spending much of his spare time following world events in newspapers and on television. Barbara Yaroslavsky was first appointed to the Medical Board of California in 2003, and subsequently served multiple terms as its president. The couple had two children, a son named David and daughter Mina. Their son David is a Los Angeles Superior Court judge. David's wife and Zev's daughter in law, Katy Yaroslavsky, was elected to the Los Angeles City Council in 2022.

In 2001, Yaroslavsky was diagnosed with Type 2 diabetes. Although a longtime daily runner, he immediately changed his diet and lifestyle, reducing his weight from 215 pounds (97.5 kg) to 185 (83 kg) in 2008.

He has been a supporter of the Los Angeles Opera, conducting the national anthem at the 2014 performance of La Traviata at the Dorothy Chandler Pavilion, directed by Marta Domingo.

== See also ==
- History of the Jews in Los Angeles

== Documentary ==
- Yaroslavsky was interviewed in the 2007 documentary, Refusenik.

Political offices
Preceded by Edmund D. Edelman	Los Angeles City Council; 5th District; 1975–94	Succeeded by Michael Feuer
Preceded by Edmund D. Edelman	Los Angeles County Board of Supervisors; 3rd District; 1994–2014	Succeeded by Sheila Kuehl
Preceded by Michael D. Antonovich (Mayor)	Chair of Los Angeles County; 2011-2012; 2006-2007; 2001-2002; 1996-1997	Succeeded by Mark Ridley-Thomas
Preceded by Michael D. Antonovich (Mayor)	Chair of Los Angeles County; 2011-2012; 2006-2007; 2001-2002; 1996-1997	Succeeded by Yvonne Brathwaite Burke
Preceded by Michael D. Antonovich (Mayor Pro Tem)	Chair Pro Tem of Los Angeles County; 2010-2011; 2005-2006; 2000-2001; 1995-1996	Succeeded by Mark Ridley-Thomas
Preceded by Michael D. Antonovich (Mayor Pro Tem)	Chair Pro Tem of Los Angeles County; 2010-2011; 2005-2006; 2000-2001; 1995-1996	Succeeded by Yvonne Brathwaite Burke
