= James A. Hayes =

American politician

Chair of Los Angeles County
- In office December 3, 1974– December 2, 1975
- Preceded by: Peter F. Schabarum
- Succeeded by: Baxter Ward

Chair Pro Tem of Los Angeles County
- In office December 5, 1978 - December 4, 1979
- Preceded by: Edmund D. Edelman
- Succeeded by: Baxter Ward

Member of the Los Angeles County Board of Supervisors from the 4th district
- In office August 31, 1972 – June 1, 1979
- Preceded by: Burton W. Chace
- Succeeded by: Yvonne Brathwaite Burke

Member of the California State Assembly from the 39th district
- In office January 6, 1967 – August 31, 1972
- Preceded by: George Deukmejian
- Succeeded by: Bill Bond

Personal details
- Born: December 5, 1921 Fowler, California
- Died: August 10, 2000 (aged 78) Lomita, California
- Party: Republican
- Spouse(s): Janne Mentzel; Sonja Pederson Hayes
- Children: 4

Military service
- Branch/service: United States Army
- Battles/wars: World War II

James A. Hayes (December 5, 1921 – August 10, 2000) was an American politician who served on the Los Angeles County Board of Supervisors, representing the 4th district, and in the California State Legislature.

== Biography ==
James A. Hayes was born in Fowler, California, on December 5, 1921. During World War II, he served in the United States Navy. In 1966, he was elected to the California State Assembly and was re-elected twice. During his tenure, Hayes chaired the Assembly's Judiciary Committee and co-authored its Family Law Act, which implemented no-fault divorce. The law also instructed judges to set alimony by assessing the supported spouse's ability to engage in gainful employment without interfering with the interests of their shared children. After its passage, Hayes cited a committee report that he had secretly written to convince state judges that the law's legislative intent should allow him to reduce his own alimony payments.

Hayes also served on the Long Beach city council and as vice-mayor. After Los Angeles County Supervisor Burton W. Chace died in an automobile accident in 1972, then-Governor Ronald Reagan appointed Hayes to replace him. Hayes was elected outright to the office on November 7, 1972, and re-elected in 1976. On June 1, 1979, Hayes suddenly resigned from office. Governor Jerry Brown appointed Yvonne Brathwaite Burke to replace him, but she was defeated for re-election in 1980, returning to the board in 1992.

Hayes died on August 10, 2000, at the age of 78.

Political offices
| Preceded by Peter F. Schabarum | Chair of Los Angeles County; 1974–1975 | Succeeded by Baxter Ward |
| Preceded by Edmund D. Edelman | Chair Pro Tem of Los Angeles County; 1978–1979 | Succeeded by Peter F. Schabarum |
| Preceded by Burton W. Chace | Los Angeles County Board of Supervisors; 4th district 1972–1979 | Succeeded by Yvonne Brathwaite Burke |
