= Yvonne Brathwaite Burke =

American politician (born 1932)

Yvonne Burke
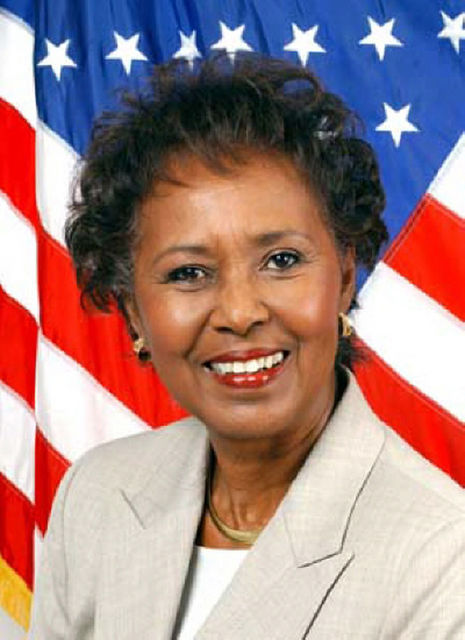

Member of the Los Angeles County Board of Supervisors
- In office December 8, 1992 – December 1, 2008
- Preceded by: Kenneth Hahn
- Succeeded by: Mark Ridley-Thomas
- Constituency: 2nd district
- In office January 3, 1979 – December 2, 1980
- Preceded by: James A. Hayes
- Succeeded by: Deane Dana
- Constituency: 4th district
Supervisoral positions
Chair of Los Angeles County
In office December 4, 2007 – December 2, 2008
Preceded by	Zev Yaroslavsky
Succeeded by	Don Knabe
In office December 3, 2002 – December 2, 2003
Preceded by	Zev Yaroslavsky
Succeeded by	Don Knabe
In office December 3, 1997 – December 2, 1998
Preceded by	Zev Yaroslavsky
Succeeded by	Don Knabe
In office December 7, 1993 – December 6, 1994
Preceded by	Edmund D. Edelman
Succeeded by	Gloria Molina

Member of the U.S. House of Representatives from California
- In office January 3, 1973 – January 3, 1979
- Preceded by: Constituency established
- Succeeded by: Julian Dixon
- Constituency: 37th district (1973–1975); 28th district (1975–1979)

Member of the California State Assembly from the 63rd district
- In office January 2, 1967 – January 3, 1973
- Preceded by: Don Allen
- Succeeded by: Julian Dixon

Personal details
- Born: Perle Yvonne Watson; October 5, 1932 (age 94) Los Angeles, California, U.S.
- Party: Democratic
- Spouses: Louis Brathwaite (m. 1957; div. 1964); William Burke (m. 1972; died 2026)
- Children: Autumn and 1 stepdaughter
- Education: University of California, Berkeley (attended); University of California, Los Angeles (BA); University of Southern California (JD)

Yvonne Pearl Burke (née Watson, later Brathwaite; born October 5, 1932) is an American politician and lawyer from California. She was the first African-American woman to represent the West Coast in Congress. She served in the U.S. Congress from 1973 to 1979. She represented the 2nd District on the Los Angeles County Board of Supervisors from 1992 to 2008. She served as chair of Los Angeles County four times and served as chair pro tem three times.

In 1973, she became the first member of the U.S. Congress to give birth while in office, and she was the first person to be granted maternity leave by the Speaker of the U.S. House of Representatives.

In 1976, Burke became the first woman to chair the Congressional Black Caucus.

She served on the board of directors of Amtrak, having been appointed to the position by President Barack Obama in 2012 and retired in 2024.

== Early life and career ==
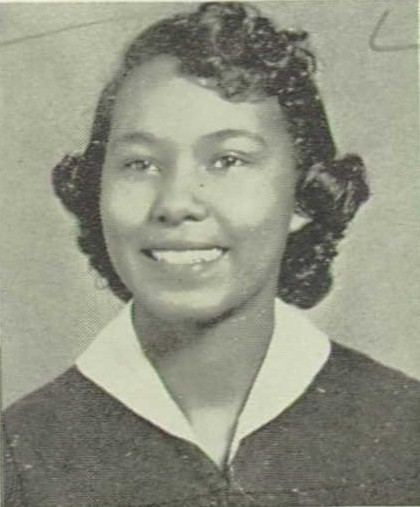
Yvonne Brathwaite Burke in 1950

Perle Yvonne Watson was born on October 5, 1932, in Los Angeles as the only child of James A. Watson and the former Lola Moore.

After first attending a public school, she was sent to a model school for exceptional children. At Manual Arts High School she was a member of the debate team. She served as vice president of the Latin Club her junior year and girls' vice president in her senior year.

Burke attended the University of California, Berkeley from c. 1949 to 1951 before receiving a bachelor's degree in political science from the University of California, Los Angeles in 1953. She subsequently earned a J.D. degree from the University of Southern California Law School in 1956. Burke is one of the first black women to be admitted to the University of Southern California Law School.

Her first entry into the world of politics was when she worked as a volunteer for the reelection of President Lyndon B. Johnson in 1964. She was elected to the California State Assembly in 1966, representing Los Angeles' 63rd District (1967–1972). Many of her early legislative efforts centered around juvenile issues and limiting garnishment of wages.

She served as vice-chairperson of the 1972 Democratic National Convention. She was the first African American and the first woman of color to hold that position, and presided for about fourteen hours when the chair left the convention on its last day.

That same year, she was elected to the first of three terms in the U.S. House of Representatives.

== Tenure in U.S. Congress ==
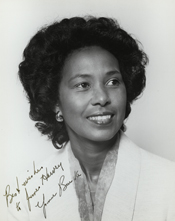
Burke, c. 1975

During her tenure in Congress, she served on the House Select Committee on Assassinations, House Beauty Shop Committee, and the House Committee on Appropriations; during her tenure on the Appropriations Committee, she fought for increased funding to aid local jurisdictions to comply with desegregation mandates

In 1973, with the birth of her daughter Autumn, Burke became the first member of Congress to give birth while in office and the first to be granted maternity leave by the speaker of the United States House of Representatives.

In 1976, Burke became the first woman to chair the Congressional Black Caucus.

She did not seek re-election to Congress in 1978, but instead ran for attorney general of California. She lost to Republican George Deukmejian.

== Later political career ==
In 1979, shortly after she left Congress, Governor Jerry Brown appointed Burke to the Board of Regents of the University of California; but she resigned later that year when Governor Brown appointed her to fill a vacancy in the District 4 seat on the Los Angeles County Board of Supervisors. Burke was the first female and first African-American supervisor. Her district, however, was largely made up of affluent, conservative white areas on the coast. In 1980, Burke was defeated in her bid for a full term in the seat by Republican Deane Dana. In 1982, Brown again appointed her to the Regents.

In 1992, Burke ran for the District 2 seat on the L.A. County Board of Supervisors. The primary election was held in June, 1992, just weeks after the 1992 Los Angeles Riots. After a hard-fought campaign that often turned negative, Burke narrowly defeated State Senator Diane Watson.

In 2007, Burke announced that she would retire when her term expired in 2008. On July 27, 2007, the Los Angeles Times published a front-page story revealing that she was not living in the mostly low-income district she represented, but rather in the wealthy Brentwood neighborhood, an apparent violation of state law. Burke responded that she was living at her Brentwood mansion because the townhouse she listed in official political filings was being remodeled.

On March 29, 2012, she was nominated by President Barack Obama to serve on the Amtrak Board of Directors. Confirmed by the U.S. Senate, she held a seat on that board until 2024.

== Personal life ==
In 1957 she married Louis Brathwaite, divorcing in 1964. She married William A. Burke in Los Angeles on June 14, 1972, just days after she won a Congressional primary against Billy Mills, a Los Angeles City Council member for whom William Burke had worked. William Burke is also the creator of the Los Angeles Marathon. Their daughter Autumn Burke was born on November 23, 1973. Yvonne and Autumn are the first mother-and-daughter to both serve in the California Assembly. William Burke died on May 29, 2026

== Memberships ==
Burke is a member of Alpha Kappa Alpha sorority.

Burke is a Fellow of the National Academy of Public Administration.

== Electoral history ==
1972 United States House of Representatives elections in California
Party	Candidate	Votes	%
Democratic	Yvonne Brathwaite Burke	120,392	73.2
Republican	Greg Tria	40,633	24.7
Peace and Freedom	John Hagg	3,485	2.1
Total votes		164,510	100.0
Democratic hold			

1974 United States House of Representatives elections in California
Party	Candidate	Votes	%
Democratic	Yvonne Brathwaite Burke (incumbent)	86,743	80.1
Republican	Tom Neddy	21,308	19.9
Total votes		108,051	100.0
Democratic hold			

1976 United States House of Representatives elections in California
Party	Candidate	Votes	%
Democratic	Yvonne Brathwaite Burke (incumbent)	114,612	80.2
Republican	Edward S. Skinner	28,303	19.8
Total votes		142,915	100.0
Democratic hold			

== See also ==
- Women in the United States House of Representatives
- List of African-American United States representatives

U.S. House of Representatives
Preceded by Lionel Van Deerlin	Member of the U.S. House of Representatives from California's 37th congressional district 1973–1975	Succeeded by Jerry Pettis
Preceded by Alphonzo Bell	Member of the U.S. House of Representatives from California's 28th congressional district 1975–1979	Succeeded by Julian Dixon
Preceded by Martha Griffiths	Chair of the House Beauty Shop Committee; 1975–1979	Position abolished
Preceded by Charles Rangel	Chair of the Congressional Black Caucus; 1976–1977	Succeeded by Parren Mitchell
Political offices
Preceded by Edmund D. Edelman	Chair of Los Angeles County; 1993–1994	Succeeded by Gloria Molina
Preceded by Zev Yaroslavsky	Chair of Los Angeles County; 1997–1998	Succeeded by Don Knabe
Preceded by Zev Yaroslavsky	Chair of Los Angeles County; 2002–2003	Succeeded by Don Knabe
Preceded by Zev Yaroslavsky	Chair of Los Angeles County; 2007–2008	Succeeded by Don Knabe
U.S. order of precedence (ceremonial)
Preceded by Mike Gallagher as Former U.S. Representative	Order of precedence of the United States as Former U.S. Representative	Succeeded by Jay Kim as Former U.S. Representative
