= Baxter Ward =

American politician

- Ward in 1969

Chair of Los Angeles County
- In office December 2, 1975 – December 6, 1977
- Preceded by: James A. Hayes
- Succeeded by: Kenneth Hahn

Chair Pro Tem of Los Angeles County
- In office December 3, 1974 – December 2, 1975
- Preceded by: Office Established
- Succeeded by: Edmund D. Edelman
- In office December 4, 1979 – December 2, 1980
- Preceded by: James A. Hayes
- Succeeded by: Peter F. Schabarum

Member of the Los Angeles County Board of Supervisors from District 5
- In office 1972–1980
- Preceded by: Warren Dorn
- Succeeded by: Michael D. Antonovich

Personal details
- Born: November 5, 1919 Superior, Wisconsin, U.S.
- Died: February 4, 2002 (aged 82) Kirkland, Washington, U.S.
- Party: Democratic
- Spouse: Karen
- Children: Torrey

Baxter Ward Schwellenbach (November 5, 1919 – February 4, 2002) was an American television news anchor and politician who served two terms on the Los Angeles County Board of Supervisors. Prior to his election on the board, he ran third in an unsuccessful bid to unseat Sam Yorty for Mayor of Los Angeles in 1969.

== Background ==
The nephew of Lewis B. Schwellenbach, Ward was born in Superior, Wisconsin, and grew up in Ephrata, Washington. Ward served as a Los Angeles County Supervisor from 1972 to 1980. As supervisor, Ward was an early advocate for passenger rail transportation in the county, something Los Angeles had lacked since the abandonment of the Pacific Electric Railway in the 1950s.

Under Ward, L. A. County purchased eight rail cars from the El Camino in an attempt to bootstrap commuter rail in the greater Los Angeles area. Baxter Ward's initial effort failed, dubbed "Baxter's Choo-Choo" by its numerous contemporary critics, and although the purchased cars were used on Amtrak's San Diegan for six months in 1978, the criticism stuck, ultimately contributing to his 1980 election loss to Michael D. Antonovich. The original commuter rail route envisioned by Ward eventually did come to fruition in the form of Metrolink's Orange County Line some years after the end of his career as a Los Angeles County Supervisor.

During the 1950s and early 60s he introduced a non-fiction documentary television show called Adventure Tomorrow with Dr. Martin L. Klein, which presented technology of the early Space Age. The program's producer, George Van Valkenburg described the series as covering anything that moves, flies or explodes. Ward also worked as a television news anchor first at KCOP-Channel 13, and then with KABC-Channel 7 in Los Angeles before he ran for Mayor. He ran for mayor of Los Angeles one last time in 1989 against Mayor Tom Bradley.

Ward died in 2002, after suffering from lung cancer.

Preceded by James A. Hayes	Chair of Los Angeles County; 1975 - 1977	Succeeded by Kenneth Hahn
Preceded by Office Established; James A. Hayes	Chair Pro Tem of Los Angeles County; 1974 - 1975; 1979 - 1980	Succeeded by Edmund D. Edelman; Peter F. Schabarum
Preceded by Warren Dorn	Los Angeles County Board of Supervisors; 5th district 1972—1980	Succeeded by Michael D. Antonovich
