= Don Knabe =

American politician

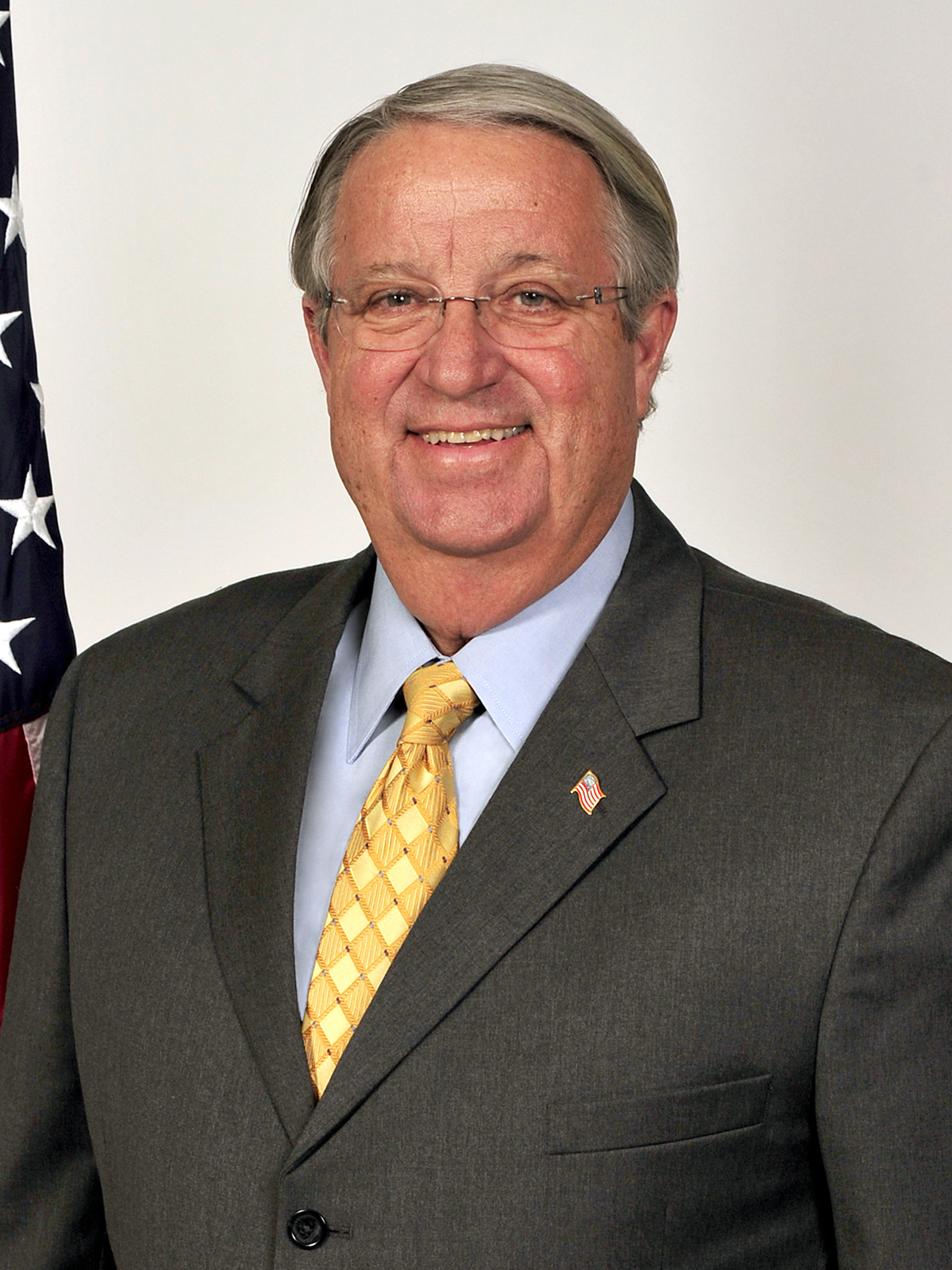
- Official portrait, 2012

Member of the Los Angeles County Board of Supervisors from the 4th district
- In office December 1, 1996 – November 30, 2016
- Preceded by: Deane Dana
- Succeeded by: Janice Hahn

Chair of Los Angeles County
- In office December 3, 2013 – December 2, 2014
- Preceded by: Mark Ridley-Thomas
- Succeeded by: Michael D. Antonovich (Mayor)
- In office December 2, 2008 – December 8, 2009
- Preceded by: Yvonne Brathwaite Burke
- Succeeded by: Gloria Molina
- In office December 2, 2003 – December 7, 2004
- Preceded by: Yvonne Brathwaite Burke
- Succeeded by: Gloria Molina
- In office December 8, 1998 – December 7, 1999
- Preceded by: Yvonne Brathwaite Burke
- Succeeded by: Gloria Molina

Chair Pro Tem of Los Angeles County
- In office December 4, 2012 – December 3, 2013
- Preceded by: Mark Ridley-Thomas
- Succeeded by: Michael D. Antonovich (Mayor Pro Tem)
- In office December 4, 2007 – December 2, 2008
- Preceded by: Yvonne Brathwaite Burke
- Succeeded by: Gloria Molina
- In office December 3, 2002 – December 2, 2003
- Preceded by: Yvonne Brathwaite Burke
- Succeeded by: Gloria Molina
- In office December 2, 1997 – December 8, 1998
- Preceded by: Yvonne Brathwaite Burke
- Succeeded by: Gloria Molina

Personal details
- Born: Donald R. Knabe; October 15, 1943 (age 82) Illinois
- Party: Republican
- Spouse: Julie Gillbreath
- Children: 2
- Website: knabe.com

Donald R. Knabe (/kˈnɑːbiː/) (born October 15, 1943) is an American politician who is a former member of the Los Angeles County Board of Supervisors serving the fourth District.

== Education and early political career ==
Knabe attended Graceland University and graduated with a degree in business administration. After enlisting in the U.S. Navy, Knabe settled in Cerritos. The Knabes owned a small business, and Knabe entered politics in 1978 as one of several candidates for the GOP nomination to replace Del M. Clawson as Congressman from the 33rd District (Downey-Norwalk-Whittier). Knabe lost to La Mirada Mayor Wayne R. Grisham, but carried his home area. In 1980, he was elected to the Cerritos City Council on the basis of growth issues. Knabe took a job with Supervisor Deane Dana's office in 1982, soon advancing to Chief of Staff.

In 1987, Knabe considered running as a Republican for the state Senate in a special election. However, he backed down in favor of Grisham, whose Congressional seat had been redistricted and was now a state Assemblyman. Grisham lost the special election to Democratic Norwalk City Councilman Cecil Green by a larger-than expected margin, and Republicans immediately concluded that the younger, more energetic Knabe should have been the nominee. Knabe retired from the City Council in 1988 to run for the state Senate. After a hard-fought and expensive campaign, Green defeated Knabe by 51% to 49%.

== Fourth District Supervisor, Los Angeles County ==
In 1996, Deane Dana, the former Supervisor of the 4th District, announced that he would retire in December of that year, after serving 16 years in office. Don Knabe, who had served as Dana's chief deputy since 1982, ran to fill the vacated seat. During the campaign, he raised more than $2.6 million, with Dana's campaign committee spending more than $152,000 on Knabe's behalf. The majority of the campaign contributions came from special interest groups. In the non-partisan primary, he finished first with 40% of the vote. In the general election, he defeated former Rolling Hills Mayor Gordana Swanson, who had given Dana a tough race in 1992.

A moderate Republican, Knabe instituted a safe-haven law or baby hatch in 2002, where mothers can leave their baby at a fire station, lifeguard headquarters, or hospital within 72 hours of their birth. The program was instituted after several publicized cases of child abandonment and infanticide. The program was quickly adopted statewide. As of August 31, 2011, 87 babies, in Los Angeles County alone, have been safely surrendered.

Knabe was the Chairman for the 2010 session. He was reelected in the June 3, 2008 election.

Cerritos Community Regional Park was retitled to its current name on November 30, 2016, to honor Knabe. It was recommended by former mayor and supervisor Michael D. Antonovich.

=== Controversies ===
Knabe's son, Matt Knabe, is a partner at a major Los Angeles lobbying firm, Englander, Knabe & Allen and is a registered County lobbyist. Despite the family ties, Knabe routinely voted on board matters involving clients that his son and the latter's firm represented (including the award of government contracts), instead of recusing himself. Because of the father-son relationship, local media, in particular the Los Angeles Times, regularly raised ethical concerns over perceived or real conflicts of interest.

Board matters on which Knabe did not recuse himself included contract awards that circumvented standard government procurement processes and other actions that had a financial impact on Matt Knabe's firm:

- March 2005: A $7.4 million contract award with Global 360 BGS Inc. that Knabe voted to approve. The said company paid $72,000 to Matt Knabe's firm. Later that year, J.D. Knabe & Associates, the firm owned by Knabe's wife, Julie, arranged an event for Global 360.
- June 2006: Knabe voted to approve the expansion of a controversial air park in Agua Dulce, California. The firm paid Matt Knabe's firm $32,800.
- June 2006: Knabe voted to approve a permit for Browning-Ferris Industries (BFI), a landfill operator in Sunshine Canyon. BFI had paid Matt Knabe's firm more than $83,000.
- February 2011: Knabe voted to award a $1.5 million contract to TRC Solutions, a client of Matt Knabe's firm.
- December 2011, May 2012: Knabe voted twice to award American Golf Corporation lease extensions to run the County's golf courses. American Golf Corporation is a client of Matt Knabe's lobbying firm. From July 2012 through January 2013, AGC paid Matt Knabe's firm a total of $67,500. The company also sponsors the Knabe Cup, an annual golf tournament for high schoolers held by Knabe.
- March 2012: Knabe voted to award a $1.75 million no-bid contract award with Enterprise Rent-A-Car, a client of Matt Knabe's lobbying firm. Following a SoCal Connected broadcast on the nature of the contract award, Supervisor Antonovich held a motion to investigate the contract award. In January 2013, the Department of the Auditor-Controller published its findings to a limited investigation regarding the Enterprise Rent-a-Car no-bid contract award, concluding that the solicitation had been conducted improperly. From July 2012 to January 2013, Enterprise Rent-a-Car paid Matt Knabe's firm $97,500.
- July 2012: Knabe voted to award a $22,305,549 contract with Maximus Inc., a client of Matt Knabe's firm. From July 2012 to January 2013, Maximus reported paying Matt Knabe's firm a total of $48,000.
- January 2013: On a motion initiated by Knabe, Knabe voted to waive the 15% gross receipts fee (typically applied for use of County facilities), for Los Angeles County Lifeguard Association (a client of Matt Knabe's firm), which sponsors United States Lifesaving Association National Lifeguard and Junior Lifeguard Championships, for the company's use of the Manhattan Beach Pier. From July 2012 to January 2013, the said company had paid Matt Knabe's firm a total of $45,000.

Knabe was criticized for his use of taxpayer-funded discretionary funds (each supervisor is allocated a $3.4 million spending account), including the employment of an armed driver earning an annual salary of US$90,000.

== Personal life ==
Knabe is married to Julie Knabe née Gillbreath. Julie operates J.D. Knabe & Associates, a customer relations firm. The Knabes have two sons, Curt and Matt, both graduates of Pepperdine University. Knabe's son Matt is a partner at a major Los Angeles lobbying firm, Englander, Knabe & Allen. Knabe is a member of New Life Community Church in Artesia, California.

Political offices
Preceded by Deane Dana	Los Angeles County Board of Supervisors; 4th District; 1997—2016	Succeeded by Janice Hahn
Preceded by Mark Ridley-Thomas	Chair of Los Angeles County; 2013-2014; 2008-2009; 2003-2004; 1998-1999	Succeeded by Michael D. Antonovich (Mayor)
Preceded by Yvonne Brathwaite Burke	Chair of Los Angeles County; 2013-2014; 2008-2009; 2003-2004; 1998-1999	Succeeded by Gloria Molina
Preceded by Mark Ridley-Thomas	Chair Pro Tem of Los Angeles County; 2012-2013; 2007-2008; 2002-2003; 1997-1998	Succeeded by Michael D. Antonovich (Mayor Pro Tem)
Preceded by Yvonne Brathwaite Burke	Chair Pro Tem of Los Angeles County; 2012-2013; 2007-2008; 2002-2003; 1997-1998	Succeeded by Gloria Molina
