= Michael D. Antonovich =

American politician

Michael Antonovich
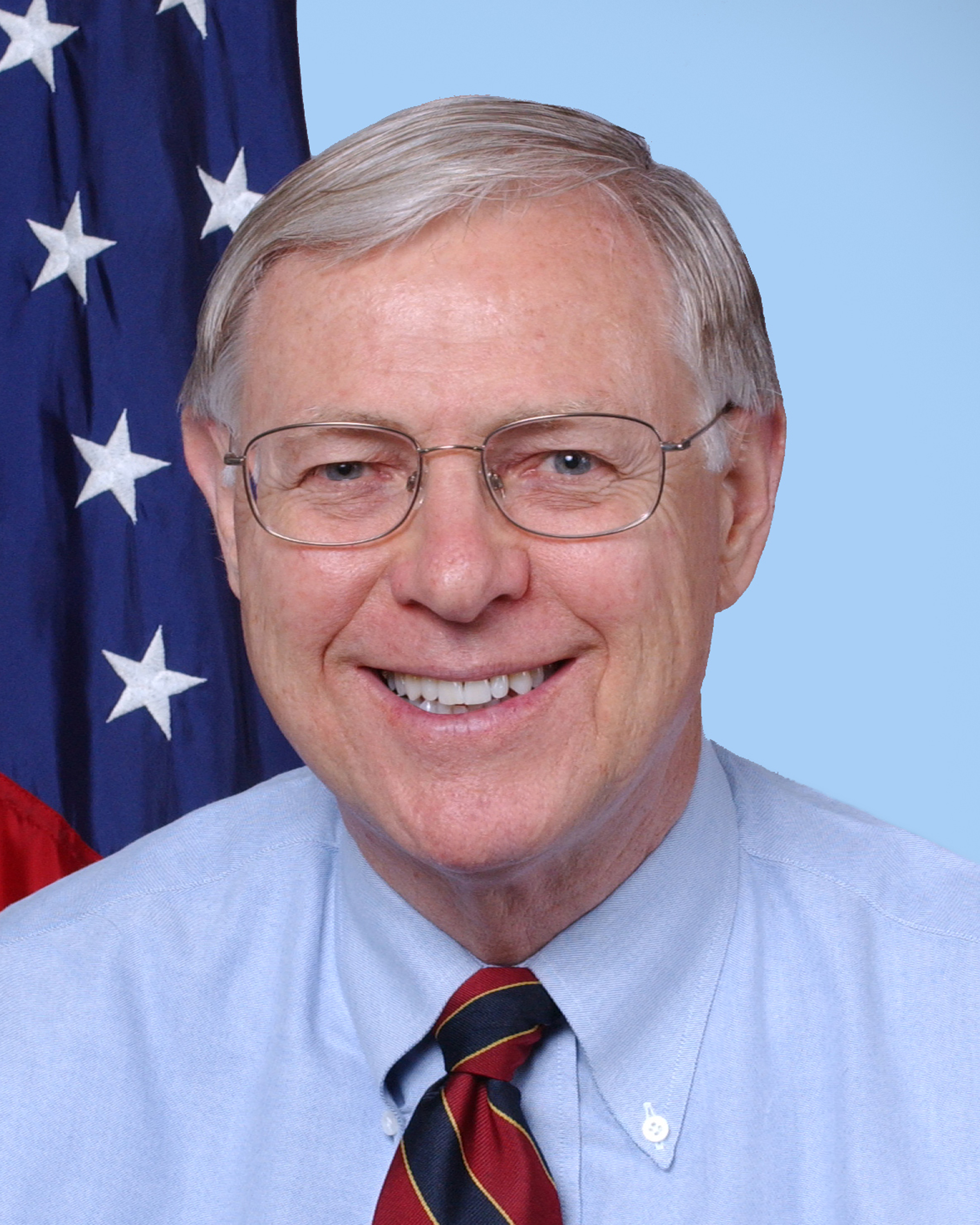

Member of the Los Angeles County Board of Supervisors from District 5
- In office December 1, 1980 – November 30, 2016
- Preceded by: Baxter Ward
- Succeeded by: Kathryn Barger
Supervisory positions
Mayor of Los Angeles County
In office December 2, 2014 – December 8, 2015
Preceded by	Don Knabe (Chair)
Succeeded by	Hilda Solis (Chair)
In office December 7, 2010 – December 6, 2011
Preceded by	Gloria Molina (Chair)
Succeeded by	Zev Yaroslavsky (Chair)
In office December 6, 2005 – December 5, 2006
Preceded by	Gloria Molina (Chair)
Succeeded by	Zev Yaroslavsky (Chair)
In office December 5, 2000 – December 4, 2001
Preceded by	Gloria Molina (Chair)
Succeeded by	Zev Yaroslavsky (Chair)
In office December 5, 1995 – December 3, 1996
Preceded by	Gloria Molina (Chair)
Succeeded by	Zev Yaroslavsky (Chair)
In office December 4, 1990 – December 3, 1991
Preceded by	Peter F. Schabarum (Chair)
Succeeded by	Deane Dana (Chair)
In office December 2, 1986 – December 8, 1987
Preceded by	Peter F. Schabarum (Chair)
Succeeded by	Deane Dana (Chair)
In office December 6, 1983 – December 4, 1984
Preceded by	Peter F. Schabarum (Chair)
Succeeded by	Edmund D. Edelman (Chair)
Mayor Pro Tem of Los Angeles County
In office December 3, 2013 – December 2, 2014
Preceded by	Don Knabe (Chair Pro Tem)
Succeeded by	Hilda Solis (Chair Pro Tem)
In office December 8, 2009 – December 7, 2010
Preceded by	Gloria Molina (Chair Pro Tem)
Succeeded by	Zev Yaroslavsky (Chair Pro Tem)
In office December 7, 2004 – December 6, 2005
Preceded by	Gloria Molina (Chair Pro Tem)
Succeeded by	Zev Yaroslavsky (Chair Pro Tem)
In office December 7, 1999 – December 5, 2000
Preceded by	Gloria Molina (Chair Pro Tem)
Succeeded by	Zev Yaroslavsky (Chair Pro Tem)
In office December 6, 1994 – December 5, 1995
Preceded by	Gloria Molina (Chair Pro Tem)
Succeeded by	Zev Yaroslavsky (Chair Pro Tem)
In office December 21, 1989 – December 4, 1990
Preceded by	Peter F. Schabarum (Chair Pro Tem)
Succeeded by	Deane Dana (Chair Pro Tem)
In office December 3, 1985 – December 2, 1986
Preceded by	Peter F. Schabarum (Chair Pro Tem)
Succeeded by	Deane Dana (Chair Pro Tem)

Personal details
- Born: Michael Daniel Antonovich; August 12, 1939 (age 87) Los Angeles, California, U.S.
- Party: Republican
- Spouse: Christine Hu Huiling
- Children: Michael Jr. Mary Christine; Dwight Manley
- Education: California State University, Los Angeles
- Awards: California Legion of Merit

Military service
- Allegiance: United States of America State of California
- Branch/service: California State Military Reserve
- Years of service: 1 January 2003 – 1 July 2008
- Rank: Lieutenant colonel (CA)
- Unit: Joint Forces Training Base - Los Alamitos

Michael Dennis Antonovich (born August 12, 1939) is an American politician who was Mayor of Los Angeles County and a member of the Los Angeles County Board of Supervisors. He represented the Fifth District, which covers northern Los Angeles County, including the Antelope Valley, Santa Clarita, Pasadena, and parts of the San Fernando and San Gabriel valleys.

== Education and early career ==
Antonovich was born in Los Angeles, California, and attended Thomas Alva Edison Junior High, where one of his classmates was Henry Waxman. He graduated from John Marshall High School and enlisted in the United States Army Reserve in 1957. A member of Sigma Nu fraternity, Antonovich graduated from California State University, Los Angeles in 1963 with a bachelor's degree and a master's degree in 1966. Antonovich taught in the Los Angeles Unified School District and later at Pepperdine University.

== Political career ==
In 1969, Antonovich was elected to the newly formed Los Angeles Community College District Board of Trustees.

In 1972, he was elected to the California State Assembly and for three terms represented Glendale, Burbank, Sunland, Tujunga, Atwater, Griffith Park, Lakeview Terrace and Sun Valley. He served as a Republican whip in the Assembly from 1976 to 1978.

Antonovich ran unsuccessfully for the Republican nomination for Lieutenant Governor of California in 1978 against Mike Curb. After Curb defeated him in the primary, Antonovich declined to specifically endorse Curb in the general election, but instead endorsed the entire Republican ticket. Curb defeated incumbent Mervyn Dymally in the general election.

In 1984 Antonovich was elected chairman of the California Republican Party and served for two years.

He was Chairman of the Board of Supervisors (to which he was first elected in 1980) in 1983, 1987 and 1991 and as the so-called "Mayor of Los Angeles County" in 1983, 1987, 1991, 2001 and 2006.

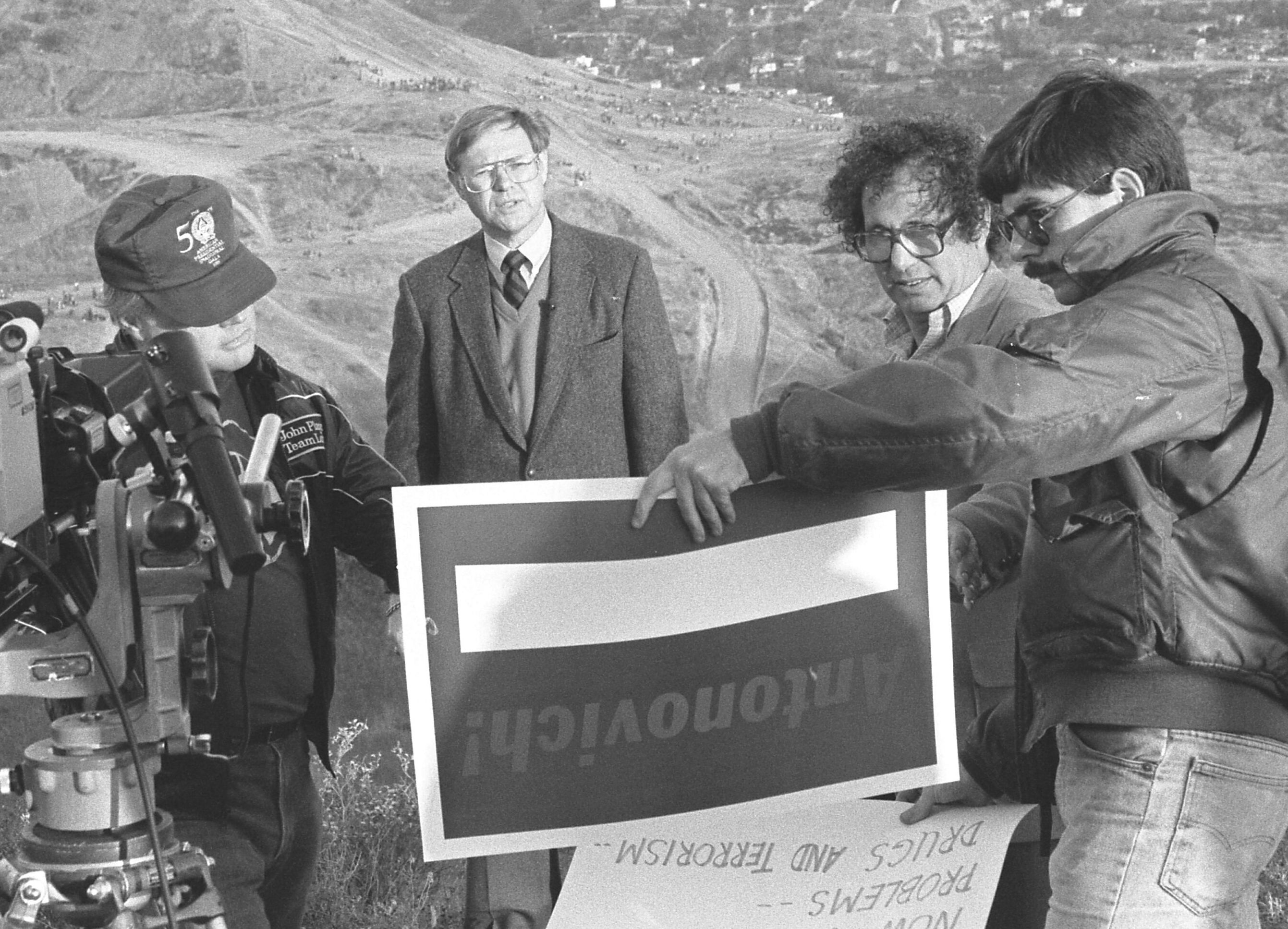
Antonovich filming a Senatorial ad in 1986

He ran for the U.S. Senate in 1986 in the 13-candidate Republican primary. Antonovich received the endorsement of television evangelist Pat Robertson. He finished in third place with 9% of the vote. Congressman Ed Zschau went on to lose to the incumbent, Alan Cranston, in the general election. Antonovich lost the San Fernando Valley to Herschensohn.

From 2007 to 2013, Antonovich received $1,862,796.59 in campaign contributions, reported by Los Angeles Registrar-Recorder/County Clerk records.

Antonovich served nine four-year terms on the Board of Supervisors and served until 2016, when a limit of three consecutive terms imposed by voters in 2002 forced him to leave office. That year, Antonovich ran for California State Senator for the 25th District, which includes the cities of Burbank, Glendale, Pasadena, La Canada Flintridge, South Pasadena, Monrovia, Bradbury, Duarte, Glendora, San Dimas, La Verne, Claremont, Upland, Sierra Madre, the unincorporated communities of Altadena, East Pasadena, and La Crescenta-Montrose, and the Los Angeles neighborhoods of Atwater Village and Sunland-Tujunga. He lost to Democrat Anthony Portantino, 57 percent to 43 percent.

Michael D. Antonovich Trail near San Dimas, California, and Michael D. Antonovich Regional Park at Joughin Ranch in the Santa Susana Mountains are named after him.

=== California bullet train ===
Antonovich played an important role in shaping the route that California's proposed bullet train project would take. Engineers had determined in a 1999 report that the preferred route for a bullet train between Los Angeles and San Francisco would be the most direct through the Tejon Pass. However, Antonovich argued that the train should be diverted through the Mojave Desert communities of Lancaster and Palmdale in his district, which was estimated to increase the cost of the project by 16%. Critics described the change as political horse-trading that raised the cost and complexity of the project and sacrificed travel time. In a 2022 report, the New York Times linked the maneuver to a connection between Antonovich and real estate developer Jerry Epstein.

=== Chemerinsky appointment ===
Antonovich objected to the appointment of Duke University professor Erwin Chemerinsky to be dean of the new law school at the University of California, Irvine, and lobbied against it. The university rescinded the appointment, then later restored it.

== Personal life ==
Antonovich is of Croatian descent.

On February 15, 1998, he married Christine Hu Huiling, a Mandarin-speaking actress from Dalian, China, before 900 guests; Red Buttons and Pat Boone were lay lectors. Hu has two children with Antonovich: a son, Michael Jr., born in 1999, and a daughter, Mary Christine, born in 2000. In 2017, Antonovich learned through an Ancestry.com DNA test that he had fathered a son, Dwight Manley, who was born in 1965 and placed for adoption.

California Assembly
Preceded by Carlos Moorhead	California State Assemblyman; 43rd District; January 8, 1973 - November 30, 1974	Succeeded by Howard Berman
Preceded by Jim Keysor	California State Assemblyman; 41st District; December 2, 1974 - November 30, 1978	Succeeded by Pat Nolan
Political offices
Preceded by Baxter Ward	Los Angeles County Board of Supervisors; 5th District; 1980–2016	Succeeded by Kathryn Barger
Preceded by Mark Ridley-Thomas (Chair)	Chair of Los Angeles County; 2014-2015; 2010-2011; 2005-2006; 2001-2000; 1995-1996; 1990-1991; 1986-1987; 1983-1984	Succeeded by Hilda Solis (Chair)
Preceded by Gloria Molina (Chair)	Chair of Los Angeles County; 2014-2015; 2010-2011; 2005-2006; 2001-2000; 1995-1996; 1990-1991; 1986-1987; 1983-1984	Succeeded by Zev Yaroslavsky (Chair)
Preceded by Peter F. Schabarum (Chair)	Chair of Los Angeles County; 2014-2015; 2010-2011; 2005-2006; 2001-2000; 1995-1996; 1990-1991; 1986-1987; 1983-1984	Succeeded by Deane Dana (Chair)
Preceded by Peter F. Schabarum (Chair)	Chair of Los Angeles County; 2014-2015; 2010-2011; 2005-2006; 2001-2000; 1995-1996; 1990-1991; 1986-1987; 1983-1984	Succeeded by Edmund D. Edelman (Chair)
Preceded by Don Knabe (Chair Pro Tem)	Chair Pro Tem of Los Angeles County; 2013-2014; 2009-2010; 2004-2005; 1999-2000; 1994-1995; 1989-1990; 1985-1986	Succeeded by Hilda Solis (Chair Pro Tem)
Preceded by Gloria Molina (Chair Pro Tem)	Chair Pro Tem of Los Angeles County; 2013-2014; 2009-2010; 2004-2005; 1999-2000; 1994-1995; 1989-1990; 1985-1986	Succeeded by Zev Yaroslavsky (Chair Pro Tem)
Preceded by Peter F. Schabarum (Chair Pro Tem)	Chair Pro Tem of Los Angeles County; 2013-2014; 2009-2010; 2004-2005; 1999-2000; 1994-1995; 1989-1990; 1985-1986	Succeeded by Deane Dana (Chair Pro Tem)

Party political offices
Preceded by Ed Reinecke	Chair of the California Republican Party; 1985–1987	Succeeded by Bob Naylor
