= Deane Dana =

American politician

Member of the Los Angeles County Board of Supervisors from the 4th District
- In office 1980–1996
- Preceded by: Yvonne Brathwaite Burke
- Succeeded by: Don Knabe

Chair of Los Angeles County
- In office December 3, 1991 – December 8, 1992
- Preceded by: Michael D. Antonovich (Mayor)
- Succeeded by: Edmund D. Edelman
- In office December 8, 1987 – December 6, 1988
- Preceded by: Michael D. Antonovich (Mayor Pro Tem)
- Succeeded by: Edmund D. Edelman

Chair Pro Tem of Los Angeles County
- In office December 4, 1990 – December 3, 1991
- Preceded by: Michael D. Antonovich (Mayor Pro Tem)
- Succeeded by: Edmund D. Edelman
- In office December 2, 1986 – December 8, 1987
- Preceded by: Michael D. Antonovich (Mayor Pro Tem)
- Succeeded by: Edmund D. Edelman
- In office December 7, 1982 – December 6, 1983
- Preceded by: Peter F. Schabarum
- Succeeded by: Edmund D. Edelman

Personal details
- Born: July 9, 1926 New York City, US
- Died: April 21, 2005 (aged 78) Torrance, California, United States
- Party: Republican
- Education: Stevens Institute of Technology

Deane Dana Jr. (July 9, 1926 - April 21, 2005) was a member of the Los Angeles County Board of Supervisors.

Dana was born in New York City. He studied engineering at Stevens Institute of Technology in Hoboken, New Jersey.

After moving to California with his family, he lived in Long Beach and later, Rancho Palos Verdes. He worked as an engineer for 27 years at Pacific Telephone & Telegraph, and became an active participant in the local Republican Party and a close friend of future governor George Deukmejian, working in each of Deukmejian's campaigns from 1962 on.

In 1980, Dana was elected over Yvonne Brathwaite Burke to represent District 4 on the Los Angeles County Board of Supervisors. He served until he retired in 1996, when his friend and chief of staff, Don Knabe, was elected to replace him. Dana served as Chair of Los Angeles County and was president of the Coliseum Commission and the Southern California Regional Airport Authority. The Deane Dana Friendship Park and Nature Center in San Pedro is named in his honor.

Deane Dana died April 21, 2005, at Torrance Memorial Hospital in Torrance, California. He is buried in Green Hills Memorial Park in Rancho Palos Verdes.

His son Deane Dana III ran unsuccessfully for the Sacramento City Council in 2014.

Political offices
Preceded by Yvonne Brathwaite Burke	Los Angeles County Board of Supervisors; 4th District; 1980–1996	Succeeded by Don Knabe
Preceded by Michael D. Antonovich (Mayor)	Chair of Los Angeles County; 1991–1992; 1987-1988	Succeeded by Edmund D. Edelman
Preceded by Michael D. Antonovich (Mayor Pro Tem); Peter F. Schabarum	Chair Pro Tem of Los Angeles County; 1990–1991; 1986–1987; 1982-1983	Succeeded by Edmund D. Edelman
