= Los Angeles's 14th City Council district =

American legislative district

Councilmember
Ysabel Jurado; D–Highland Park
since December 9, 2024
- Demographics: 13.6% White; 4.2% Black; 68.1% Hispanic; 12.4% Asian; 0.2% Other
- Population (2020): 264,741
- Registered voters (2017): 123,551
- Website: cd14.lacity.gov

Los Angeles's 14th City Council district is one of the fifteen districts in the Los Angeles City Council. The district, which has a large Latin American population, includes the neighborhoods of Boyle Heights, Downtown Los Angeles and parts of Northeast Los Angeles. It is currently represented by Democrat Ysabel Jurado since 2024. she beat previous councilmember Kevin de León that year.

The district was created in 1925 after a new city charter was passed, which replaced the former "at large" voting system for a nine-member council with a district system with a 15-member council. Since its creation, it hasn't strayed from its original location, always residing in the Northeast Los Angeles and Downtown Los Angeles areas, which neighborhoods have been historically Latino. The district has been involved in scandals with the suspension of member José Huizar in 2020 and the audio scandal of Kevin de León in 2022.

== Geography ==
District 14 consists of all or part of the neighborhoods of the Downtown, Boyle Heights, Eagle Rock, Highland Park, El Sereno, Garvanza, Glassell Park, Lincoln Heights, and Monterey Hills. The Boyle Heights and Northeast sections are connected by a narrow strip of land.

The district is completely within California's 34th congressional district as well as residing within California's 26th State Senate district and California's 52nd and 54th State Assembly district.

=== Historical boundaries ===
Historical boundaries have not differed from the modern bounties, always representing Eagle Rock and Highland Park. As the city's population increased, it has expanded southward. In 1925, the district included the communities of Eagle Rock, Highland Park and Annandale before expanding westward to Allesandro Street in 1928. In 1933, the District was expanded to have the boundaries at South Pasadena, Pasadena, Glendale, and Glendale Boulevard, before the western boundary was moved to meet at Griffith Park and including the Atwater area in 1935. In 1955, the district expanded to include Rose Hill.

In 1971, the district now began in the East Los Angeles Mexican-American barrios of El Sereno and Lincoln Heights, extending westward across the Pasadena Freeway to Anglo middle-class homes in Glassell Park, Highland Park, Hermon, and Eagle Rock through Griffith Park. Around the western edge of the district is the Los Feliz District, with some of the city's more expensive homes." In 1986, Los Feliz was removed from the district. Southern reach included El Sereno, College Avenue, Huntington Drive and portions of Alhambra Avenue and Valley Boulevard, then across the San Bernardino Freeway to Brooklyn Avenue, East Beverly Boulevard, Fourth Street and Whittier Boulevard.

== List of members representing the district ==
Councilmember	Party	Dates	Electoral history
District established July 1, 1925
Isaac Colton Ash (Eagle Rock)	Republican	July 1, 1925 – June 30, 1927	Elected in 1925. Retired.
William G. Bonelli (Eagle Rock)	Republican	July 1, 1927 – June 30, 1929	Elected in 1927. Retired to run for Mayor of Los Angeles.
Charles A. Holland (Highland Park)	Democratic	July 1, 1929 – June 30, 1931	Elected in 1929. Lost re-election.
Edward L. Thrasher (Glassell Park)	Democratic	July 1, 1931 – June 30, 1943	Elected in 1931. Re-elected in 1933. Re-elected in 1935. Re-elected in 1937. Re-elected in 1939. Lost re-election.
John C. Holland (Highland Park)	Republican	July 1, 1943 – June 30, 1967	Elected in 1943. Re-elected in 1945. Re-elected in 1947. Re-elected in 1949. Re-elected in 1951. Re-elected in 1953. Re-elected in 1955. Re-elected in 1959. Re-elected in 1963. Retired.
Art Snyder (Eagle Rock)	Republican	July 1, 1967 – October 4, 1985	Elected in 1967. Re-elected in 1971. Re-elected in 1975. Re-elected in 1979. Re-elected in 1983. Resigned.
Vacant		October 4, 1985 – October 10, 1985	
Richard Alatorre (Eagle Rock)	Democratic	October 10, 1985 – June 30, 1999	Elected to finish Snyder's term. Re-elected in 1989. Re-elected in 1991. Re-elected in 1995. Retired.
Nick Pacheco (Eagle Rock)	Democratic	July 1, 1999 – June 30, 2003	Elected in 1999. Lost re-election.
Antonio Villaraigosa (Eagle Rock)	Democratic	July 1, 2003 – July 1, 2005	Elected in 2003. Retired to run for Mayor of Los Angeles.
Vacant		July 1, 2005 – December 1, 2006	
José Huizar (Boyle Heights)	Democratic	December 1, 2006 – August 8, 2020	Elected to finish Villaraigosa's term. Re-elected in 2007. Re-elected in 2011. Re-elected in 2015. Suspended after a bribery indictment.
Vacant		August 8, 2020 – October 15, 2020	
Kevin de León (Eagle Rock)	Democratic	October 15, 2020 – December 9, 2024	Elected, then appointed to finish Huizar's term. Re-elected in 2020. Lost re-election.
Ysabel Jurado (Highland Park)	Democratic	December 9, 2024 – present	Elected in 2024.
