= California Assembly Bill 962 (2009) =

California State Legislature
- Full name: Assembly Bill 962
- Introduced: February 26, 2009
- Assembly voted: September 11, 2009
- Senate voted: September 10, 2009
- Signed into law: October 11, 2009
- Sponsor: Kevin de León
- Governor: Arnold Schwarzenegger
- Code: California Penal Code
- Section: 12060, 12061, 12136, 12137, 12138
- Website: http://info.sen.ca.gov/pub/09-10/bill/asm/ab_0951-1000/ab_962_bill_20091011_chaptered.html

Status: Struck down

California Assembly Bill 962 (2009) (AB 962) was a gun control law in California, authored by Assemblyman Kevin de León, and signed into law by Governor of California Arnold Schwarzenegger on October 11, 2009. AB 962 was set to take effect on February 1, 2011, but was ruled unconstitutional by Fresno Superior Court Judge Jeffrey Hamilton on January 18, 2011, in Parker v. California.

AB 962 would have required that all transfers of ownership of "handgun ammunition" be done in a face-to-face transaction, with the deliverer or transferor being provided bona fide evidence of identity of the purchaser or other transferee. As part of every "handgun ammunition" transfer, AB 962 would have required vendors to record and maintain, for a time period no less than five years: the transaction date, the ammunition brand and caliber, the processor's name, as well as the purchaser's driver license number, signature, name, right thumbprint, residential address, phone number, and date of birth. The bill also aimed to stop felony gang crimes by making it a misdemeanor to possess ammunition while associating with a criminal street gang.

On August 19, 2010, the NRA-CRPA Foundation Legal Action Project filed a lawsuit challenging AB 962. The lead plaintiff in the lawsuit was Tehama County Sheriff Clay Parker. The lawsuit alleged that the mandates in AB 962 were incomprehensible, and that the definition of "handgun ammunition" was unconstitutionally vague.

On January 18, 2011, Fresno Superior Court Judge Jeffrey Hamilton ruled, in Parker v. California, that the definition of "handgun ammunition" was indeed unconstitutionally vague. The Court enjoined enforcement of the bill. Mail order ammunition sales to California therefore continue.

== See also ==
- Gun politics
