= Isaac Colton Ash =

American politician

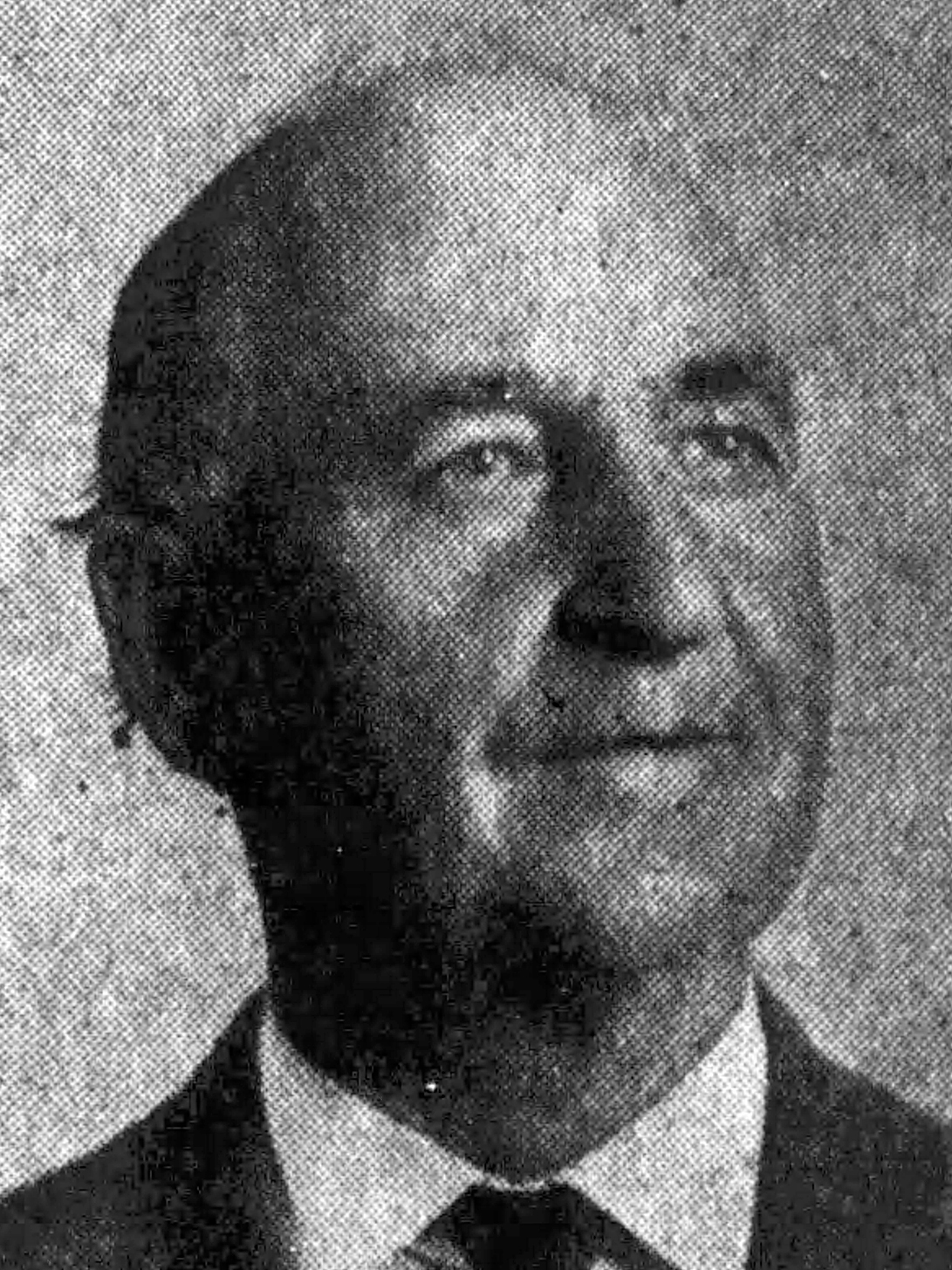
- Ash in 1925

Member of the Los Angeles City Council for the 14th district
- In office July 1, 1925 – June 30, 1927
- Preceded by: District established
- Succeeded by: William G. Bonelli

Personal details
- Born: January 26, 1891
- Died: June 15, 1933 (aged 42)
- Political party: Republican

Isaac Colton Ash (January 26, 1861 – July 15, 1933) was a banker, real-estate dealer and member of the Los Angeles City Council in the 20th century.

== Biography ==
Ash was born on January 26, 1861, in Shelby County, Indiana, the son of Eli and Mary Hooper Ash, both of Richmond, Virginia. He went to school in Shelby County, then earned a bachelor's degree in 1885 at Purdue University in Indiana. He was married to Sarah Morris of Salt Lake City, Utah, in 1902 in Indianapolis, Indiana. She died in 1928. They had no children. He was a Methodist and a Republican.

Ash worked at Indianapolis Bank and Trust Company for 27 years, where he became vice president and credit manager. Ill health of his wife impelled the pair to move to Los Angeles in 1912, where Ash invested heavily in Highland Park real estate. In 1914 he was vice president of the York Boulevard State Bank.

On July 15, 1933, Ash was stricken with a heart attack shortly after alighting from a streetcar in downtown Los Angeles. At the time of his death, his residence was at 5116 Meridian Avenue, Highland Park. He was survived by two brothers and a sister. Burial was in Forest Lawn Memorial Park, Glendale.

== City Council ==
Ash was the first representative of Los Angeles City Council District 14 after a new city charter was put into effect in 1925, besting incumbent At-Large councilman Edwin T. Baker, 6,364 to 4,202. He did not run for reelection. He was a supporter of the George E. Cryer administration.

Ash's two-year term was marked by controversy over his being appointed by City Controller John B. Powell as one of the "guards" for $15.7 million in bonds that were to be delivered to a bank in New York City — this after Ash had praised Powell and successfully urged the City Council to increase Powell's salary. He "went once before on one of these junkets and he wants to go again," a Los Angeles Times political commentator said. Ash later announced he would not go.

A "large delegation of his constituents . . . hooted and jeered" at Ash during a City Council meeting to protest the paving of Avenue 57 from Highgate Avenue to York Boulevard "within a few feet" of property that he owned. A resident complained that Ash's property value would be increased by $5,000 but that the councilman's land had been omitted from the tax district that would have to pay for the improvement. Ash denied the charge but nevertheless the council abandoned the proceedings.

== Other sources ==
- Chronological Record of Los Angeles City Officials: 1850—1938, Compiled under Direction of Municipal Reference Library City Hall, Los Angeles March 1938 (Reprinted 1966)

Preceded by Office Establish	Los Angeles City Council; 14th district 1925–1927	Succeeded by William George Bonelli
