= José Huizar =

Mexican-American politician (born 1968)

- Official portrait, 2010

Member of the Los Angeles City Council from the 14th district
- In office December 1, 2005 – October 15, 2020
- Preceded by: Antonio Villaraigosa
- Succeeded by: Kevin de León

Personal details
- Born: September 10, 1968 (age 58) Zacatecas, Mexico
- Party: Democratic
- Spouse: Richelle Ríos
- Children: 4
- Education: University of California, Berkeley (BA); University of California, Los Angeles (JD); Princeton University (MPP)
- Criminal information
- Status: Plea bargain
- Convictions: 13 years in federal prison
- Criminal charges: 2 felony counts of racketeering and tax evasion

José Luis Huizar (born September 10, 1968) is a Mexican-American former politician who served as a member of the Los Angeles City Council from 2005 to 2020.

Huizar was elected on November 8, 2005, in a special election to fill the seat vacated by the then-mayor of Los Angeles, Antonio Villaraigosa. He was re-elected to a full four-year term in 2007 and again in 2011. In 2015, he was re-elected but to an extended term due to new city laws.

Huizar was arrested and indicted on June 23, 2020, on federal corruption charges, leading to his suspension from council. In 2023 he pleaded guilty to charges of racketeering and tax evasion. On Jan 26, 2024 he was sentenced to 13 years in prison. Huizar was sentenced by United States District Judge John F. Walter, who also ordered him to pay $443,905 in restitution to the City of Los Angeles and $38,792 in restitution to the IRS.

== Early life and education ==
Huizar was born in the village of Los Morales in the municipality of Jerez, Zacatecas, Mexico, the son of Simón Huizar, a migrant farm worker and later machinist. His mother, Isidra Serrano, was a meatpacking plant worker.

He immigrated with his parents to the Boyle Heights neighborhood of Los Angeles at the age of 3, and attended Salesian High School before attending University of California, Berkeley as an undergraduate. He received a master's degree in Public Affairs and Urban Planning from Princeton University and a Juris Doctor from the UCLA School of Law. In 2004, he became the first Latino to serve on the Princeton Board of Trustees.

== Career ==
=== Los Angeles Unified School Board ===
José Huizar won a seat on the board of the Los Angeles Unified School District on April 10, 2001, as a candidate supported by Mayor Richard Riordan, defeating Ralph Cole with 75% of the vote. He served as member and president of the board until 2005.

== Los Angeles City Council (2005–2020) ==
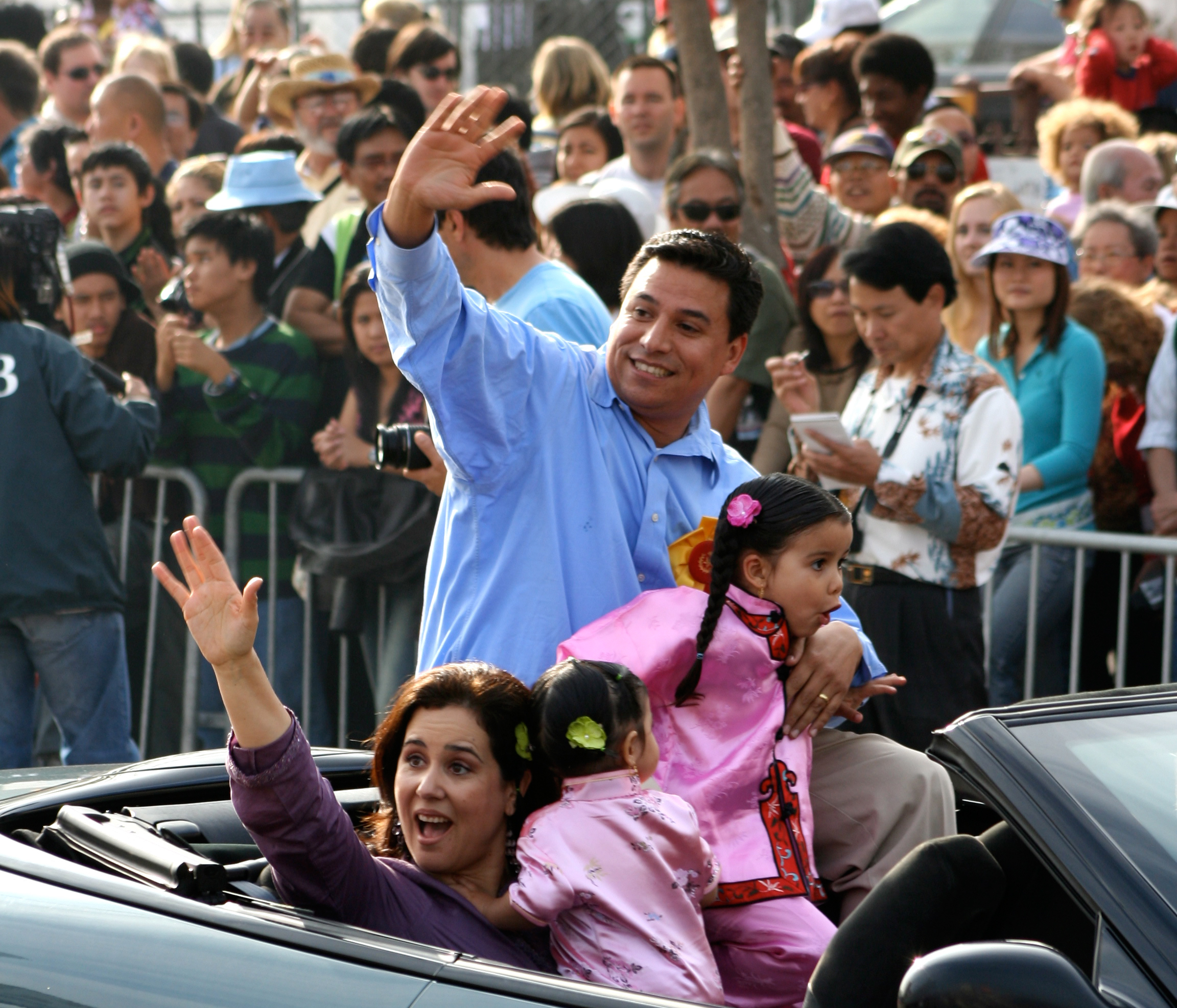
Huizar and his family during a Chinatown parade, 2006

In November 2005 Huizar ran against Nick Pacheco for a seat on the Los Angeles City Council vacated by Antonio Villaraigosa and won. He was reelected to a full four-year term in 2007 and again in 2011. On March 3, 2015, he defeated former Supervisor Gloria Molina, along with three other candidates, to be re-elected to the Los Angeles City Council for a fourth time. He was the first Mexican immigrant elected to the L.A. City Council.

On November 7, 2018, the FBI served search warrants on Huizar's City Hall office and his residence. They removed computers and boxes of files, but did not disclose the purpose of the search.

On November 15, 2018, Los Angeles City Council President Herb Wesson removed Huizar from all of his committee assignments.

On May 28, 2020, Los Angeles Mayor Eric Garcetti and City Council President Nury Martinez called on Huizar to resign. On June 23 he was arrested by federal agents and the City Council suspended him from office.

=== Committees ===
- Planning & Land Use Management (previous)
- Rules, Elections & Intergovernmental Relations (previous vice chair)
- Energy & Environment (chair 2012–13)
- Economic Development (previous)

=== Environmental issues ===
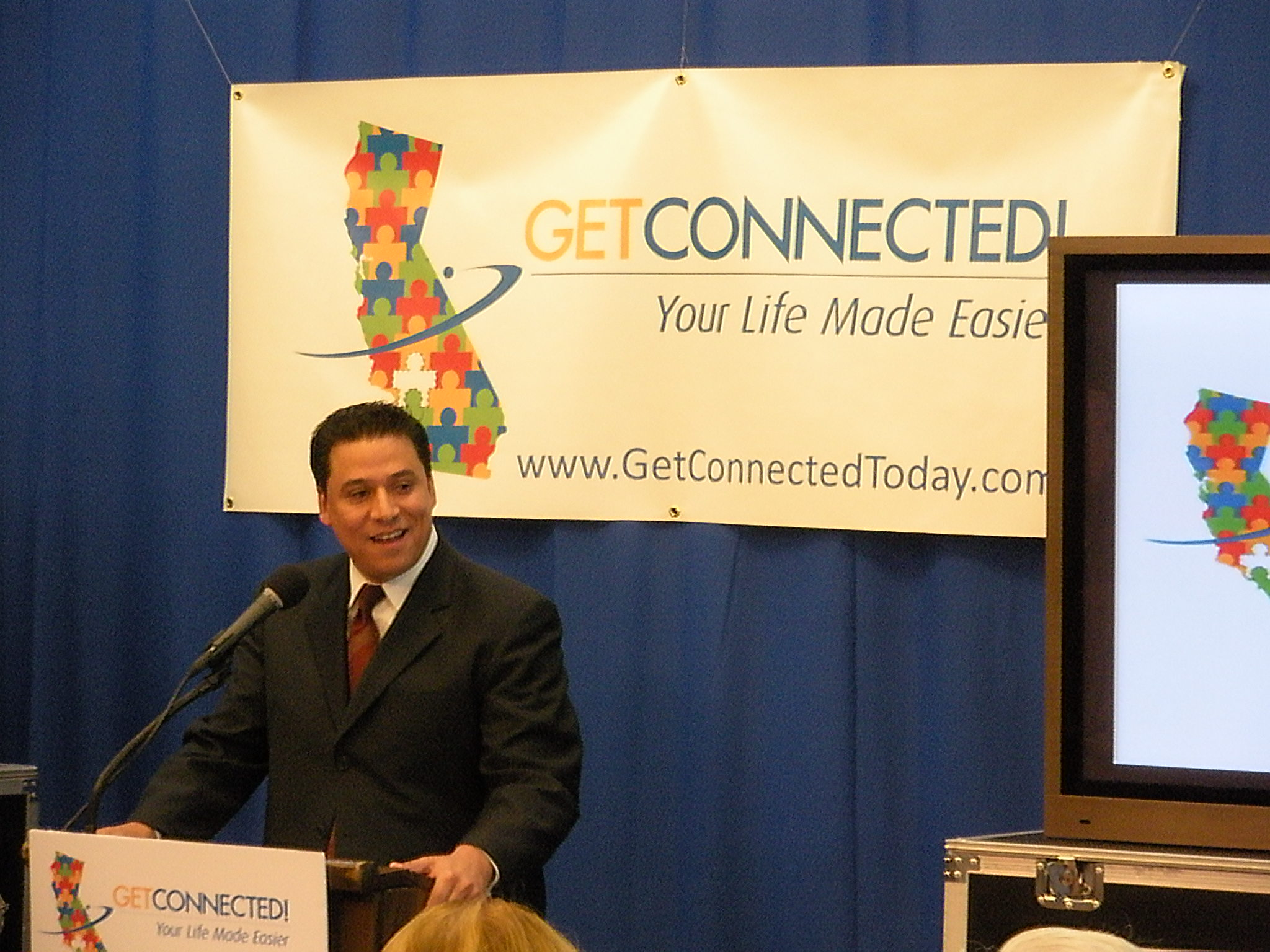
Huizar during a press conference in 2009

Huizar chaired the Los Angeles City Council's Energy & Environment Committee in 2012 and 2013. Under his leadership, the committee pushed forward the single-use plastic bag ban, and worked to expand recycling efforts in commercial and apartment buildings. In 2013, Huizar received the Los Angeles League of Conservation Voters Environmental Champion Award and the Sierra Club's Political Leadership award. He also worked to preserve open space and improve parks, especially in park-poor areas of the City of Los Angeles.

=== Complete Streets ===
Huizar advocated for the complete streets model of city planning, where streets are safe for pedestrians, bicyclists, motorists, and public transportation users. In 2012, Huizar and then-Councilmember Jan Perry wrote a City Council motion that created a parklet program for the City of Los Angeles. According to the motion, parklets would encourage "pedestrian and ground-floor activity [and provide] much-needed open space." In 2013, the city's first parklets were installed in the Highland Park, El Sereno, and Downtown Los Angeles. Huizar also worked to grow bike infrastructure in the City of Los Angeles, including a green bike lane Downtown. The Los Angeles County Bicycle Coalition recognized Huizar in late 2013 for his complete streets efforts and forging a compromise to ensure Downtown's Spring Streets bicycle lanes remained in place. In 2010 and 2011, Huizar worked to install the city's first bike corral on York Boulevard in Highland Park.

=== Transportation ===
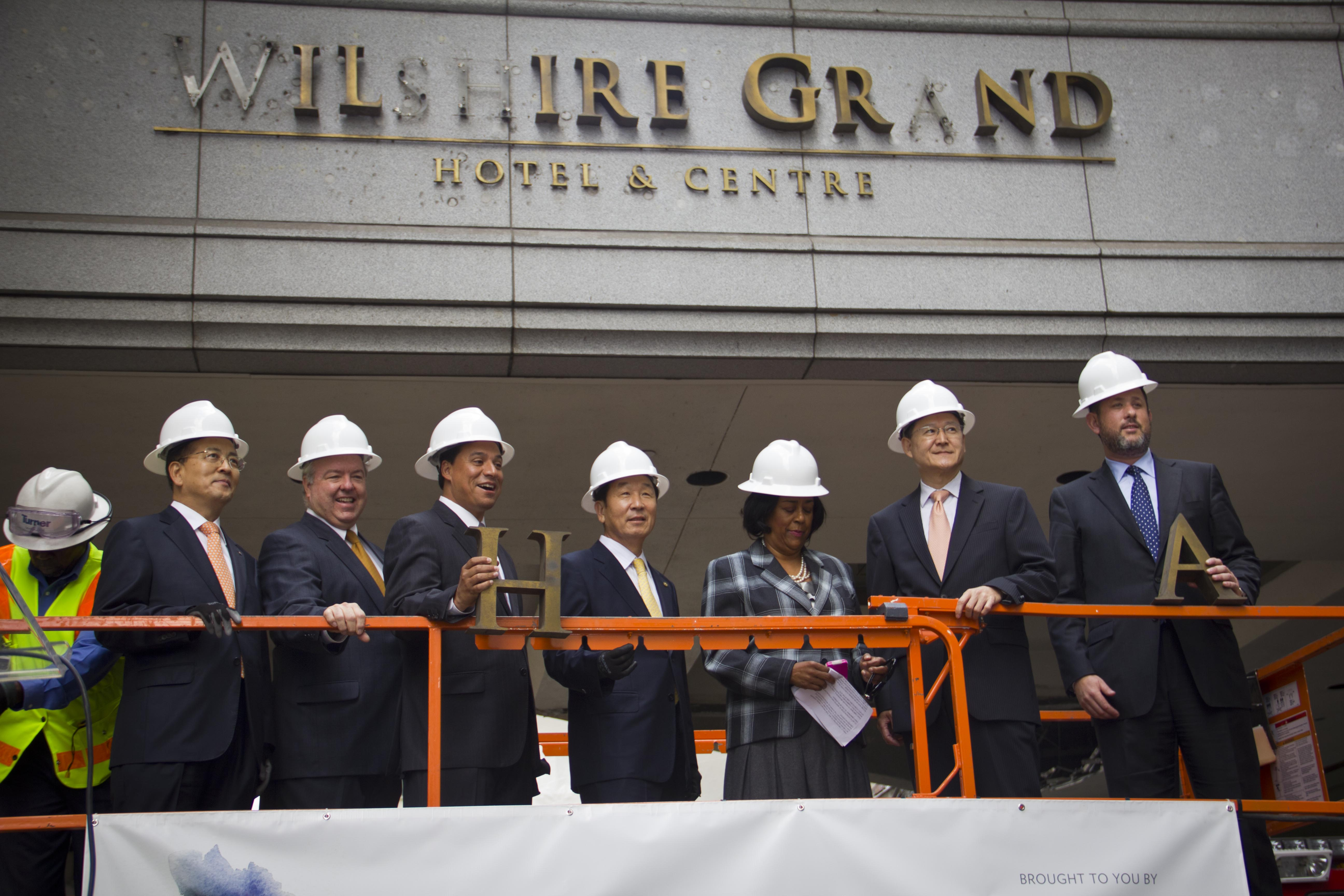
Huizar, holding the "H", at the commencement of the demolition and redevelopment of the Wilshire Grand Hotel in 2012

In 2009 Huizar was appointed to the Los Angeles County Metropolitan Transportation Authority Board of Directors. While on the board, he pushed for extended Metro hours, and greater attention to civil rights in transportation planning. He served on the board until 2013.

=== Housing ===
Huizar blocked and delayed the construction of 49 affordable housing units in his neighborhood for several years.

=== Historic preservation ===
In 2011 Huizar authored a motion to help extend the Mills Act, which incentivizes historic preservation by offering lower property taxes to those restoring historic structures. Also in 2010, Huizar also helped expand the Highland Park Historic Preservation Overlay Zone. Historic preservation is also a key aspect of the Bringing Back Broadway initiative. Huizar was criticized for land-use decisions that resulted in the loss of such historic landmarks as the Ambassador Hotel, Parker Center, Sixth Street Bridge and Lytton Savings.

In 2008 Huizar created the Bringing Back Broadway initiative, a ten-year plan to revitalize the historic Broadway Theater District in Downtown Los Angeles. Huizar campaigned to bring back the Historic Downtown Los Angeles Streetcar.

== Bribery allegations, indictment ==
The FBI opened up a case at City Hall after reports of retaliation by a council member. Fundraiser and former city planning commissioner Justin Jangwoo Kim has pleaded guilty to federal charges of coordinating large cash bribes to a LA City Council member. One of these was former council member Mitch Englander, who has pleaded guilty to accepting bribes from Kim. In a separate case, the US Attorney's office has filed charges against a real estate developer described in public legal papers only as Developer C, accusing the developer of giving $500,000 to an unnamed person. According to an analysis by the L.A. Times, details in the suit make it clear that C is Kim and that the alleged recipient of the bribe was Huizar.

Huizar's former aide, George Esparza pleaded guilty in the investigation. He facilitated bribes from Chinese real estate developers to a council member, known to be Huizar. Specifically Developer C, now known to be Shenzhen New World Group, totaling over one million dollars associated with the planned redevelopment of The L.A. Grand Hotel Downtown. On June 23, 2020, Huizar was arrested and taken into federal custody at his Boyle Heights home on racketeering charges. If convicted, he faced up to 20 years in prison. On January 20, 2023, Huizar pleaded guilty to racketeering and tax evasion, as he used Los Angeles's discretionary permit system to extort at least $1.5 million from real estate developers. On January 26, 2024, he was sentenced to 13 years in federal prison. On October 7, 2024 he reported to prison to begin his prison sentence at Federal Correctional Institute Lompoc II under register number 79518-112.

== Lawsuits ==
=== Misconduct allegations ===
Former staffers Mayra Álvarez, Francine Godoy, and Jesse Leon have sued Huizar, claiming that he retaliated against them when they spoke up about conduct by Huizar that they considered unethical or illegal. Álvarez's suit says she was fired for "voicing discomfort with some of his and the office's practices which she believed violated local, state, and federal law." Godoy claims that she was forced to resign because "she complained about using city funds to pay for Huízar's personal expenses, and accused him of giving preferential treatment to another staffer with whom he was having an extramarital affair." Leon's suit says he was fired after he went to the FBI with information about pay-to-play schemes involving cannabis business licenses, but Huizar says that Leon himself had a conflict of interest involving his own attempts to get such a license.

=== Sexual harassment lawsuit ===
On October 17, 2013, Huizar was sued for sexual harassment, and he subsequently confessed that he had engaged in a "consensual relationship" with a former female staffer, Francine Godoy. Huizar reportedly reduced her duties in response to her refusal to grant him sexual favors. In addition, during her campaign for a seat on the Los Angeles Community College District Board, Huizar promised to support her campaign in exchange that she give in to his advances.

A City of Los Angeles investigation overseen by an independent panel of retired judges and other law experts found no evidence supporting Godoy's harassment claims. The lawsuit was dropped against Huizar and the City of Los Angeles in September 2014. With the lawsuit being dropped, the City of Los Angeles paid no money to Godoy.

== Awards ==
In 2005 Hispanic Business Magazine named him one of the "100 most influential Hispanics" in the United States. Huizar was also named by the Los Angeles Business Journal as one of the 25 figures in the Los Angeles area that "stand out for their potential to shape lives." In 2013, Huizar received the Los Angeles League of Conservation Voters Environmental Champion Award and the Sierra Club's Political Leadership award.

== Personal life ==
Huizar married Richelle Ríos in 1999, and the couple has four children. Huizar became a U.S. citizen while in college.

Political offices
| Preceded by Antonio Villaraigosa | Los Angeles City Councilmember, 14th district 2005–2020 | Succeeded by |
