= Edward L. Thrasher =

American politician (1892–1971)

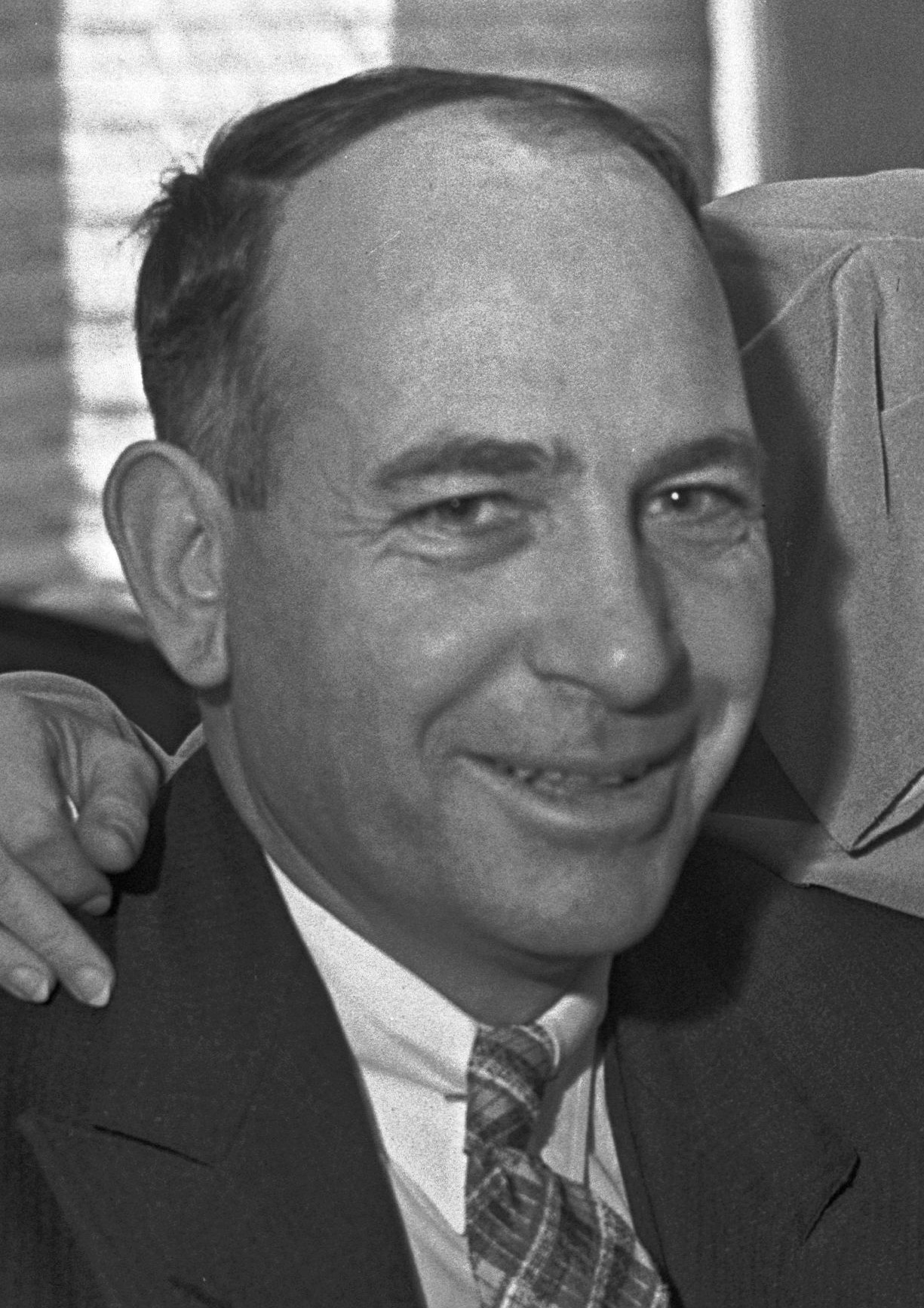
- Thrasher in 1935

Member of the Los Angeles City Council for the 14th district
- In office July 1, 1931 – June 30, 1943
- Preceded by: Charles A. Holland
- Succeeded by: John C. Holland

Personal details
- Born: June 5, 1892 Girard, Kansas
- Died: March 5, 1971 (aged 78) Highland Park, Los Angeles
- Political party: Democratic

Edward Lee Thrasher (June 5, 1892 – March 5, 1971) was a builder, contractor and decorator who served on the Los Angeles, California, City Council between 1931 and 1942.

== Biography ==
Thrasher was born June 5, 1892, in Great Falls, Montana, the son of Schuyler E. Thrasher and Lena Reiman, both of Michigan. He had two brothers, Sydney J. and William R. After graduating from Loup City High School in Nebraska, he engaged in painting, decorating and contracting until 1917, when he went to Europe with the American Expeditionary Forces, where he was a signal electrician and was gassed in the Battle of Saint-Mihiel, France. After the war, he was in the railroad business for two years, then studied civil engineering at the University of Wyoming and design and decorating at the Southern Branch of the University of California (UCLA) in 1921. He completed this study at the Otis Art Institute in 1923-24. Afterward, he spent a short time in real estate and insurance, then went into building and contracting. In 1935 he told an interviewer his hobby was football.

He was married to Anna Louise Edwards on January 21, 1920 in Trinidad, Colorado. They had three children, Phyllis Elaine (later Wammack), Marilyn Louise (later Hall) and Edward Lee Jr. He was a Mason, Odd Fellow and an active member of the American Legion. He died in March 5, 1971 and was interred at Forest Lawn Memorial Park.

== City Council ==
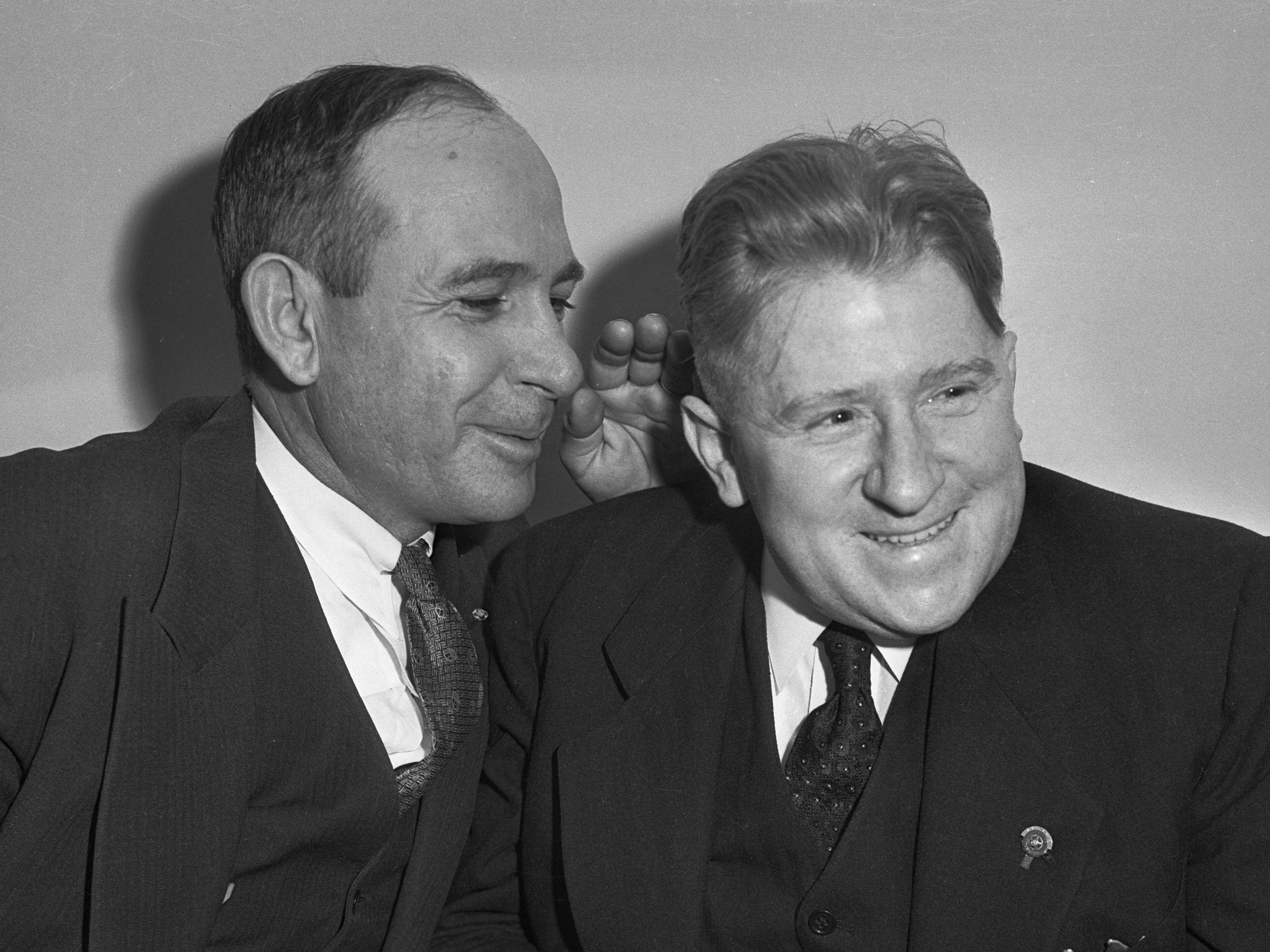
Thrasher whispering to fellow councilman E. Snapper Ingram's ear, 1930s.

=== Elections ===
Thrasher's "entry into politics was brought about when he was called in to assist in revising the city's building code." Thrasher, who was living at 3150 Weldon Avenue, Glassell Park, ran for the 14th District seat on the Los Angeles City Council in 1929 but lost in the primary. He was successful in the 1931 election, however, in beating the incumbent, Charles A. Holland, as part of an anti-Mayor John C. Porter movement, and was reelected five times, through 1941; he lost in the 1943 election to John C. Holland. In the 1935 election he was known as the anti-End Poverty in California candidate.

=== Controversies ===
1931 Thrasher visited Myron Penn, the asserted victim of a beating in the city jail, in Penn's hospital room and then demanded an immediate investigation by the Police Commission into the situation. Both the commission and a grand jury later looked into the case.

1931 Thrasher was one of the six council members who in July 1931 lost a vote to appeal a judge's decision ordering an end to racial restrictions in city-operated swimming pools. The pools had previously been restricted by race to certain days or hours. An appeal would have delayed or ended desegregation.

1932 Mayor John C. Porter vetoed a City Council ordinance that granted a 10-foot strip of city property to the owner of a home that Thrasher was renting — "a gift promoted by Councilman Thrasher without disclosing his own interest in the matter," according to a Los Angeles Times opinion piece.

1936 Though he said he "held very little hope for any action," Thrasher submitted to the council lengthy lists of names and addresses of asserted "houses of ill repute" and "gambling joints" he had received from "persons who apparently did not want to sign their names." The previous week, "Thrasher and others in the Council created an uproar with their charges that gambling is going on in the city and that vice is rampant." The list was forwarded to the Police Commission.

1939 Thrasher was said to be on a "purge list" of Mayor Fletcher Bowron after the mayor said in a radio address that Thrasher must be defeated in the next election because he was "a part of the old machine." A Los Angeles Times columnist, writing under the name of "The Watchman," responded:

Thrasher is somewhat obstinate, and too much of an individualist to incorporate himself into any political machine, which explains why he is usually at outs with the "corner pocket." He feels very strongly that there are too many commissions and departments crowding each other in City Hall. He frequently starts a movement to thin out these weeds in the city garden, which explains why Mayors do not like him.

1940 Concerned that questions being asked on civil service examinations were "too technical" and not "practical in character," Thrasher submitted a motion asking the Civil Service Commission for a copy of the questions posed in recent tests. When Council President Robert L. Burns ruled the motion out of order, an uproar ensued, and Councilman Arthur E. Briggs's appeal from the ruling of the chair was upheld by the Council, but only by a narrow 8–7 vote.

1940 Thrasher proposed a 1-cent-per-package retail license tax on cigarettes to help replenish a depleted reserve fund. Troy Chenoweth, head of the city's license division, estimated the tax would bring in $400,00 a year, "proportionally higher than in other cities because of the large number of women smokers" in Los Angeles.

1940–41 In October 1940, the councilman attempted to control the content of radio broadcasts over station KRKD from the City Hall when he submitted a motion "to make the talks strictly noncontroversial and if a speaker strays from that path, to shut him off the air." Six months later, in April 1941, the Council unanimously adopted his motion to set the council on record "as being opposed to any radio broadcast, publication or spoken word, which in any way may be interpreted as being subversive in character or lending itself to anti-American or undemocratic principles of government." Copies of the resolution were ordered sent to all Los Angeles radio stations and to the Federal Communications Commission.

Preceded by Charles A. Holland	Los Angeles City Council; 14th District; 1931–43	Succeeded by John C. Holland
