= Leland M. Ford =

American politician

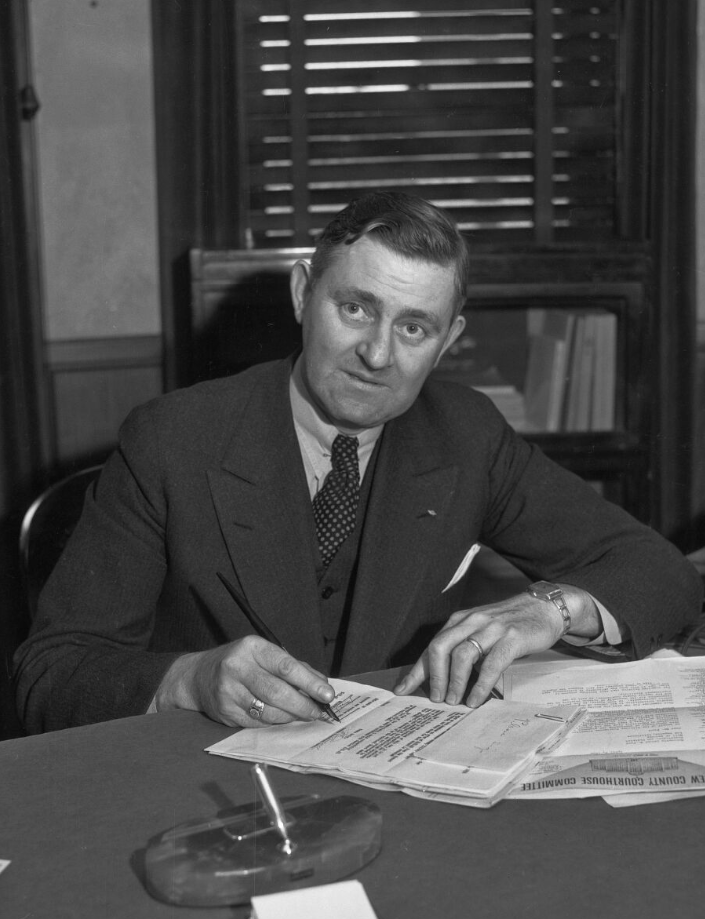
- Leland M. Ford sits at his desk after being sworn is as a L.A. County Supervisor.

Member of the U.S. House of Representatives from California's 16th district
- In office January 3, 1939 – January 3, 1943
- Preceded by: John F. Dockweiler
- Succeeded by: Will Rogers Jr.

Chair of Los Angeles County
- In office December 8, 1936 – December 6, 1938
- Preceded by: Roger W. Jessup
- Succeeded by: Roger W. Jessup

Member of the Los Angeles County Board of Supervisors from the 4th district
- In office 1936–1938
- Preceded by: John R. Quinn
- Succeeded by: Oscar L. Hauge

Personal details
- Born: Leland Merritt Ford; March 8, 1893 Eureka, Nevada, U.S.
- Died: November 27, 1965 (aged 72) Santa Monica, California, U.S.
- Resting place: Woodlawn Memorial Cemetery, Santa Monica
- Party: Republican

Leland Merritt Ford (March 8, 1893 – November 27, 1965) was an American businessman and politician who served two terms as a U.S. representative from California from 1939 to 1943.

== Early life and career ==
Born in Eureka, Nevada, Ford attended the public schools. He also took various courses at the University of Arizona at Tucson, Virginia Polytechnic Institute at Blacksburg, Sheldon Science of Business, Chicago, Illinois, and the University of California, Los Angeles. He was a surveyor for Southern Sierras Power Co. in 1909 and 1910. Afterward that, he was an employee of the Southern Pacific Railroad in California in 1911 and in New York in 1912 and 1913. He moved to Los Angeles, California, in 1915 and was employed by the Union Pacific Railroad. He then moved to Lynchburg, Virginia, and engaged in farming and livestock breeding from 1915 to 1919. In 1919, he moved to Santa Monica, California and engaged in the real estate business. He served as a member of the planning commission of Santa Monica, California from 1923 to 1927. Later, he was a county supervisor of Los Angeles County, California from 1936 to 1939.

== Congress ==
Ford was elected as a Republican to the Seventy-sixth and Seventy-seventh Congresses (January 3, 1939 – January 3, 1943). He was the first congressman to lobby for the mass incarceration of Japanese Americans after the attack on Pearl Harbor brought the U.S. into World War II, and spearheaded the anti-Japanese campaign in California. (Ford initially defended Japanese Americans when Representative John Rankin proposed deporting every "Jap" in the country, but reversed his position after receiving angry letters and telegrams from constituents.)

He was an unsuccessful candidate for reelection in 1942 to the Seventy-eighth Congress.

== Later career and death ==
He then resumed his real estate business. He was a resident of Pacific Palisades, California. He died in Santa Monica, California, November 27, 1965 and was interred in Woodlawn Cemetery.

== Electoral history ==
United States House of Representatives elections, 1938
Party	Candidate	Votes	%
Republican	Leland M. Ford	97,407	62.8
Democratic	John F. Dockweiler (write-in)	32,863	21.2
Townsend	Ted E. Felt	16,045	10.3
Progressive Party (United States, 1924)	J. Barton Huthins	6,643	4.3
Communist	La Rue McCormick	2,070	1.3
Total votes		155,028	100.0
Turnout			
Republican gain from Democratic			

United States House of Representatives elections, 1940
Party	Candidate	Votes	%
Republican	Leland M. Ford	188,049	96.4
Communist	George C. Sandy	7,017	3.6
Total votes		195,066	100.0
Turnout			
Republican gain from Democratic			

United States House of Representatives elections, 1942
Party	Candidate	Votes	%
Democratic	Will Rogers Jr.	61,437	53.7
Republican	Leland M. Ford (incumbent)	52,023	45.4
Communist	Allen L. Ryan	1,043	0.9
Total votes		114,503	100.0
Turnout			
Democratic gain from Republican			

U.S. House of Representatives
Preceded by John F. Dockweiler	Member of the U.S. House of Representatives from California's 16th congressional district 1939–1943	Succeeded by Will Rogers, Jr.
Political offices
Preceded by Roger W. Jessup	Chair of Los Angeles County; 1936—1938	Succeeded by Roger W. Jessup
Preceded by John R. Quinn	Los Angeles County Board of Supervisors; 4th district 1936—1938	Succeeded by Oscar Hauge
