= John C. Holland =

American politician

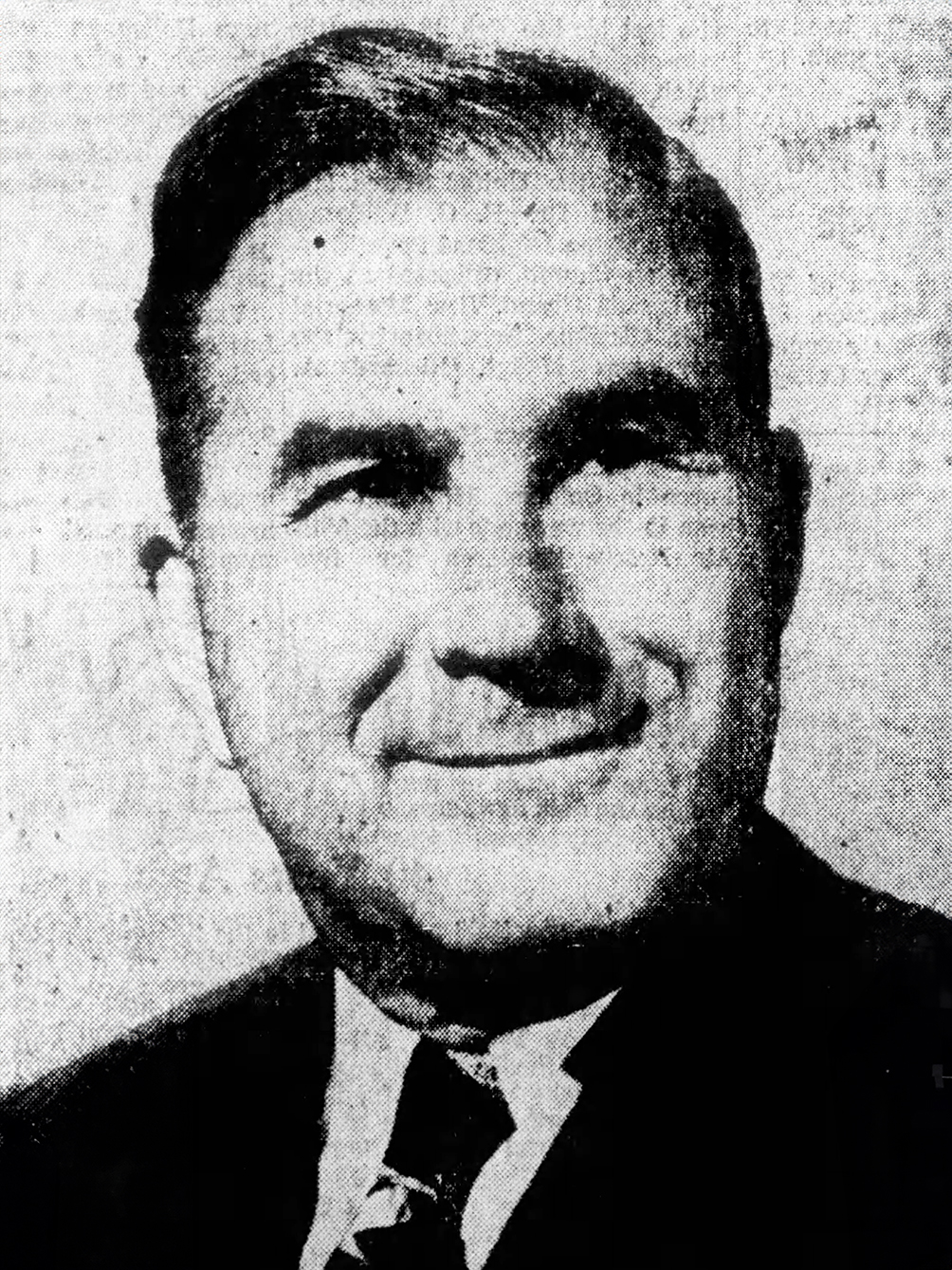
- Holland in 1953

Member of the Los Angeles City Council for the 14th district
- In office July 1, 1943 – June 30, 1967
- Preceded by: Edward L. Thrasher
- Succeeded by: Arthur K. Snyder

Personal details
- Born: June 6, 1893 Bartlett, Texas
- Died: March 10, 1970 (aged 76) Los Angeles, California
- Political party: Republican
- Spouse: Alice Colby Wells (m. 1919)
- Children: 2

John C. Holland (July 6, 1893 – March 10, 1970) was one of the longest-serving Los Angeles City Council members, for 24 years from 1943 to 1967, and was known for his losing fight against bringing the Los Angeles Dodgers to Chavez Ravine and for his reputation as a watchdog over the city treasury.

== Biography ==
Holland was born July 6, 1893, in Bartlett, Texas, the son of William Philip Holland of Fluvanna County, Virginia, and Betty Connell Holland of Liberty Hill, Texas. He was married to Alice Colby Wells of Redlands, California, on June 30, 1919. They had two daughters, Mary Elizabeth Neeb and Helen Louise Osterberg.

Holland attended high school in Roswell, New Mexico, and spent one year at the University of Texas. He then attended Stanford University, where he was active in debating and was on the wrestling team. He graduated in 1917 with a prelaw degree and then went into the Army.

In 1919 he opened an electric-supply business in the northeast Los Angeles community of Highland Park, which he operated until December 1951.

A Republican, he was a member of the American Legion, the Freemasons, the Kiwanis Club and Delta Sigma Rho fraternity. He served two terms as president of the Highland Park chamber of commerce and was active in the northeast YMCA.

Holland died at the age of 76 on March 10, 1970, at Broadview Christian Science Sanitorium, in the Montecito Heights neighborhood of Los Angeles after an illness of several weeks. He was buried in Forest Lawn Memorial Park.

== Public service ==
=== Elections ===
Holland took part in the successful 1938 reform bid of Superior Court Judge Fletcher Bowron to unseat Mayor Frank Shaw. In 1942 Bowron appointed him to the city Fire Commission, a post that he resigned in 1943 to campaign for the seat in Los Angeles City Council District 14 against the incumbent, Edward L. Thrasher. He was elected in the primary, a feat that he accomplished in every one of his elections thereafter until he retired in 1967. He set a record for longevity on the council, a feat that was tied in 1969 by L.E. Timberlake.

=== Positions ===
Finances. Holland became chairman of the council's finance committee early in his career, and he became known as the "watchdog of the city treasury." He was parsimonious in running his office, too, making do with just one field deputy, Art Snyder, when other members employed three assistants.

Public housing, 1952. He was opposed to a massive U.S-government subsidized public housing proposal that, he said, was "inexcusably expensive and wasteful of tax monies." He objected to the building of thirty-four 13-story buildings throughout the city, including on "virgin land" in West Los Angeles, Rose Hills and Tujunga. The proposal was abandoned.

Dodgers, 1957–59 The councilman believed that exchanging the 300 acres of city land in Chavez Ravine for "a 10-acre unused" former baseball stadium, Wrigley Field, was "not in the best interests of the city. "It was the biggest steal of public lands and money since the trade for Manhattan Island with the Indians for a basket of beads," he said.

It was common for him to make three or four speeches an evening to any group which would listen to his side of the Chavez Ravine issue, and then appear early the next morning for a breakfast meeting and another speech before participating in a stormy council session starting at 10 a.m.

Zoo, 1961. Holland opposed turning over the Los Angeles Zoo in Griffith Park to a private organization.

Fluoridation, 1961. Holland's birth in Bartlett, Texas, was a talking point during a campaign over adding fluorides to the city's water, which he opposed as a Christian Scientist. His obituary in the local community newspaper, the Highland Park Herald & Journal, ended with:

Holland said it was his experience that fluoridated water was unhealthy, and he said he could prove this because the town of Bartlett taxed the residents in order to take the fluorides out.

Slang, 1963. He seconded and voted in favor of a motion ordering a city study to see if the controversial Dictionary of American Slang violated state obscenity laws.

Preceded by Edward L. Thrasher	Los Angeles City Council; 14th District; 1943–67	Succeeded by Arthur K. Snyder
