= Charles A. Holland =

American sportsperson and politician

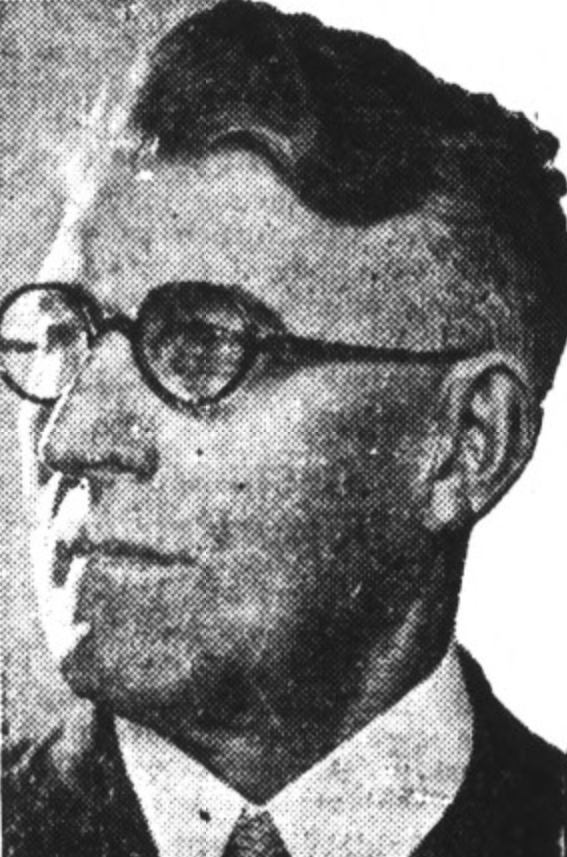
- Holland in 1929

Member of the Los Angeles City Council for the 14th district
- In office July 1, 1929 – June 30, 1931
- Preceded by: William G. Bonelli
- Succeeded by: Edward L. Thrasher

Personal details
- Born: 1872 Girard, Kansas
- Died: July 11, 1940 (aged 67–68) Highland Park, Los Angeles
- Party: Democratic
Charles A. Holland
University of Southern California
- Position: Center
Personal information
- Listed height: 5 ft 11 in (1.80 m)
- Listed weight: 175 lb (79 kg)

Charles Alfred Holland (1872–1940) was a University of Southern California football captain, a businessman and a Los Angeles, California, City Council member between 1929 and 1931.

== Biography ==
Holland was born in 1872 in Girard, Kansas, the son of Ira A. Holland of Kentucky and Ursula Crowder of Tennessee. The death of his parents left him an orphan at the age of thirteen; he earned his own livelihood early on and put himself through the Academy and Park College in Parkville, Missouri.

He came to California in 1894 and enrolled at the University of Southern California to study electrical engineering. Five years later, he was elected captain of the football team in his junior (third) year, and his age was given as twenty-four, although he was actually about twenty-seven. He was 5 feet, 11 inches tall and weighed 175 pounds. He played center. He was secretary of the Athanasian Literary Society at the school and was a member of Beta Kappa Upsilon fraternity. Holland graduated in 1901, and in September 1902, listing his age as thirty, he and Cora E. Spring, age twenty-six, were issued a marriage license.

By 1910, Holland was a "dealer in gas and electrical supplies and fixtures," for on July 1 of that year he took possession of the leased store and basement at 756 South Hill Street from the Jesse H. Taylor Company. He later moved his business to North Broadway and also engaged in the real-estate and insurance business. He was in the Masons and the Shriners. In 1928 he was the president of the Northeast Optimist Club.

Holland died of a heart attack on July 11, 1940, in his home at 126 North Avenue 54, Highland Park, leaving his wife, Cora, and two sons, Wendell and Kenneth, and a sister, Mattie Gooding. Burial was in Forest Lawn Memorial Park, Glendale.

== Public service ==
=== Planning Commission ===
Holland was a member of the city's first planning commission in 1920, which at that time was composed of 51 members appointed by the City Council "to work out an organized, comprehensive plan of city development." Other notable members were Eugene Biscailuz, C.J. Colden, Evan Lewis and W.H. Workman Jr.

=== City Council ===
During his City Council term, he was known as the city's Lighting and Traffic Commissioner.

In January 1930, Holland and seven other council members who had voted in favor of granting a rock-crushing permit in the Santa Monica Mountains were unsuccessfully targeted for recall on the grounds that the eight had

conspired with . . . Alphonzo Bell, Samuel Traylor and Chapin A. Day, all multi-millionaires, to grant this group a special spot zoning permit to crush and ship . . . from the high-class residential section of Santa Monica, limestone and rock for cement.

That recall effort did not get off the ground, but Holland was targeted later the same year in another ouster movement based on "his attitude in the acquisition of Victory Park, No. 2,' and also of "not adhering to campaign pledges." Up to a thousand protestors were incensed at the action of the City Council in condemning what the objectors called a "long, narrow strip" in the Arroyo Seco for a park project that was to be combined with a motor roadway between Los Angeles and Pasadena, today's Arroyo Seco Parkway. The recall failed, by a vote of 4,462 in favor and 7,409 opposed.

Holland ran for reelection in 1931 but lost to Edward L. Thrasher.

=== Grand jury ===
Holland was a member of a 1939 federal grand jury appointed to probe the asserted monopolistic practices of nearly 100 Pacific Coast oil companies.

Preceded by William G. Bonelli	Los Angeles City Council; 14th District; 1929–31	Succeeded by Edward L. Thrasher
