= The L.A. Grand Hotel Downtown =

Proposed super tall tower in Los Angeles, California

- Location within the Los Angeles metropolitan area

General information
- Type: Hotel
- Location: 333 S. Figueroa St. Los Angeles, California
- Coordinates: 34.0500°N 118.2593°W
- Completed: 1983
- Owner: Shenzhen New World Group

Technical details
- Floor count: 14

The L.A. Grand Hotel Downtown is a vacant hotel in the Bunker Hill neighborhood of Los Angeles, California, one block west of the Grand Avenue Arts/Bunker Hill Metro Rail station.

== History ==
=== Early years ===
The 469-room, 14-story hotel opened as The Sheraton Grande in 1983, to accommodate visitors attending the 1984 Summer Olympics. In December 1997, it was sold to CapStar for $54.5 million. The new owners switched the hotel to Marriott operation, and it became the Marriott Los Angeles Downtown in 1998. In March 2007, Blackstone Inc. sold the hotel to Namco Capital Group for $115 million. The hotel went bankrupt after the 2008 financial crisis and was purchased in foreclosure by Shenzhen New World Group in 2010 for $90 million. In August of 2012, the hotel dropped the Marriott name and became independently operated, as The L.A. Grand Hotel Downtown . In January 2013, Shenzhen New World announced plans for the hotel to join Hyatt in May 2013 as the Hyatt Regency Los Angeles Downtown. The name change never happened.

=== Redevelopment corruption scandal ===
In 2018, Shenzhen New World announced plans to redevelop the eastern half of the property. They intended to demolish the hotel's ballroom wing and build a 77-story tower, 333 South Figueroa, adjacent to the existing 13-story tower, which was to be converted to apartments. The tower would have been the 16th tallest building in the United States, the tallest building west of the Mississippi River, the tallest in California, and the tallest in Los Angeles, at a proposed height of 1,108 feet, surpassing the height of the Wilshire Grand Center. The tower would have contained 242 condominiums, 559 hotel rooms, and 28,700 square feet of retail along Figueroa Street. The development was placed on hold in 2019, due to corruption allegations between the developer and city council member Jose Huizar. The US Attorney's office filed charges described in public legal papers, accusing the developer of giving $500,000 to an unnamed person. Huizar pled guilty to corruption charges in 2023 and was sent to prison in 2024 for 13 years. Shenzhen New World was fined $4 million in 2024 by a Los Angeles court for bribing Huizar.

=== Closure ===
The L.A. Grand Hotel Downtown ceased operations in early 2020, due to the COVID-19 pandemic. In 2021, the empty hotel was converted by the Los Angeles Homeless Services Authority to a homeless shelter through Project Roomkey. In 2022, the Academy of Media Arts moved into the first three floors of the hotel. In 2024, the high school filed suit against the City of LA and the hotel, claiming the continued operation of the hotel as a homeless shelter through the city's Inside Safe program, beyond its originally promised closure date, had made operation of the school untenable.
