= Arthur K. Snyder =

American lawyer and politician

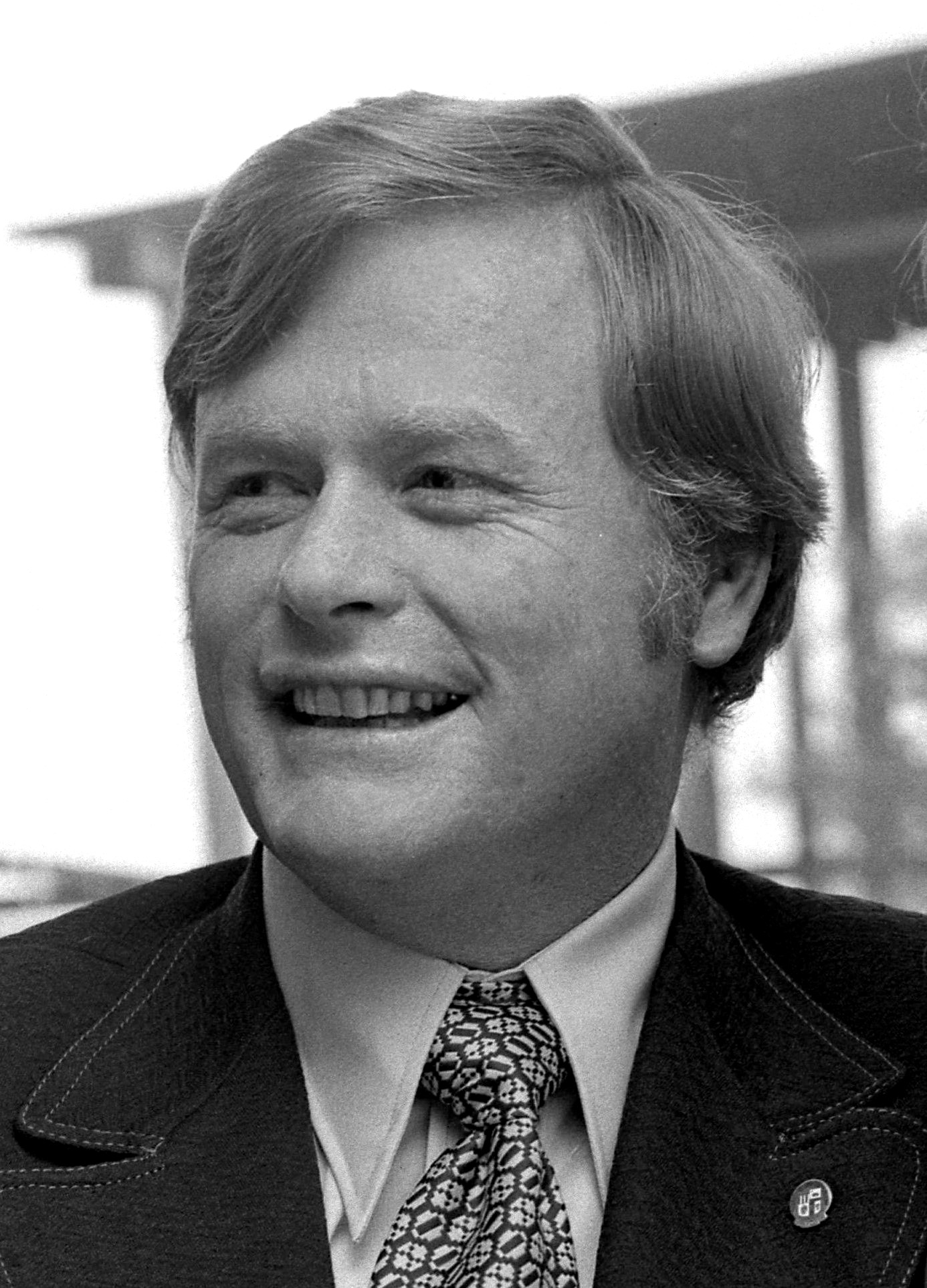
- Snyder in 1973

Member of the Los Angeles City Council from the 14th district
- In office July 1, 1967 – October 4, 1985
- Preceded by: John C. Holland
- Succeeded by: Richard Alatorre

Personal details
- Born: November 10, 1932 Los Angeles, California
- Died: November 7, 2012 (aged 79) Huntington Beach, California, United States
- Spouses: Mary Frances Neely (m. 1953, divorced) Michele Maggie Noval (m. 1973, divorced) Delia Wu (m. 1981)
- Children: 3
- Education: B.A. George Pepperdine College 1953; J.D. University of Southern California 1958; LL.D. Union University 1980
- Occupation: Lawyer; politician; restaurateur

Arthur Kress Snyder (November 10, 1932 – November 7, 2012) was an American lawyer, politician, and restaurateur. He served on the Los Angeles, California, City Council between 1967 and 1985 and later engaged in a private law practice.

== Biography ==
Snyder was born in the Lincoln Heights area of Los Angeles on November 10, 1932, and went to school in Los Angeles. He was a graduate of Los Angeles City College, with a major in speech, and of Pepperdine College, where he earned a bachelor of arts in political science. He "Worked his way through college as hod carrier, ditch digger, brick factory worker, sawmill worker, recreation director and private investigator." He earned a Juris Doctor degree at the University of Southern California while at the same time doing public relations work for the American Institute of Architects.

A Baptist, he was married on March 5, 1954, to his first wife, Mary Frances Neely, a teacher who was active in Highland Park and Eagle Rock civic affairs. They had two children, Neely Arthur, born 1960, and Miles John, born 1963. He was later married to Michele Noval, "who fought the councilman in a bitter divorce and child custody case."

Snyder was a captain in the U.S Marines between 1952 and 1955, when he was a legal officer. He was a licensed real estate broker from 1959 to 1967 and was field deputy for City Councilman John C. Holland before being elected himself. He was a director of the Southside Chamber of Commerce in 1957–58 and of the United Northeast Economic Development Association in 1966–68. He was president of the Small Property Owners' League of Los Angeles County in 1957–59. He was active in the American Legion.

He opened a law firm specializing in immigration, international trade and personal injury in 1982.

== City Council ==
Snyder, field deputy for longtime Councilman John C. Holland, was elected in 1967 to represent Los Angeles City Council District 14 as the successor to Holland, who retired. In that era (1971) the district began "in the East Los Angeles Mexican-American barrios of El Sereno and Lincoln Heights extends westward across the Pasadena Freeway to Anglo middle-class homes in Glassell Park, Highland Park and Eagle Rock through Griffith Park. Around the western edge of the district is the Los Feliz District, with some of the city's more expensive homes."

He was reelected in 1971 and 1975 and had no opposition in 1981. In 1984, however, he faced a recall election based partially on the fact that the district had shifted toward being heavily Hispanic in population but also because Snyder had suffered through a string of "political disasters." He was called "a grating symbol to those seeking to elect a Latino to the City Council for the first time in more than 20 years." It was said that he won because of a huge absentee ballot campaign and high turnout in Anglo areas; but he did carry Hispanic Lincoln Heights.

Snyder resigned in a "dramatic fashion" from the City Council in January 1985, but the resignation was not to take effect until July 1. In a press conference that included his current wife, Delia, 34, Snyder said that she was expecting a child in August and "it is my conclusion that on the advice of her doctor that she deserves a more peaceful and productive life than I have been able to give her in the past two years."

== Post-council ==
Snyder later became a lobbyist.

Snyder was convicted (1996) of campaign finance violations, and his license to practice law was suspended (2001) for six months.

In 2008, Snyder was a semi retired lawyer and real estate investor with holdings in Las Vegas and Texas. He maintained his Eagle Rock home as a Law office, serving friends and former clients part-time. In 2007, his firm Marisol, LLC, owned the name Don the Beachcomber restaurants.

== Controversies ==
- Driving record. Snyder's driving record was called into question when it was reported that he had seven minor traffic accidents while driving city automobiles between 1972 and 1980, His first trial on a misdemeanor drunk driving charge ended in a hung jury in October 1980. The District Attorney's office refiled and he was allowed to plead guilty to a reduced charge of reckless driving.
- Campaign finances. The councilman was accused by auditors of the California Franchise Tax Board of "personally receiving more than $12,000 in interest from his campaign war chest in 1979 without publicly disclosing it."
- Via Marisol. In 1978 Snyder "renamed venerable Hermon Avenue [in Hermon] 'Via Marisol' for his 3-year-old daughter, Erin-Marisol ... Locals were outraged. But there were only about 2,500 of them at the time and their tiny number didn't carry much weight at City Hall."
- Criminal investigation. Snyder was investigated in 1985 by authorities for alleged molestation of his young daughter, and a judge concluded that the evidence "substantiated allegations of abuse by both parents, including several molestations by Snyder." The daughter was unwilling to testify in her father’s presence, and the district attorney's office decided not to prosecute.

Preceded by John C. Holland	Los Angeles City Council; 14th District; 1967–85	Succeeded by Richard Alatorre
