= Frank J. Rogers =

American politician

Member of the California State Assembly from the 54th district
- In office January 2, 1933 - January 7, 1935
- Preceded by: William G. Bonelli
- Succeeded by: Wilbur F. Gilbert

Personal details
- Born: March 16, 1886 Creston, Iowa
- Died: September 26, 1978 (aged 92)
- Party: Democratic
- Spouse: Anna Lee Cutting (m. 1922, div. 1930s)

Military service
- Branch/service: United States Army
- Battles/wars: World War I

Frank J. Rogers (March 16, 1886 - September 26, 1978) served in the California State Assembly for the 54th district from 1933 to 1935 and during World War I he served in the United States Army.
