= John R. Quinn (politician) =

National Commander of the American Legion from 1923 to 1924

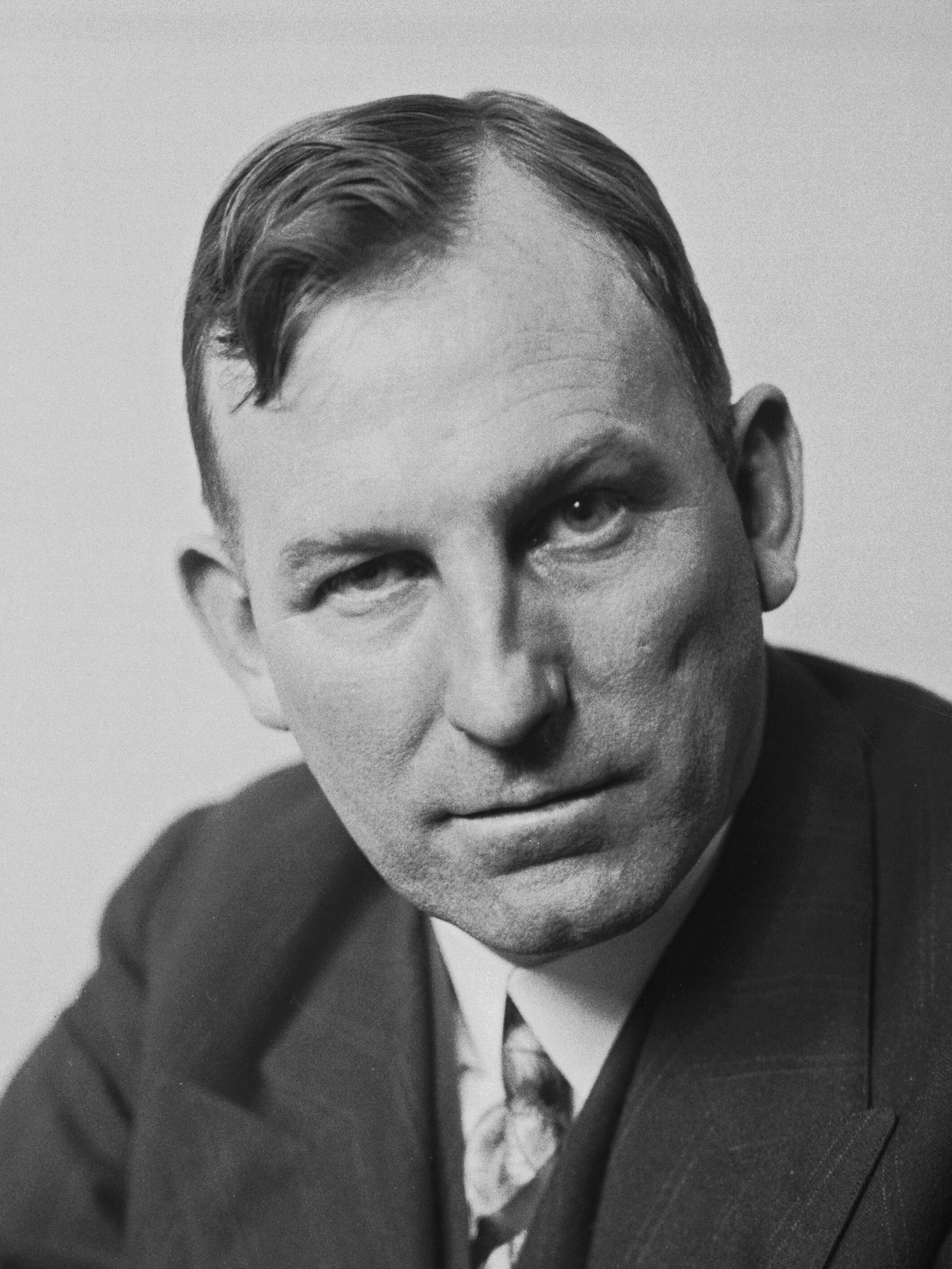

Member of the Los Angeles County Board of Supervisors from the 4th district
- In office 1930–1936
- Preceded by: Reuben F. McClellan
- Succeeded by: Leland M. Ford

6th National Commander of The American Legion
- In office 1923–1924
- Preceded by: Alvin M. Owsley
- Succeeded by: James A. Drain

Personal details
- Born: John Robertson Quinn; July 17, 1889 Porterville, California, U.S.
- Died: April 29, 1979 (aged 89) Los Angeles County, California, U.S.
- Party: Republican
- Education: University of California, Berkeley (BS)
- Nickname: "Square Shooter"

Military service
- Service: United States Army
- Years of service: 1917–1919
- Rank: Major
- Commands: Battery F, 348th Field Artillery Regiment, 91st Division
- Battles: World War I; Meuse–Argonne; Defensive Sector
- Awards: World War I Victory Medal

John Robertson Quinn (July 17, 1889 – April 29, 1979) was an American politician who served as the sixth national commander of the American Legion from 1923 to 1924. He also served on the Los Angeles County Board of Supervisors from 1930 until 1936 and as Los Angeles County Assessor from 1938 to 1962.

== Biography ==
John Robertson Quinn was born in Porterville, California, where he grew up and attended local schools. He was a member of The American Legion who served as the sixth national commander from 1923 to 1924. A successful rancher, Quinn was an active participant in the business community in Tulare. In May 1922, Quinn was listed among 20 local politicians and businessmen as a purported member of the Ku Klux Klan. In response, Quinn issued the following statement:

During the summer of 1921, I was invited to become a member of the Ku Klux Klan. The organization was at that time openly soliciting members and represented the purpose of the order to be the furtherment of law and order and the development of 100 per cent Americanism. Devoted as I was to the promotion of the ideals of Americanism as taught by the American Legion I was more than willing to aid any organization actuated by such motives. I was asked to aid and did attend a meeting in a public hall in the city of Bakersfield and signed a card, but did not perfect membership. This card, I presume, is the foundation for the assumption that I am a member of the Ku Klux Klan. Since that time I have attended no meetings of the organization. have never discussed its business with any of its members and have paid no dues of any kind to it. I have never considered myself a member of the Ku Klux Klan, and if it is responsible for the recent acts of lawlessness and stands for the un-American principles attributed to it by the press and by statements of the various attorneys of the state, I, in common with all law abiding citizens, must be opposed to it.

He was a primary candidate for mayor of Los Angeles in 1929. He was appointed by Governor C. C. Young on May 12, 1930, to replace Reuben F. McClellan on the Los Angeles County Board of Supervisors. He served until 1936, when he was replaced by Leland M. Ford. He died on April 29, 1979, at the age of 89.

Non-profit organization positions
Preceded by Alvin M. Owsley	National Commander of The American Legion; 1923 – 1924	Succeeded by James A. Drain
Political offices
Preceded by Reuben F. McClellan	Los Angeles County Board of Supervisors; 4th district 1930 – 1936	Succeeded by Leland M. Ford
