= 1929 Los Angeles mayoral election =

- June 9, 1929
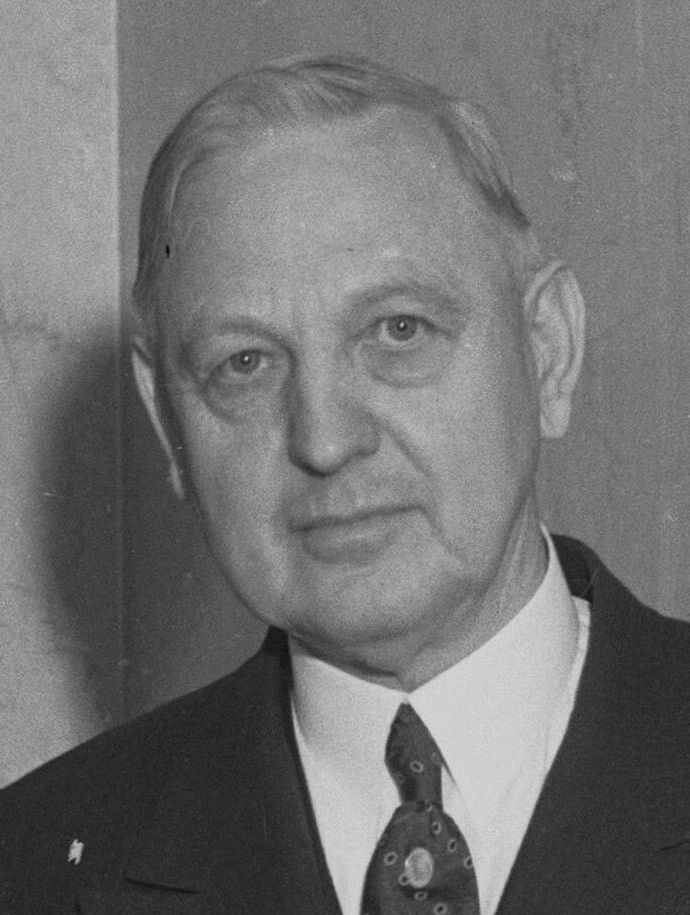

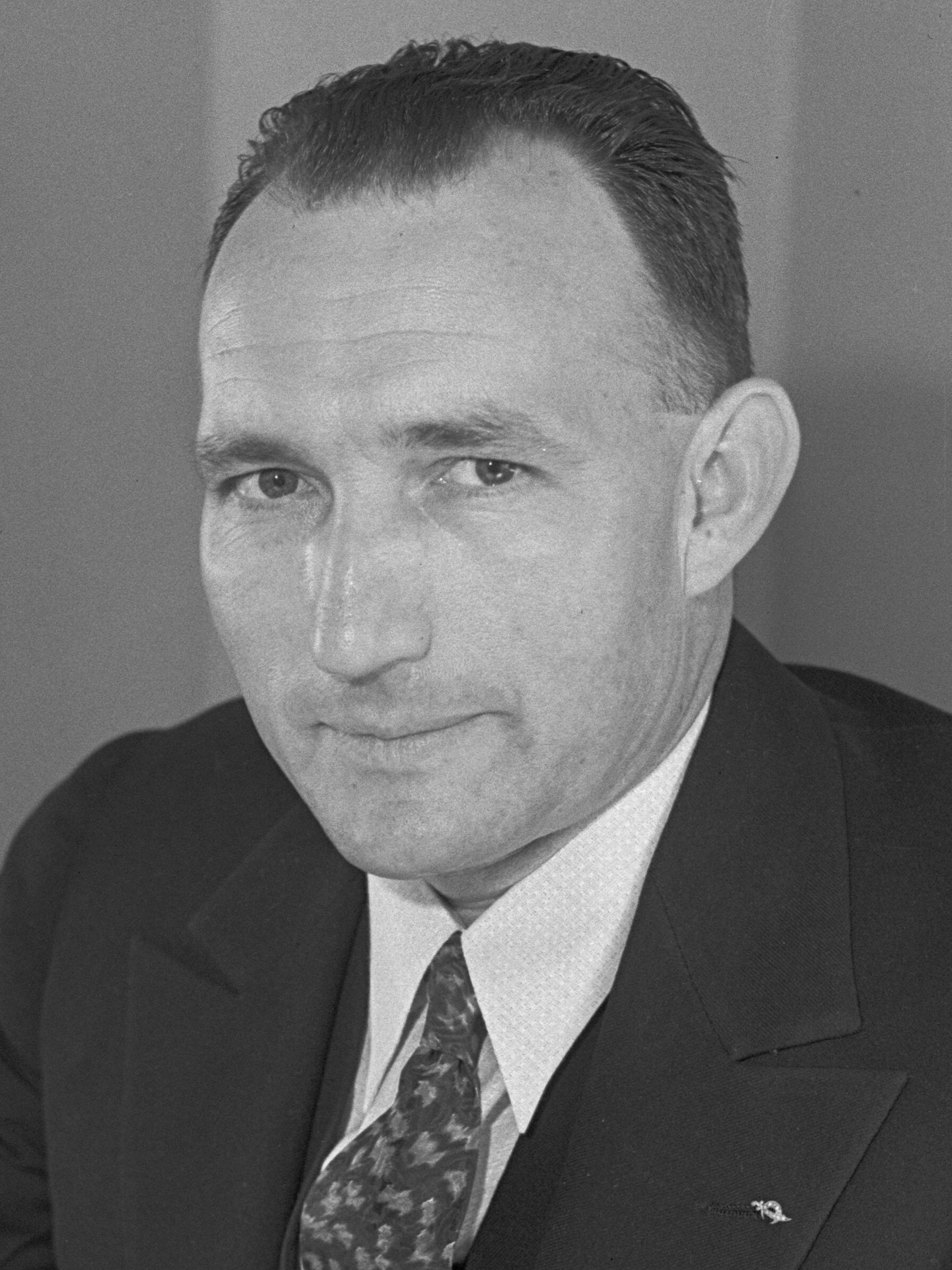

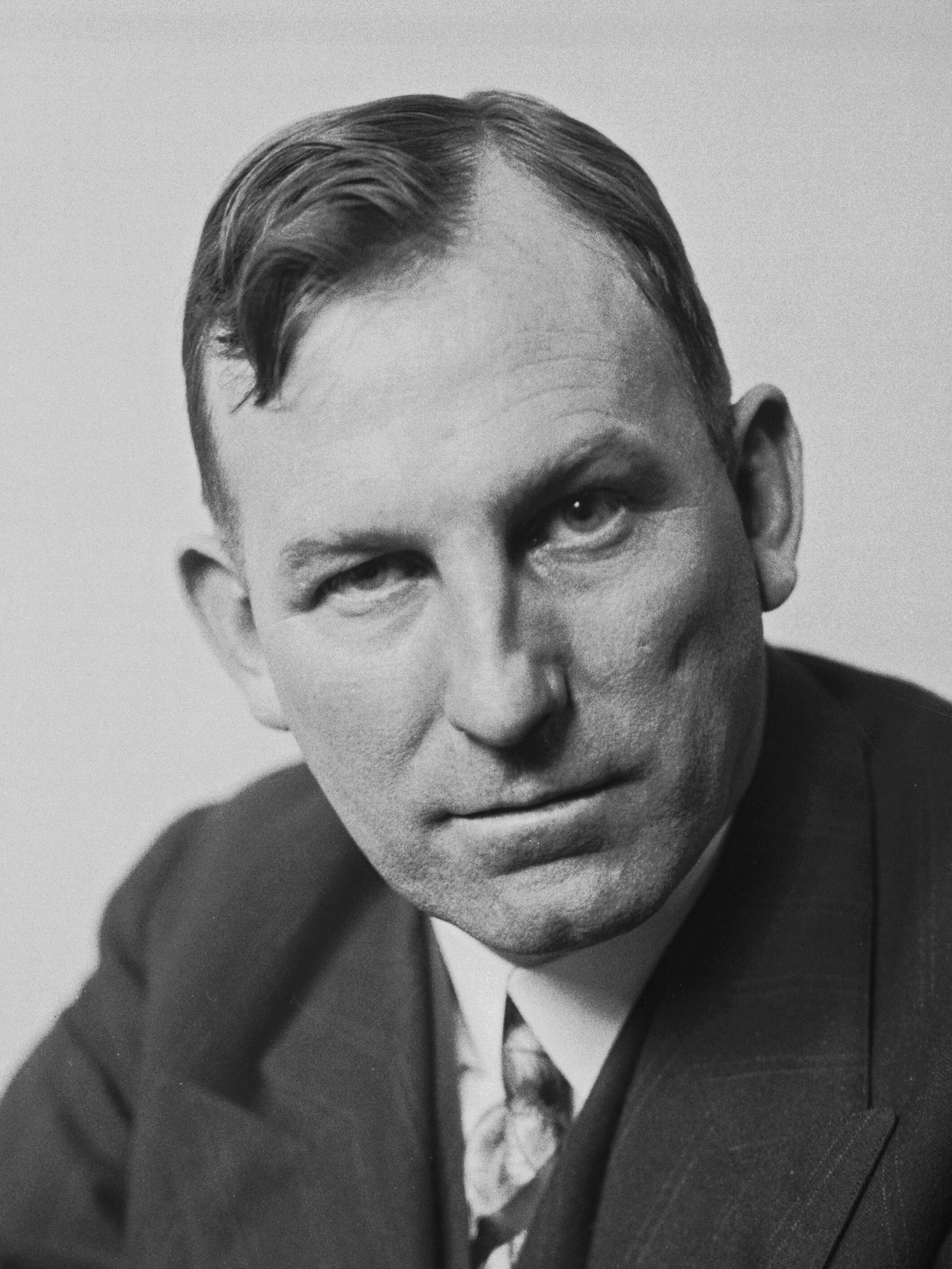

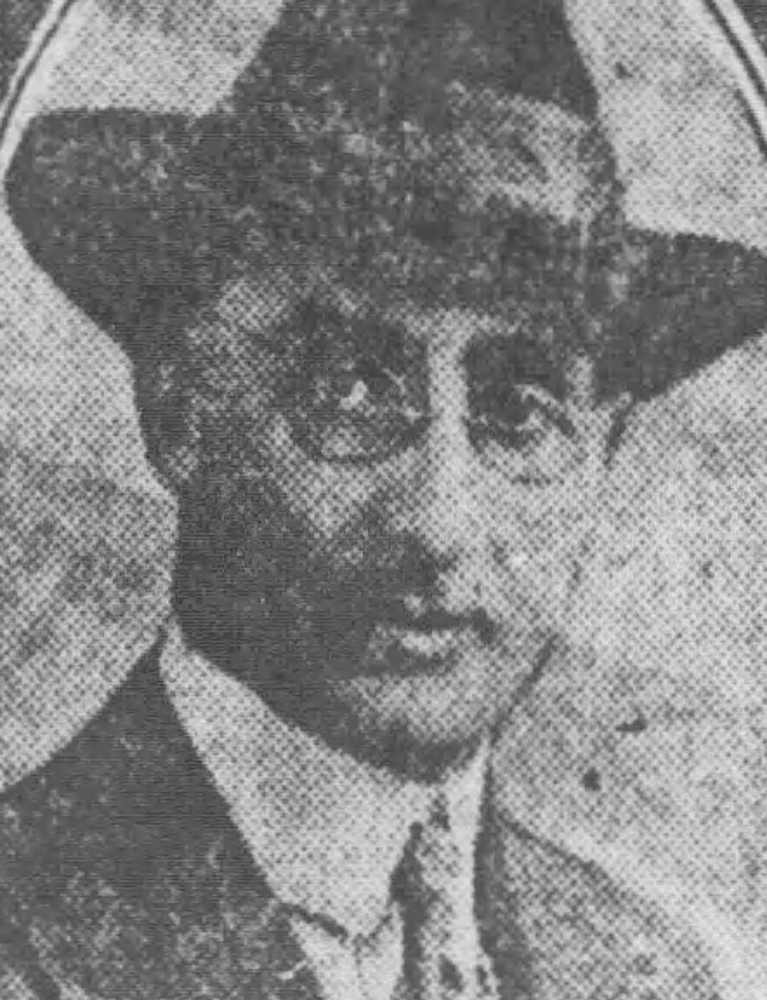
Candidate	John C. Porter	William G. Bonelli
First round	75,198; 36.4%	45,200; 21.9%
Runoff	151,905; 58.8%	106,515; 41.2%
Candidate	John R. Quinn	Perry H. Greer
First round	39,425; 19.1%	22,022; 10.7%
Runoff	Eliminated	Eliminated
Mayor before election
George E. Cryer
Elected Mayor
John Clinton Porter

The 1929 Los Angeles mayoral election took place on June 9, 1929. Incumbent George E. Cryer chose not contest the election and retire from office, making it the first open seat since 1911. The race was won by John Clinton Porter, who defeated Councilman William G. Bonelli, John R. Quinn, and 11 other candidates.

Municipal elections in California, including for mayor of Los Angeles, are officially nonpartisan; candidates' party affiliations do not appear on the ballot.

== Background ==
Because of accusations of corruption and the straining of Mayor Cryer's relationship with Kent Kane Parrot, Parrot leaked to the Los Angeles Record that he would not seek re-election. Cryer himself announced that he would not run for re-election in late February 1929. Democratic John Clinton Porter and Republican William G. Bonelli both campaigned for the office, as well as Republican John R. Quinn, Democratic councilmember Charles J. Colden, and President of the Los Angeles City Council Boyle Workman.

Bonelli was criticized during his campaign for sending an appeal for votes and an attack on Chief James E. Davis and the Police Commission.

== Results ==
Los Angeles mayoral primary election, May 2, 1929
Candidate	Votes	%
John Clinton Porter	75,198	36.42
William G. Bonelli	45,200	21.89
John R. Quinn	39,425	19.09
Perry H. Greer	22,022	10.67
William La Plante	8,182	3.96
Charles J. Colden	4,331	2.098
Carlin G. Smith	3,550	1.72
Nicholas B. Harris	3,503	1.70
Lloyd S. Nix	2,361	1.14
Boyle Workman	2,057	1.00
Charles Hopper	207	0.10
Ralph L. Knapp	188	0.09
Adam C. Derkum	179	0.09
David Horsley	73	0.04
Total votes	206,476	100.00

Los Angeles mayoral general election, June 9, 1929
Candidate	Votes	%
John Clinton Porter	151,905	58.78
William G. Bonelli	106,515	41.22
Total votes	258,420	100.00
