= Kevin de León =

American politician (born 1966)

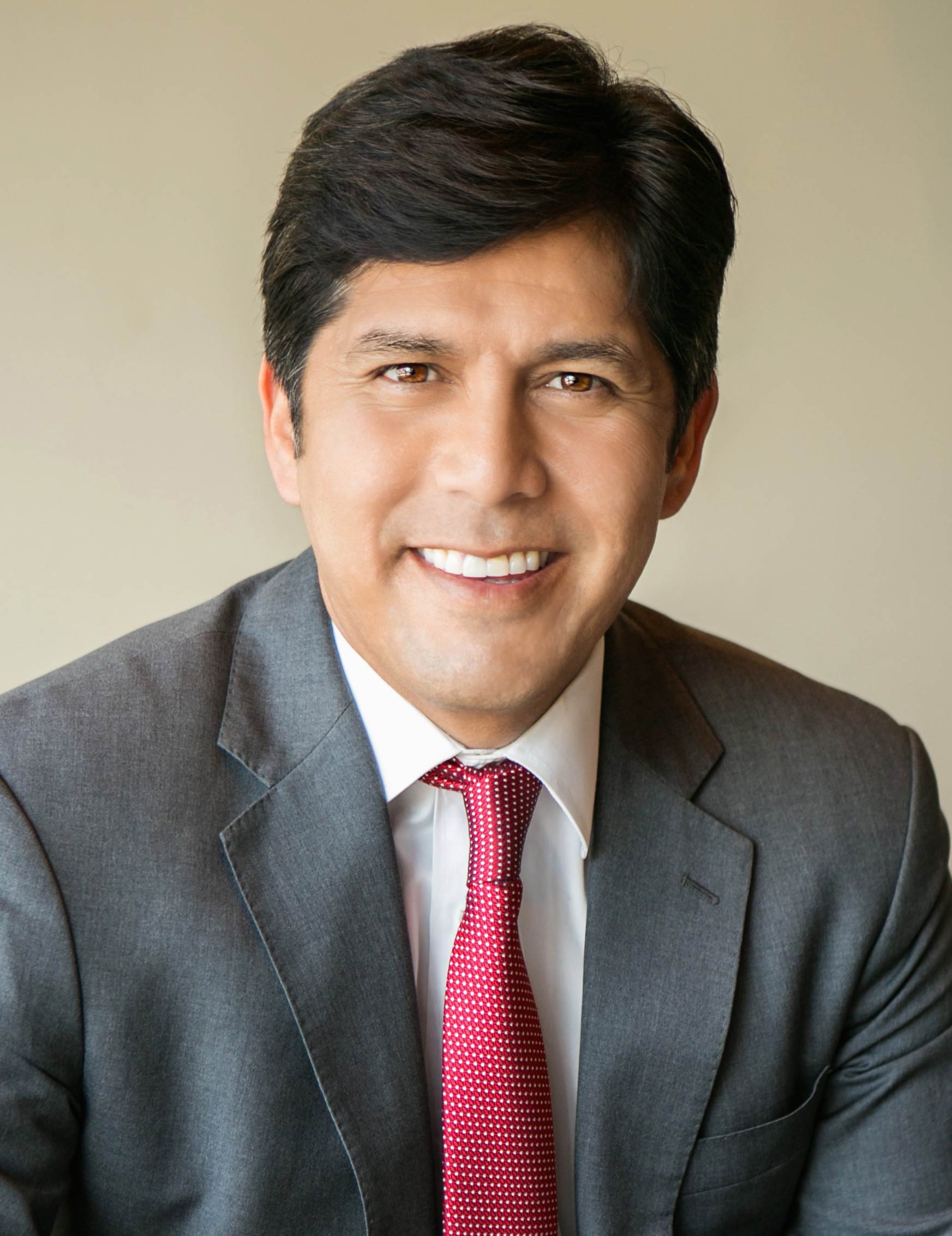
- Official portrait, circa 2014

Member of the Los Angeles City Council from the 14th district
- In office October 15, 2020 – December 9, 2024
- Preceded by: José Huizar
- Succeeded by: Ysabel Jurado

50th President pro tempore of the California State Senate
- In office October 15, 2014 – March 21, 2018
- Preceded by: Darrell Steinberg
- Succeeded by: Toni Atkins

Member of the California State Senate
- In office December 6, 2010 – November 30, 2018
- Preceded by: Gil Cedillo
- Succeeded by: Maria Elena Durazo
- Constituency: 22nd district (2010–2014); 24th district (2014–2018)

Member of the California State Assembly from the 45th district
- In office December 4, 2006 – November 30, 2010
- Preceded by: Jackie Goldberg
- Succeeded by: Gil Cedillo

Personal details
- Born: Kevin Alexander Leon; December 10, 1966 (age 59) Los Angeles, California, U.S.
- Party: Democratic
- Education: Pitzer College (BA); University of California, Santa Barbara (attended)
- Website: Campaign website

Kevin Alexander Leon (born December 10, 1966), known professionally as Kevin de León and colloquially as KDL, is an American politician who served as the Los Angeles City Council member for District 14 from 2020 until 2024. A member of the Democratic Party, he ran and was defeated in the 2018 United States Senate election in California against incumbent Senator Dianne Feinstein and came in third place with 7.79% of the vote in the 2022 Los Angeles mayoral election.

From 2006 to 2010, de León represented the 45th district in the California State Assembly. He represented the 22nd state senate district from 2010 to 2014, and the 24th state senate district from 2014 to 2018. He was President pro tempore of the California State Senate from October 15, 2014 to March 21, 2018. He was elected to the city council in 2020, and defeated in 2024 by Ysabel Jurado.

Beginning in October 2022, there were widespread calls for his resignation after an audio recording of him and other council members making racist and derogatory remarks was leaked. He was formally censured by the Los Angeles City Council in a unanimous 12–0 vote on October 26, 2022. In December 2022, De León gained further notoriety when he was videotaped in a physical conflict with an activist, in which de León "grabs [the activist] and throws him into a table."

== Early life and education ==
Kevin Leon was born in Los Angeles, to Carmen Osorio and Andrés Leon. Both his parents were born in Guatemala with his father being of full or partial Chinese descent. His mother moved from Guatemala to Tijuana, Mexico in the 1960s. She moved to Los Angeles to work as a housekeeper. A single mother with two children, she met Leon's father who was largely absent. His mother married a man of Mexican descent, taking the name Carmen Osorio Núñez, and relocated to San Diego. She divorced and raised him in the Logan Heights neighborhood in San Diego. He also spent part of his youth in Tijuana where his stepfather's family was located. He strongly identifies with Mexican culture.

De León attended Perkins Elementary School, Albert Einstein Elementary School Roosevelt Middle School, and San Diego High School. The first in his family to graduate from high school, he briefly attended the University of California, Santa Barbara before dropping out. He later earned a bachelor's degree from Pitzer College in 2003. While attending UC Santa Barbara, he began going by Kevin de León though he has never legally changed his name.

After dropping out of college, de León worked for One Stop Immigration Center, a nonprofit organization in Los Angeles that assists undocumented immigrants. He later became a labor organizer for the California Teachers Association, and campaign manager for Fabian Nuñez's campaign for California State Assembly in 2002. De León and Nuñez have been close political allies for most of their careers.

== California State Assembly (2006–2010) ==
De León first ran for office in 2006 defeating Christine Chavez, the granddaughter of labor leader Cesar E. Chavez, to replace the outgoing Jackie Goldberg as the California state assemblymember for the 45th district, covering Hollywood and much of Northeast Los Angeles.

In 2008, eyewitnesses on the floor of the state assembly observed de León casting a so-called ghost vote for assemblywoman Mary Hayashi on an affordable housing bill, opposite the way she would have voted, when Hayashi was away from the assembly floor. De León said he had no memory of the incident but also said he did not deny it, either. De León was investigated by then-state assembly speaker Karen Bass, but did not face any punishment and the vote was later changed. As a result of the controversy, Bass changed assembly rules to enforce a ban on ghost voting.

In 2009, de León was defeated in a bid to become speaker of the California state assembly, after many assembly members found de León's ambitious nature grating, eroding his support, according to reports in the Los Angeles Times.

== California State Senate (2010–2018) ==
De León was elected to the California state senate in 2010 and became state senate president pro tempore in 2014. As a California state senator, De León has been generally regarded as a liberal and describes himself as a "proud progressive."

=== Energy and the environment ===
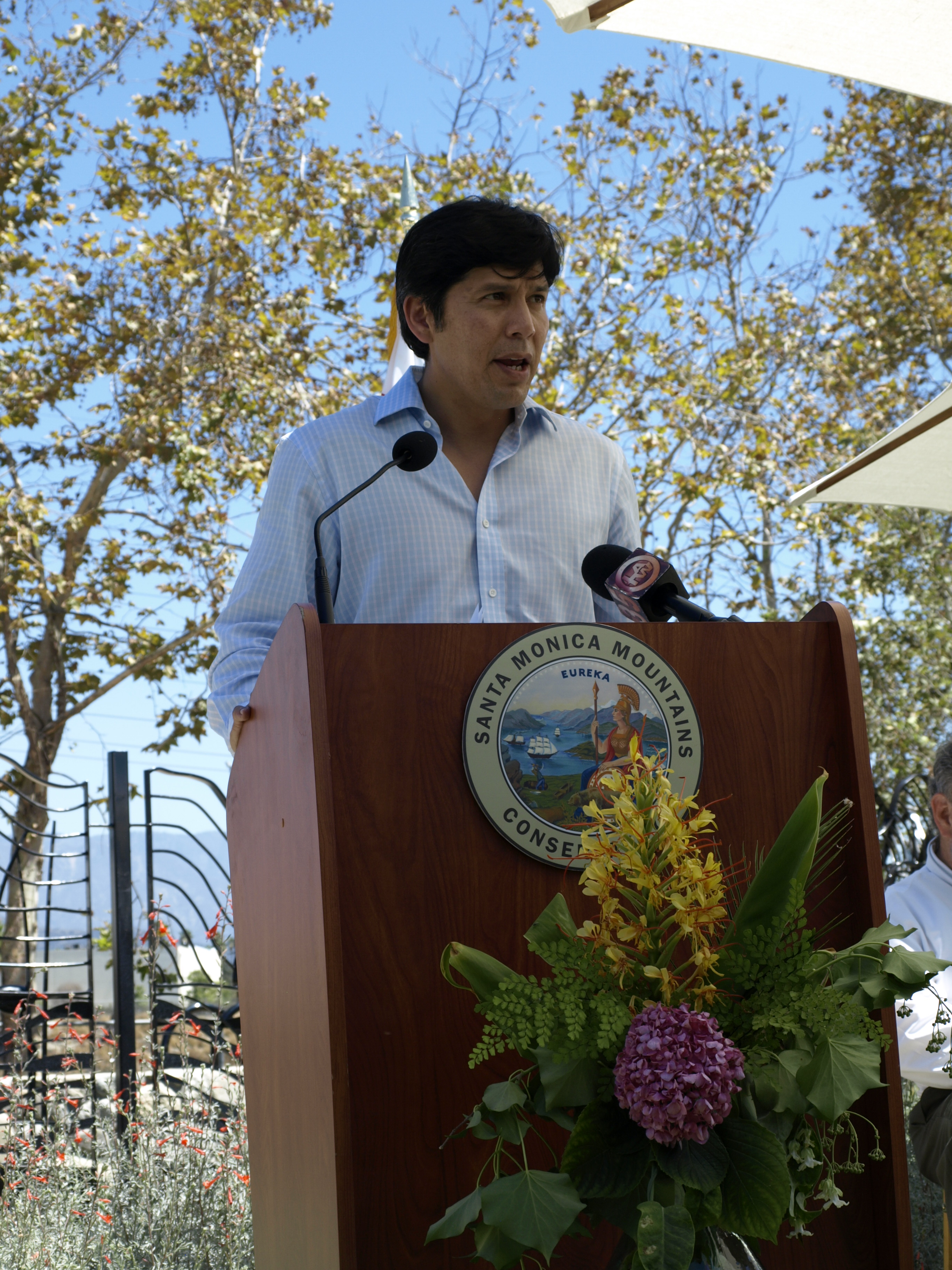
De León in 2014

De León sponsored SB 100, which would have required the state of California to generate 50% renewable electricity by 2026 and 100% renewable electricity by 2045. In 2018, the bill passed both houses of the California state legislature and was signed into law by governor Jerry Brown on September 10.

In late 2017, de León was criticized for playing a role in killing a bill that would have blocked the controversial Cadiz Water Project, a proposal to mine and transfer groundwater from protected desert habitat in Eastern San Bernardino county to parts of Orange county. Opponents of the project blamed De León, then president pro tempore of the senate, and pointed out that the company behind the project had donated $5,000 to De León's political campaign. Fabian Nuñez, a close ally and donor to De León, also represented the company as its lobbyist.

De León criticized the state's high-speed rail project, arguing that construction should have started in major cities like San Francisco and Los Angeles, rather than the state's Central Valley.

=== Gun control ===
De León is an advocate of gun control. In 2014, he sponsored SB 808, which addressed the personal fabrication of firearms. The bill was subsequently vetoed by governor Jerry Brown.

In 2016, De León led the charge in the passage of a package of 11 bills intended to prevent gun violence. These included De León's SB 1235, which created a new framework for buying and selling ammunition designed to address the ambiguities of his earlier SB 53, and his SB 1407, requiring a serial number from the California Department of Justice before building or assembling a gun.

=== Health care ===
De León is a supporter of creating a single-payer health care system. He promised to support senator Bernie Sanders's "Medicare for All" legislation if elected to the United States Senate. He supported SB 562, a proposed bill to create a single payer health care system in California, which stalled in 2017.

=== Gender equity ===
De León authored SB 548, legislation that would make significant investments in child care, with a focus on empowering women in the workforce. The state budget resulted with new funding for thousands of more slots for subsidized child care.

In 2014, de León co-authored Yes Means Yes, the first law in the nation regarding affirmative consent and sought both to improve how universities handle rape and sexual assault cases and to clarify the standards, requiring an "affirmative consent" and stating that consent can't be given if someone is asleep or incapacitated by drugs or alcohol. "Lack of protest or resistance does not mean consent," the law states, "nor does silence mean consent." In 2015, de León co-authored follow-up legislation that requires public high schools teaching health education classes to include sexual assault prevention and strategies on how to build healthy peer relationships in their curricula.

== 2018 U.S. Senate election ==
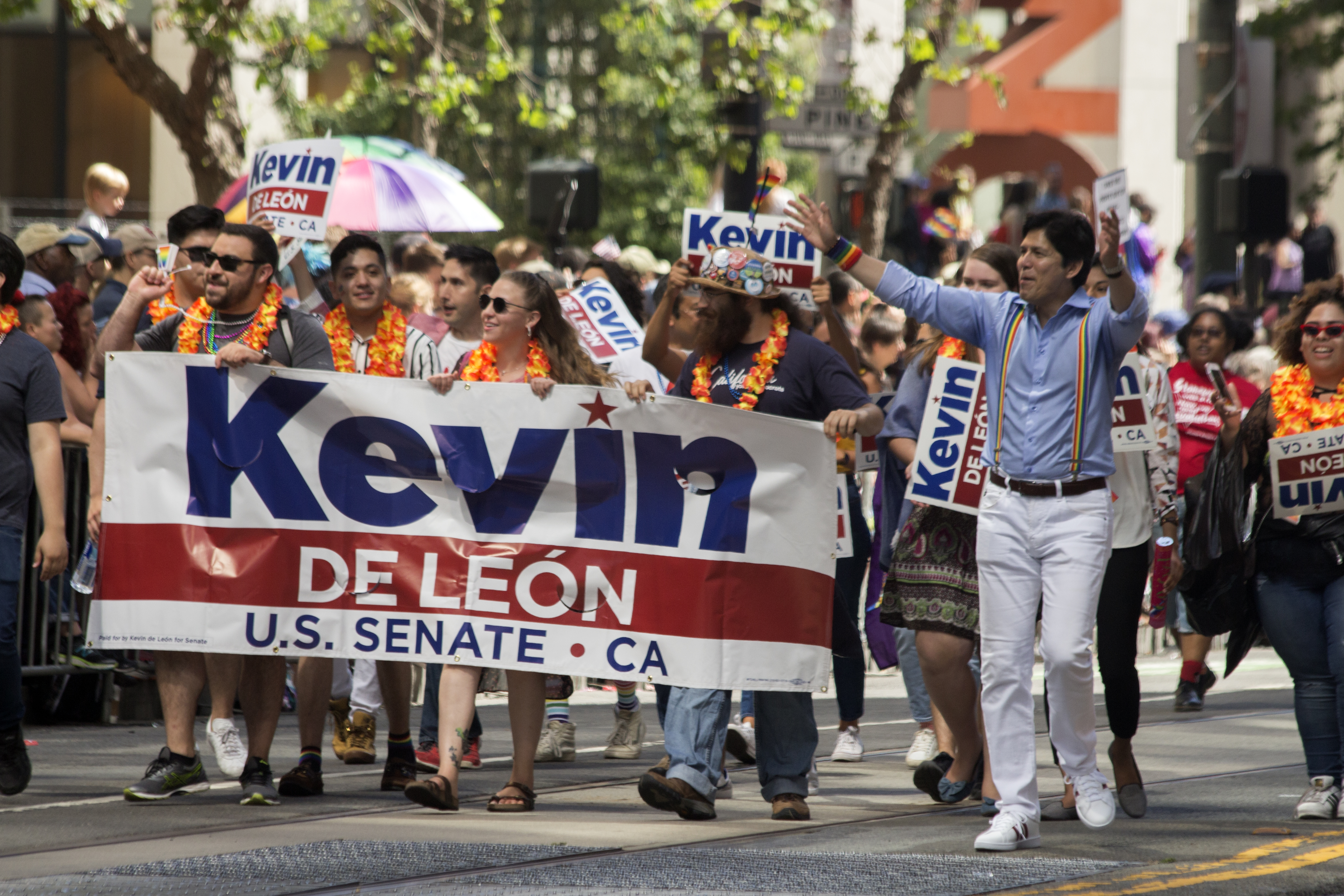
De León walking during a parade with supporters, 2018.

On October 15, 2017, de León announced his bid for the United States Senate, challenging incumbent U.S. Senator Dianne Feinstein in the 2018 election. The following day a super PAC created by California political strategists Dave Jacobson and Maclen Zilber was formed to support his candidacy. On June 5, de León came in second place in the nonpartisan blanket primary with 12% of the total vote, enough to advance to the November general election. Feinstein received 44%, while the third place candidate, James Bradley, received 8% of the total vote. Republican candidates collectively received 33% of the vote.

De León's 12% was the lowest ever recorded for a candidate who advanced to the general election since California instituted its nonpartisan blanket primary rules in 2016. In July, De León won the endorsement of the California Democratic Party at their executive board meeting in Oakland. Despite the endorsement, however, De León's campaign faced fundraising struggles and low name recognition.

On November 6, 2018, Feinstein defeated De León 54.2% to 45.8%. The race had an undervote of around 1.3 million votes compared to the gubernatorial election, likely by Republican voters choosing not to cast a vote for either candidate.

== Los Angeles City Council (2020–2024) ==
In 2020, de León was a candidate for a March special election to the Los Angeles city council. The seat had previously been vacated by José Huizar, who was the subject of an investigation into possible corruption charges. In June 2020, Huizar was arrested and charged with several counts of bribery and corruption. De León was elected in the special election to succeed him, and assumed office on October 15, 2020.

After winning election, de León was paid $109,000 by the AIDS Healthcare Foundation (AHF) for consultancy work, as well as over $100,000 from an electrical workers' union for work as a strategic advisor, as well as over $100,000 from the University of Southern California, between $10,001 and $100,000 from California Community Foundation, between $10,001 and $100,000 from Elemental Excelerator, between $10,0001 and $100,000 from New Venture Fund. His salary as council member was $220,000. Once in the City Council, De León reportedly pressured one of his staffers, who had no experience investigating housing issues and who had tried to intimidate L.A. police officers, to stop investigating alleged building and health code violations at properties owned by AHF in De León's district. Internal communications revealed by the L.A. Times showed that De León told a staff member that angry messages are "coming from the top" of L.A.P.D. about the staff member's aggressive words aimed at L.A. police officers. An ethics experts expressed concerns about conflicts of interests by De Leon over another alleged instance of failing to disclose AHF's payment in a meeting before taking a City Council seat, but no concerns were raised about AHF's ethics.

In 2021, de León advocated against SB 9, which would allow for the construction of duplexes in lots that are zoned as single-family home neighborhoods. The bill was intended to alleviate the severe housing shortage in California. That same year, de León sought to stall the construction of a rapid transit bus line through Eagle Rock, which prompted a critical editorial by the Los Angeles Times which characterized de León as a "spoiler."

In 2022, de León championed the "Clean Streets Now" plan, his plan to reduce illegal dumping throughout the city.

=== 2022 racism scandal ===
In October 2022, an audio recording of a private 2021 meeting attended by de León, fellow Council member Gil Cedillo, Los Angeles County Federation of Labor President Ron Herrera, and Council president Nury Martinez came to light in which Martinez made racist remarks about the adopted black son of their white City Council colleague Mike Bonin, comparing Bonin's treatment of his son to the way one handles a handbag. They also used slurs against indigenous Oaxacan people who live in Koreatown, and discussed redistricting in order to break up black voting districts, turning them into Latino ones through the process of gerrymandering. He apologized for taking part in the conversation, but refused to resign.

=== Calls for resignation and recall attempts ===
In the aftermath of the leaked racist recordings by de Leon and others, dozens of prominent politicians, including President Joe Biden and Mike Bonin, called for the resignations of all involved. and Southern California News Group opinion editor Sal Rodriguez. On October 19, 2022, in an interview with CBS Los Angeles, de León stated his refusal to resign, stating he needs to do the hard work to restore trust. However, he did not take responsibility so much for his own words as he did for his failure in having not put a stop to the conversation. He attempted to spin his racist joke comparing Bonin's son to a handbag as having been more of a joke about Martinez's penchant for luxury accessories. Bonin has stated that he was, "really disappointed, and sort of disgusted" by the answers de León gave in the interview. He went on to say that de León had simply left him a voicemail, which did not amount to an apology. Other than that, de León has not spoken to Bonin since the recording was leaked. On October 26, the City Council unanimously voted 12–0 to formally censure de Léon along with Cedillo and Martinez for their actions.

Recall paperwork was filed by five of de León's constituents on October 27, 2022, with leadership problems and the racist audio leak cited as major reasons for recalling de León. However, the recall campaign failed to acquire the required 20,437 signatures by the deadline—and as a result, no recall referendum was held. Nury Martinez had faced a brief recall effort led by Alex Gruenenfelder prior to her resignation, and Gil Cedillo was too late in his tenure to be recalled. Prior to the scandal, there had been three unsuccessful attempts to recall de León, on the grounds of his failure to tackle homelessness and adequately support law enforcement. All four of these efforts were coordinated by Eagle Rock resident Pauline Adkins.

In December 2022, de León was involved in an altercation with protestors at a community event. Video of the incident was subsequently released which showed that the physical altercation started when a community activist blocked de León while de León attempted to exit the building, and ending with de Leon's hands near the activist's neck as he pulled the activist down onto a table.

=== 2024 election ===
Running for reelection in 2024, Kevin de León came in second place in the top-two primary, with Ysabel Jurado, a tenants rights attorney and affordable housing activist, coming in first. de Leon lost his re-election bid as Jurado defeated de Leon in the November general election with a margin of 57.17% to 42.83%.

== Personal life ==
De León lives in Los Angeles and has an adult daughter, Lluvia Carrasco. Carrasco's mother is former San Jose councilmember Magdalena Carrasco. De León has never been married.

== Electoral history ==
=== 2018 U.S. Senate election ===
Nonpartisan blanket primary results, California 2018
Party	Candidate	Votes	%
Democratic	Dianne Feinstein (incumbent)	2,947,035	44.12%
Democratic	Kevin de León	805,446	12.07%
Republican	James P. Bradley	556,252	8.34%
Republican	Arun K. Bhumitra	350,815	5.26%
Republican	Paul A. Taylor	323,533	4.85%
Republican	Erin Cruz	267,494	4.01%
Republican	Tom Palzer	205,183	3.08%
Democratic	Alison Hartson	147,061	2.21%
Republican	Rocky De La Fuente	135,278	2.03%
Democratic	Pat Harris	126,947	1.90%
Republican	John "Jack" Crew	93,806	1.41%
Republican	Patrick Little	89,867	1.35%
Republican	Kevin Mottus	87,646	1.31%
Republican	Jerry Joseph Laws	67,140	1.01%
Libertarian	Derrick Michael Reid	59,999	0.90%
Democratic	Adrienne Nicole Edwards	56,172	0.84%
Democratic	Douglas Howard Pierce	42,671	0.64%
Republican	Mario Nabliba	39,209	0.59%
Democratic	David Hildebrand	30,305	0.45%
Democratic	Donnie O. Turner	30,101	0.45%
Democratic	Herbert G. Peters	27,468	0.41%
No party preference	David Moore	24,614	0.37%
No party preference	Ling Ling Shi	23,506	0.35%
Peace and Freedom	John Thompson Parker	22,825	0.34%
No party preference	Lee Olson	20,393	0.31%
Democratic	Gerald Plummer	18,234	0.27%
No party preference	Jason M. Hanania	18,171	0.27%
No party preference	Don J. Grundmann	15,125	0.23%
No party preference	Colleen Shea Fernald	13,536	0.20%
No party preference	Rash Bihari Ghosh	12,557	0.19%
No party preference	Tim Gildersleeve	8,482	0.13%
No party preference	Michael Fahmy Girgis	2,986	0.05%
Write-in		863	0.01%
Total votes		6,670,720	100%

United States Senate election in California, 2018
Party	Candidate	Votes	%	±%
Democratic	Dianne Feinstein (incumbent)	6,019,422	54.16%	−8.36%
Democratic	Kevin de León	5,093,942	45.84%	N/A
Total votes		11,113,364	100%	N/A
Democratic hold				

=== 2020 Los Angeles City Council election ===
2020 Los Angeles City Council District 14 election
Primary election
Candidate	Votes	%
Kevin de León	25,083	52.61
Cyndi Otteson	9,294	19.49
Raquel Zamora	6,483	13.60
Mónica García	5,222	10.95
John Jimenez	1,595	3.35
Total votes	47,677	100.00

=== 2022 Los Angeles mayoral election ===
2022 Los Angeles mayoral primary election
Primary election
Candidate	Votes	%
Karen Bass	278,511	43.11
Rick Caruso	232,490	35.99
Kevin de León	50,372	7.79
Gina Viola	44,341	6.86
Mike Feuer (withdrawn)	12,087	1.87
Andrew Kim	9,405	1.46
Alex Gruenenfelder Smith	6,153	0.95
Joe Buscaino (withdrawn)	4,485	0.69
Craig Greiwe	2,439	0.38
Mel Wilson	2,336	0.36
Ramit Varma (withdrawn)	1,916	0.30
John "Jsamuel" Jackson	1,511	0.23
Write-in	12	0.01
Total votes	646,058	100.00

=== 2024 Los Angeles City Council election ===
2024 Los Angeles City Council District 14 election
Primary election
Candidate	Votes	%
Ysabel J. Jurado	8,618	24.52
Kevin de Leon (incumbent)	8,220	23.39
Miguel Santiago	7,470	21.25
Wendy Carrillo	5,321	15.14
Eduardo "Lalo" Vargas	1,638	4.66
Teresa Y. Hillery	1,519	4.32
Genny Guerrero	1,457	4.15
Nadine Diaz	904	2.57
Total votes	35,147	100.00
General election
Ysabel J. Jurado	46,007	57.17
Kevin de León (incumbent)	34,472	42.83
Total votes	80,479	100.00

California Senate
Preceded by Darrell Steinberg	President pro tempore of the California State Senate; 2014–2018	Succeeded by Toni Atkins
