= William G. Bonelli =

American politician (1895–1970)

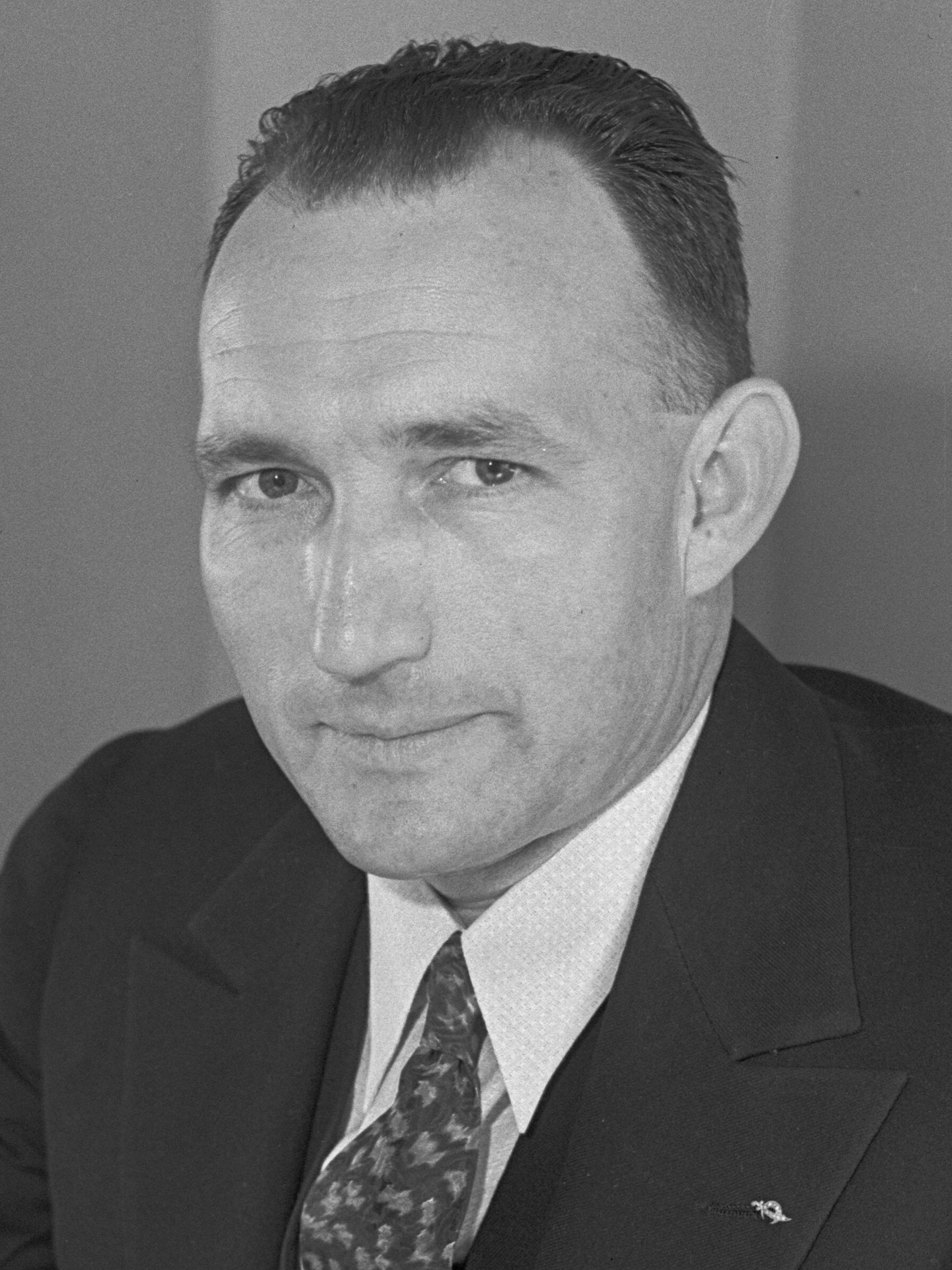
- Bonelli in 1935

Member of the California State Assembly from the 54th district
- In office January 5, 1931 – January 2, 1933
- Preceded by: Augustus F. Jewett Jr.
- Succeeded by: Frank J. Rogers

President of the Los Angeles City Council
- In office July 1, 1927 – June 30, 1929
- Preceded by: Boyle Workman
- Succeeded by: Winfred J. Sanborn

Personal details
- Born: William George Bonelli; November 9, 1895 Kingman, Arizona, U.S.
- Died: November 21, 1970 (aged 75) Mexico
- Education: University of Southern California; Occidental College; Southwestern Law School
- Occupation: Politician

William George Bonelli (November 9, 1895 – November 21, 1970) was a California Republican politician and former member of the California State Board of Equalization who fled to Mexico to avoid arrest on a corruption indictment.

== Biography ==
Son of a pioneer American family of Swiss-English descent, Bonelli was born in Kingman, Arizona and moved to Los Angeles in 1912. He entered the University of Southern California and received his bachelor of arts degree in 1916. He then served in the Aviation Section of the U.S. Army in 1918–19 and remained in the Reserve as a pilot until 1934.

Bonelli obtained his master of arts degree from Occidental College in 1923 and his law degree from Southwestern Law School in 1924; he was admitted to the California Bar in 1925.

He became a promoter of the Southern California aircraft industry and the Santa Clarita Valley. He purchased Hoot Gibson's rodeo venue in 1937 in Saugus, California and ran rodeos until a quarter-mile dirt track was built in 1939; it was later renamed Bonelli Ranch Stadium. It hosted a myriad of events showcasing midget cars and hot rods (roadsters). Later, the track was expanded to one-third mile. In 1954, the surface was paved and the name changed to Saugus Speedway. The paved track brought on the transition to stock cars, which was the primary format through 1995, when the track was closed.

Bonelli had two sons, Robert, of Phoenix, Arizona, and William Jr. of Saugus, California. He died November 21, 1970, in Mexico.

== Career ==
=== Academia ===
He was associate professor of political science at Occidental College for seven years, until 1929.

=== Los Angeles ===
Bonelli was elected to represent Los Angeles City Council District 14 in the May 1927 primary, winning the majority of votes over seven other candidates. He did not run for reelection in 1929, instead choosing to challenge John C. Porter in the mayor's race, which Porter won.

The youngest member at age 36 and a newcomer on the incoming 1927 City Council, Bonelli was chosen for the position of president of the council after it was determined that none of the other nominees — Charles J. Colden. Howard W. Davis and Frank L. Shaw — could attain a majority of votes. He was named on the 56th ballot of a council caucus.

Bonelli, who was seen as an opponent of the George E. Cryer administration, declared in his inaugural address after being elected president that the council should "use its efforts to prevent the police department from being swayed from its duty by 'outside control.'" Nevertheless, when Bonelli himself was running for mayor in 1929, he was criticized for sending an appeal for votes and an attack on Chief James E. Davis and the Police Commission in letters bearing his office title to two thousand members of the department.

As a council member, he was a supporter of a $6 million bond issue that would develop a city-owned airport on any one of the three sites — Mines, Vail and Sesnon — then under consideration.

=== Corruption ===
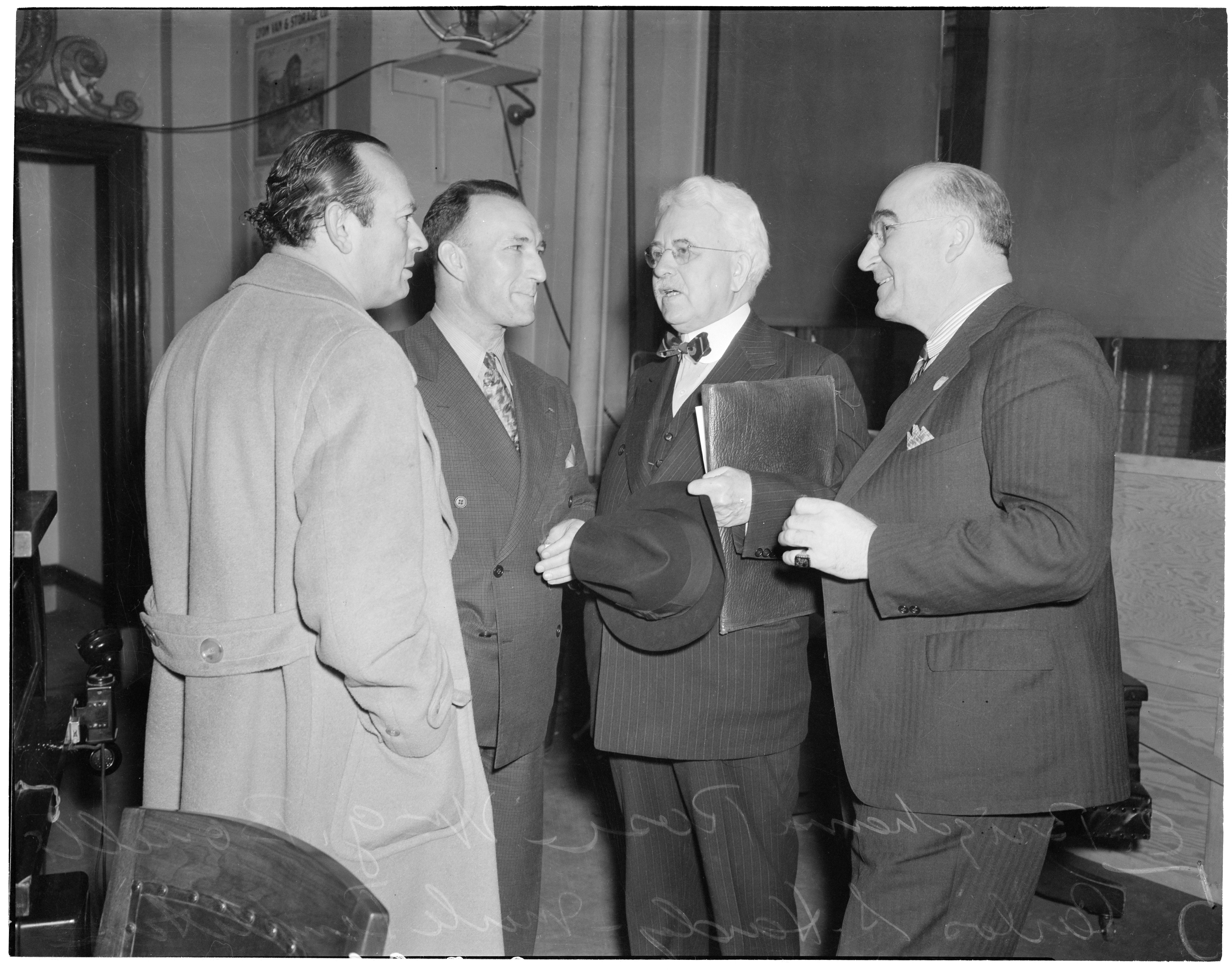
Bonelli (second from left) with three others, during a break in his trial, c. 1939–40

In 1931 he was elected to the California State Assembly from the 54th District, and from 1934 to 1938 was director of the State Department of Professional and Vocational Standards. He was then appointed to the State Board of Equalization, the state agency that approved liquor licenses. Bonelli was indicted by a Los Angeles grand jury in November 1939, along with six others, on charges of soliciting bribes in a $10 million "annual liquor license pay-off scandal."

A series of articles in the Los Angeles Mirror in 1953 accused Bonelli of a long involvement in kickbacks on liquor licenses, bribery and criminal associations.

Bonelli hired journalist Leo Katcher to ghost-write Billion Dollar Blackjack: The Story of Corruption and the Los Angeles Times (1954), in which Bonelli, as the ostensible author, defended himself and attacked the Chandlers. He also sued the Mirror for $1.15. million for libel; it had run front-page stories calling him the Liquor Czar. Facing an impending grand jury indictment, Bonelli found exile in Mexico where he spent the rest of his life. He tried numerous times to have the court case moved from Los Angeles County to San Diego County because he said he could never get a fair trial in Los Angeles County because it was under the control of the Times.

He had a running battle with the Los Angeles Police Department and Harrison Gray Otis's and Harry and Norman Chandler's Times — which he likened to "a black-jack, a bludgeon, a weapon to be used in behalf of their friends and against their enemies." In his book he accused the Times of all manner of malfeasance, from king-making and union busting to subverting laws, violating civil rights and "aligning class against class, race against race, in an attempt to make bigger profits for themselves."

He died a fugitive in Mexico on November 24, 1970.

| Preceded by Isaac Colton Ash | Los Angeles City Council; 14th District; 1927–1929 | Succeeded by Charles A. Holland |
| Preceded by Boyle Workman | President of the Los Angeles City Council; 1927-1929 | Succeeded by Winfred J. Sanborn |

Political offices
| Preceded by Augustus F. Jewett, Jr. | California State Assembly; 54th District; January 5, 1931 – January 2, 1933 | Succeeded by Frank J. Rogers |
