= Hahn family of California =

American political family in the Los Angeles area

Hahn
- Political family
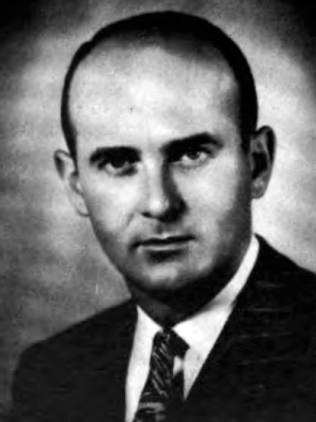
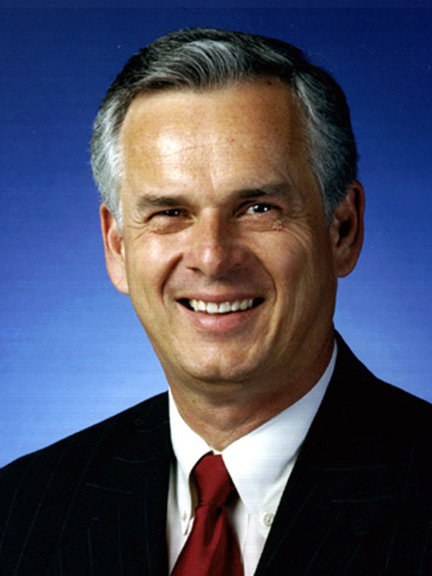
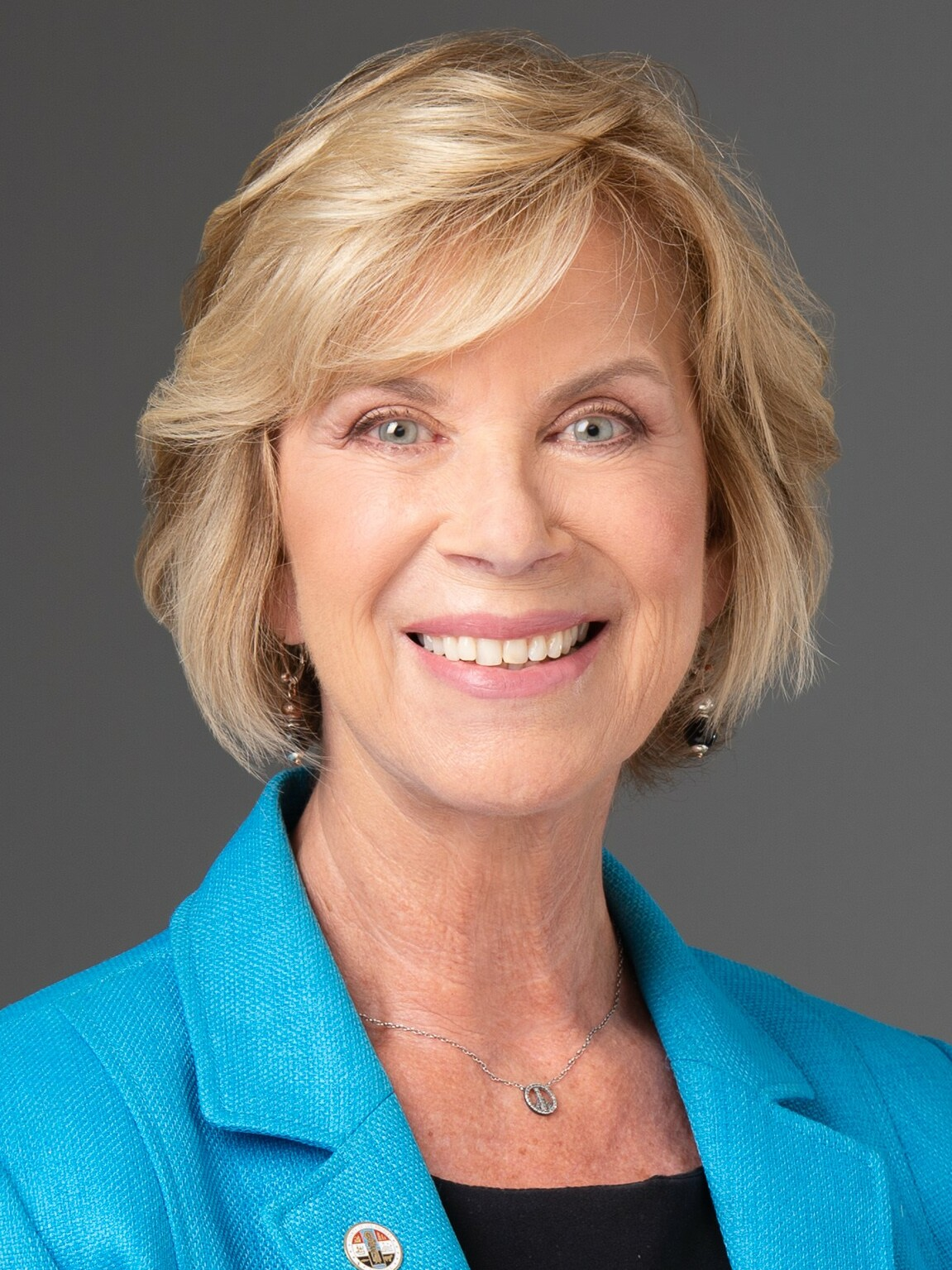
- Top row: Gordon and Kenneth Hahn; Bottom row: James and Janice Hahn
- Country: United States
- Current region: California
- Origin: Los Angeles, California
- Founder: John Heinrich Hahn

The Hahn family of California is an American political family related to Gordon Hahn, a State Assemblyman and Los Angeles City Councilmember, and his younger brother Kenneth Hahn, a Los Angeles City Councilmember and later a County Board Supervisor. Kenneth's children, James and Janice, have also held various political offices based in the Los Angeles area, with the Los Angeles Times writing that their political strength has been compared with the Daleys of Chicago.

== History ==
The Hahn family began when John Heinrich Hahn and his wife, Hattie Louise Wiggins Hahn, emigrated from Saskatchewan to Los Angeles in 1919. The couple had seven children, including Gordon Hahn and Kenneth Hahn. Both brothers attended Pepperdine University, with Gordon later going on to graduate from the United States Merchant Marine Academy. Their older brother, John Dee Hahn, became a civil service employee in 1930 and also was a clerk in the Los Angeles County Superior Court. Some of the brothers, including Kenneth, worked as the Hahn Brothers' Service Station owned by another older brother, Henry.

Kenneth married Ramona Fox in 1948, with the two having two children, James in 1950 and Janice in 1952. Kenneth died on October 12, 1997, due to a heart failure, while Gordon died on March 29, 2001. Ramona would die on July 11, 2011, the day before Janice's election to the U.S. House of Representatives.

=== Political history ===
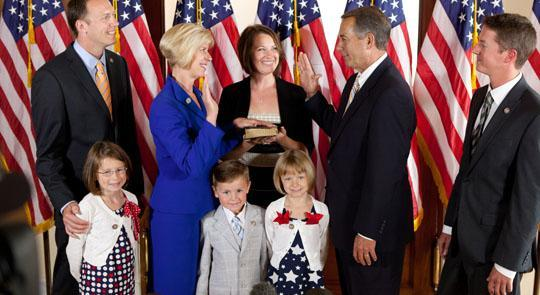
Janice Hahn with her family and House Speaker John Boehner during her swearing-in in 2011.

In 1946, Kenneth attempted to break into politics by running for the State Assembly's 66th district, but was unable to compete due to him winning the Republican nomination but not winning the Democratic nomination as he was a Democrat. Gordon would ultimately get the Republican nomination, and later go on to win a seat in the Assembly. Kenneth would get a seat in the Los Angeles City Council a year later, representing the 8th district.

In 1981, James became the 5th Los Angeles City Controller and later became the 15th Los Angeles City Attorney four years later. In 1987, Dale Hahn, James and Janice's cousin, became a judge of the San Mateo County Superior Court, and would retire in 2004. In 2001, Both James and Janice both won political offices in Los Angeles: James became the 40th Mayor of Los Angeles after defeating California Assembly Speaker Antonio Villaraigosa while Janice became a Los Angeles City Councilmember for the 15th district. James would later lose the 2005 election to Villaraigosa while Janice would later become a member of the United States House of Representatives after a special election in 2011.

In 2009, James was appointed to the Los Angeles County Superior Court by Governor Arnold Schwarzenegger, and in 2016, Janice became a member of the Los Angeles County Board of Supervisors for the 4th district.

== Legacy ==
The Hahn brothers are credited with bringing the Brooklyn Dodgers to Los Angeles, with Kenneth helping with the push to vote and Gordon helping cast a deciding vote on the City Council. They were also known for helping empower black politicians in the area, with Gordon stepping aside for Billy G. Mills on the advice of Kenneth.

Some buildings and parks have been named after the Hahn family. In 1988, the Baldwin Hills State Recreational Area was renamed to the Kenneth Hahn State Recreation Area to honor his preservation efforts there; later on, the Los Angeles County Hall of Administration was renamed to the Kenneth Hahn Hall of Administration in 1992. The 103rd Street/Watts Towers station on the A Line of the Los Angeles Metro Rail was previously named 103rd Street/Kenneth Hahn in his honor.

In 2014, Los Angeles City Hall's City Hall East was renamed to James K. Hahn City Hall East.

== Offices held ==
Gordon Hahn

- Member of the California State Assembly (1947–1953)
- Member of the Los Angeles City Council (1953–1963)

Kenneth Hahn

- Member of the Los Angeles City Council (1947–1953)
- Member of the Los Angeles County Board of Supervisors (1953–1992)

James Hahn

- 5th Los Angeles City Controller (1981–1985)
- 15th Los Angeles City Attorney (1985–2001)
- 40th Mayor of Los Angeles (2001–2005)
- Judge of the Los Angeles County Superior Court (2008–present)

Janice Hahn

- Member of the Los Angeles City Council (2001–2011)
- Member of the U.S. House of Representatives (2011–2016)
- Member of the Los Angeles County Board of Supervisors (2016–present)

Dale Hahn

- Judge of the San Mateo County Superior Court (1987–2004)
