= Tantallon =

Tantallon may be:

- Tantallon Castle, Scotland, UK
- Tantallon, Nova Scotia, Canada
- Upper Tantallon, Nova Scotia, Canada (immediately to the north of Tantallon, Nova Scotia)
- Tantallon, Saskatchewan, Canada
- Tantallon, Maryland, USA
