= 2011 United States House of Representatives elections =

- May 24, 2011 – September 13, 2011

4 of the 435 seats in the United States House of Representatives 218 seats needed for a majority
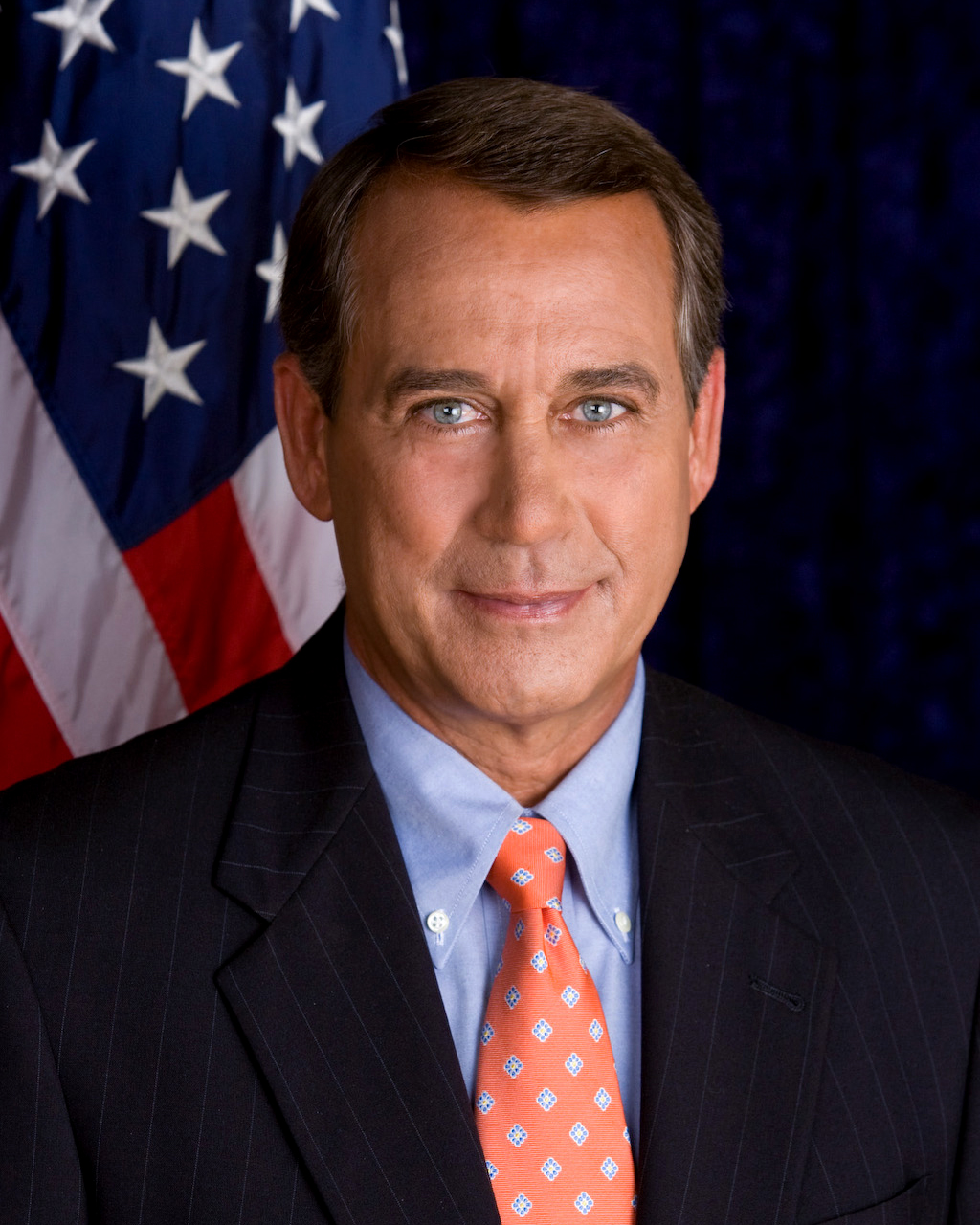

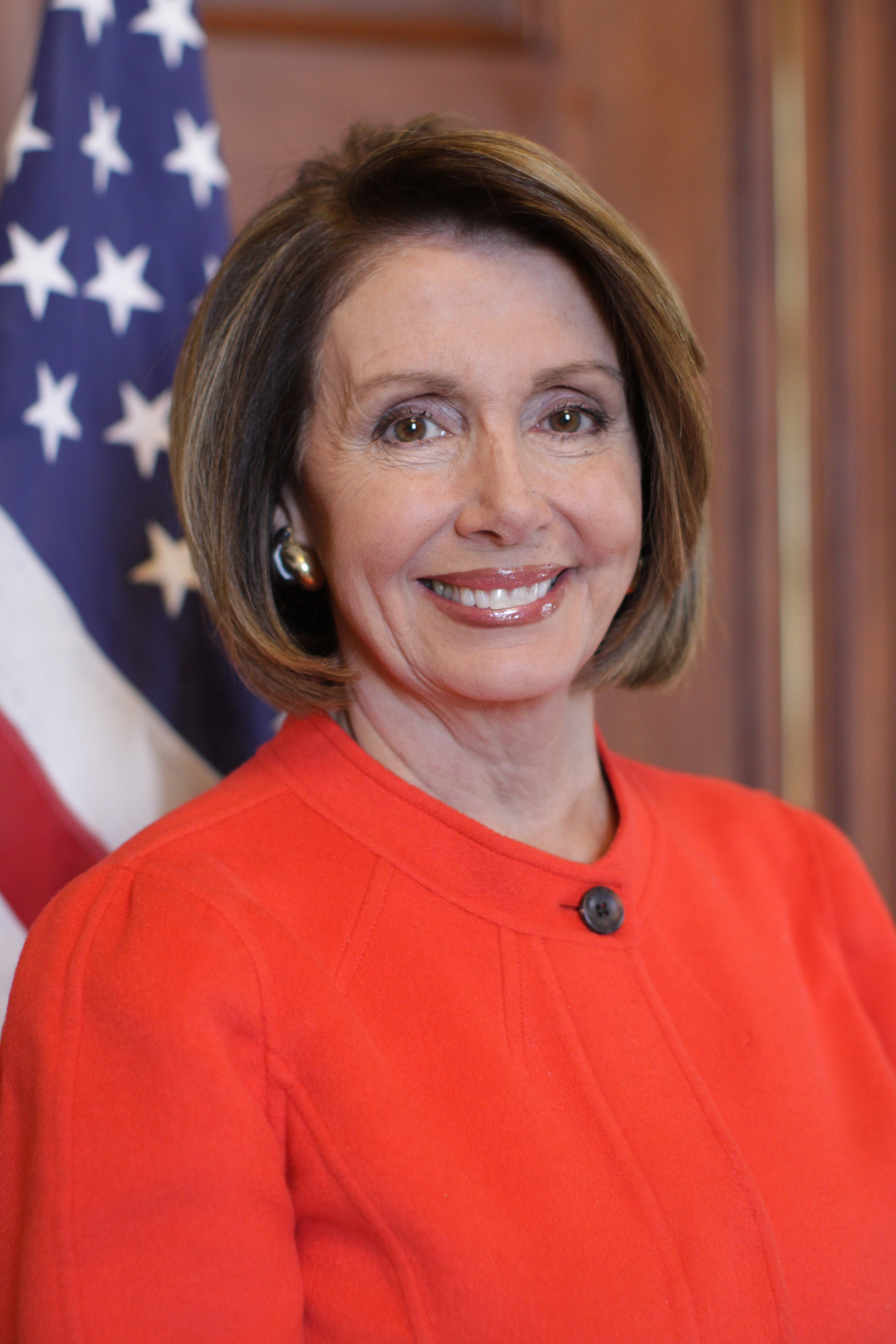
	Majority party	Minority party
Leader	John Boehner	Nancy Pelosi
Party	Republican	Democratic
Leader since	January 3, 2007	January 3, 2003
Leader's seat	Ohio 8th	California 8th
Last election	242 seats	193 seats
Seats won	2	2
Seat change	Steady	Steady

There were four special elections in 2011 to fill vacant seats in the United States House of Representatives.

Two seats switched parties, swapping from Republican to Democratic, and two other seats were held by the same parties.

== Summary ==
Elections are listed by date and district.

District	Incumbent			This race	
District	Member	Party	First elected	Results	Candidates
New York 26	Chris Lee	Republican	2008	Incumbent resigned February 9, 2011 due to a personal scandal. New member elected May 24, 2011. Democratic gain.	▌ ✓ Kathy Hochul (Democratic) 47.24%; ▌Jane Corwin (Republican) 42.28%; ▌Jack Davis (Tea Party) 8.99%; ▌Ian Murphy (Green) 1.05%
California 36	Jane Harman	Democratic	2000	Incumbent resigned February 28, 2011 to become head of the Wilson Center. New member elected July 12, 2011. Democratic hold.	▌ ✓ Janice Hahn (Democratic) 54.89%; ▌Craig Huey (Republican) 45.11%
Nevada 2	Dean Heller	Republican	2006	Incumbent resigned May 9, 2011 after being appointed to the U.S. Senate. New member elected September 13, 2011. Republican hold.	▌ ✓ Mark Amodei (Republican) 57.92%; ▌Kate Marshall (Democratic) 36.07%; ▌Helmuth Lehmann (Independent) 4.14%; ▌Timothy Fasano (Independent American) 1.87%
New York 9	Anthony Weiner	Democratic	1998	Incumbent resigned June 21, 2011 due to personal scandals. New member elected September 13, 2011. Republican gain.	▌ ✓ Bob Turner (Republican) 51.72%; ▌David Weprin (Democratic) 46.62%; ▌Chris Hoppner (Socialist Workers) 0.20%

== New York's 26th congressional district ==
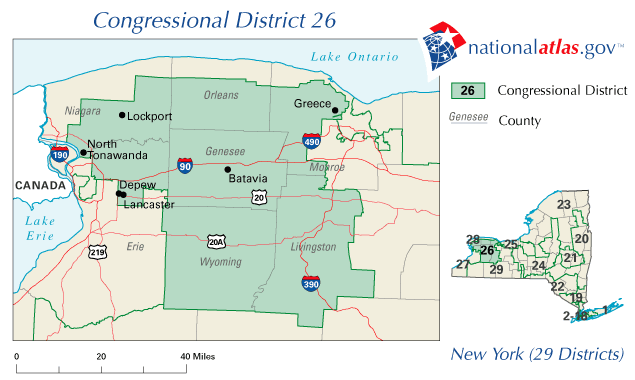
New York's 26th congressional district

Incumbent representative Chris Lee resigned on February 9, 2011, after a scandal erupted over him soliciting a woman on Craigslist. The special election was held on May 24, 2011. In an upset victory, Democrat Kathy Hochul narrowly beat Republican Assemblywoman Jane Corwin with 47% of the vote.

2011 New York's 26th congressional district special election
Party	Candidate	Votes	%
Democratic	Kathy Hochul	47,519	42.68
Working Families	Kathy Hochul	5,194	4.66
Total	Kathy Hochul	52,713	47.34
Republican	Jane Corwin	35,721	32.08
Conservative	Jane Corwin	9,090	8.16
Independence	Jane Corwin	2,376	2.13
Total	Jane Corwin	47,187	42.38
Tea Party	Jack Davis	10,029	9.01
Green	Ian Murphy	1,177	1.06
Write-in		232	0.21
Total votes		111,338	100.00
Democratic gain from Republican			

== California's 36th congressional district ==
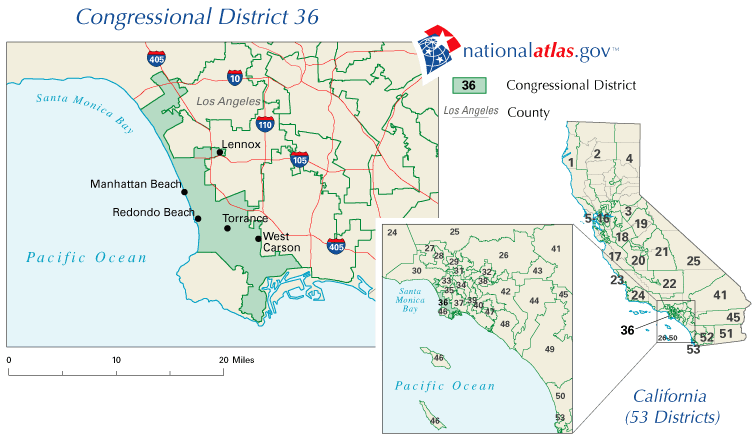
California's 36th congressional district

Jane Harman resigned on February 28, 2011, to become head of the Woodrow Wilson International Center for Scholars. The special primary election occurred on May 17, 2011. Democrat Janice Hahn received the highest number of votes, with Republican Craig Huey taking second place. Because no candidate received more than 50 percent of the vote in the primary, a special general election was held on July 12, 2011, between the top two vote recipients. The runoff election was won by Janice Hahn.

2011 California's 36th congressional district special election
Party	Candidate	Votes	%
Democratic	Janice Hahn	47,000	54.89
Republican	Craig Huey	38,624	45.11
Total votes		85,624	100.00
Democratic hold			

== Nevada's 2nd congressional district ==
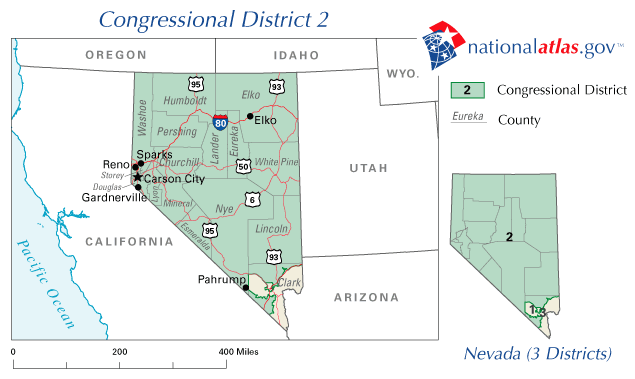
Nevada's 2nd congressional district

Incumbent representative Dean Heller resigned after being appointed to the United States Senate following the resignation of John Ensign.

Republican Mark Amodei won the election with 58% of the vote to Democrat Kate Marshall's 36%.

2011 Nevada's 2nd congressional district special election
Party	Candidate	Votes	%
Republican	Mark Amodei	75,180	57.92
Democratic	Kate Marshall	46,818	36.07
Independent	Helmuth Lehmann	5,372	4.14
Independent American	Timothy Fasano	2,421	1.87
Total votes		129,791	100.00
Republican hold			

== New York's 9th congressional district ==
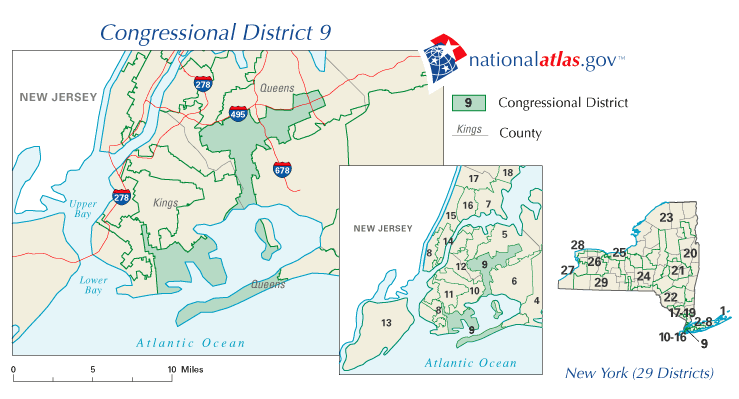
New York's 9th congressional district

Incumbent representative Anthony Weiner resigned on June 21, 2011, following a series of sexting scandals.

The special election was held on September 13, 2011. Despite the district being heavily Democratic, Republican businessman Bob Turner narrowly won against Democratic Assemblyman David Weprin by under 4,000 votes.

2011 New York's 9th congressional district special election
Party	Candidate	Votes	%
Republican	Bob Turner	32,526	45.05
Conservative	Bob Turner	4,816	6.67
Total	Bob Turner	37,342	51.72
Democratic	David Weprin	31,285	43.33
Working Families	David Weprin	1,425	1.97
Independence	David Weprin	946	1.31
Total	David Weprin	33,656	46.62
Socialist Workers	Chris Hoeppner	143	0.20
Total votes		72,197	100.00
Republican gain from Democratic			

== See also ==
- List of special elections to the United States House of Representatives
- 2010 United States Senate elections
