= Kenneth A. Ross Jr. =

American politician (1923–2004)

Member of the California State Assembly from the 66th district
- In office December 2, 1953 – January 3, 1955
- Preceded by: Gordon Hahn
- Succeeded by: Charles H. Wilson

Personal details
- Born: February 5, 1923 Santa Rosa, California, US
- Died: April 27, 2004 (aged 81) Sierra Madre, California, US
- Party: Republican
- Spouse: Betty Louise Utech (m. 1944)
- Children: 4

Military service
- Branch/service: United States Navy
- Battles/wars: World War II

Kenneth A. Ross Jr. (February 5, 1923 – April 27, 2004) served in the California State Assembly representing the 66th District from 1953 to 1955. During World War II he served in the United States Navy.
