= Bridge to Breakwater =

Not to be confused with the "From Bridge to Breakwater Master Development Plan for the San Pedro Waterfront and Promenade", a development plan for San Pedro, California. The Bridge to Breakwater was a footrace, bicycle race, and skateboard race held along the Los Angeles Harbor in San Pedro, California, that featured 12k and 5k distances. Modeled after San Francisco's "Bay to Breakers race", the race debuted on Labor Day Weekend in 2006 with over 300 people attending. Property owners

In 2007, the race was promoted and had a planned attendance of over 1,000 people. However, organizer Dave Behar failed to obtain the proper permits and insurance for the race, and was forced to shut down just hours before its scheduled start. This was despite obtaining notice from Dolores Canizales, a staff member of then city council member Janice Hahn, of what permits needed to be applied for. Behar took no action, but instead "Behar and his company, Ion Network, began promoting the event, collecting race fees, and soliciting sponsorships.". The race had to be staged informally. It was not formally held in 2008, however it continues to be walked, run and skateboarded informally every year by many local people.
