= Billy G. Mills =

American politician (1929–2026)

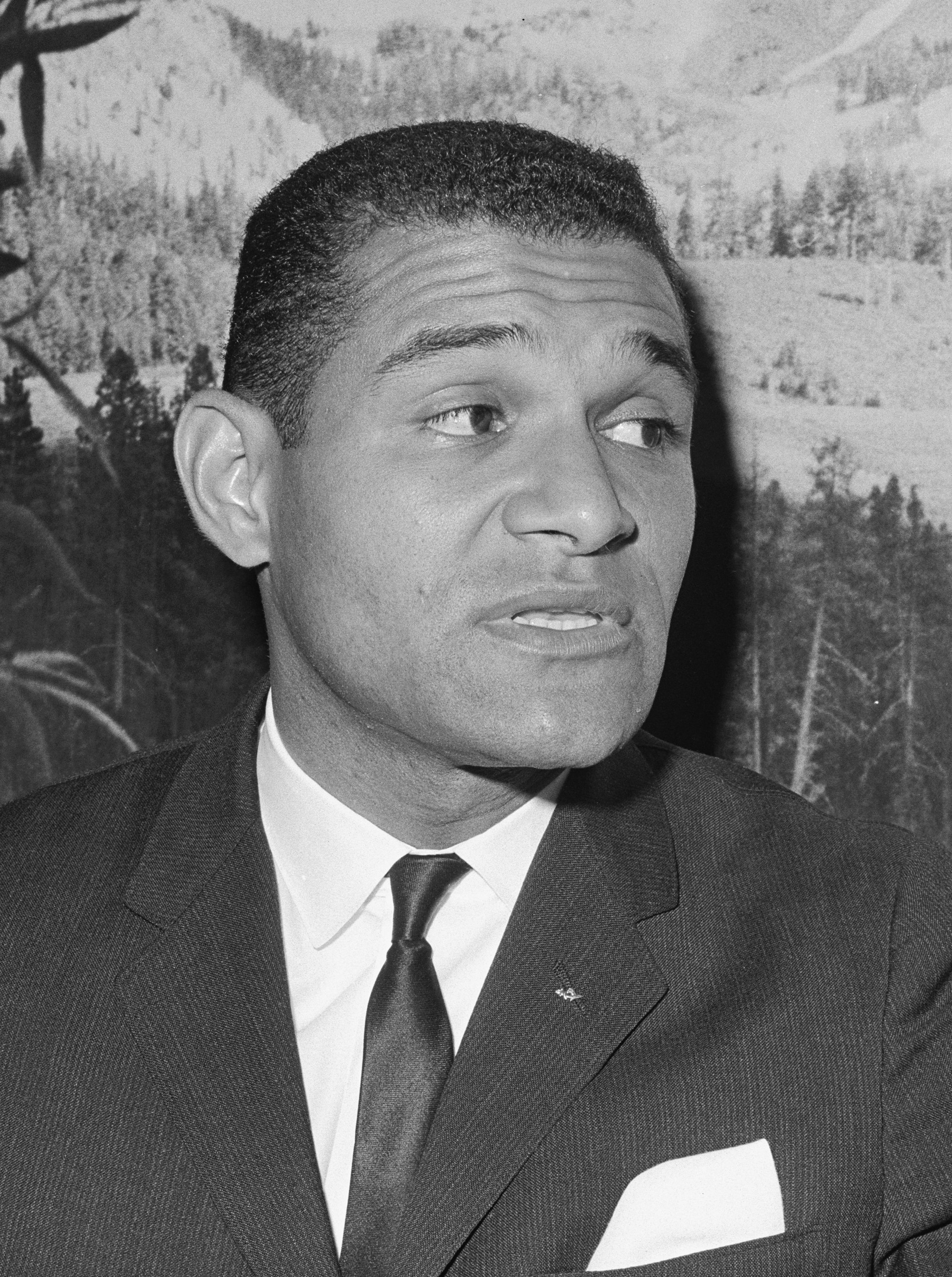
- Mills in 1963

Member of the Los Angeles City Council for the 8th district
- In office July 1, 1963 – April 11, 1974
- Preceded by: Gordon Hahn
- Succeeded by: Robert C. Farrell

Personal details
- Born: November 19, 1929 Waco, Texas, U.S.
- Died: June 27, 2026 (aged 96) Los Angeles, California, U.S.
- Party: Democratic
- Spouse: Rubye Maurine Jackson (m. 1953)

Billy Gene Mills (November 19, 1929 – June 27, 2026) was an American politician and judge. He served on the Los Angeles Superior Court, and had previously been Los Angeles City Council member, serving from 1963 to 1974. He was one of the first three African-Americans elected to the council.

== Background ==
Mills was born in Waco, Texas, on November 19, 1929, the son of Roosevelt Mills of Marshall, Texas, and Jenye Vive Mills, also of Texas. He went to A.J. Moore High School in Waco, where he was captain and quarterback of the football team. A member of the debate and declamation squad, he was named "Most Outstanding Student" in 1947. He moved to California after graduation and then received an associate in arts degree from Compton College and a Bachelor of Arts degree from UCLA in 1951. While an undergraduate, he joined the Kappa Alpha Psi fraternity. He earned a Juris Doctor degree from UCLA in 1954, and was a member of the first graduating class to complete the university's full three-year program and the first black student to receive that degree from UCLA. He spent a year working at Douglas Aircraft and then was in the Army until 1957; he was assigned to legal duties in Japan. After his discharge, he became a deputy county probation officer, and in 1960 began to practice law. He ran unsuccessfully for a municipal judgeship in 1962. He was honored by UCLA as Alumnus of the Year and as Judge of the Year by the Beverly Hills Bar Association.

On June 20, 1953, he married Rubye Maurine Jackson of Texarkana, Texas. They had twin daughters, Karen and Karol, and three sons, Wiliam Karl, John Stewart and James Edward. The children established the Dr. Rubye and Judge Billy G. Mills Scholarship at UCLA to offer graduates of LA public schools studying political science seeking financial aid.

In 1966 they were living at 3621 Third Avenue in the Jefferson Park district.

Mills died at his home in Leimert Park, Los Angeles, on June 27, 2026, at the age of 96.

== City Council ==
=== Elections ===
Mills was elected to Los Angeles City Council District 8 in 1963, succeeding Gordon Hahn. After the election, he noted that the "cheek has turned and now Caucasians will realize that you don't have to be white to represent whites."

He and Tom Bradley were the next two blacks to serve on the Los Angeles City Council, after Gilbert Lindsay, who had been appointed in the 9th District in 1962. Lindsay was elected in his own right in 1964, so the three were the first blacks to be elected to the City Council. All three were reelected in 1967 and 1971.

In 1968 Mills ran unsuccessfully for the Los Angeles County Board of Supervisors, challenging the incumbent, Kenneth Hahn.

=== Yorty ===
Even though Mills had supported Mayor Sam Yorty in the 1965 election against James Roosevelt, once Mills was elected, Yorty "bitterly assailed" the new councilman's spending on new furnishings for his City Hall and district offices. The mayor turned down Mills' "latest request—$126 for a 'reverse' telephone directory." Mills replied that his offices had been neglected in the past and there was some "catching up" to do. After Yorty vetoed additional expenditures for Mills's office three months later, Mills said of the mayor: "After many years of public office, his prejudices are beginning to show. This man's sanity is . . . in question."

=== Police ===
In April 1964 Mills maintained that he had been stopped by the police seventeen times since the preceding July because he was "spotted driving a city car at night." He declined to label the incidents as "mistreatment." Mayor Yorty said he thought that Mills's statement was "exaggerated" and that it was not factual, adding: "If he was stopped once I'd be surprised."

=== Watts riots ===
On Wednesday evening, August 11, 1965, a large-scale civil disturbance broke out in the Watts district of Los Angeles and spread within a few days to other parts of the city. Thirty -four people were killed, 1,032 injured, and 3,438 arrested. It was the most severe riot in the city's history to that time.

Mills called a meeting of community and "indigenous" leaders in the City Council chambers on Saturday morning "to hear comments from anyone connected with the disturbances so city officials can begin getting at the causes of the riots." Staff writer Paul Beck of the Los Angeles Times, reported:

Mills' decision to hold the meeting came in the face of warnings from other councilmen that it could cause serious problems and do no good in calming those involved. . . . "I can imagine the drapes being torn down and the furniture slashed," said Councilman John C. Holland."

=== Police probe ===
Mills demanded an investigation of the role of the Los Angeles Police Department in the riots and asked Mayor Yorty to issue an executive order that would prevent Chief William H. Parker and other department heads from making public statements without clearing them first with the mayor or appropriate governing boards. He said the Los Angeles police were "rendered totally inept" after the rioting had started.

On September 8, 1965, Mills "directed" Chief Parker to appear before him "in person" to explain a raid on a Black Muslim mosque the preceding August 18, in which nineteen people were arrested and all were freed by a judge, citing lack of evidence. Parker declined to comply. Mills' action, according to a news report, was "in keeping with his persistent opposition to the chief." Mills was the only council member who did not vote in favor of a council resolution commending Parker and the department for their work during the disturbances. He said he would have voted in favor if the resolution had it not named Parker and had it not "excused" the police for all their actions.

The councilman said he had information that the mosque raid was "deliberately provoked" by false phone calls that Negroes were carrying guns into the building. He was critical of heavy police gunfire and claimed that the officers "were trying to destroy" two buildings on the property. Deputy Police Chief Thomas Reddin responded that "large-scale force was necessary to overcome large-scale resistance." Mills later submitted a report suggesting that a fire set inside the mosque could have been done by police as an act of "hostility."

=== Inquests ===
Mills was critical of the coroner's inquests that were held after the riots. He said they were "attempts to justify the shooting of elderly citizens, unarmed youths and innocent bystanders." Twenty-six of the riot deaths were ruled justifiable homicide, one was accidental and five were criminal.

== Democratic Party ==
By a three-vote margin, Mills in 1966 was elected the first black chairman of the Democratic County Central Committee over fellow Councilman Tom Bradley, also an African American. After the vote, Mills called for the defeat of former movie star and television actor Ronald Reagan, who was running for governor as a Republican.

== Run for Congress ==
Mills ran unsuccessfully for Congress in 1972, losing in the primary to Yvonne Brathwaite Burke.

== Superior Court ==
On April 3, 1974, Governor Ronald Reagan appointed Mills to the Los Angeles Superior Court bench, effective immediately. Mills noted that while he had never supported Reagan politically, they had been on friendly terms for years, and Reagan had previously appointed him to the California Council on Criminal Justice in 1972. During the 1972 presidential campaign, Mills had supported Richard Nixon. His nomination to the court was notably suggested by the black caucus in the California Legislature.

During his tenure on the bench, Mills presided over numerous high-profile cases in the family law and criminal departments. He served as a judge for over two decades, becoming a respected figure in the Los Angeles judicial system for his emphasis on legal education and mentorship. Following his retirement, he and his wife established the Dr. Rubye and Judge Billy G. Mills Scholarship at UCLA to support graduates of Los Angeles public schools pursuing careers in political science and law. He was eventually honored as "Judge of the Year" by the Beverly Hills Bar Association.

Political offices
Preceded by Gordon Hahn	Los Angeles City Council; 8th District; 1963–74	Succeeded by Robert C. Farrell
Preceded by John S. Gibson Jr.	President Pro Tempore of the Los Angeles City Council; 1969–75	Succeeded by Robert Stevenson
