= Robert C. Farrell =

American politician

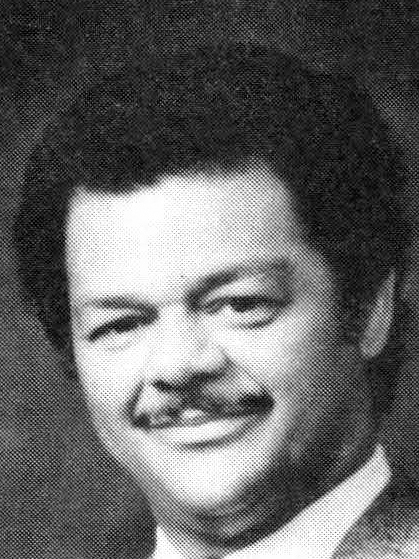
- Official portrait, 1986

Member of the Los Angeles City Council from the 8th District
- In office June 28, 1974 – June 30, 1991
- Preceded by: Billy G. Mills
- Succeeded by: Mark Ridley-Thomas

Personal details
- Born: October 1, 1936 (age 89) Natchez, Mississippi
- Party: Democratic

Robert C. Farrell (born October 1, 1936) is a politician who was a member of the Los Angeles City Council from 1974 until 1991. Previously, he was a journalist and newspaper publisher.

== Biography ==
Farrell was born in Natchez, Mississippi, on October 1, 1936, and moved with his family to New Orleans and Newark, New Jersey, before settling in Los Angeles, where he attended Los Angeles High School, graduating in 1954. He enlisted in the Navy and in 1956 was promoted to midshipman. After his service, he received a Navy scholarship to earn a Bachelor of Arts degree in Near Eastern Studies at UCLA in 1961. He returned to UCLA in 1962, where he studied journalism.

Farrell began his journalistic career as a reporter for the black-oriented California Eagle newspaper and on the Los Angeles Sentinel. He was also a correspondent for Jet magazine. In 1966 he published his own newspaper in Watts, the Star-Review. He also helped research and prepare a UCLA report on hard-core unemployment in South Los Angeles.

Farrell married Willie Mae Reese on October 30, 1965. They divorced in August 1974. There is one daughter from this union, Mia Ann Farrell. Farrell then married Essiebea L. Hayes and they were separated in April 1984. They divorced in September 1986. There is one daughter from this union, Kongit Arlicekathinia Farrell. Farrell is married to Windy Barnes-Farrell.

== Politics ==
=== Campaigns ===
Farrell's first involvement in political life was in the Johnson-Humphrey Presidential campaign of 1964, and in 1970 he was statewide black communities coordinator in John Tunney's U.S. Senate race. In 1971 he was deputy minority communities director on the national staff of George McGovern, who was seeking the Democratic presidential nomination. He next worked for Tom Bradley's mayoral campaigns.

=== City Council ===
==== Elections ====
Farrell was employed as deputy to 8th District City Councilman Billy G. Mills, and when Mills was appointed as a Superior Court judge in 1974, Farrell was elected to succeed him. In that era (1975), the district "ran in a north-south line in South-Central Los Angeles, from Adams and Jefferson Blvds. on the north, to Normandie and Central Avenue on the west, 118th St. on the south, and Arlington and Van Ness on the west." It suffered "some of the worst crime, unemployment and housing problems in the city."

Farrell served for seventeen years altogether, although he did face one recall election—in 1978—and was threatened with another ten years later.. Recall proponents criticized Farrell for "dirty streets and alleys" and a controversial remark he had made the previous year supposedly indicating disregard for the rights of senior citizens. He beat the 1978 recall threat by 9,263 votes to 5,165 The second recall attempt, in 1988, failed when not enough signatures were gathered to put the question on the ballot.

==== Positions ====
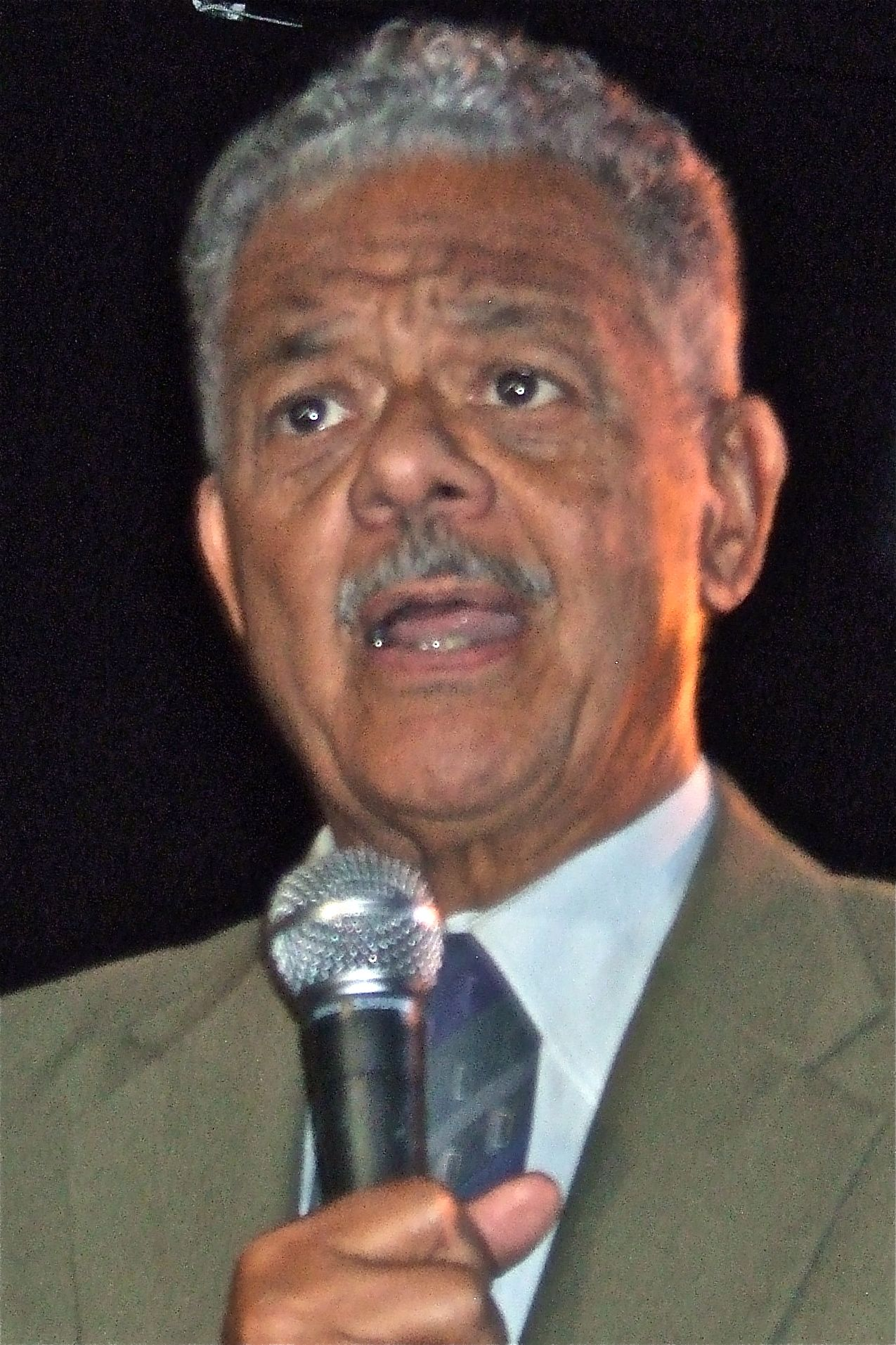
Farrell speaking at the Center for Inquiry in Los Angeles, 2012.

===== Liberal =====
Farrell was noted as a liberal who believed in an "active, interventionist role for government." This, it was said, distinguished him from other African-American council members—"Gilbert Lindsay and occasionally David Cunningham"—who relied more on the private sector in solving problems.

===== Crime =====
Farrell was insistent in pushing the Los Angeles Police Department to end what he considered racism in the department, and he urged an investigation of the controversial "choke hold" used by the police. But he also waged what was called a "personal war on crime and violence," and he said that "there is more to an anti-crime fight than law enforcement." For example, he called for an honor farm where convicted youths could earn money to compensate their victims. He thought of a municipal lottery to finance an anti-crime unit, and he advocated closing Nickerson Gardens and other crime-ridden public housing projects.

At one point, Farrell had to stand and apologize to members of the Southside Serial Killer police task force for questioning whether the "best and the brightest" had been assigned to tracking down the murderer of eighteen women in South Los Angeles between 1983 and 1985.

Farrell wrote a proposal for a special property tax that would be levied on South Los Angeles residents to pay for additional police, but after public opposition developed, he changed his mind and said he would no longer work for it, Proposition 7 on the June 1987 ballot.

===== South Africa =====
Farrell was a consistent critic of the Apartheid regime of South Africa in the 1980s, and he used his position to promote those who championed the freedom of Nelson Mandela. Farrell also played a leading role for the city of Los Angeles to divest from South Africa, and he pushed for the city to deny government contracts to corporations that had ongoing businesses in Apartheid South Africa. Upon the passage of divestiture, Farrell said "This is one where all of us are just doing ourselves and our nation and our city proud." He was subsequently thanked by Archbishop Desmond Tutu for his efforts. In 1986, Farrell accompanied Rev. Jesse Jackson and a delegation of international diplomats and elected officials on a trip to Africa to urge an end to Apartheid.

===== Other =====
Fluoridation. Farrell was among the majority of the ten City Council members who in 1974 voted in favor of fluoridating the city's water supply. Five were opposed.

Housing. The councilman stressed the need to improve existing dwellings, rather than to build new housing. "What we can count on is what we can see and what we can touch," he said in 1979.

Middle East. On a visit to Israel in 1984, Farrell warned that the expulsion of a group of African-American immigrants known as the Black Hebrews, as threatened by an official, "would produce resentment in America's black communities and would damage Israel's standing in American public opinion." Along with Compton Mayor Walter R. Tucker and three other U.S. mayors, he made a trip to Saudi Arabia in 1988, funded by the Association of Arab-American University Graduates. The trip was briefly controversial when it was erroneously reported that he had not filed the proper financial documents with the city concerning the visit.

Development. Despite the opposition of residents who claimed the project would destroy a block of historic homes in North University Park, Farrell supported and in 1987 voted for a shopping center south of Adams Boulevard between Vermont and Menlo avenues. He acknowledged that he had received "several thousand dollars" in political contributions from the developers "over the years" but denied that "defenseless homeowners" were being exploited.

==== Accusations ====
In December 1987 the Los Angeles Herald-Examiner published a series of stories that alleged Farrell improperly provided numerous public benefits to a small social service agency controlled by his wife in an apparent attempt to satisfy his alimony obligations to her (during this period Farrell and his wife, Essiebea, were in the middle of their divorce).

The first of these stories was published on December 4. These stories revealed Farrell had arranged for his wife's agency, the Improvement Association of the Eighth District (IAED), to receive a quarter of a million dollar gift of real estate from Security Pacific Bank. The bank originally notified Mayor Tom Bradley's office that it was proposing to give the property (a branch office and an adjoining parking lot in Farrell's council district) to the city. When Farrell learned of the proposal, he persuaded the bank to donate the properties instead to IAED. Shortly after that gift was completed Farrell claimed he needed a new field office to serve his constituents; he then proceeded to arrange for the city to lease the same former Security Pacific properties from IAED for this purpose. Although Farrell claimed otherwise, several city officials involved in the lease deal said Farrell never disclosed to them that the lease was with his wife's agency. The city paid IAED $2000 per month to rent the former bank building and $400-a-month for the parking lot. The Herald-Examiner investigation also discovered IAED sold the parking lot to a developer shortly after acquiring it from Security Pacific, and yet IAED continued to receive rent from the city for that property for 21 months after that sale. The day after that story appeared, IAED reimbursed the city $8,400 for the rent it had improperly received from the parking lot deal.

Other public funds went to IAED from the city, including a $50,000 federal grant approved by the City Council; Farrell was chairman of the council's grants committee at the time. Farrell also put two of Essiebea's sisters and his daughter on the City Hall payroll for different periods, and he funneled $53,500 of his campaign funds to IAED. Farrell told the Herald-Examiner: "There's no scheme....It would be foolish, absolutely foolish, for me to do that."

In the middle of this controversy, Farrell, joined by local African-American leaders, held a news conference on the First Street steps of City Hall where he claimed the "attacks" on him were part of a wider, national effort by a white-dominated media to marginalize outspoken African-American leaders like himself. During this period, a recall effort against Farrell was also ongoing, led by Farrell's own African-American constituents and fueled in part by the many disclosures about Farrell's misconduct in office.

Despite Farrell's protestations, Los Angeles County Dist. Atty. Ira Reiner opened a "review" of Farrell's conduct, as revealed in the Herald-Examiner, that eventually became a full investigation. (Also see, "DA Takes Closer Look at Farrell's Aid to Ex-Wife's Agency," Los Angeles Herald-Examiner, December 16, 1987, p. A-8).

In Feb. 1991, three years after the stories first broke, Reiner's office dropped its investigation. "Farrell's recent announcement that he would not run for his 8th District council seat in the April 9 election had no bearing on the investigation, said district attorney spokeswoman Sandi Gibbons. She declined to say whether Farrell's official actions constituted an appearance of a conflict of interest. ′We make a determination about whether the law has been violated,′ Gibbons said. ′It is up to others to make moral judgments.′"

=== State Assembly race ===
In 1990, he suffered an upset defeat when he lost to Marguerite Archie-Hudson in his bid to represent the 48th district of the California State Assembly. The seat was previously held by Maxine Waters.

Preceded by Billy G. Mills	Los Angeles City Council; 8th District; 1974–91	Succeeded by Mark Ridley-Thomas
