= Charles H. Wilson =

American politician (1917–1984)

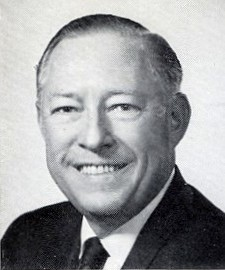
- Official portrait, 1971

Member of the U.S. House of Representatives from California's 31st district
- In office January 3, 1963 – January 3, 1981
- Preceded by: District established
- Succeeded by: Mervyn Dymally

Member of the California State Assembly from the 66th district
- In office January 3, 1955 – January 3, 1963
- Preceded by: Gordon Hahn
- Succeeded by: Joe Gonsalves

Personal details
- Born: Charles Herbert Wilson; February 15, 1917 Magna, Utah, U.S.
- Died: July 21, 1984 (aged 67) Clinton, Maryland, U.S.
- Resting place: Inglewood Park Cemetery, in Inglewood, California
- Party: Democratic
- Spouse: Hyun Ju Chang

Military service
- Branch/service: United States Army
- Battles/wars: World War II

Charles Herbert Wilson (February 15, 1917 – July 21, 1984) was a 20th-century American banker, businessman and California Democratic politician from the Los Angeles area. For nine terms he was a member of the U.S. House of Representatives from 1963 to 1981.

== Early life ==
Wilson was born in Magna, Utah, and moved with his parents in 1922 to Los Angeles, California. He attended public schools in Los Angeles and Inglewood, where he was later an employee at a bank, from 1935 to 1942.

=== World War II ===
Wilson served as a staff sergeant in the United States Army from June 1942 to December 1945, where he gained experience overseas in the European Theater of Operations.

He returned home and in 1945 opened his own insurance agency in Los Angeles.

== Political career ==
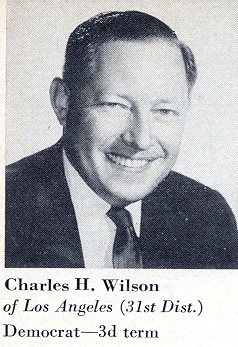
1967, Congressional Pictorial Directory

Wilson served as a member of the California State Assembly from the 66th District from 1955 to 1963.

=== Congress ===
He was elected as a Democrat to the United States House of Representatives, where he served from January 3, 1963, to January 3, 1981. On June 10, 1980, Wilson was reprimanded by the House for financial misconduct stemming from the Koreagate scandal. Wilson was defeated for renomination in 1980 by former Lieutenant Governor Mervyn M. Dymally; this loss was due in part due to the reprimand by his colleagues.

Wilson is, to date, the last white congressman to represent the 31st District.

== Death ==
Wilson resided in Tantallon, Maryland, toward the end of his life, and died in Clinton, Maryland, on July 21, 1984. He is interred at Inglewood Park Cemetery, in Inglewood, California.

== Electoral history ==
1962 United States House of Representatives elections in California
Party	Candidate	Votes	%
Democratic	Charles H. Wilson (Incumbent)	76,631	52.2
Republican	Gordon Hahn	70,154	47.8
Total votes		146,785	100.0
Democratic win (new seat)			

1964 United States House of Representatives elections in California
Party	Candidate	Votes	%
Democratic	Charles H. Wilson (Incumbent)	114,246	64.0
Republican	Norman G. Shanahan	64,256	36.0
Total votes		178,502	100.0
Democratic hold			

1966 United States House of Representatives elections in California
Party	Candidate	Votes	%
Democratic	Charles H. Wilson (Incumbent)	92,875	63.4
Republican	Norman G. Shanahan	53,708	36.6
Total votes		146,583	100.0
Democratic hold			

1968 United States House of Representatives elections in California
Party	Candidate	Votes	%
Democratic	Charles H. Wilson (Incumbent)	94,387	58.9
Republican	James R. Dunn	62,711	39.1
American Independent	Stanley L. Schulte	3,134	2.0
Total votes		160,232	100.0
Democratic hold			

1970 United States House of Representatives elections in California
Party	Candidate	Votes	%
Democratic	Charles H. Wilson (Incumbent)	102,071	73.2
Republican	Fred L. Casmir	37,416	26.8
Total votes		139,487	100.0
Democratic hold			

1972 United States House of Representatives elections in California
Party	Candidate	Votes	%
Democratic	Charles H. Wilson (Incumbent)	85,954	52.3
Republican	Ben Valentine	69,876	42.5
Peace and Freedom	Roberta Lynn Wood	8,582	5.2
Total votes		164,412	100.0
Democratic hold			

1974 United States House of Representatives elections in California
Party	Candidate	Votes	%
Democratic	Charles H. Wilson (Incumbent)	60,560	70.5
Republican	Norman A. Hodges	23,039	26.8
Peace and Freedom	William C. Taylor	2,349	2.7
Total votes		85,948	100.0
Democratic hold			

1976 United States House of Representatives elections in California
Party	Candidate	Votes	%
Democratic	Charles H. Wilson (Incumbent)	83,155	100.0
Democratic hold			

1978 United States House of Representatives elections in California
Party	Candidate	Votes	%
Democratic	Charles H. Wilson (Incumbent)	55,667	67.8
Republican	Don Grimshaw	26,490	32.2
Total votes		82,157	100.0
Democratic hold			

Democratic primary results, California's 31st congressional district, June 3, 1980
Party	Candidate	Votes	%
Democratic	Mervyn Dymally	29,916	49.1
Democratic	Mark W. Hannaford	14,512	23.8
Democratic	Charles H. Wilson (incumbent)	9,320	15.3
Democratic	Bradford E. "Happy" Henschel	4,953	8.1
Democratic	Emanuel Gary Jr.	2,239	3.7
Total votes		60,940	100.0

== See also ==
- List of federal political scandals in the United States
- List of United States representatives expelled, censured, or reprimanded
- Unification Church

California Assembly
Preceded by Gordon Hahn	Member of the California Assembly from the 66th district 1955–1963	Succeeded by Joe Gonsalves
U.S. House of Representatives
New constituency	Member of the U.S. House of Representatives from California's 31st congressional district 1963–1981	Succeeded by Mervyn M. Dymally
