= Gordon Hahn =

American politician (1919–2001)

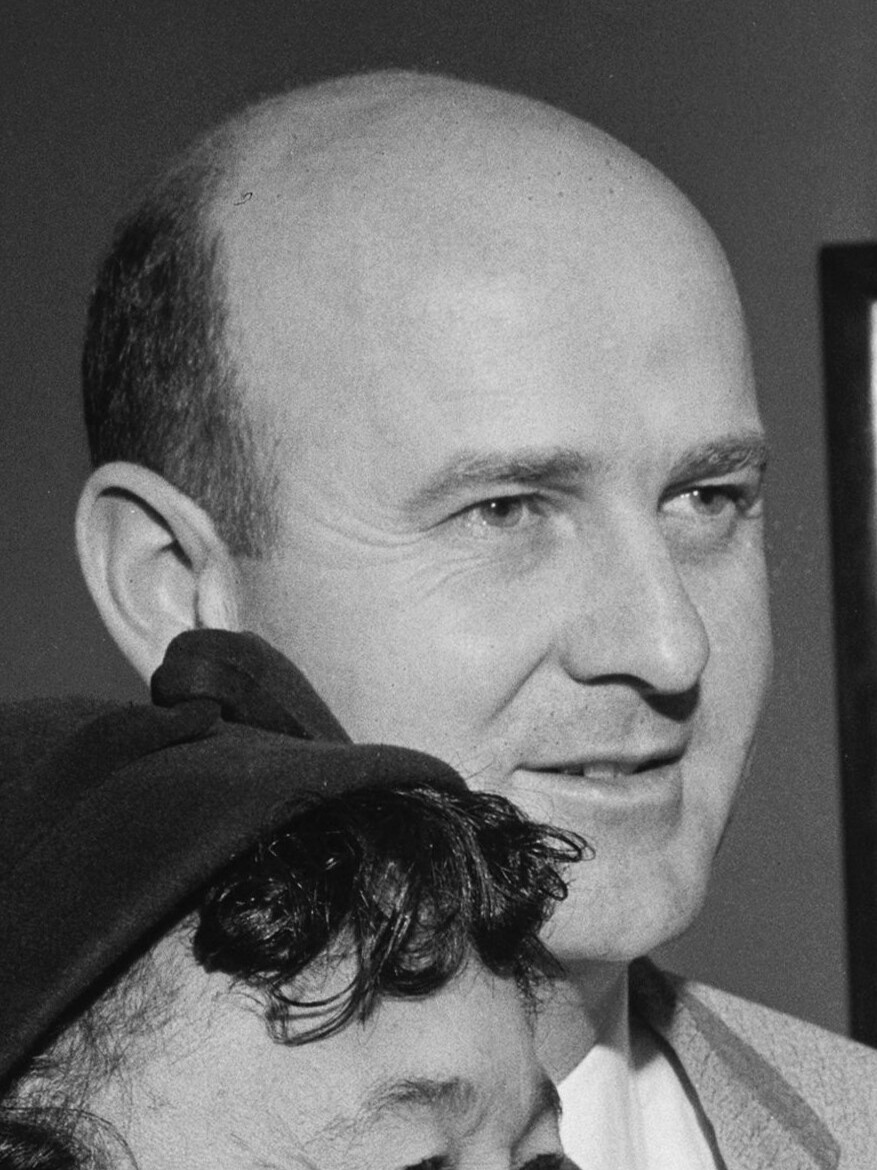
- Hahn in 1958

Member of the California State Assembly from the 66th district
- In office January 6, 1947 – June 15, 1953
- Preceded by: Jack Massion
- Succeeded by: Kenneth A. Ross Jr.

Member of the Los Angeles City Council from the 8th district
- In office June 15, 1953 – June 30, 1963
- Preceded by: Kenneth Hahn
- Succeeded by: Billy G. Mills

Personal details
- Born: April 15, 1919 Kindersley, Saskatchewan, Canada
- Died: March 29, 2001 (aged 81)
- Party: Republican
- Spouse: Donna Louise Hahn
- Relatives: Kenneth Hahn (brother); James Hahn (nephew); Janice Hahn (niece)
- Education: Pepperdine University; United States Merchant Marine Academy

Military service
- Branch/service: United States Navy Reserve
- Battles/wars: World War II

Gordon Ryerson Hahn (April 15, 1919 – March 29, 2001) was a member of the Los Angeles City Council and California State Assembly in the mid-20th Century.

While on the council, he cast the decisive vote that brought the Brooklyn Dodgers to Los Angeles and was instrumental in the appointment of Gilbert Lindsay, who became the first African American on the city council.

His brother, Kenneth Hahn, was Los Angeles County supervisor for 40 years. After Kenneth suffered a stroke in 1987, Gordon was his field deputy until Kenneth retired in 1992.

== Biography ==
Hahn was born in Kindersley, Saskatchewan, the sixth of the seven children of John and Hattie (Wiggins) Hahn. The family moved to a small house on Flower Street in Los Angeles when Gordon was an infant. His father died shortly afterward, leaving his mother to raise the large family on a $60-per-month pension. Gordon's younger brother, Kenneth, was born soon after their father's death.

Gordon Hahn worked his way through Pepperdine University and graduated from the United States Merchant Marine Academy, and was a Naval Reserve officer during World War II.

After leaving office, he worked in the real estate business. He died of pneumonia caused by respiratory failure on March 29, 2001. Hahn was buried in Riverside National Cemetery in Riverside, California.

== Political career ==
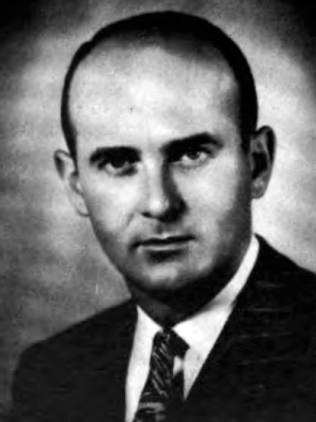
Hahn as a Assemblymember in 1950.

=== Assembly ===
In 1946, at the age of 27, he was elected as a Republican in the 66th District of the California State Assembly, becoming the youngest legislator in a decade. He served three and a half terms in the Assembly, from 1947 until his resignation in 1953.

=== City Council ===
Hahn was appointed to fill the Los Angeles City Council District 8 seat vacated by his brother, Kenneth, who had been elected to the Los Angeles County Board of Supervisors. Gordon was elected to the council in his own right after the expiration of his brother's term and served on the council until 1963.

In 1955 District 8 included an area ". . . bordering on Huntington Park and Vernon, from Vernon Avenue to 94th Street. . . . A considerable percentage of the population is Negro; they hold that their race should have some representation in the City Council. On the other hand, left-wing Democrats, following the banner of Rep. Jimmy Roosevelt, also have a candidate in the race, which may split the Negro vote."

While he was on the council he chaired the Revenue and Taxation Committee. During an eight-day smog blanket over Los Angeles in 1954, Hahn told the Associated Press, "this thing has gone far enough, health should come before industry."

=== Other contests ===
He ran to represent California's 31st District in the U.S. House of Representatives in 1962, losing to Democrat Charles H. Wilson, 48 percent to 52 percent. In 1986, he made an unsuccessful bid for Los Angeles County Assessor.

== See also ==
- Hahn family of California
- History of the Los Angeles Dodgers
- History of the Brooklyn Dodgers

Political offices
Preceded by Kenneth Hahn	Los Angeles City Council; 8th District; 1953–63	Succeeded by Billy G. Mills
Preceded by Jack Massion	California Assembly; 66th District; January 6, 1947 - June 15, 1953	Succeeded by Kenneth A. Ross Jr.
