= James Hahn =

American lawyer and politician

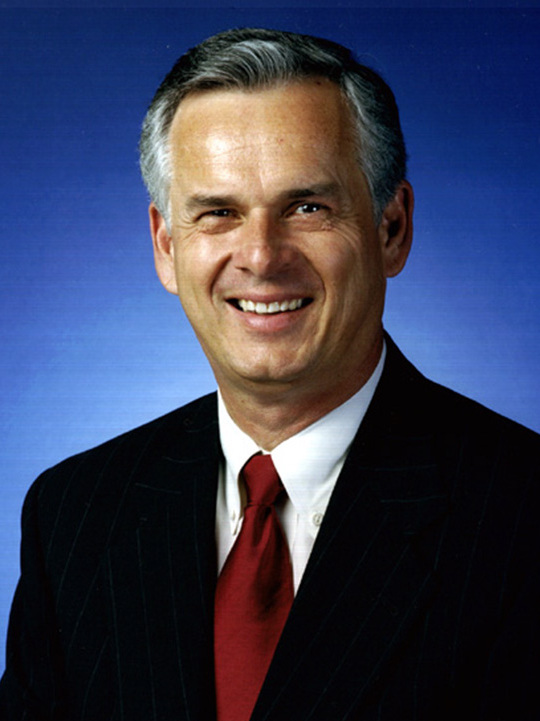
- Official portrait, 2003

Judge of the Los Angeles County Superior Court
- Incumbent
- Assumed office November 5, 2008
- Appointed by: Arnold Schwarzenegger

40th Mayor of Los Angeles
- In office July 1, 2001 – July 1, 2005
- Preceded by: Richard Riordan
- Succeeded by: Antonio Villaraigosa

39th Los Angeles City Attorney
- In office July 1, 1985 – July 1, 2001
- Preceded by: Ira Reiner
- Succeeded by: Rocky Delgadillo

5th City Controller of Los Angeles
- In office July 1, 1981 – July 1, 1985
- Preceded by: Ira Reiner
- Succeeded by: Rick Tuttle

Personal details
- Born: James Kenneth Hahn; July 3, 1950 (age 76) Los Angeles, California, U.S.
- Party: Democratic
- Spouse: Monica Hahn (m. 1983; sep. 2003) Michelle L. Fleenor (m. 2009)
- Relations: Janice Hahn (sister); Gordon Hahn (uncle)
- Children: 2
- Parent: Kenneth Hahn (father)
- Education: Pepperdine University (BA, JD)

James Kenneth Hahn (born July 3, 1950) is a Los Angeles Superior Court judge and an American former lawyer and politician. A Democrat, Hahn was elected the 40th mayor of Los Angeles in 2001. He served until 2005, at which time he was defeated in his bid for re-election. Prior to his term as Mayor, Hahn served in several other capacities for the city of Los Angeles, including deputy city attorney (1975–1979), city controller (1981–1985) and city attorney (1985–2001). Hahn is the only individual in the city's history to have been elected to all three citywide offices. He is currently a sitting judge on the Los Angeles County Superior Court.

As Mayor, Hahn appointed Bill Bratton, the former NYPD Commissioner, as Chief of the Los Angeles Police Department, opting not to renew Bernard Parks' second term as chief. Bratton's appointment is widely seen as leading to the sharp declines in Los Angeles' crime rate and improved morale in the department. Hahn also led the successful campaign to defeat secession in the San Fernando Valley, Hollywood, and San Pedro, thereby keeping Los Angeles intact. While he is noted primarily for these two accomplishments, they also helped lead to his unsuccessful re-election bid; African Americans upset at Parks' ousting and San Fernando Valley residents disappointed with the secession verdict had been the two constituencies that had propelled him to victory four years earlier in 2001.

A member of the Hahn family of California, he is the brother of Los Angeles County Supervisor and former Congresswoman Janice Hahn, the nephew of former California State Assemblyman and Los Angeles City Councilman Gordon Hahn and the son of former Los Angeles City Councilman and long-time Los Angeles County Supervisor Kenneth Hahn.

== Early life ==
Hahn was born on July 3, 1950, in Los Angeles, the son of Ramona (Fox) and Kenneth Hahn, and was raised in the Morningside Park district of Inglewood near South Los Angeles. Hahn attended Manchester Avenue Elementary School, Daniel Freeman Elementary School, Horace Mann Junior High School, and Los Angeles Lutheran High School.

He graduated from the Los Angeles campus of Pepperdine University in California magna cum laude with a bachelor's degree in English and a minor in journalism in 1972. He received his Juris Doctor (J.D.) degree from the Pepperdine University School of Law in 1975. In 1994, he was selected as the School of Law's distinguished alumnus. While in college, he assisted in the development of a paralegal program for the Family Law Center of the Legal Aid Society and during law school, he clerked for the Los Angeles district attorney's office.

Upon graduation in 1975 until 1979, Hahn worked as a prosecutor and deputy city attorney in the Office of the City Attorney. From 1979 to 1981, he was in private practice with Robert Horner.

== City controller ==
In 1981, Hahn was elected the fifth City Controller of Los Angeles and served until 1985. Elected at the age of 30 and sworn in two days before his 31st birthday, Hahn is the youngest person ever elected to that position.

== City attorney ==
Hahn served from 1985 to 2001 as Los Angeles City Attorney, overseeing one of the largest public law offices in the nation with approximately 450 attorneys. As City Attorney, he worked to rid LA's neighborhoods of gang activity through the use of gang injunctions. He was involved in crafting state legislation regarding gang enforcement known as the Street Terrorism Enforcement and Prevention Act. During Hahn's tenure, he led the litigation to stop the Joe Camel ad campaign and reached a settlement of 312 million dollars for the city. He used those funds to create the Tobacco Enforcement Project to prevent the sale of tobacco to minors. Hahn re-established the domestic violence unit and sponsored over 30 pieces of relevant state legislation, helping to shape California's domestic violence laws.

== Mayor ==
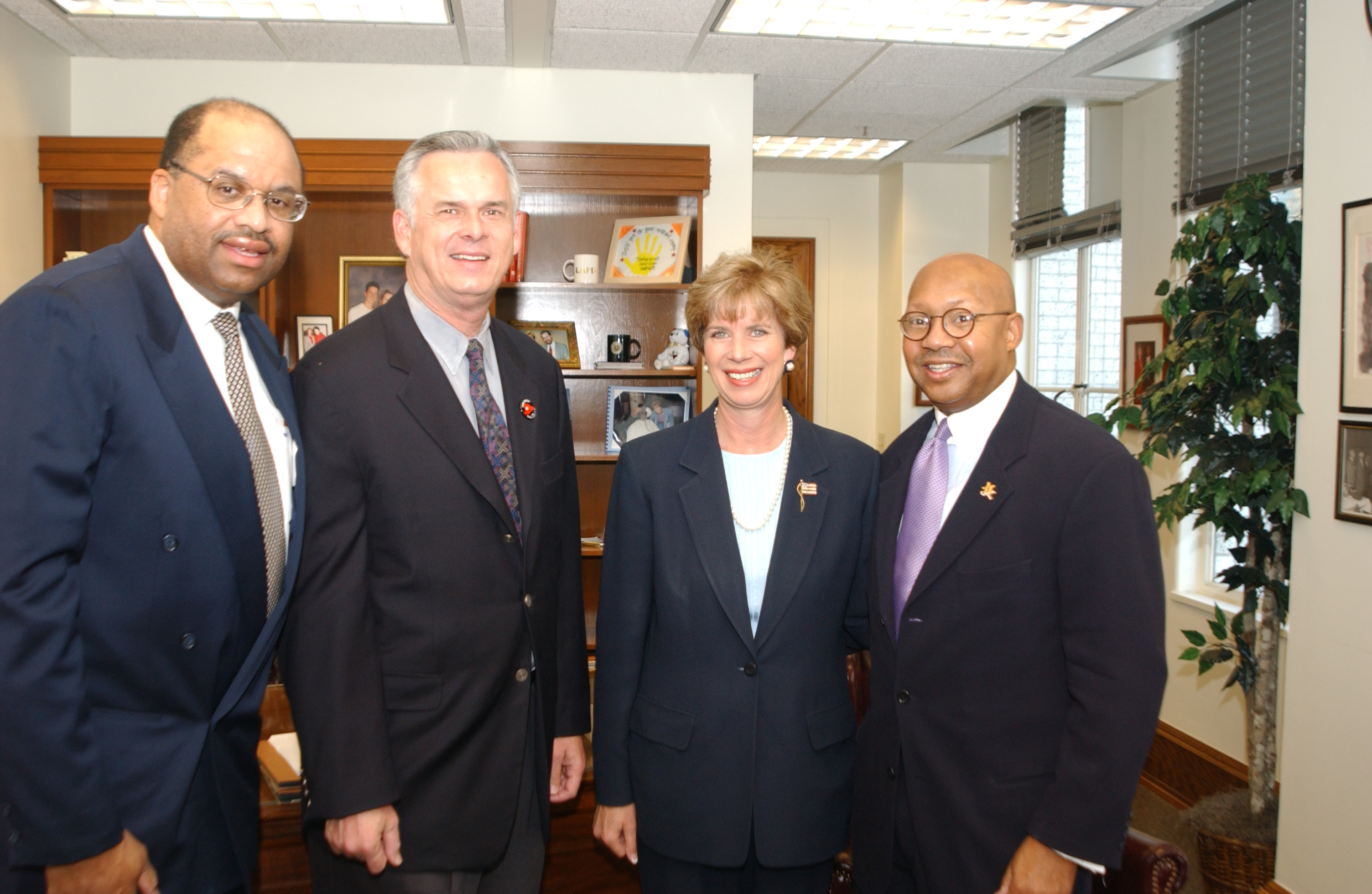
Hahn with his sister Janice and Secretary of Housing Alphonso Jackson in 2002.

Hahn was elected in 2001, defeating Antonio Villaraigosa to serve as the 40th mayor of Los Angeles.

=== Homeland security and public safety ===
In 2002, Mayor Hahn rejected Bernard Parks for a second term as Los Angeles police chief and appointed former NYPD Commissioner William Bratton to the position. Together with Bratton, he reinstated the community policing program, introduced the COMPSTAT system to better track crime, implemented a flexible work week schedule for officers, and streamlined LAPD's hiring process, all part of a broader effort to increase the recruitment and retention of officers. As a result, the LAPD experienced an increase in its ranks, morale significantly rose throughout the department and all areas of crime dropped steadily.

Mayor Hahn provided funding to ensure the presence of at least one ambulance in every fire station throughout the city. In the aftermath of the terrorist attacks of September 11, 2001, the United States Conference of Mayors appointed Hahn to serve as chair of its aviation security task force, in which he assisted in the passage of a federal aviation security bill. To better prepare the city for future emergencies, Hahn convened a Homeland Security cabinet in his office, coordinated Los Angeles' "Operation Archangel" to protect its infrastructure and lobbied for state and federal public safety grants.

=== Secession, city services and community engagement ===
Mayor Hahn led the successful efforts to defeat secession in the San Fernando Valley, Hollywood, and San Pedro, effectively keeping the city together. He followed up with a program called "Teamwork LA" to bring government closer to the people, which among other initiatives, created seven neighborhood City Halls throughout the city and launched the city's 24/7 non-emergency phone line 311.

He also championed the city's neighborhood councils system which was approved by the City Council just before he became Mayor in May 2001; over eighty councils were certified during his time in office. Hahn implemented priority based budgeting to include neighborhood councils in the budget process, providing each council with $50,000 for any purpose and an additional $100,000 for street and sidewalk improvements.

With Councilman Eric Garcetti, Hahn created the Mayor's Office of Immigrant Affairs to engage immigrants in civic life. The office was disbanded during the tenure of Mayor Antonio Villaraigosa but revived when Garcetti became Mayor.

=== Economic development, housing and homelessness ===
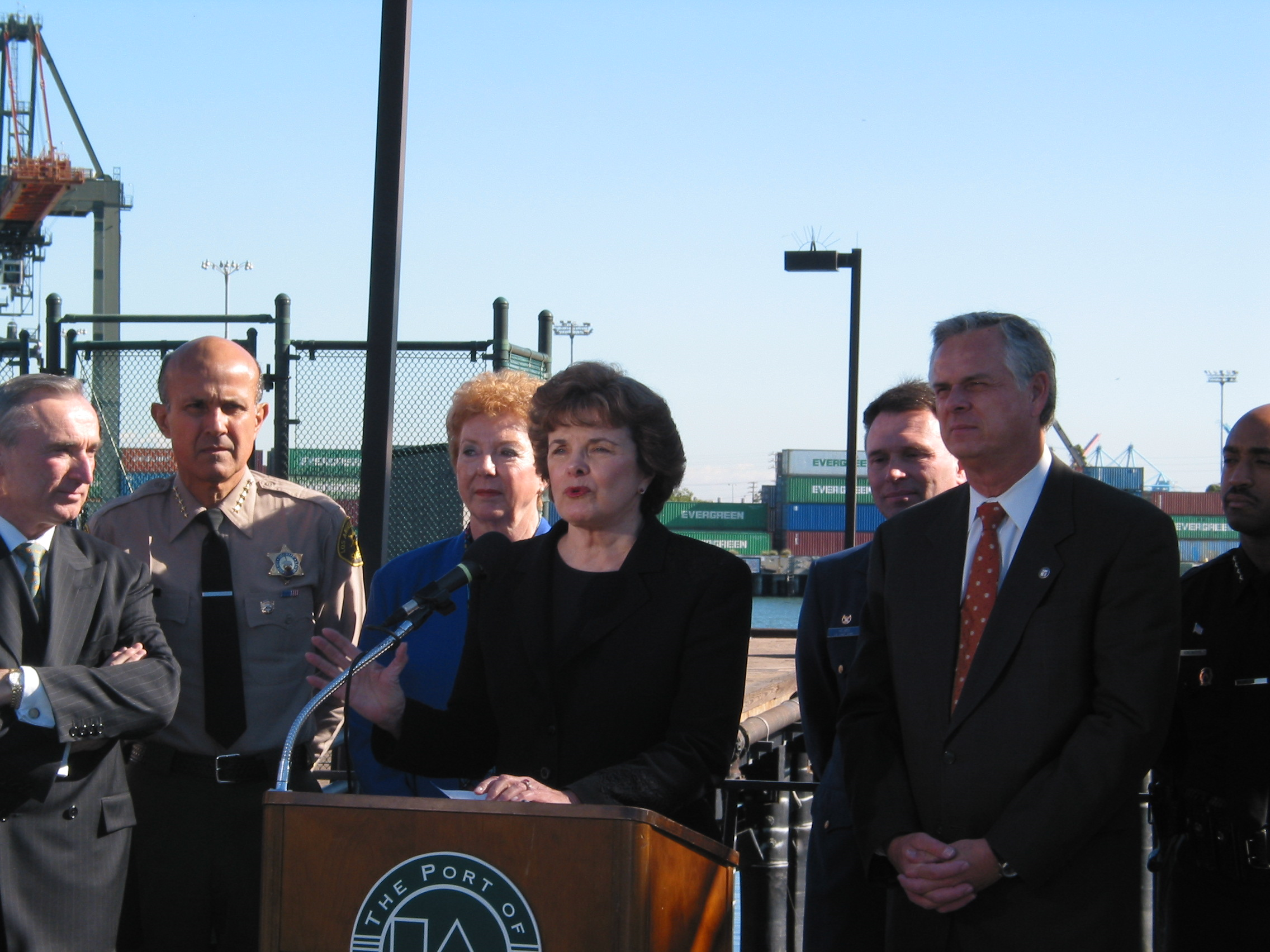
Hahn with U.S. Senator Dianne Feinstein at the Port of Los Angeles.

Mayor Hahn created a $100 million affordable housing trust fund, which was at the time the nation's largest, and expanded the adaptive reuse ordinance to convert dilapidated buildings into mixed-use residential properties. He identified the funding to keep the city's homeless shelters open year-round and met with civic leaders across the county to establish a blue ribbon commission called "Bring LA Home" to end homelessness in Los Angeles County within a decade. He also worked with City Councilmembers Wendy Greuel and Eric Garcetti to initiate and sign into law seven business tax reforms, eliminating the business tax for businesses with gross receipts of $100,000 or less, and gradually reducing the tax by 15% for all other businesses.

Hahn led two trade missions as Mayor, the first to Mexico in 2001, and the second to Asia in 2002, where he visited Japan, China, South Korea and Taiwan. In Mexico, Hahn met with Mexican President Vicente Fox, Mexican business and airline executives, and received an airport security briefing at Mexico City's Mexico City International Airport. He announced agreements with AeroMexico Airlines to expand service out of Ontario International Airport, providing a more regional approach to air service in the Los Angeles area, and with supermarket chain Grupo Gigante to open five new stores in Los Angeles creating 1,000 new jobs.

In Beijing, Hahn reached an agreement concerning the upcoming 2008 Olympics, designating Los Angeles as gateway to Beijing and enabling Los Angeles firms to be hired to oversee the renovation and construction of the Beijing airport and other infrastructure projects. In an effort to regain tourism lost after September 11, Hahn launched the "See My LA" program in Tokyo with Arnold Schwarzenegger and Los Angeles Dodgers' Kazuhisa Ishii and partnered with Korean soccer star Hong Myung-bo to boost Korean tourism to Los Angeles. Other agreements made the Los Angeles Zoo the first in the United States to exhibit a pair of Chinese golden monkeys, regionalized air service by shifting Taiwan-based EVA Airlines' operations to Ontario International Airport, and improved air quality by plugging more Asian cargo ships into natural power while docked at the Port of Los Angeles.

=== Education, workforce development, youth and families ===
Mayor Hahn partnered with the Los Angeles Unified School District to expedite the construction of new campuses to relieve overcrowding and worked to create joint-use partnerships with the district so that schools become the central focus of their respective neighborhoods.

The Mayor led a major expansion of the after school program for elementary school students, "LA's Best," to 52 more elementary schools, serving an additional 5,500 students, bringing the total to more than 20,000.

Hahn launched the Literacy@Work program to train LA's workforce after a study he commissioned identified fifty-three percent of working-age Los Angeles County residents had trouble reading street signs or bus schedules, filling out job applications in English or understanding a utility bill and the One City One Book program "One Book, One City LA," a citywide reading initiative anchored by a book selected by the Mayor. Choices included Ray Bradbury's Fahrenheit 451 in 2002, Sandra Cisneros' House on Mango Street in 2003, and Laura Hillenbrand's Seabiscuit in 2004.

Hahn also created the Free Cash for College program, to assist more low income high school seniors secure financial aid for college.

=== Energy and the environment ===
As Mayor, Hahn canceled the Los Angeles Department of Water and Power's proposed investment of up to $400 million in a coal-fired electricity plant in Utah, instead saying those resources should meet his goal of increasing's the city's use of renewable energy from three percent to twenty percent by 2017. He later endorsed a goal of specifically generating one percent of the city's electricity from solar power by 2017.

Hahn began the transition of the city's fleet of vehicles to hybrid vehicles and created the Alternative Maritime Power program at the Port of Los Angeles to enable large cruise and cargo ships to plug into clean power while docked at the port. The Mayor also pledged to make Los Angeles a landfill free city by 2006.

=== Transportation ===
The Mayor's Traffic Safety and Congestion Relief plan targeted improvements to the city's worst twenty-five intersections each year and his Street Smart program made improvements to 35 of the city's busiest thoroughfares.

After negotiating an agreement with City Councilmember Cindy Miscikowski, Hahn passed a $9 billion modernization plan for Los Angeles International Airport to both increase the number of annual passengers and make the airport more secure post-September 11.

== Family ==
Hahn is from a family of politicians. His father, Kenneth Hahn served as an LA City Councilman and as an LA County Supervisor for 40 years. Hahn's uncle, Gordon Hahn was a state assemblyman and an LA City Councilman and another uncle, John Hahn, was assistant county clerk. His cousin, Dale Hahn, is a Superior Court judge in San Mateo County. His sister, Janice Hahn, represented the 15th District of the Los Angeles City Council, served in Congress, and now sits on the Los Angeles County Board of Supervisors.

== Post-mayoral career ==
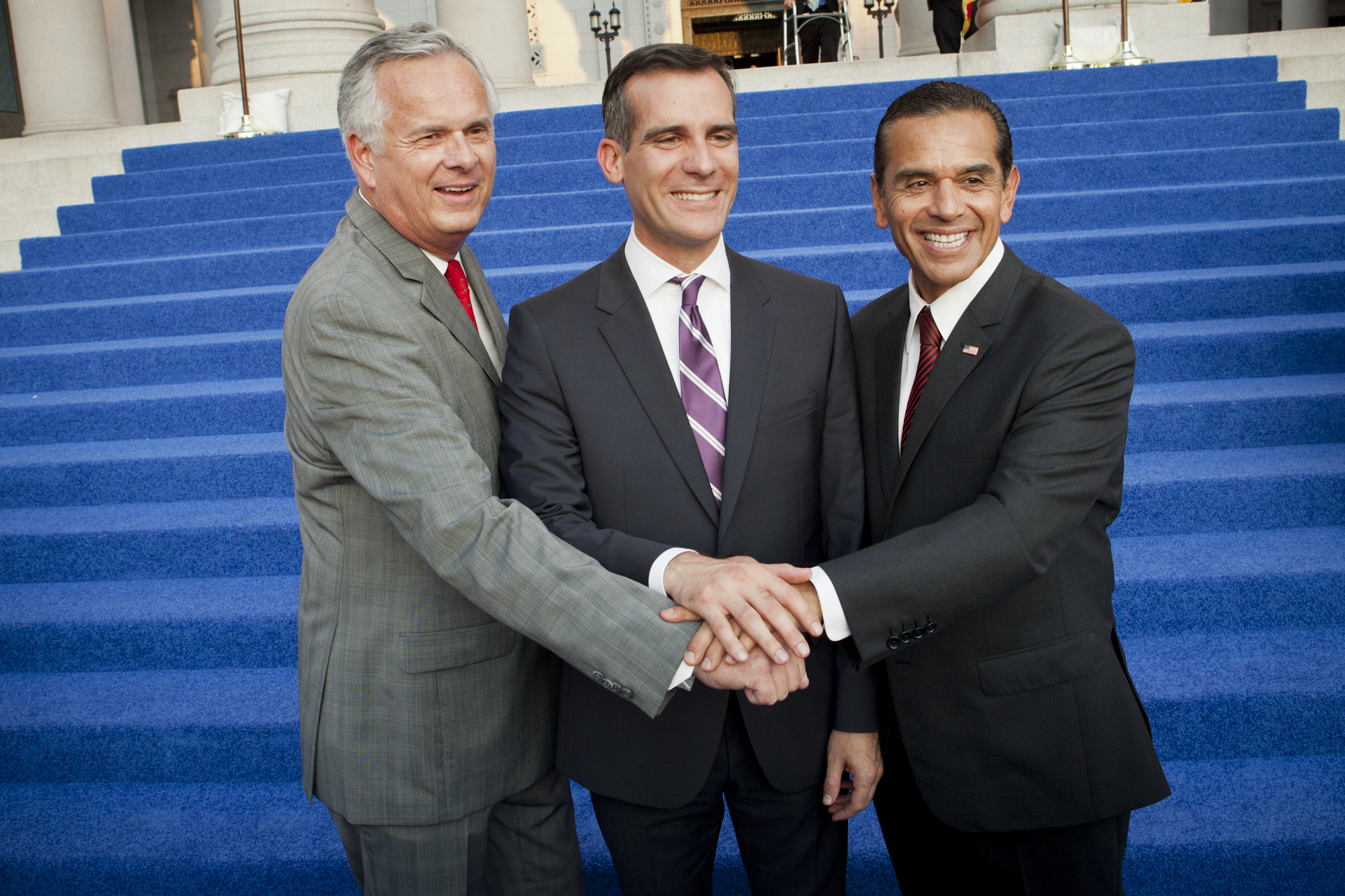
Hahn with newly elected Mayor Eric Garcetti and outgoing Mayor Antonio Villaraigosa in 2013.

After leaving office, Hahn accepted the position of a managing director and partner at the firm Chadwick Saylor & Company, a Los Angeles-based investment banking firm. On March 1, 2006, Hahn was announced as CEO of Los Angeles Development Partners, L.P., an $800 million fund launched by Chadwick Saylor & Company intended to help create affordable housing and other developments around transportation hubs such as rail stations. Hahn left the company at the beginning of 2008, according to trade publication Real Estate Alert and joined private conflict resolution provider Alternative Resolution Centers, LLC's panel of neutrals.

On October 19, 2005, Hahn took part in a discussion entitled "The State of Los Angeles", sponsored by a non-profit organization called "Days of Dialogue". The other panelists were former Mayor Richard Riordan and current Mayor, at that time, Antonio Villaraigosa, the only other living mayors. "Days of Dialogue" was founded after the notorious O. J. Simpson trial in order to encourage discussions on key issues in the Los Angeles region.

On December 12, 2005, Hahn delivered a eulogy at the funeral of longtime city councilman Marvin Braude.

On September 20, 2006, more than a year after leaving office, a Steve Lopez column ran in the Los Angeles Times explaining Hahn's new life in the private sector. Hahn said that he is now as happy as ever and for the first time in decades, can truly enjoy his city. He gets to spend more time with his son and daughter and has been in a steady relationship with a woman for over a year. He also enjoys his new work getting unions to invest money in local projects around transit lines to relieve traffic and smog.

On November 8, 2007, Hahn's official portrait was displayed in the Hall of Mayors Portrait Gallery on the 26th floor of City Hall. The event was accompanied by ceremonies on the 26th floor as well as before the City Council.

In May 2008, Hahn said that he had submitted paperwork requisite for the pursuit of a judicial appointment by California Governor Arnold Schwarzenegger. Noting that he found himself missing public service, Hahn said he'd also spoken personally to the governor about his interest in becoming a judge. On November 5, 2008, Schwarzenegger appointed Hahn to fill a vacant judgeship in the Los Angeles County Superior Court. Hahn presently presides over Traffic Court cases in Santa Monica.

In 2013, Hahn joined Mayor Eric Garcetti and former Mayors Richard Riordan and Antonio Villaraigosa at the opening of the renovated Tom Bradley International Terminal at Los Angeles International Airport, where Garcetti honored them for their efforts to revamp the airport.

In 2014, Los Angeles City Hall East, which houses the offices of the Los Angeles City Controller and Los Angeles City Attorney, two positions Hahn held, was renamed as the James K. Hahn City Hall East building.

In 2017, Hahn again joined former Mayors Richard Riordan and Antonio Villaraigosa for a moderated conversation as part of the University of California, Los Angeles's "Why History Matters" series.

Political offices
Preceded by Richard Riordan	Mayor of Los Angeles; July 1, 2001 – July 1, 2005	Succeeded by Antonio Villaraigosa
Preceded by Ira Reiner	City Attorney of Los Angeles, California; July 1, 1985 – July 1, 2001	Succeeded by Rocky Delgadillo
Preceded by Ira Reiner	City Controller of Los Angeles, California; July 1, 1981 – July 1, 1985	Succeeded by Rick Tuttle
