= Mike Gin =

American politician

Michael A. Gin (甄榮峰) is an American politician who served as mayor of Redondo Beach, California and was a Republican candidate in the special election to fill the seat in California's 36th congressional district left vacant by the resignation of Jane Harman.

== Early life ==
Gin was born in the South Bay region of Los Angeles, California to Chinese American parents.

Gin earned a Bachelor of Science degree in computer science from the University of Southern California in 1984. In 2007, Gin completed Harvard University's John F. Kennedy School of Government program for Senior Executives in State and Local Government as a David Bohnett LGBTQ Victory Institute Leadership Fellow.

== Career ==
Gin served on the Redondo Beach City Council from 1995 to 2003. In May 2005, he was elected mayor of Redondo Beach after receiving 61% of the vote in a runoff election against councilman and fellow Republican Gerard Bisignano. Gin faced no opposition during his mayoral re-election bid in March 2009.

On March 1, 2011, Gin announced that he would be a candidate in the special election to fill the seat in California's 36th congressional district left vacant by the resignation of Jane Harman. He finished fifth in the May 17, 2011 primary election.

== Personal ==
Gin and his husband, Christopher Kreidel, married in California in 2008.
