= 2011 California's 36th congressional district special election =

- July 12, 2011
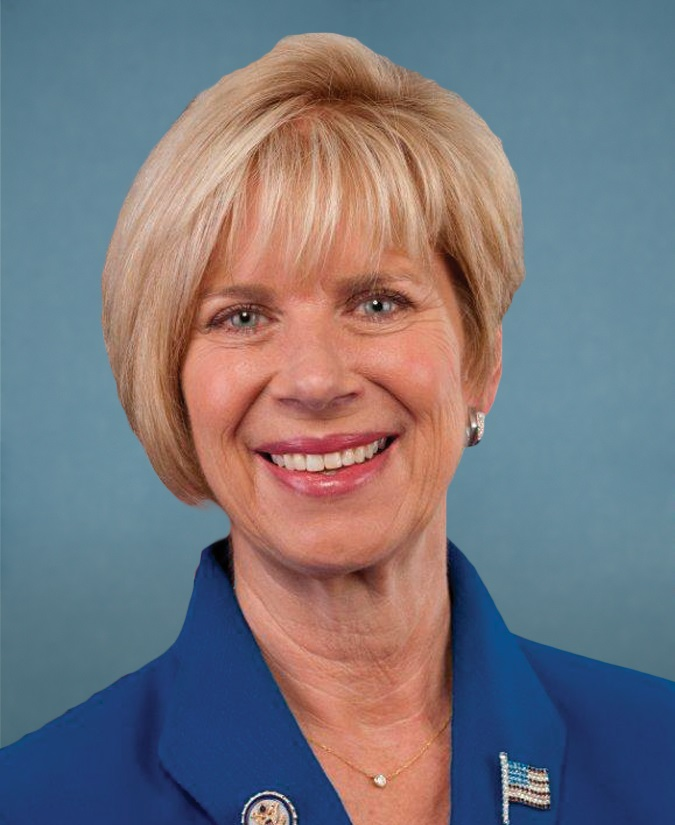

Nominee	Janice Hahn	Craig Huey
Party	Democratic	Republican
Popular vote	47,000	38,624
Percentage	54.9%	45.1%
Representative before election
Jane Harman
Democratic
Elected Representative
Janice Hahn
Democratic

A 2011 special election filled the vacancy in California's 36th congressional district after the resignation of incumbent Jane Harman on February 28, 2011; Harman vacated her seat in the U.S. House of Representatives to become head of the Woodrow Wilson International Center for Scholars.

The special primary election occurred on May 17, 2011. Democrat Janice Hahn received the highest number of votes, with Republican Craig Huey taking second place. Because no candidate received more than 50 percent of the vote in the primary, a special general election was held on July 12, 2011, between the top two vote recipients. The runoff election was won by Janice Hahn.

== Background and procedures ==
An election was called to fill the rest of Harman's term, which ends January 2013. An all-party primary was held on May 17. Since no candidate received more than 50% of the vote, the top two primary finishers, regardless of party, met in a run-off on July 12.

The special election was held under California statutes regarding special elections and not under California's newly in force Proposition 14, which does not apply to special elections.

== Candidates in the general election ==
- Janice Hahn, Democratic Party
- Craig Huey, Republican Party

== Candidates in the primaries ==
=== Democratic Party ===
- Dan Adler, businessman from Los Angeles
- Debra Bowen, Secretary of State of California from Marina Del Rey
- Loraine Goodwin, physician/arbitrator/teacher
- Janice Hahn, Los Angeles City Councilwoman from San Pedro
- Marcy Winograd, teacher and community organizer from Venice

=== Republican Party ===
- Kit Bobko, Hermosa Beach City Councilman and former Mayor
- Stephen Eisele, Marina del Rey businessman
- Mike Gin, Redondo Beach Mayor
- Craig Huey, Rolling Hills Estates businessman
- George Newberry, businessman
- Mike Webb, Redondo Beach City Attorney

=== Peace and Freedom Party ===
- Maria E. Montaño, teacher

=== Libertarian Party ===
- Steve Collett, certified public accountant

=== Independent ===
- Michael T. Chamness, consultant
- Katherine Pilot, longshore office clerk
- Matthew Roozee, executive at 20th Century Fox

== Polling ==
=== Primary election ===
Poll source	Date(s) administered	Sample size	Margin of error	Debra Bowen (D)	Mike Gin (R)	Janice Hahn (D)	Marcy Winograd (D)	Undecided
Feldman Group •	April 4–7, 2011	401	± 4.9%	20%	8%	20%	6%	24%

- • Commissioned by the Bowen campaign

=== General election ===
==== Polling ====
Poll source	Date(s) administered	Sample size	Margin of error	Janice Hahn (D)	Craig Huey (R)	Other	Undecided
Public Policy Polling ^{+}	July 8–10, 2011	619	± 3.9%	52%	44%	—	4%

- ^{+} Commissioned by Daily Kos and the SEIU
Hypothetical polling

==== Bowen/Hahn runoff ====
Poll source	Date(s) administered	Sample size	Margin of error	Debra Bowen (D)	Janice Hahn (D)	Undecided
Feldman Group •	April 4–7, 2011	401	± 4.9%	40%	36%	16%
Public Policy Polling ^{+}	February 17–18, 2011	890	± 3.3%	33%	29%	39%

- • Commissioned by the Bowen campaign
- ^{+} Commissioned by the Progressive Change Campaign Committee

== Results ==
=== Primary ===
California's 36th congressional district special primary, 2011
Party	Candidate	Votes	%
Democratic	Janice Hahn	15,647	24.6
Republican	Craig Huey	14,116	22.2
Democratic	Debra Bowen	13,407	21.1
Democratic	Marcy Winograd	5,905	9.3
Republican	Mike Gin	4,997	7.9
Republican	Mike Webb	3,895	6.1
Republican	Kit Bobko	2,296	3.6
Libertarian	Steve Collett	896	1.4
Republican	Stephen Eisele	788	1.2
Democratic	Dan Adler	361	0.6
Democratic	Loraine Goodwin	325	0.5
Peace and Freedom	Maria E. Montano	324	0.5
Republican	George Newberry	234	0.4
Independent	Matthew Roozee	157	0.2
Independent	Katherine Pilot	126	0.2
Independent	Michael T. Chamness	108	0.2
Total votes		63,582	100.0

=== General ===
California's 36th congressional district special general, 2011
Party	Candidate	Votes	%
Democratic	Janice Hahn	47,000	54.9
Republican	Craig Huey	38,624	45.1
Total votes		85,624	100.0
Turnout			25.0
Democratic hold			

== See also ==
- 2011 United States House of Representatives elections
