= Kenneth Hahn =

American politician (1920–1997)

- Hahn in 1960

Chair of Los Angeles County
- In office December 6, 1977 – December 5, 1978
- Preceded by: Baxter Ward
- Succeeded by: Peter F. Schabarum
- In office December 4, 1979 – December 2, 1980
- Preceded by: Peter F. Schabarum
- Succeeded by: Edmund D. Edelman

Member of the Los Angeles County Board of Supervisors from District 2
- In office 1952–1992
- Preceded by: Leonard J. Roach
- Succeeded by: Yvonne Brathwaite Burke

Member of the Los Angeles City Council from the 8th district
- In office July 1, 1947 – June 15, 1953
- Preceded by: Charles A. Allen
- Succeeded by: Gordon Hahn

Personal details
- Born: August 19, 1920 Los Angeles, California, U.S.
- Died: October 12, 1997 (aged 77) Inglewood, California, U.S.
- Resting place: Inglewood Park Cemetery
- Party: Democratic
- Spouse: Ramona (Fox) Hahn
- Children: James; Janice
- Education: Pepperdine College
- Occupation: Politician

Kenneth Frederick Hahn (August 19, 1920 – October 12, 1997) was a member of the Los Angeles County Board of Supervisors for forty years, from 1952 to 1992. Hahn was on the Los Angeles City Council from 1947 to 1952. He was an ardent supporter of civil rights throughout the 1960s, and met Martin Luther King Jr. in 1961.

== Early life ==
Hahn was born August 19, 1920, in Los Angeles, the son of Hattie Louise (Wiggins) of Nottawa, Canada, and John Heinrich Hahn. The couple moved from Saskatchewan to Los Angeles in 1919, and Hahn's father died just a few months later. The couple had six other sons—Henry, John, Allan, Louis, George, and Gordon.

He went to public schools in Los Angeles, including John Muir Junior High School and Fremont High School, class of 1938. He graduated from Pepperdine College in 1942. He received a master's degree in education while he was on the City Council. He also had a secondary-school teaching credential.

Hahn began his working career as a partner in the Hahn Brothers' Service Station at 6300 South Main Street, at the foot of San Pedro Street in the South Park area. Before World War II he was a messenger for the County Probation Department and the Los Angeles Police Department.

== Military service ==
Hahn entered the Navy as an enlisted man in 1942 and earned a commission after studying at naval schools at Northwestern and Notre Dame universities. He was a ship's pilot in San Pedro, the youngest pilot in the history of the Port of Los Angeles. He served with the U.S. Seventh Fleet in the South Pacific as the commanding officer of a supply ship and was discharged in 1946 as a lieutenant. After the war, in 1947, he taught American government and history at Pepperdine.

== Career ==
Hahn's first try for public office was as a candidate for the State Assembly in the 66th District in June 1946. Hahn, a Democrat, won the Republican nomination in the primary election but lost the Democratic nomination, and therefore he could not compete. Instead the Republicans were able to nominate another candidate at a convention.

=== City Council ===
==== Elections ====
Hahn unseated Charles A. Allen, the incumbent in Los Angeles City Council District 8, in 1947. He was supported by students at Pepperdine College, which at that time was located in the 8th District: they circulated his nominating petitions and did house-to-house campaigning for him. At age 26 he was the youngest person elected to the City Council to that time. He was reelected in 1949 and 1951. In that era, the 8th District was bounded on the north by Vernon Avenue, on the west by Western Avenue, on the east by the city limits or Alameda Street and on the south by about Slauson Avenue.

Hahn left the council on December 1, 1952, when he became a county supervisor.

==== Positions ====
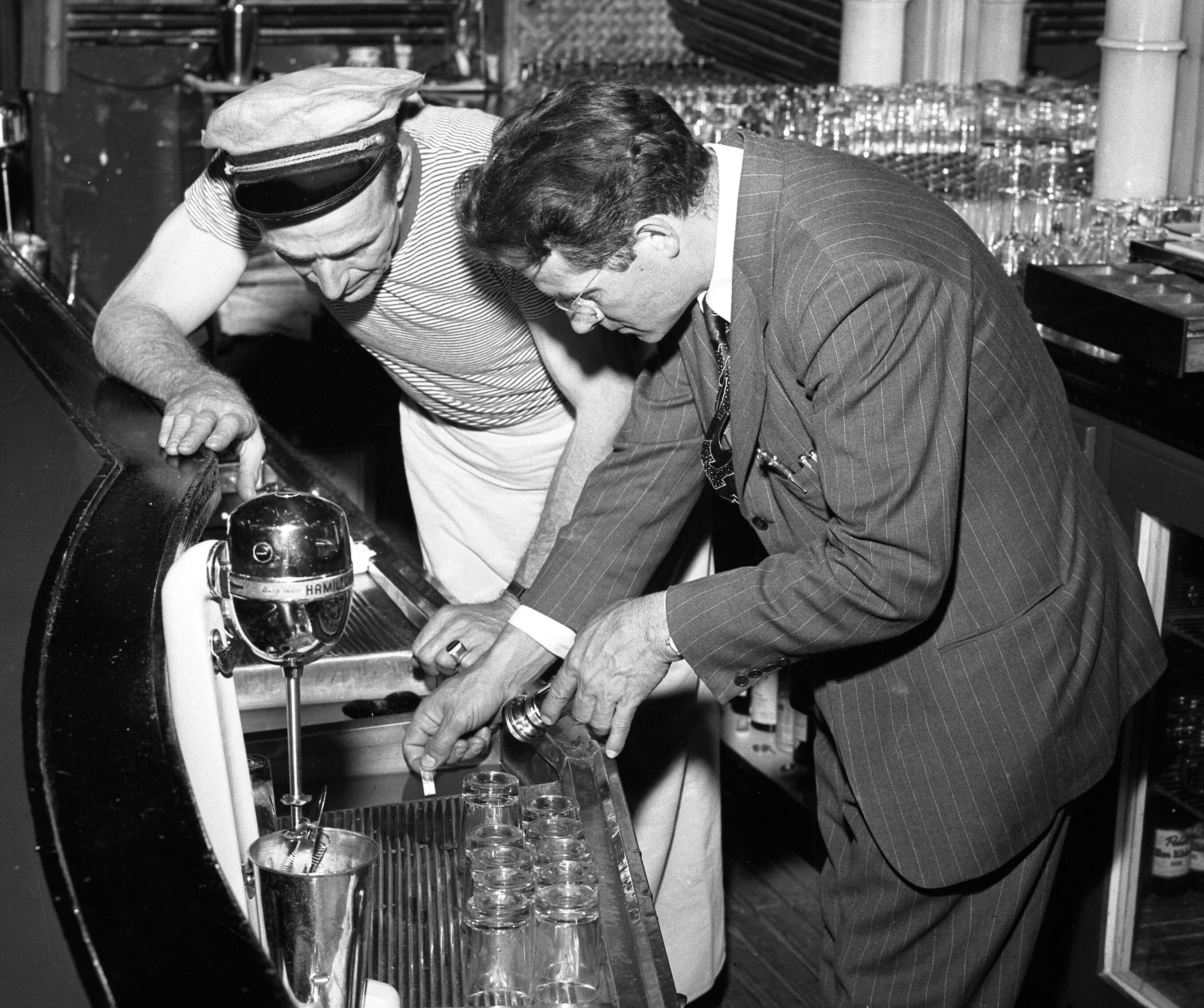
Hahn inspecting a bar at a nightclub, 1948.

Jail, 1947. He urged a delay in the building of a new jail in Lincoln Heights until the council could hear from Assemblyman Vernon Kilpatrick, who declared in a letter that the proposed lockup represented "outmoded thinking concerning jail programs" and suggested that the money be spent for more "sunshine and fresh air" prison camps. His motion failed on a 6–6 vote.

Smog, 1949. The council adopted Hahn's resolution asking Air Pollution Control Director Gordon P. Larson to appear before it to report on the worsening smog situation in Los Angeles. "The entire smog program seems to have bogged down," he said. "Yesterday it was almost impossible to breathe in my office, and I am informed that some places had to shut down completely."

Feud, 1950. He and Councilman Harold Harby engaged in what was called a "feud" over various subjects, including their differences concerning the subject of continuing wartime rent control in Los Angeles, with Hahn favoring and Harby opposing. Harby also called a suggestion by Hahn for a pay raise for city employees "political prostitution in its lowest form." Harby used the same term, calling Hahn a "political prostitute" in a raucous debate over the fate of a $110-million-dollar public housing proposal for the city (Hahn in favor and Harby opposed). At one point, Harby "reached over" and shoved Hahn back into his seat.

Birds, 1951. Hahn proposed a special police patrol to protect birds nesting on the City Hall grounds. The idea was referred to a committee.

Un-American, 1952. Hahn and Council Members Harold A. Henry, Earle D. Baker and J. Win Austin attended a dinner meeting in South Gate to honor the House Committee on Un-American Activities.

=== Board of Supervisors ===
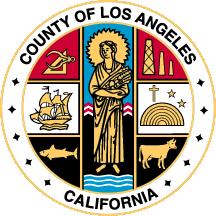
The Los Angeles County Seal was designed by Kenneth Hahn and drawn by Millard Sheets. It was approved and adopted in 1957, and was used until September 2004, when it was replaced by a slightly-modified version.

Hahn was elected to the County Board of Supervisors for the first time in 1952. He was elected to his tenth term in 1988 with 84% of the vote. He was known for his promotion of social causes, bringing the Los Angeles Dodgers to Los Angeles and putting emergency call boxes along freeways. In 1970 he joined with his personal physician, cardiologist Walter S. Graf, to establish the first system of emergency paramedic care in California; Hahn is credited with winning support for the then-radical idea from the Board of Supervisors and the state legislature, and persuading then-governor Ronald Reagan to sign the bill authorizing the provision of emergency medical care by trained personnel other than doctors and nurses.

At the Board of Supervisors, Hahn designed the County Seal adopted in 1957, which was modified in 2004 due to the Christian cross on the seal. The American Civil Liberties Union had threatened a lawsuit if the county had not removed the cross.

In 1961, Hahn was the only public official to greet Martin Luther King Jr. when he came to Los Angeles "after confronting the police dogs and water hoses of Birmingham". After King was assassinated in April 1968, Hahn asked King’s wife, Coretta Scott King if a new hospital could be named after him. Martin Luther King Jr./Drew Medical Center opened in 1972.

At the Los Angeles County Transportation Commission, Hahn proposed and eventually achieved consensus in favor of putting a proposition on the ballot that not only included funding for a rail network (controversial in some suburban communities), but also funding for local transit to be spent by the local communities as well as lower bus fares for three years. While the two previous rail transit ballot measures were rejected by the electorate, the compromise Proposition A was approved at the November 4, 1980 election by 54% of voters and eventually led to the creation of the Los Angeles Metro Rail network.

== Death ==
Hahn died of heart failure on October 12, 1997, at the age of 77 in an Inglewood hospital. A funeral service was held at Faith Dome of Crenshaw Christian Center on Vermont Avenue, and interment followed at Inglewood Park Cemetery.

== Personal life ==
Hahn was married to Ramona Hahn. They had two children, James and Janice. They lived at 833-1/2 West 69th Street in the Vermont-Slauson district. He was a "deeply religious man who often quoted Scripture".

Hahn was reported to have suffered a stroke in 1987, from which he recovered over a lengthy period of time. His recovery did not substantially affect his popularity or reelection.

Hahn belonged to an influential political dynasty, the Hahn family of California: One brother, Gordon Hahn, replaced him on the Los Angeles City Council, while another, John, was assistant county clerk. His son, James Hahn, was Los Angeles city attorney from 1985 to 2001 and mayor from 2001 to 2005. James Hahn is now a judge on the Los Angeles County Superior Court.

Hahn's daughter, Janice Hahn, was on the Los Angeles City Council and was a member of the U.S. House of Representatives; she is now on the County Board of Supervisors. A nephew, Dale Hahn, was a Superior Court judge (in San Mateo County) until retiring in 2004.

== Legacy ==
Hahn is memorialized in the name of the main county building in Downtown Los Angeles as the Kenneth Hahn Hall of Administration.

He is also remembered in the naming of a large park in Baldwin Hills, the Kenneth Hahn State Recreation Area. The 103rd Street/Kenneth Hahn station on the A Line of the Los Angeles Metro Rail is named in his honor.

For his contribution to sports in Los Angeles, he was honored with a Los Angeles Memorial Coliseum "Court of Honor" plaque by the Coliseum commissioners.

Political offices
Preceded by Baxter Ward; Peter F. Schabarum	Chair of Los Angeles County; 1977-1978; 1979–1980	Succeeded by Peter F. Schabarum; Edmund D. Edelman
Preceded by Leonard J. Roach	Los Angeles County Board of Supervisors; 2nd District; 1952–1992	Succeeded by Yvonne Brathwaite Burke
Preceded by Charles A. Allen	Los Angeles City Council; 8th District; 1947–1952	Succeeded by Gordon Hahn
