= Janice Hahn =

American politician (born 1952)

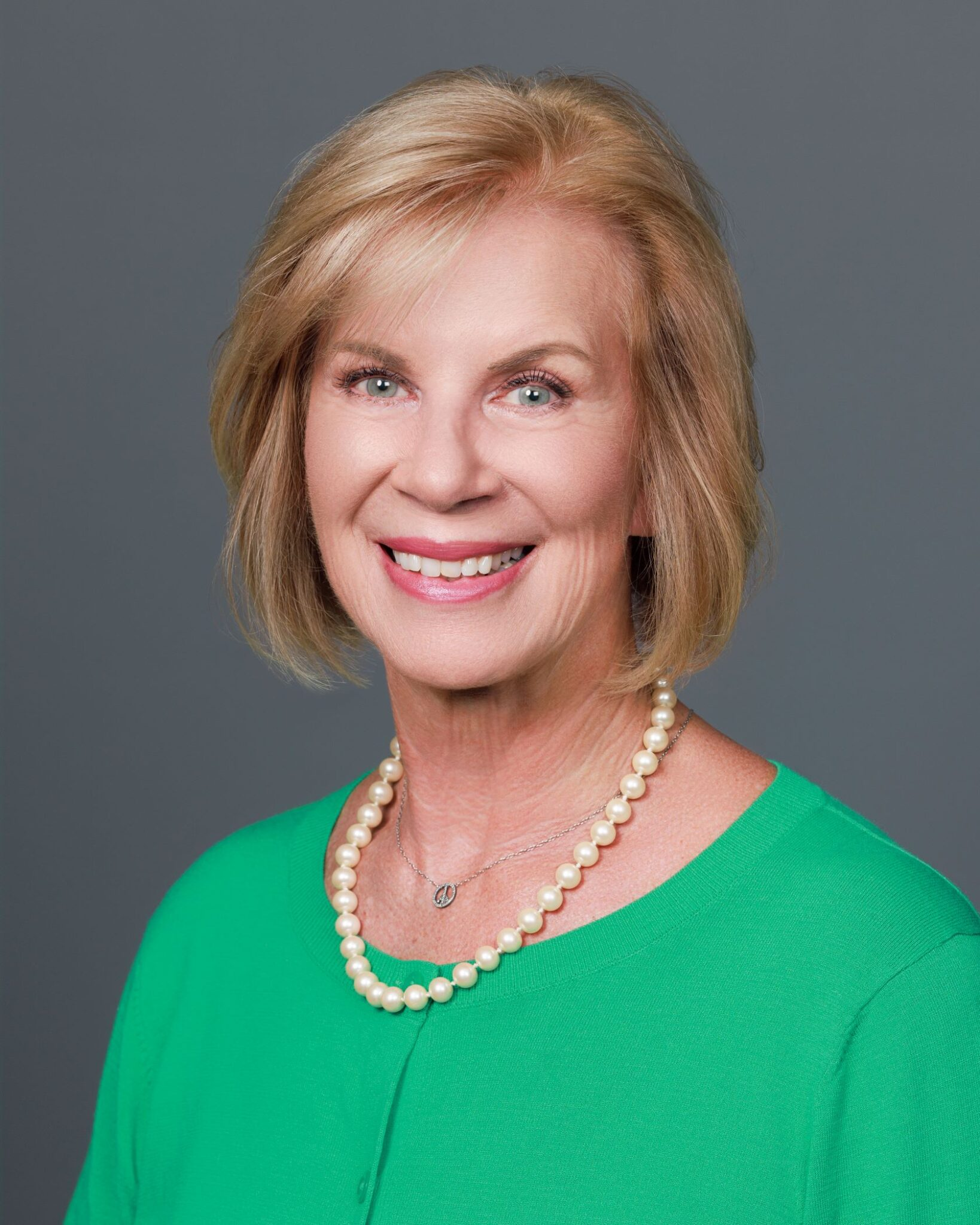
- Official portrait, 2025

Chair of Los Angeles County
- In office December 6, 2022 – December 5, 2023
- Preceded by: Holly Mitchell
- Succeeded by: Lindsey Horvath
- In office December 4, 2018 – December 3, 2019
- Preceded by: Sheila Kuehl
- Succeeded by: Kathryn Barger

Member of the Los Angeles County Board of Supervisors from the 4th district
- Incumbent
- Assumed office December 5, 2016
- Preceded by: Don Knabe

Member of the U.S. House of Representatives from California
- In office July 12, 2011 – December 4, 2016 (Note: Hahn's official service begins on the date of the special election, while she was not sworn in until July 19, 2011.)
- Preceded by: Jane Harman
- Succeeded by: Nanette Barragán
- Constituency: 36th district (2011–2013); 44th district (2013–2016)

Member of the Los Angeles City Council from the 15th district
- In office July 1, 2001 – July 12, 2011
- Preceded by: Rudy Svorinich
- Succeeded by: Joe Buscaino

Personal details
- Born: Janice Kay Hahn; March 30, 1952 (age 74) Los Angeles, California, U.S.
- Party: Democratic
- Spouse: Gary Baucum (divorced)
- Children: 3
- Relatives: Kenneth Hahn (father); James Hahn (brother); Gordon Hahn (uncle)
- Education: Abilene Christian University (BS)
- Website: Official Website

Janice Kay Hahn (born March 30, 1952) is an American politician serving as a member of the Los Angeles County Board of Supervisors from the 4th district since 2016. A member of the Democratic Party, she was a U.S. representative from California from 2011 to 2016, elected in the 36th congressional district until 2013 and later in the 44th congressional district. She was previously a member of the Los Angeles City Council, representing the 15th district from 2001 to 2011. From 1997 to 1999, she served as an elected representative on the Los Angeles Charter Reform Commission.

On July 12, 2011, Hahn won a special election for Congress to fill the seat vacated by Democrat Jane Harman. She defeated Republican Craig Huey, a Tea Party-backed direct marketer from the Torrance area, with 55 percent of the vote to Huey's 45 percent. In February 2015, Hahn announced she was retiring from Congress to run for the Los Angeles County Board of Supervisors in 2016. In the general election, Hahn defeated Steve Napolitano to succeed Don Knabe to become the next Los Angeles County supervisor from the 4th district. She was sworn in on December 5, 2016.

== Early life and education ==
Hahn was born in Los Angeles and raised in a politically involved family. She is the daughter of Ramona Belle (née Fox) and Kenneth Frederick Hahn, a career member of the Los Angeles County Board of Supervisors who also served on the Los Angeles City Council.

Her uncle, Gordon Hahn, was a member of the California State Assembly and a Los Angeles City Councilman from the late 1940s to the early 1960s. Her brother, James Hahn, served as Los Angeles City Controller from 1981 to 1985, City Attorney from 1985 to 2001 and Mayor of Los Angeles from 2001 until 2005. Hahn's maternal grandparents served as missionaries in Japan in the 1920s and 1930s.

Hahn attended Abilene Christian University in Texas, earning a Bachelor of Science in education in 1974.

== Early career ==
=== Education and business ===
She taught at the Good News Academy, a private school in Westchester from 1974 to 1978. Her other work in the private sector has included Public Affairs Region Manager at Southern California Edison from 1995 to 2000; Vice President for Prudential Securities in Public Finance, Director of Community Outreach for Western Waste Industries, and Director of Marketing for the Alexander Haagen Company.

=== Local commissions ===
Hahn was elected to represent the Fifteenth District on the Los Angeles Charter Reform Commission, serving from 1997 to 1999. As a Commissioner, she fought for many of the reforms included in the new charter, including Area Planning Commissions, local representation on the citizen commissions governing Los Angeles International Airport and the Port of Los Angeles, and a system of neighborhood councils.

=== 1998 congressional election ===
In 1998, U.S. Congresswoman Jane Harman declined to run for re-election, choosing instead to run for Governor of California. Hahn then won the Democratic nomination to succeed Harman, but lost the general election to Republican State Assemblyman Steven T. Kuykendall 49%-47%.

== Los Angeles City Council (2001–2011) ==
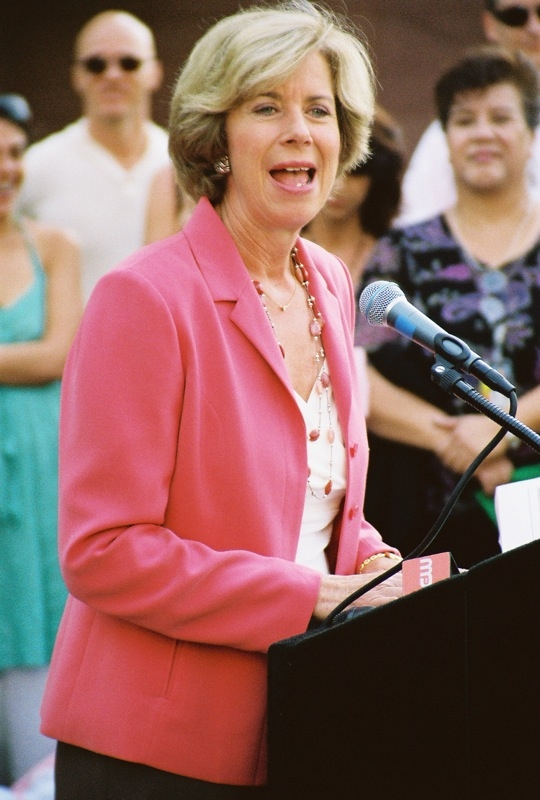
Hahn giving a speech in 2007

Hahn served on the Los Angeles City Council, representing the 15th District, from 2001 to 2011. The 15th District encompasses the San Pedro Harbor and includes the ethnically diverse communities of Harbor City, Harbor Gateway, San Pedro, Watts and Wilmington. She was reelected to her third and final term in November 2009.

She has been called "one of the most pro-labor members" of the City Council, and a "consistent opponent of layoffs and furloughs for city workers." Hahn walked the picket lines with unionized dockworkers in 2002. After the Bush administration suggested it would intervene in the labor dispute by using government troops to operate the ports, Hahn urged non-intervention. "'There's no room for the federal government. There's only one reason for them to get involved, and that's to break the union', she said." She was the leading force on the City Council behind both the passage of a living wage ordinance for the hotel workers along Century Boulevard near Los Angeles International Airport (LAX) and the provision of improved health benefits to LAX employees.

Hahn cites her efforts to clean up the Port of Los Angeles as one of her main accomplishments while on the City Council. The 2006 Clean Air Action Plan, which she and Mayor Antonio Villaraigosa pushed forward, set a goal of reducing pollution by 45 percent within five years and shifted the movement of goods at the ports to off-peak traffic hours. Hahn supported the addition of the Clean Trucks Program that requires the 16,000 diesel trucks serving the ports meet 2007 EPA emission standards within five years. She has noted that the ports have been Southern California's largest emitter of greenhouse gasses and diesel emissions and that the Clean Trucks Program also provides for improved working conditions, wages and benefits for port truckers. Prior to the Clean Air Action Plan, she had already shifted about 35% of goods to be moved during off-peak hours. Hahn also helped advance redevelopment projects at the Port of Los Angeles in both San Pedro and Wilmington.

On the City Council, Hahn was a major proponent of gang prevention, intervention, and suppression programs. She led the campaign to pass Measure A, which would have dedicated a sustainable revenue stream for those programs, but fell just shy of the two thirds percentage needed to pass. On a smaller level, she expanded the Gang Alternatives Program to all elementary schools in her district.

== 2010 lieutenant gubernatorial election ==
Hahn ran for Lieutenant Governor of California in 2010 but was defeated in the Democratic primary by San Francisco Mayor Gavin Newsom, finishing second in a field of three candidates. She received 33.3% of the vote against Newsom's 55.5%.

== U.S. House of Representatives (2011–2016) ==
=== Elections ===
==== 2011 ====
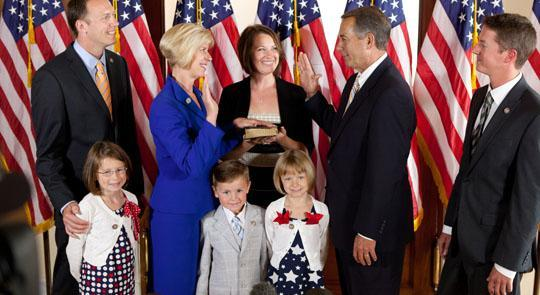
Hahn is sworn into office by House Speaker John Boehner on July 19, 2011.

On February 7, 2011, Hahn announced her intention to run for the U.S. House of Representatives in the special election to fill California's 36th congressional district seat vacated by U.S. Representative Jane Harman's departure to head the Woodrow Wilson International Center for Scholars.

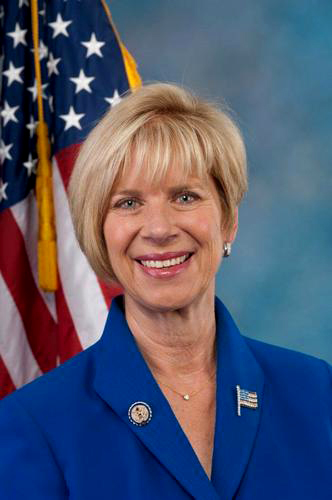
Hahn in the 112th Congress

Hahn was one of sixteen candidates from all parties who competed in the special election primary on May 17, 2011. She finished first with 24 percent of the vote; Republican Craig Huey finished second with 22 percent. Because no candidate received more than 50 percent, Hahn and Huey, the top two finishers, faced off in a special runoff election on July 12. Many had expected California Secretary of State Debra Bowen to secure one of the top two spots, but Bowen finished in third place.

The Los Angeles County Federation of Labor, AFL–CIO, endorsed Hahn in March 2011, a move the Daily Breeze called "significant" because of the fundraising and get-out-the-vote power of the large organization. As of March 23, 2011, Hahn had received endorsements from Senator Dianne Feinstein, Los Angeles Mayor Antonio Villaraigosa, Los Angeles County Sheriff Lee Baca, California Assembly Speaker John A. Pérez, California State Senator Ted Lieu, Torrance Firefighters Association Local 1138, and other notable figures such as former LA Laker Earvin "Magic" Johnson and environmentalist and actor Ed Begley, Jr.

On April 25, 2011, Hahn secured the endorsement of the Los Angeles Times. Following her victory in the primary, Hahn was endorsed by California Democrats Governor Jerry Brown, Lieutenant Governor Gavin Newsom (who defeated Hahn in the 2010 primary race for lieutenant governor), House Minority Leader Nancy Pelosi and House Minority Whip Steny Hoyer of Maryland. EMILYs List, an organization that supports female candidates who support abortion rights, also endorsed Hahn. On June 5, 2011, Hahn was officially endorsed by primary opponent Marcy Winograd, California State Controller John Chiang, Assemblyman Warren Furutani and Assemblywoman Betsy Butler, as well as the gun-control group Brady Campaign.

A poll conducted by the Daily Kos and Service Employees International Union shortly before the July 2011 election had Hahn in the lead over Huey by 8 points, (52 percent to 44 percent) with 4 percent undecided. Her final margin of victory was 9 points, 54.56 percent to 45.44.

==== 2012 ====
After redistricting dismantled her old district, Hahn decided to run in the newly redrawn 44th district, which included her home in San Pedro. That district had previously been the 37th, represented by fellow Democratic Congresswoman Laura Richardson. The California Democratic Party endorsed Hahn.

In the all-party primary (created as a result of Proposition 14), she finished first over Richardson by a wide margin, taking 60 percent of the vote to Richardson's 40 percent. This was all the more remarkable since Hahn was running in territory that was more than 60 percent new to her. In the general election, Hahn defeated Richardson with 60.2 percent of the vote to Richardson's 39.7 percent.

=== Committee assignments ===
- House Committee on Homeland Security
- House Committee on Small Business

Caucuses

- PORTS Caucus
- Congressional Progressive Caucus
- Congressional Asian Pacific American Caucus
- Out of Afghanistan Caucus

=== Political positions ===
On Nov. 19, 2015, Hahn voted for HR 4038, legislation that would effectively halt the resettlement of refugees from Syria and Iraq to the United States. Hahn supports the conversion of dangerous Modified Hydrofluoric Acid (MHF) at refineries to a safer alternative.

== Los Angeles County Board of Supervisors ==
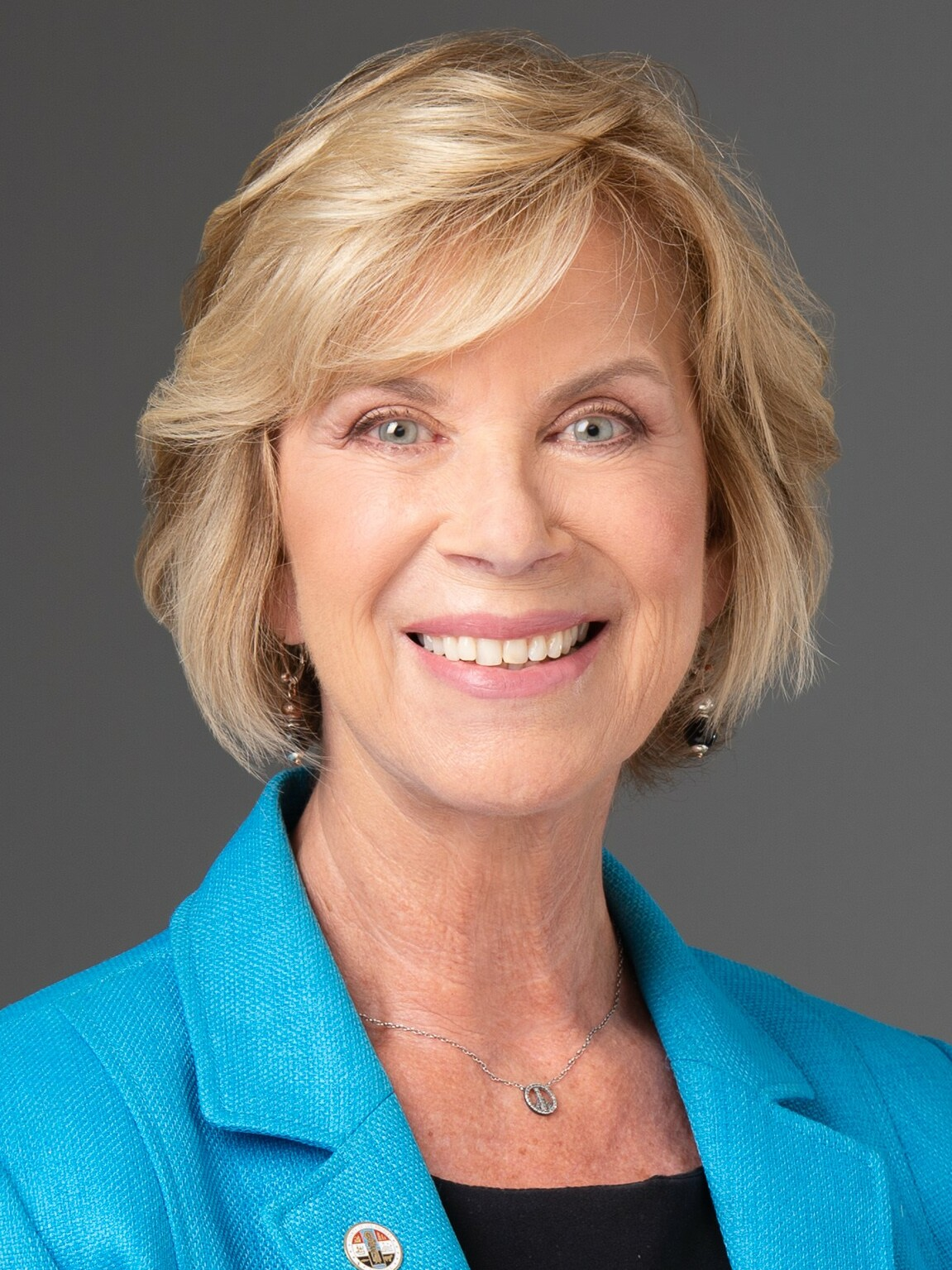
Hahn in 2017

In 2018, Hahn supported the appointment of Nicole Tinkham as interim public defender, despite a letter signed by 390 public defenders who were concerned that Tinkham lacked criminal law experience and the potential for a conflict of interest, given Tinkham’s prior representation of the Los Angeles County Sheriff’s Department.

== Recognition ==
Some of the awards received by Hahn include the Rosa Parks Award from the Southern Christian Leadership Conference, the Bold Vision Award from the San Pedro Chamber of Commerce, the Public Service Award from the African-American Chamber of Commerce, the Recognition Award from the Harbor Area Gang Alternative Program, and enshrinement on the Promenade of Prominence in Watts.

== Personal life ==
Hahn is a lifelong resident of Los Angeles and lives in San Pedro. A member of the Hahn family of California, she is the mother of three children, a grandmother of five, and a member of the Churches of Christ.

== Electoral history ==
Los Angeles Primary Election April 22, 1997 Charter Commissioner District 15
Candidate	Votes	%
Janice Hahn	10,092	49
Jerry L. Gaines	6,857	34
Linda Louise Forster	3,496	17
Turnout		31.0%

Los Angeles General Election June 13, 1997 Charter Commissioner District 15
Candidate	Votes	%
Janice Hahn	5,709	65
Jerry L. Gaines	3,036	35
Turnout		31.0%

General Election November 3, 1998 U.S. House of Representatives, 36th District, CA, 1998
Party	Candidate	Votes	%
Republican	Steven T. Kuykendall	88,843	49
Democratic	Janice Hahn	84,624	47
Green	Robin Barrett	3,612	1.6
Libertarian	Kerry Welsh	3,066	1.5
Reform	John R. Konopka	1,561	0.9
Total votes		181,706	100.00
Turnout			

Los Angeles General Election June 5, 2001 City Council District 15
Candidate	Votes	%
Janice Hahn	19,005	57
Hector J. Cepeda	14,413	43
Turnout		%

Los Angeles Primary Election March 3, 2009 City Council District 15
Candidate	Votes	%
Janice Hahn	10,869	76
Chris Salabaj	3,420	24
Turnout		%

Democratic Party Primary June 8, 2010 For California lieutenant governor
Party	Candidate	Votes	%
Democratic	Gavin Newsom	1,308,860	55.5
Democratic	Janice Hahn	780,115	33.3
Democratic	Eric Korevaar	257,349	10.9
Total votes		2,346,324	100.00
Turnout		7,553,109	31.0

Open primary election May 18, 2011 U.S. House of Representatives, 36th District, CA Top 5 out of 16 candidates
Party	Candidate	Votes	%
Democratic	Janice Hahn	15,647	24.6
Republican	Craig Huey	14,116	22.2
Democratic	Debra Bowen	13,407	21
Democratic	Marcy Winograd	5,905	9.3
Republican	Mike Gin	4,997	7.9
Turnout			15

Special election July 13, 2011 U.S. House of Representatives, 36th District, CA
Party	Candidate	Votes	%
Democratic	Janice Hahn	41,585	54.56
Republican	Craig Huey	34,636	45.44
Turnout			22

General Election November 6, 2012 U.S. House of Representatives, 44th District, CA
Party	Candidate	Votes	%
Democratic	Janice Hahn	99,909	60.2
Democratic	Laura Richardson	65,989	39.8
Total votes		165,898	100.00

== See also ==
- Women in the United States House of Representatives

U.S. House of Representatives
Preceded by Jane Harman	Member of the U.S. House of Representatives from California's 36th congressional district 2011–2013	Succeeded by Raul Ruiz
Preceded by Ken Calvert	Member of the U.S. House of Representatives from California's 44th congressional district 2013–2016	Succeeded by Nanette Barragán
Political offices
Preceded by Sheila Kuehl	Chair of Los Angeles County; 2018–2019	Succeeded by Kathryn Barger
Preceded by Holly Mitchell	Chair of Los Angeles County; 2022–2023	Succeeded by Lindsey Horvath
U.S. order of precedence (ceremonial)
Preceded by James E. Rogan as Former U.S. Representative	Order of precedence of the United States as Former U.S. Representative	Succeeded by Steve Knight as Former U.S. Representative
