= Tantallon, Maryland =

Unincorporated community in Maryland, United States

Tantallon
- Unincorporated community and former Census-designated place (CDP)
- Location within the state of Maryland Tantallon (the United States)
- Coordinates: 38°43′26″N 77°1′00″W
- Country: United States
- State: Maryland
- County: Prince Georges
- Elevation: 39 ft (12 m)

Population (1980)
  - Total: 9,945
- Time zone: UTC−5 (Eastern (EST))
  - Summer (DST): UTC−4 (EDT)
- ZIP codes: 20744
- FIPS code: 24-76825
- GNIS feature ID: 598151

Tantallon is an unincorporated community in Prince George's County, Maryland, United States, and is a part of the census-designated place (CDP) of Fort Washington. The ZIP code for the community is 20744. Tantallon reported as a census-designated place by the U.S. Census Bureau in 1980. The population recorded was 9,945. Tantallon began in the 1960s as a country-club community of homes in a variety of architectural styles, and includes an 18-hole golf course, boat marina, and private swimming pool. It was named after Tantallon Castle in Scotland. Some homes have frontage on inlets of the Potomac River. It is governed by the Tantallon Citizens Association. The adjacent Hatton Point area, as well as nearby historic Fort Washington National Park, have very scenic views of the river. The bi-county parks commission's Harmony Hall Recreation Center, a county police station, and metrobus commuter service to Washington, D.C., are nearby.

== Geography ==
Tantallon is located at 38.7 degrees north, 77.0 degrees west (38.724, −77.01); or approximately 12 miles south-southeast of Washington, D.C. The elevation for the community is 39 feet above sea level.

== Education ==
The community of Tantallon is served by the Prince George's County Public Schools system, and is zoned for Friendly High School and Colin L. Powell K-8 Academy, a merger of Potomac Landing Elementary School and Isaac J. Gourdine Middle School
