= Soboroff =

Soboroff is a surname. Notable people with the surname include:

- Jacob Soboroff (born 1983), American television correspondent
- Steve Soboroff (born 1948), real estate developer and former member of the Los Angeles Board of Police Commissioners
