= Honey Training Center =

Training facility for the Los Angeles Clippers NBA team

- Interactive map of Honey Training Center
- Address: 6951 South Centinela Avenue; Playa Vista, CA 90094
- Location: Los Angeles, California
- Coordinates: 33.983212°N 118.399606°W
- Owner: Sterling Family Trust (Rochelle Sterling, Trustee)
- Type: Training facility
- Event: Professional basketball (NBA)
- Acreage: 88,963 sq ft (8,265 m^{2}) grounds 42,500 sq ft (3,950 m^{2}) building

Construction
- Groundbreaking: 6 April 2007
- Built: 2007–2008
- Opened: 25 September 2008
- Cost: $50 million
- Architect: Rossetti Architects
- Project manager: Bentley Management Group
- Structural engineer: John Labib + Associates
- General contractor: Turner Construction
- Main contractors: Martin Bros. Marcowall; Heinaman Contract Glazing; Syska Hennessy Group; CSI Electrical Contractors

Tenant
- Los Angeles Clippers (NBA) 2008–2024

The Honey Training Center is a 42,500 square foot (3,950 m^{2}) two-story training facility. It served as the main training and practice center for the Los Angeles Clippers of the National Basketball Association (NBA) from 2008 until 2024 when the organization moved all operations to Intuit Dome. Located in the planned community of Playa Vista in Los Angeles near Loyola Marymount University, the facility is at least 1 mile (1.6 km) away from nearby beaches (Playa Del Rey, Marina Del Rey, and Venice), 3 miles (4.8 km) north of Los Angeles International Airport, and 12 miles (19 km) southwest of the Clipper's previous arena, Crypto.com Arena. While the team maintained some office functions at Crypto.com Arena, the Playa Vista facility served as the official headquarters of the Clippers. The Honey Training Center is located 6 miles (9.7 km) northwest from the current Clippers arena, Intuit Dome, in Inglewood.

The training center was formally opened on 25 September 2008. The facility contains two regulation basketball courts including a duplicate of the wood floor that the team plays on at Crypto.com Arena.

== History ==
On 7 July 2005, Andy Roeser, then-executive vice president of the Clippers, and Steve Soboroff, the president of Playa Vista announced the sale of a two-acre (0.81 ha) plot where the Clippers would build what they called "a state of the art training facility." According to Soboroff, who was instrumental in the development of Crypto.com Arena and in convincing the Clippers to move there from the Los Angeles Memorial Sports Arena, Roeser had been discussing the siting of a team practice facility since 2000. Prior to the opening of the Clippers' team facility, the team conducted its practices and workouts at the Spectrum Club, a fitness center in nearby El Segundo, approximately 1 mile (1.6 km) south of the Toyota Sports Center, the practice facility and team headquarters of the NHL's Los Angeles Kings.

After Soboroff joined Playa Vista in 2001, they began scouting locations within the planned community until they settled on a location near the intersection of Centinela Avenue and Bluff Creek Road, just west of Sepulveda Boulevard, on the Culver City-Los Angeles city border. On 1 July 2005, the Clippers purchased the property for $4.9 million.

David Bentley of Bentley Management Group was hired as the Clipper's project manager and oversaw the design by Rosetti and the construction by Turner. Permitting was difficult due to the site being within an active archeological zone generally known as one of the first human settlements in the LA Basin approximately 8,000 years ago. Ground was broken for the facility on 6 April 2007. The Clippers Training Center officially opened on 25 September 2008, as the team conducted its annual Media Day event; it was also revealed on that same day that longtime team executive Elgin Baylor had left the organization after 22 years. In addition to serving as the team's facility, the Clippers have opened the facility to several non-Clipper players throughout the NBA (many of whom have off-season homes in greater Los Angeles) for off-season workouts, as well as in-season game-day practices for visiting NBA teams who play the Clippers and/or the Lakers.

=== Steve Soboroff Court Park ===
A new park, sometimes referred to as Clippers Court Park, was constructed adjacent to the training facility on Bluff Creek Drive. The park was named for Playa Vista's former president, Steve Soboroff. Inside the park are two full-size basketball courts, a tennis court and tot lot. On the pro-style court, the Clippers logo is placed in the center.

The park's dedication, on 22 March 2011, was attended by Soboroff, Clippers President Andy Roeser, Clippers players Blake Griffin and Eric Gordon, as well as other dignitaries.

The Clippers contributed $100,000 towards the construction of the park.
