= Pantry (disambiguation) =

A pantry is a food store. The term may also refer to:

== People ==
- John Pantry, musician

== Business ==
- The Original Pantry Cafe, an iconic Los Angeles restaurant
- The Pantry, an American convenience store located primarily in the Southeastern United States

== Other ==
- Pantry, the area to the right and left of the non-volley zone in pickleball
