= 2005 Los Angeles mayoral election =

- March 8, 2005 (primary); May 17, 2005 (runoff)
- Turnout: 33.94%
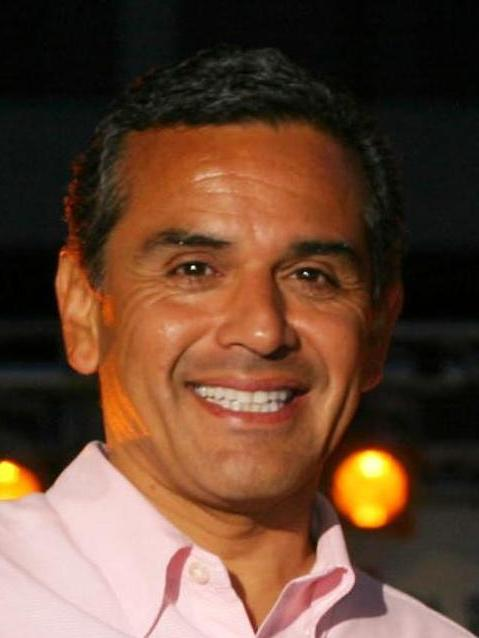

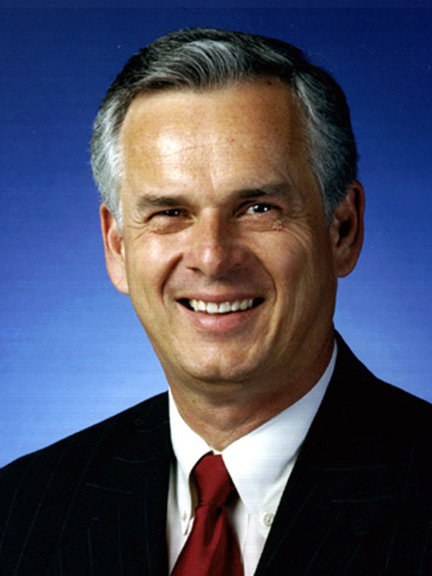

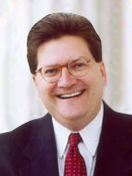

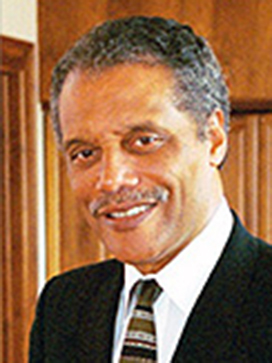
| Candidate | Antonio Villaraigosa | James Hahn |
| First round | 136,242; 33.10% | 97,049; 23.58% |
| Runoff | 289,116; 58.63% | 203,968; 41.37% |
| Candidate | Robert Hertzberg | Bernard C. Parks |
| First round | 90,495; 21.99% | 55,808; 13.56% |
| Runoff | Eliminated | Eliminated |
- Villaraigosa: 30–40% 40–50% 50–60% 60–70% 70–80% 80–90% Hahn: 30–40% 40–50%
Mayor before election
James Hahn
Elected Mayor
Antonio Villaraigosa

The 2005 Los Angeles mayoral election took place on March 8, 2005, with a run-off election on May 17, 2005. In a rematch of the 2001 election, Councilman Antonio Villaraigosa defeated the sitting mayor, James Hahn, becoming the city's first Hispanic mayor since the 19th century.

Municipal elections in California, including mayor of Los Angeles, are officially nonpartisan; candidates' party affiliations do not appear on the ballot.

== Candidates ==
- Richard Alarcon, state senator and former member of the Los Angeles City Council from Northridge
- Martin Luther King Aubrey Sr.
- Ted Crisell
- Bruce Henry Darian
- James Hahn, incumbent mayor since 2001
- Robert Hertzberg, speaker of the California State Assembly
- Wendy Lyons
- Addie Mae Miller
- Walter Moore, attorney and activist
- Bernard C. Parks, member of the Los Angeles City Council from Crenshaw and former chief of the Los Angeles Police Department
- Antonio Villaraigosa, member of the Los Angeles City Council from Eagle Rock, former speaker of the California State Assembly, and candidate for mayor in 2001
- Bill Wyatt

== Campaign ==
Philanthropist Eli Broad endorsed Hahn. State Senator Gil Cedillo, Councilman Eric Garcetti, and Councilman Cindy Miscikowski, who all endorsed Villaraigosa in 2001, switched sides and endorsed Hahn.

Governor Arnold Schwarzenegger promised Hahn that he would not participate in the election. As such, Schwarzenegger did not endorse any candidates, however he has expressed broad support for Hertzberg's plan to break up the Los Angeles Unified School District. His education secretary, and former mayor of Los Angeles, Richard Riordan, campaigned heavily for Hertzberg.

== Polling ==
| Poll source | Date(s) administered | Sample size (Note: Key: A – all adults RV – registered voters LV – likely voters V – unclear) | Margin of error | Antonio Villaraigosa | James Hahn | Other / Undecided |
|---|---|---|---|---|---|---|
| SurveyUSA | May 13–15, 2005 | 528 (LV) | ± 4.3% | 60% | 36% | 4% |

== Results ==
Although Villaraigosa garnered the plurality of votes in the general election, his lack of an outright majority forced a special election between him and the incumbent Hahn. With less than 34% of registered voters participating, Villaraigosa won the runoff.

With his election, Villaraigosa became the first Latino mayor of Los Angeles since 1872. Hahn became the first incumbent to lose re-election in 32 years since Sam Yorty lost to Tom Bradley in the 1973 Los Angeles mayoral election.

=== Primary election ===
Los Angeles mayoral primary election, March 8, 2005
| Candidate | Votes | % |
|---|---|---|
| Antonio Villaraigosa | 136,242 | 33.10 |
| James Hahn (incumbent) | 97,049 | 23.58 |
| Robert Hertzberg | 90,495 | 21.99 |
| Bernard C. Parks | 55,808 | 13.56 |
| Richard Alarcon | 14,815 | 3.60 |
| Walter Moore | 11,409 | 2.77 |
| Wendy Lyons | 1,963 | 0.48 |
| Addie M. Miller | 1,287 | 0.31 |
| Martin Luther King Aubrey, Sr. | 868 | 0.21 |
| Bill Wyatt | 762 | 0.19 |
| Bruce Harry Darian | 512 | 0.12 |
| Ted Crisell | 394 | 0.10 |
| Total votes | 411,604 | 100.00 |

=== General election ===
Los Angeles mayoral general election, May 17, 2005
| Candidate | Votes | % |
|---|---|---|
| Antonio Villaraigosa | 289,116 | 58.63 |
| James Hahn (incumbent) | 203,968 | 41.37 |
| Total votes | 493,084 | 100.00 |
