= American Reporter =

American newspaper

The American Reporter was the first online-only newspaper to use content that was specifically written for the web, rather than items fed from a news wire. It was started in 1995 by Joe Shea, and last published in September 2016, a month before Shea's death. It was published seven days per week as an electronic daily newspaper, cooperatively owned by the writers whose work it featured.

== History ==
The American Reporter was started by members of the Society of Professional Journalists Internet discussion list but was never affiliated with the SPJ. The paper began publication on April 10, 1995, becoming the first daily Internet news site with original news and features. Nine days later, the paper's chief correspondent, former Memphis AP bureau chief Bill Johnson, began breaking news coverage of the Alfred P. Murrah Federal Building bombing in Oklahoma City, which continued until the death of Timothy McVeigh and the conviction of his accomplice.

The paper has no political, corporate or other affiliation, but was founded to give journalists around the world an opportunity to have a financial stake in their own work. Each story carried by the paper earned equity for the correspondent in profits from advertising and subscriptions, and income when their stories sold to other newspapers.

== Recognition ==
The paper was honored by the ACLU in 2000 with an Upton Sinclair Freedom of Expression Award ("Uppie") for its groundbreaking First Amendment victory in the Shea v. Reno U.S. Supreme Court case, in which Internet censorship was ruled unconstitutional.

Among the paper's other major accomplishments were the worldwide scoop on the Good Friday IRA ceasefire in Northern Ireland, reported by AR correspondent Stephen O'Reilly, and reporting on the beginning of the end of the Suharto era by Nieman International Fellow Andreas Harsono of Jakarta. Joe Shea won the Los Angeles Press Club award for the Best Internet News Story in 2000 for an article that led to the arrest of eight people to jail on charges of fraud in a multimillion-dollar "pyramid" scam. AR Chief of Correspondents Randolph Holhut won the Vermont Press Association's first place award for editorial writing in 2007.

== See also ==
- Cal Coast News
