= Chartway Arena =

Multipurpose arena in Norfolk, Virginia, US

- The Ted

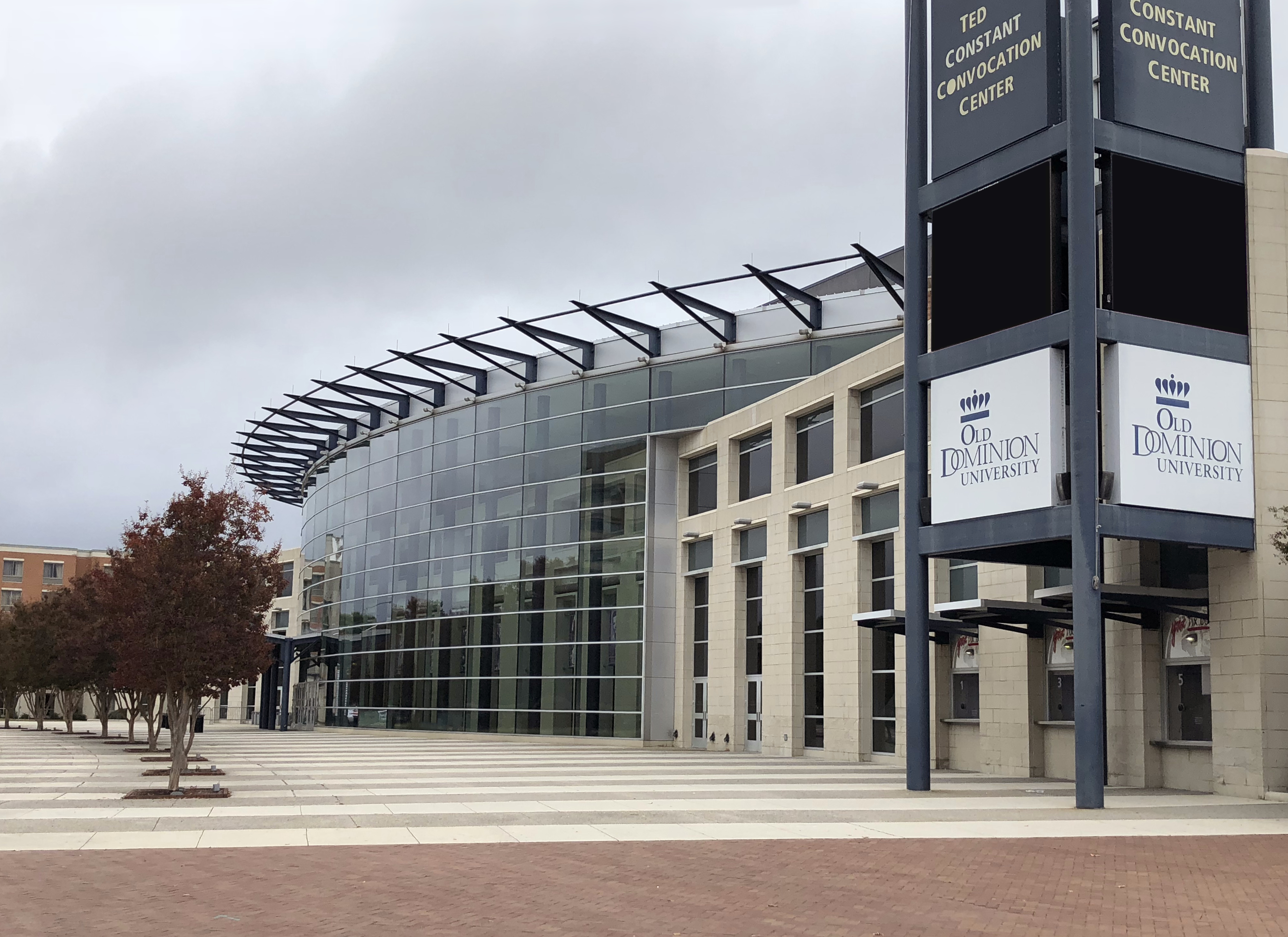
- Interactive map of Chartway Arena
- Full name: Chartway Arena at the Ted Constant Convocation Center
- Address: 4320 Hampton Boulevard
- Location: Norfolk, Virginia, U.S.
- Coordinates: 36°53′3.01″N 76°18′4.43″W
- Owner: Old Dominion University
- Operator: OVG360
- Capacity: 8,472 (Basketball); 9,520 (Concerts)
- Surface: Multi-surface

Construction
- Groundbreaking: June 17, 2000
- Opened: October 25, 2002
- Cost: $47 million ($84.1 million in 2025 dollars)
- Architects: Rossetti Architects; Moseley Architects
- Structural engineers: Stroud, Pence & Associates Ltd.
- General contractor: S.B. Ballard Construction Company

Tenants
- Old Dominion Monarchs (NCAA) (2002–present)

Website
- chartwayarena.com

Chartway Arena at the Ted Constant Convocation Center is a 219,330-square-foot (20,376 m^{2}), multi-purpose arena in Norfolk, Virginia, United States, on the campus of Old Dominion University. It is operated by Oak View Group. Chartway Arena is part of the University Village project, a 75-acre (30 ha) development that features a shopping center that includes restaurants, offices, research labs and residences with connections to the campus. It has 7,319 seats, 862 upper club/priority seats, 16 suites, and a jumbotron scoreboard.

"The Ted" was designed by Michigan-based architecture firm Rossetti and seats 8,639 for basketball games and 9,520 for concerts. In addition to its use for home basketball games and cheerleading competitions, the complex is used to host family-oriented events as well as concerts, lectures, graduation ceremonies, and career fairs.

== Basketball ==
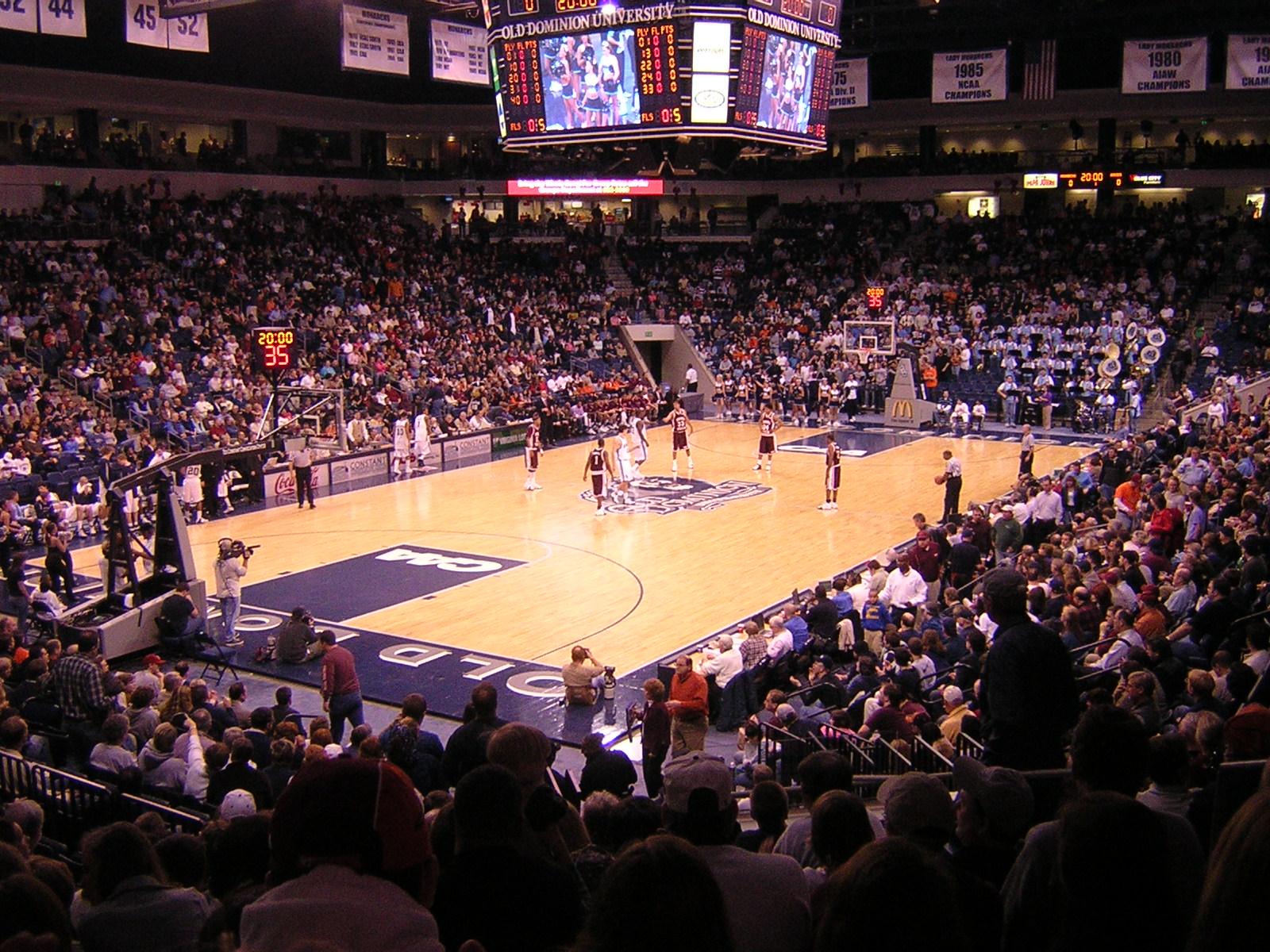
Old Dominion vs. Virginia Tech at the Ted Constant Convocation Center in 2005

=== Men's basketball ===
Through the 2018–19 season, the Old Dominion Monarchs men's basketball team has a record of 212–66 at the Constant Center for a winning percentage of 76.3%.

Year	Home Record	Attendance	Average Per Game	National Ranking
2002–03	8–6	82,742	5,910	No. 95
2003–04	11–4	85,424	5,695	No. 96
2004–05	14–1	90,327	6,021	No. 91
2005–06	14–1	103,725	6,915	No. 78
2006–07	15–2	105,851	6,227	No. 88
2007–08	13–4	114,857	6,756	No. 82
2008–09	16–3	114,911	6,048	No. 88
2009–10	15–0	104,930	6,995	No. 76
2010–11	14–2	123,922	7,745	No. 66
2011–12	10–7	128,563	7,142	No. 73
2012–13	2–15	112,335	6,608	No. 77
2013–14	12–6	104,008	5,778	No. 92
2014–15	20–0	140,072	7,004	No. 69
2015–16	12–4	112,604	7,037	No. 68
2016–17	11–4	98,590	6,572	No. 81
2017–18	12–2	88,851	6,346	N/A
2018–19	13–5	105,916	6,620	N/A
Overall	212–66 (.763)			

=== Women's basketball ===
On March 17 and 19, 2012, the Ted hosted the first and second round of the 2012 NCAA Women's Division I Basketball Tournament.

== Other events ==
Chartway Arena has hosted concerts and shows by Bruce Springsteen, Bob Dylan, B. B. King, Dave Chappelle, Elton John, J. Cole, Mike Epps, Thomas and Friends and Green Day. Many other tour-based events such as the Harlem Globetrotters, Disney On Ice performances, Impact Wrestling TV tapings, and UFC events have came to the arena. On October 20, 2003, the facility hosted an NBA preseason matchup between the Philadelphia 76ers and the New Orleans Hornets. On November 17, 2021, All Elite Wrestling taped episodes of their weekly television shows AEW Dynamite and AEW Rampage in the arena.

The largest event that took place at the arena was an Elton John concert on March 18, 2011. Tickets for this event sold out in under 4 hours. The Ted had to add around 1,000 additional seats to accommodate all of the audience members who purchased tickets.

== Operations ==
Chartway Arena is managed by OVG360, a division of Oak View Group. In June 2019, Chartway Federal Credit Union made a $4.25 million branding and sponsorship agreement with Old Dominion to get the arena named, which is located inside the Ted Constant Convocation Center complex.

In 2015, the arena received upgraded video systems throughout the arena including a digital scoreboard from Daktronics. In 2021, a newly constructed, full-service Starbucks location opened inside the complex, located on the 43rd Street side of the venue near Hampton Blvd.

== See also ==
- List of NCAA Division I basketball arenas
