= 2001 Los Angeles mayoral election =

- April 10, 2001 (primary); June 5, 2001 (runoff)
- Turnout: 37.67%
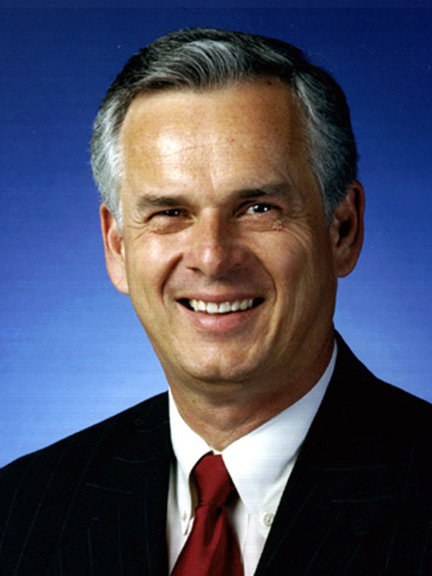

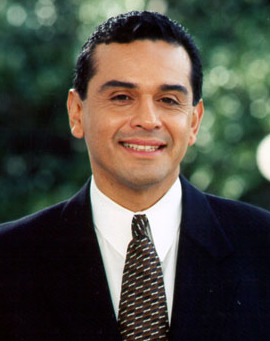

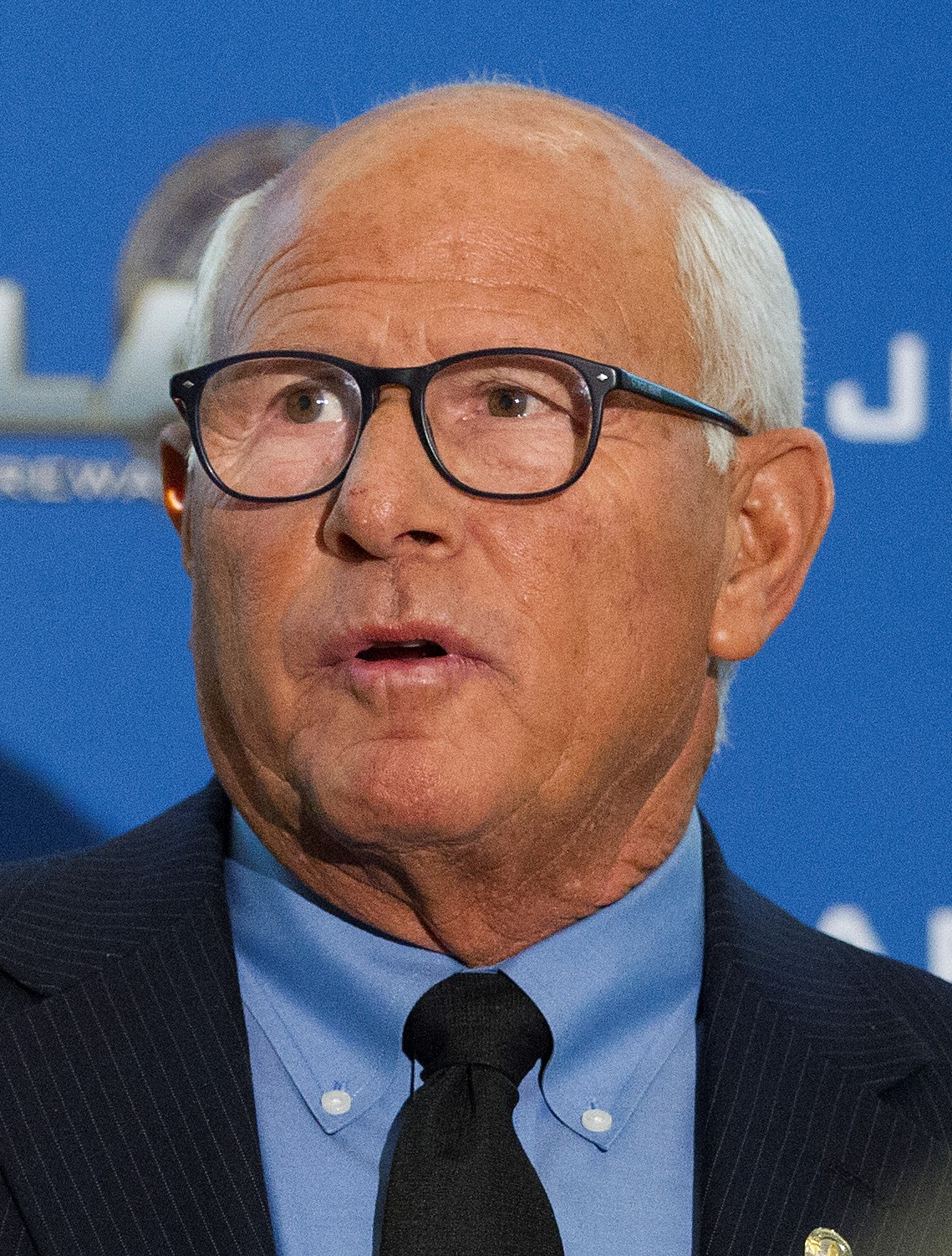

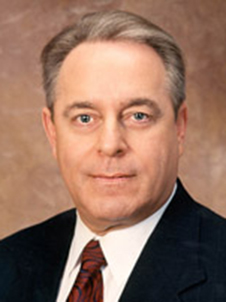

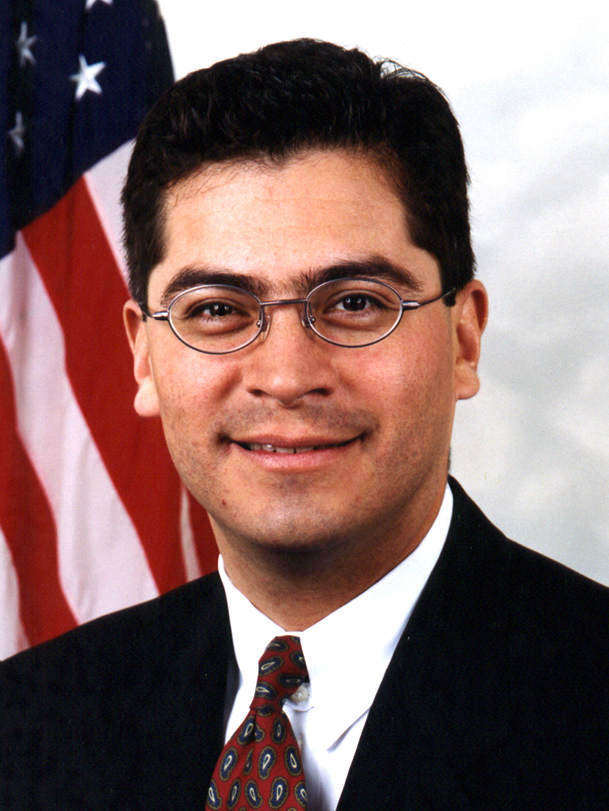
Candidate	James Hahn	Antonio Villaraigosa	Steve Soboroff
First round	125,139; 25.05%	152,031; 30.43%	106,189; 21.25%
Runoff	304,791; 53.53%	264,611; 46.47%	Eliminated
Candidate	Joel Wachs	Xavier Becerra
First round	55,016; 11.01%	29,851; 5.97%
Runoff	Eliminated	Eliminated
Mayor before election
Richard Riordan
Elected Mayor
James Hahn

The 2001 Los Angeles mayoral election was for a four-year term as mayor of Los Angeles, California. It took place on April 10, 2001, with a runoff on June 5, 2001. Incumbent mayor Richard Riordan was prevented from running for a third term because of term limits. In the election to replace him, then-City Attorney James Hahn defeated Antonio Villaraigosa, the former speaker of the California State Assembly.

Municipal elections in California, including for mayor of Los Angeles, are officially nonpartisan; candidates' party affiliations do not appear on the ballot.

== Candidates ==
- Martin Luther King Aubrey Sr.
- Xavier Becerra, U.S. representative
- Rob Black, pornographer
- Kathleen Connell, California state controller
- Francis Dellavecchia
- "Melrose" Larry Green
- James Hahn, Los Angeles city attorney since 1985
- Wendy Lyons
- Addie Mae Miller
- Steve Mozena
- Joe Shea, reporter and Hollywood secession activist
- Steve Soboroff, real estate developer
- Bob Tur, broadcast reporter and founder of Los Angeles News Service
- Antonio Villaraigosa, former speaker of the California State Assembly
- Joel Wachs, member of the Los Angeles City Council from Studio City and candidate for mayor in 1973 and 1993

=== Declined ===
- Richard Riordan, incumbent mayor since 1993 (endorsed Hahn, then Villaraigosa)

== Campaign ==
The primary election for mayor was held on April 10, 2001. Villaraigosa finished first, with 30 percent of the vote. Hahn was second with 25 percent of the vote. In Los Angeles city elections the top two vote-getters advance to a runoff if no contender reaches 50 percent in the primary.

Riordan had endorsed his senior advisor, Parks Commissioner and businessman Steve Soboroff, to replace him. Soboroff, the only prominent Republican in the race, finished third with 21 percent of the vote. Also competing in the primary election were longtime Los Angeles City Council member Joel Wachs, United States Representative Xavier Becerra, and California State Controller Kathleen Connell. Along with Hahn, they were all prominent Democrats. They finished with 11, 6 and 5 percent of the vote, respectively.

The Los Angeles Times made a dual endorsement of Hahn and Villaraigosa in the primary election, while the city's other daily newspapers, The Los Angeles Daily News and The Daily Breeze endorsed Soboroff.

Becerra's mayoral campaign ran a tape of someone impersonating Los Angeles County Supervisor Gloria Molina disparaging Villaraigosa's voting record in the state assembly. The tape was run by campaign staffer Lloyd Monserratt and, though no laws had been broken, this action tarnished the reputations of all involved.

== Results ==
Los Angeles mayoral primary election, April 10, 2001
Candidate	Votes	%
Antonio Villaraigosa	152,031	30.43
James Hahn	125,139	25.05
Steve Soboroff	106,189	21.25
Joel Wachs	55,016	11.01
Xavier Becerra	29,851	5.97
Kathleen Connell	24,062	4.82
Francis Dellavecchia	1,769	0.35
Martin Luther King Aubrey, Sr.	965	0.19
Melrose Larry Green	860	0.17
Wendy Lyons	813	0.16
Rob Black	789	0.16
Bob Tur	656	0.13
Joe Shea	645	0.13
Addie Mae Miller	540	0.11
Steve Mozena	316	0.06
Total votes	499,641	100.00

=== General election ===
Riordan switched his endorsement to Villaraigosa in the general election. Despite the popular Republican mayor's endorsement, as well as the endorsement of the Times, Villaraigosa was unable to capture a majority. Hahn won the general election on June 5, 2001 with 53.53 percent of the vote, to Villaraigosa's 46.47 percent.

Soboroff, Becerra and Connell remained neutral in the general election. Wachs endorsed Villaraigosa.

Los Angeles mayoral general election, June 5, 2001
Candidate	Votes	%
James Hahn	304,791	53.53
Antonio Villaraigosa	264,611	46.47
Total votes	569,402	100.00

== Further information ==
Hahn was sworn in as Los Angeles' 40th mayor in the summer of 2001. He faced Villaraigosa in a rematch in the 2005 mayoral election. In that race, Villaraigosa defeated Hahn to become the 41st mayor of Los Angeles.

Soboroff would go on to become a senior fellow at UCLA and the head of the Playa Vista development on Los Angeles' Westside, while Wachs became president of the Andy Warhol Foundation in New York City, and Connell was termed out of her post as state controller. Becerra remained a member of Congress until his appointment to succeed Senator Kamala Harris as attorney general of California in 2017.
