= 1997 Los Angeles mayoral election =

- April 8, 1997
- Turnout: 31.71%
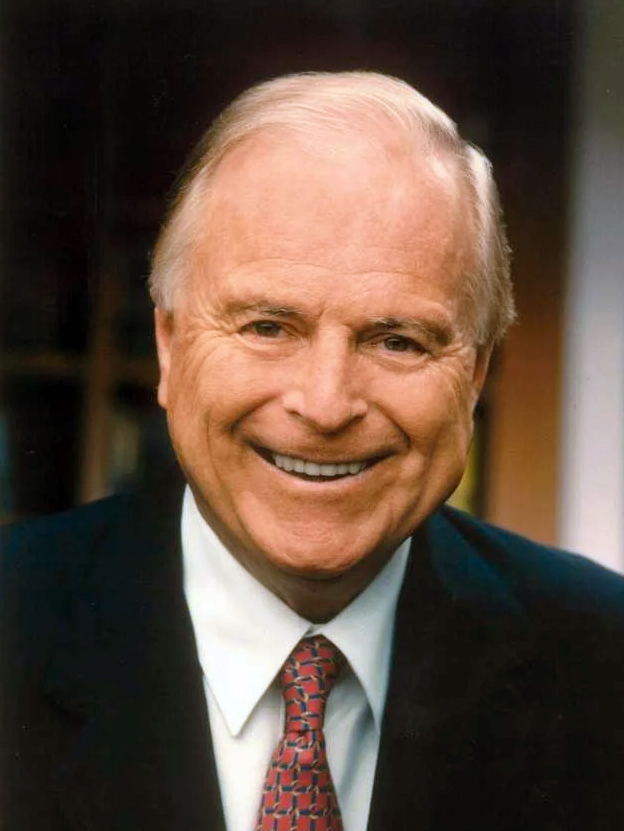

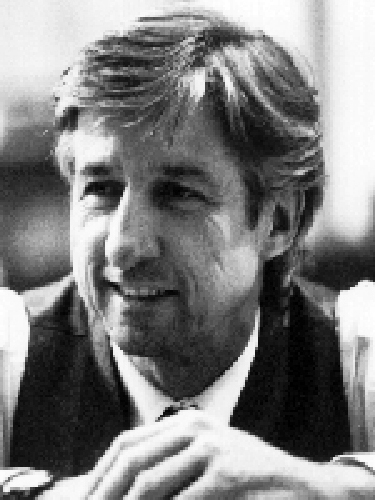
Candidate	Richard Riordan	Tom Hayden
Popular vote	250,771	140,648
Percentage	61.49%	34.49%
Mayor before election
Richard Riordan
Elected Mayor
Richard Riordan

The 1997 Los Angeles mayoral election took place on April 8, 1997. Incumbent Richard Riordan won re-election against California State Senator and activist Tom Hayden. As of to date, this is the most recent time a Republican was elected mayor of Los Angeles. Municipal elections in California, including mayor of Los Angeles, are officially nonpartisan; candidates' party affiliations do not appear on the ballot.

== Candidates ==
- Tom Hayden, state senator
- Craig A. Honts
- Candido J. Marez
- Richard Riordan, incumbent mayor since 1993
- Leonard Shapiro, candidate for governor in 1993

== Campaign ==
Hayden criticized Riordan for ignoring the environment and for not debating with him while Riordan criticized Hayden for his voting record as a state senator. Polls showed Riordan leading Hayden, with most of his support being from white people and Republicans. The Los Angeles County Federation of Labor pulled their support from Riordan and took a neutral stance for the two. In the election, Riordan won outright against Hayden and three other candidates.

== Results ==
Los Angeles mayoral general election, April 8, 1997
Candidate	Votes	%
Richard Riordan (incumbent)	250,771	61.49
Tom Hayden	140,648	34.49
Candido J. Marez	5,852	1.43
Leonard Shapiro	5,454	1.33
Craig A. Honts	5,065	1.24
Total votes	407,790	100.00
