= 2009 Los Angeles mayoral election =

- March 3, 2009
- Turnout: 17.90%
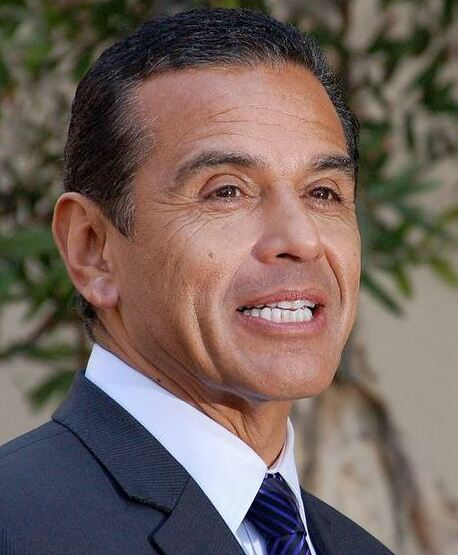

Candidate	Antonio Villaraigosa	Walter Moore	Gordon Turner
Popular vote	152,613	71,937	17,554
Percentage	55.7%	26.2%	6.4%
- Results by city council district Villaraigosa: 40–50% 50–60% 60–70% 70–80%
Mayor before election
Antonio Villaraigosa
Elected Mayor
Antonio Villaraigosa

The 2009 Los Angeles mayoral election took place on March 3, 2009. Incumbent mayor Antonio R. Villaraigosa was re-elected overwhelmingly and faced no serious opponent. He would have faced a run-off against second place-finisher Walter Moore had he failed to win a majority of the vote. Villaraigosa won the election despite having generally unfavorable approval ratings. He was credited with winning because more well-known and better-funded candidates, such as developer Rick Caruso, declined to run.

Municipal elections in California, including for mayor of Los Angeles, are officially nonpartisan; candidates' party affiliations do not appear on the ballot.

== Candidates ==
- Carlos Alvarez
- James Harris, perennial Socialist Workers Party candidate
- David R. Hernandez
- Phil Jennerjahn
- Walter Moore, attorney and candidate for mayor in 2005
- Craig X. Rubin
- David Saltzburg
- Stevan Torres
- Gordon Turner
- Antonio Villaraigosa, incumbent mayor since 2005

=== Declined ===
- Rick Caruso, real estate developer

== Results ==
Los Angeles mayoral general election, March 3, 2009
Candidate	Votes	%
Antonio Villaraigosa (incumbent)	152,613	55.65
Walter Moore	71,937	26.23
Gordon Turner	17,554	6.40
David "Zuma Dogg" Saltzburg	9,115	3.32
Stevan Torres	9,114	3.31
David R. Hernandez	5,225	1.91
Craig X. Rubin	4,158	1.51
Carlos Alvarez	3,047	1.11
James Harris	2,461	0.90
Phil Jennerjahn	2,432	0.89
Total votes	274,233	100.00
