= Joseph Cari Jr. =

American merchant banker, public policy consultant, and philanthropist

Joseph Cari
- Born: Chicago, Illinois, U.S.
- Citizenship: United States; Italy
- Education: University of Notre Dame (BA, JD)
- Children: Nicole Elizabeth Cari
- Website: Official website

Joseph A. Cari Jr. is an American merchant banker, public policy consultant, and philanthropist. He has served in leadership roles with U.S. policy institutions and has been active in international finance and healthcare investment.

== Early life ==
Cari, an Italian American, was raised in Chicago, Illinois. He is the son of Dr. Joseph and Elaine Cari, and has three siblings. His father was a physician and surgeon who chaired the Department of Family Medicine at Mercy Hospital Medical Center in Chicago and also served as Chief Medical Officer for the Chicago Fire Department.

Cari graduated cum laude from the University of Notre Dame with a B.A. degree in sociology. As an undergraduate, he played on the varsity baseball team and was president of Fisher Hall. In 1978, he earned a J.D. from the University of Notre Dame Law School. He later completed a fellowship at the Institute of Politics at the John F. Kennedy School of Government at Harvard University.

== Career ==
In 1999, U.S. President Bill Clinton appointed Cari as chairman of the Woodrow Wilson International Center for Scholars. During his tenure, he worked on policy programming and supported bipartisan participation in the Center’s initiatives.

Cari has been associated with the World Policy Institute and has participated in meetings of the World Economic Forum in Davos, Switzerland. His commentary on foreign policy has appeared in publications including the Financial Times, Chicago Tribune, and Chicago Sun-Times.

In business, Cari has worked in healthcare and clean energy finance. He has served on the board of Westlake New Energy Group in Europe and on advisory boards for financial and technology ventures in London and Washington, D.C.

== Federal plea agreement ==
In 2005, Cari entered into a plea agreement in a case brought by the U.S. Attorney’s office in Chicago for attempted extortion under 18 U.S.C § 1951. In April 2013, the Court, with agreement from prosecutors, commuted his sentence.

== Personal life ==
Cari married his second wife, Rita Bahr, a corporate lawyer who specialized in mergers and acquisitions for Motorola Corporation. She died in 2002. He has one daughter from his first marriage, Nicole Soboroff, married to journalist Jacob Soboroff.
