= Richard Riordan =

American businessman and politician (1930–2023)

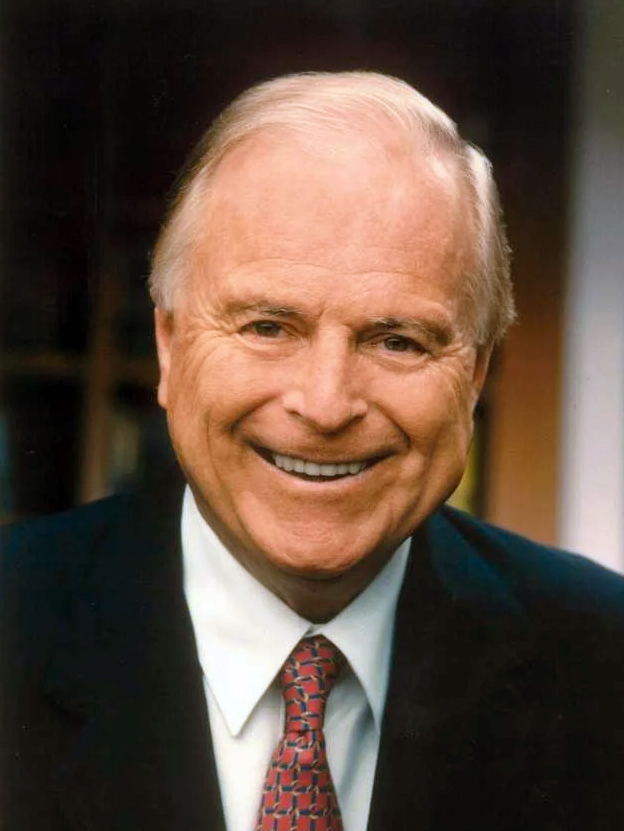
- Official portrait, 1997

39th Mayor of Los Angeles
- In office July 1, 1993 – July 1, 2001
- Preceded by: Tom Bradley
- Succeeded by: James Hahn

Personal details
- Born: Richard Joseph Riordan; May 1, 1930 New York City U.S.
- Died: April 19, 2023 (aged 92) Los Angeles, California, U.S.
- Party: Republican
- Spouses: Eugenia Warady (m. 1955; ann. 1977) Jill Noel (m. 1980; div. 1998) Nancy Daly (m. 1998; died 2009) Elizabeth Gregory (m. 2017)
- Children: 5
- Education: Princeton University (AB); University of Michigan (JD)

Military service
- Allegiance: United States
- Branch/service: United States Army
- Years of service: 1952–1955
- Rank: First lieutenant
- Battles/wars: Korean War
- Richard Riordan's voice Richard Riordan on the response to the 1994 Northridge earthquake Recorded March 7, 1994

Richard Joseph Riordan (May 1, 1930 – April 19, 2023) was an American businessman, investor, military commander, philanthropist, and politician. A decorated Korean War veteran and a member of the Republican Party, Riordan served as the 39th mayor of Los Angeles from 1993 to 2001; he remains the most recent Republican to hold that office. He ran for governor in the 2002 California gubernatorial election, losing the Republican primary. After politics, he resumed his business career, specializing in private equity. Riordan was considered a moderate Republican.

== Early life, education, and career ==
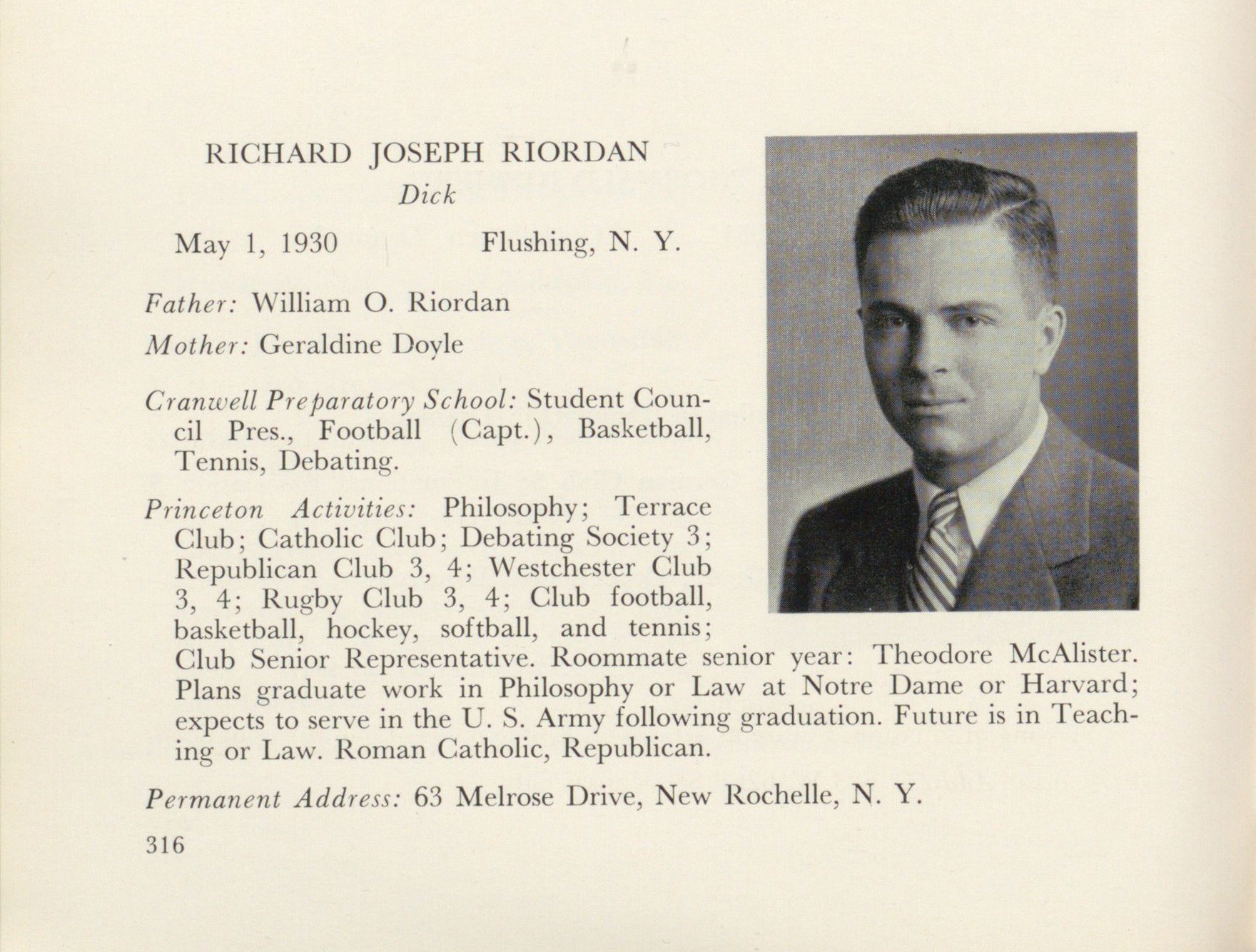
Riordan in the Princeton University yearbook, 1952

Riordan was born on May 1, 1930, in Flushing, Queens, to an Irish-American family, the son of Geraldine (Doyle) and William O. Riordan. He was the youngest of their nine children. After growing up in New Rochelle, New York, he first enrolled at Santa Clara University on a football scholarship, but transferred to Princeton University, where he graduated in 1952 with an A.B. in philosophy. His senior thesis was titled "A Study of the Thomistic Faculty Psychology." He then served in the U.S. Army as a first lieutenant during the Korean War. After leaving the military, he earned a J.D. from The University of Michigan Law School in 1956.

That year, he moved to Los Angeles, joining the downtown law firm of O'Melveny & Myers. In 1959, he left to become a partner of Nossaman LLP. In 1975, he was a founding partner of the law firm Riordan & McKinzie, which merged with Bingham McCutchen in 2003.

Riordan began investing in the 1950s with an $80,000 inheritance from his father, which he eventually grew into a multimillion dollar fortune. In 1982, he was a founder of the private equity firm Riordan, Lewis & Haden. As a philanthropist, he founded the Riordan Foundation, a charity for expanding childhood literacy.

== Mayor of Los Angeles ==
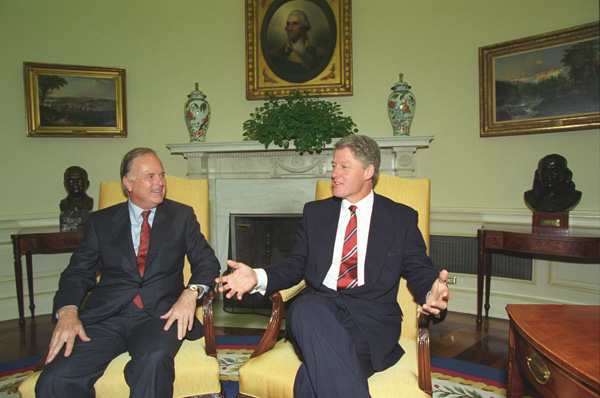
Riordan with President Bill Clinton in 1993

When Tom Bradley announced he was retiring as mayor of Los Angeles after 20 years in office, Riordan set his sights on the 1993 election. Riordan won with 54% of the vote over Los Angeles City Councilman Michael Woo, becoming the first Republican mayor in 36 years. As Mayor, the heavily Democratic Los Angeles City Council blocked many of his proposals, or they proved unfeasible in reality. For example, the police academy did not have enough classroom space or instructors to train as many new police officers as Riordan had initially promised. He streamlined certain business regulations and established "one-stop" centers around the city for services, like permit applications.

Riordan feuded with police chief Daryl Gates' successor, former Philadelphia police commissioner Willie Williams, but oversaw a general decline in city crime. Ultimately, Riordan replaced Williams with LAPD veteran Bernard Parks in 1997, the year he was easily re-elected mayor over controversial state Senator Tom Hayden.

Riordan's tenure was marked by controversy over the Los Angeles County Metropolitan Transportation Authority's Red Line subway's construction cost overruns. Because the overruns resulted in MTA funds being reallocated from bus funding, the Bus Riders Union sued the city, alleging racial discrimination, resulting in a 1996 consent decree that eviscerated MTA funding for subway and light rail construction projects. Riordan publicly stated that he regretted signing the consent decree and it was his biggest mistake as mayor.

Before becoming mayor, Riordan spearheaded the city's successful term limit ballot initiative and he was therefore term-limited from office in 2001. Riordan endorsed his adviser and friend, Steve Soboroff, to succeed him. Soboroff, however, came in third in the non-partisan mayoral primary election. Former California State Assembly Speaker Antonio Villaraigosa advanced to the runoff against Los Angeles City Attorney James Hahn. Riordan endorsed Villaraigosa in the second round, but Hahn won and succeeded him as mayor. Four years later, Villaraigosa defeated Hahn in the 2005 rematch and became Mayor.

== 2002 California gubernatorial race ==
In 2002, Riordan decided to seek the governorship. In the Republican primary election, he faced conservative businessman Bill Simon and former California Secretary of State Bill Jones. Although Riordan had a 30-point lead early in the race, Simon beat him by 18 points. Riordan's loss mainly can be attributed to a conservative Republican party base that rejected his moderate Republicanism and efforts to move the party to the political center. Incumbent Democratic Governor Gray Davis felt he had a much better chance to beat Simon, so he spent millions of dollars running attack ads against Riordan in the Republican primary. Davis's cross-party strategy was successful. Riordan lost the primary, and Davis defeated Simon 47%–42% in the general election.

== The Los Angeles Examiner ==
In early 2003, Riordan circulated a prototype of a locally-focused, sophisticated, and politically-independent weekly newspaper, The Los Angeles Examiner, he hoped to start publishing in June. It was, however, never published. Riordan put the project on hold when Governor Arnold Schwarzenegger, who defeated Gray Davis in the October 2003 recall election, appointed him California Secretary of Education. He served in the position from 2003 until he resigned in 2005.

== Later political involvement ==
Riordan continued to be involved in city politics after his mayoralty. In the 2001 Los Angeles mayoral election, Riordan endorsed his friend and adviser Steve Soboroff in the primary and Antonio Villaraigosa in the general election. In 2005, he backed former State Assembly Speaker Robert Hertzberg in the primary and Antonio Villaraigosa in the general election. In both races, he chose not to endorse James Hahn.

Riordan played a role in City Council elections, supporting Bill Rosendahl, who won election in the Eleventh District in 2005; Monica Rodriguez, who lost to Seventh District Councilman Richard Alarcon in 2007; and Adeena Bleich, who lost to Paul Koretz and David Vahedi, who advanced to the runoff election. In 2013, Riordan endorsed Los Angeles City Controller Wendy Greuel for mayor. She ultimately was defeated by then-Council member Eric Garcetti.

== Personal life and legacy ==
The Richard J. Riordan Central Library in Los Angeles is named after him. Riordan owned the Original Pantry Cafe, which operated in Los Angeles from 1924 to 2025, and Gladstones Malibu, which has been open since 1972.

Riordan was married four times and had five children, two of whom predeceased him; William "Billy" O'Brien, Mary Elizabeth, Kathleen Ann, Patrica "Trish" Ann, and Carol Ann. Billy drowned in a scuba diving mishap at age 21 while trying to get shellfish to cook for his friends in 1978, and Carol died of cardiac arrest resulting from complications of anorexia at age 18 in 1982. Riordan died at his home in Brentwood on April 19, 2023 at age 92.
