= Steve Soboroff =

American businessman and philanthropist

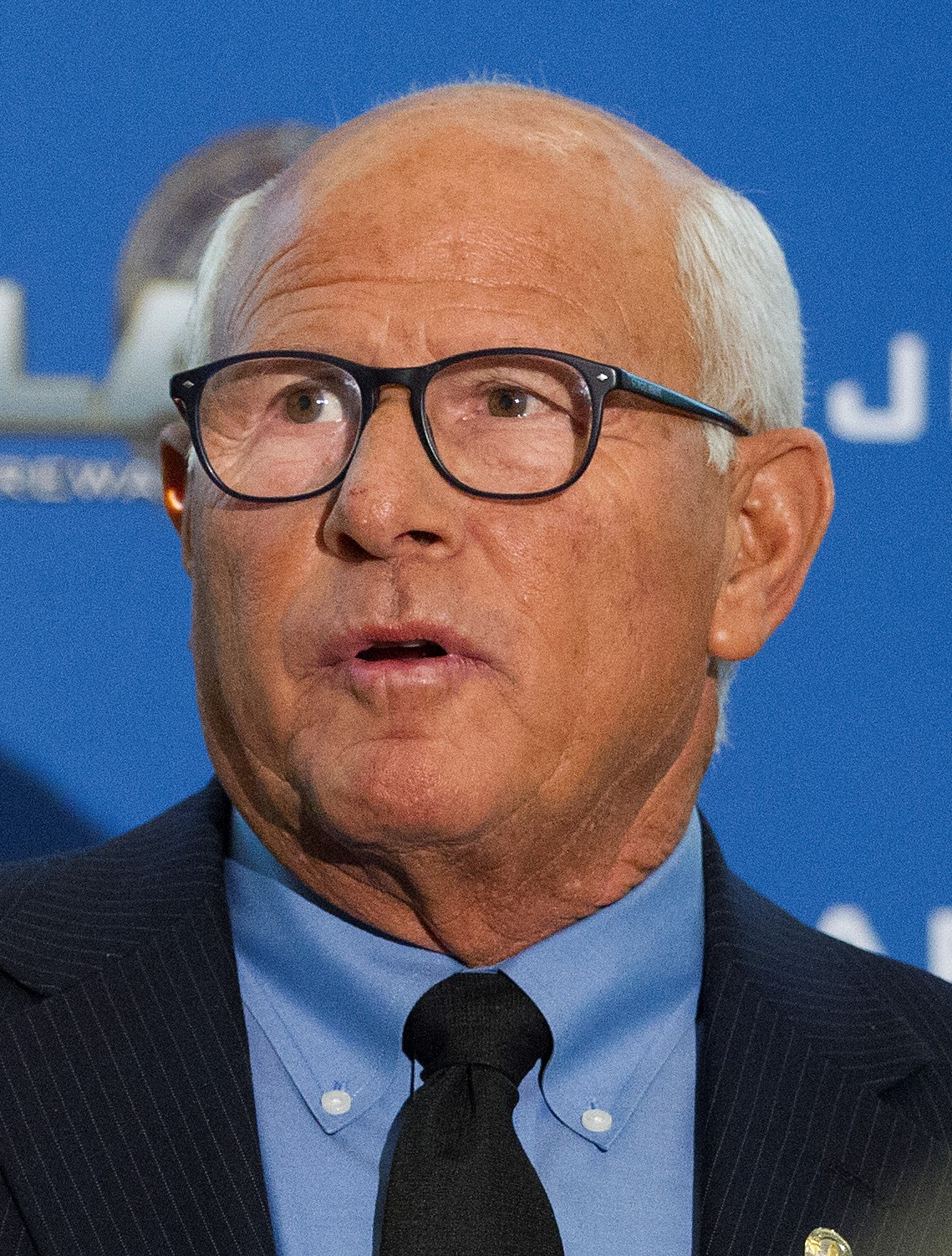
- Soboroff in 2014
- Born: August 31, 1948 (age 78); Chicago, Illinois, U.S.
- Education: University of Arizona (BS, MS)
- Political party: Republican
- Spouse: Patti Schertzer
- Children: 5, including Jacob

Steve Soboroff (born August 31, 1948) is an American businessperson who served as a Los Angeles Police commissioner from 2013 to 2023. Soboroff was president of the Los Angeles Recreation and Parks Commission between 1995 and 2000. He was a member of the L.A. Harbor Commission and worked as senior advisor to Los Angeles Mayor Richard Riordan. Soboroff ran for mayor of Los Angeles in the 2001 election, placing third.

Soboroff was the chairman and CEO of Playa Vista. He was on the board of the Weingart Foundation for 22 years, seven of which he was chairman, and served for 20 years on the board of MaceRich Company (NYSE). In September 2011 he was appointed by the California Science Center to be the senior advisor to the museum in its project with NASA to bring, and permanently exhibit, the Space Shuttle Endeavour. He is chairman of the Maccabiah Games Committee of 18. Soboroff was chairman of the Center for the Study of Los Angeles at Loyola Marymount University, and was a senior fellow and member of the advisory board at UCLA Luskin School of Public Affairs.

== Early life and education ==
Soboroff was raised in a middle-class, secular Jewish family in Chicago, the son of Evelyn and Irving Soboroff. His father's hat manufacturing business declined in the 1960s and the family moved first to Arkansas and then to California, where his parents opened the successful Shaxted linen boutique in Beverly Hills. In 1966, Soboroff graduated from Taft High School in Woodland Hills, Los Angeles. He tried to enlist during the Vietnam War but was denied for medical reasons. He earned Bachelor of Science and Master of Science degrees from the University of Arizona. During the summers, he worked as a chauffeur and assistant for Kirk Douglas, whose wife Anne was a frequent customer of the Shaxted linen boutique.

== Career ==
While in college, Soboroff's father had introduced him to J. K. Eichenbaum, a Los Angeles-based real estate developer who specialized in shopping centers. In 1971, Soboroff went to work for Eichenbaum. In 1979, Soboroff left Eichenbaum's company and began to lease and renovate retail areas on his own.

=== STAPLES Center ===
Soboroff is widely credited as the driving force behind the development of STAPLES Center in downtown Los Angeles, having come up with a plan, as senior advisor to Mayor Riordan, to bring the Los Angeles Lakers, the Los Angeles Kings and the Los Angeles Clippers to the heart of downtown Los Angeles.

=== 2001 Los Angeles mayoral election ===
Soboroff entered the 2001 mayoral primary election, and received Riordan's endorsement. Soboroff placed third in the primary, coming within 3% of eventual winner James K. Hahn. Hahn and former California State Assembly Speaker Antonio Villaraigosa advanced to the runoff.

In 2005, many of the traffic-fighting proposals Soboroff introduced during his 2001 campaign, as well as his plan to break up the Los Angeles Unified School District (LAUSD), were reintroduced by other candidates in that year's mayoral contest. Later in 2005, newly elected Los Angeles Mayor Antonio Villaraigosa, with whom Soboroff competed for the mayor's job in 2001, implemented Soboroff's proposal to ban all road construction during rush hour. Villaraigosa's 2005 and 2009 campaign manager, Ace Smith, played the same role for Soboroff in 2001.

=== Playa Vista ===
In October 2001, Soboroff joined Playa Vista as the community's president and CEO. He oversaw the development of 20 parks, an elementary school, offices, the Honey Training Center, residences, and other amenities, which has resulted in one of the most popular neighborhoods in Los Angeles. The wetlands were preserved and major traffic mitigation improvements were established.

=== Los Angeles Dodgers ===
On April 19, 2011, Soboroff was hired as vice chairman of the Los Angeles Dodgers. His responsibilities were said to include leading the efforts to improve the fan experience and strengthening the team's ties to the community.

One day later, Major League Baseball seized control of the Dodgers from owner Frank McCourt. He resigned his position on June 25, 2011, citing the "unanticipated action by the commissioner of Major League Baseball" as preventing him from doing the job for which he had been hired.

== Personal life ==
In 1982, he married Patti Schertzer. They have five children: Jacob (1983), Miles (1985), Molly (1987), Hannah (1988), and Leah (1993). and nine grandchildren.

Soboroff was widely known as the foremost collector of typewriters that were previously owned by famous individuals. Six, including those of Maya Angelou and John Lennon, were donated to The Smithsonian in Washington, D.C. and others to Planet Word in Washington, D.C., and the American Writers Museum in Chicago.

Soboroff joined Big Brothers Big Sisters of America as a college student and was matched with then-nine-year-old Terry Alan Williams. In 2026, the pair celebrated their 58th year as a match. In 2022, Soboroff was inducted into the National Big Brothers Big Sisters of America Alumni Hall of Fame.
