= Walter Moore (politician) =

American lawyer and political candidate

- Born: 1959 (age 66–67); Virginia
- Education: Princeton University, B.A., cum laude, Public and International Affairs; Georgetown University Law Center, J.D., cum laude
- Occupation: Attorney
- Website: Official Website

Walter Whitman Moore (born 1959 in Virginia) is an American lawyer and political figure, who was the runner-up for Mayor of Los Angeles in the city's 2009 election. An independent who alternated between political parties, he also competed in the 2005 Los Angeles mayoral election.

== Life and career ==
Moore graduated with honors from Princeton University in 1981, with a degree in Public and International Affairs from the Woodrow Wilson School. While at Princeton he was voted the "most outstanding senior in the American Whig Cliosophic Literary and Debating Society; president of the Woodrow Wilson Honorary Debate Panel; director of the on-topic program this year; Vendevelt award for most outstanding junior in his policy conference; and a David Lawrence scholarship, awarded by U.S. News & World Report, for his junior year." He subsequently graduated with honors from Georgetown University Law Center in 1984, and was an Editor of the Georgetown Law Journal. He passed the California Bar in 1984, and has been practicing law ever since then. Moore represents individuals, partnerships, and corporations in a wide variety of business disputes. He is also a licensed real estate broker.

Moore and his wife Judy, an international property manager, live in Pasadena and own a townhouse in the South of France. They have no children.

== Politics ==
In 2009, Moore challenged Antonio Villaraigosa. Moore's mayoral platform included repealing the City's business income tax; ending what he called "corporate welfare" in the form of subsidies and special tax breaks for politically connected businesses; abolishing programs he considered wasteful (such as calligraphy and anti-gang programs that give tax dollars to ex-gang members); hiring enough police to make every neighborhood safe; opposing increased housing density; opposing rate hikes, fee hikes and tax hikes; and making the City's animal shelters "no kill."

In the 2009 election, Moore raised hundreds of thousands of dollars for his campaign, which was enough to qualify for matching funds. However, Villaraigosa raised 15 times more money, and received twice as many votes. Despite being relatively unknown at the time of the election, Moore received the endorsements of several organizations.

Besides running for mayor, Moore has written the official ballot argument against various City propositions that would raise taxes. He also wrote and gathered signatures to support "Jamiel's Law," a proposal to deny "sanctuary city" protection to gang members who are in the country illegally.
