= Joe Shea =

American reporter

- Born: February 7, 1947; Goshen, New York
- Died: October 19, 2016 (aged 69)
- Occupation: Reporter
- Political party: Libertarian (2001)

Joe Shea (February 7, 1947 – October 19, 2016) was editor-in-chief of The American Reporter, the first daily Internet newspaper, started on April 10, 1995. Shea was the named plaintiff in the landmark First Amendment case, Shea v Reno, which ended with the Communications Decency Act and its proposed censorship of the Internet declared unconstitutional in Manhattan Federal Court and affirmed in the U. S. Supreme Court in 1997. He is a noted community activist whose efforts to clean up a dangerous neighborhood in Hollywood, California were praised by authorities as a national model for Neighborhood Watch. His defiance of the Clinton Administration on the censorship law was featured in "A Day In the Life of The Internet".

Shea was born in Goshen, New York, to Mr. & Mrs. John S. Shea, Jr., of Monroe and New York City. His grandfather John S. Shea was elected Sheriff of New York in 1909, the first Republican to be elected in Manhattan since Reconstruction and the last until his uncle, William F. Shea, was elected to the bench in 1954.

Joe Shea also started the Committee to Draft U.S. Senator John Kerry which sought to get the Massachusetts senator into the 1988 Presidential race.

== Journalism ==
Joe Shea started out in journalism by covering the 1968 New York City riot the night of the April 4 assassination of Martin Luther King Jr., submitting his first article in longhand to the Village Voice where it was selected by editor Ross Wetzsteon over 18 other submissions from New Left writers including Dave Dellinger and Michael Harrington. He worked for the Village Voice as a freelance war correspondent in Northern Ireland, India, Vietnam and the Philippines, and was responsible in 1976 for the withdrawal of President Gerald Ford's nomination of Patrick Delaney to the Securities Exchange Commission after the Village Voice published his article revealing inconsistencies in Delaney's resume.

Shea also wrote an article linking Nelson Rockefeller, then Governor of New York, to a Bolivian diplomat, Victor Andrade, whom the U.S. Office of Strategic Services had identified as a "front for Nazis" in the cabinet of Bolivian President Paz Estenssoro. He later worked on the staff at Esquire Magazine, where he was responsible for a suggestion that became a regular feature of the magazine called "Reckless Advice", which became a book by Lee Eisenberg. Shea rolled a coin across his fingers on both hands while tap-dancing and singing "The Impossible Dream" on the Gong Show in 1978, and also wrote about the experience for the Village Voice.

His most important investigative article was a cover story for the L.A. Weekly in Nov., 1989, describing the large influx of monied Iranians into Beverly Hills, where they altered the economic and sociocultural underpinnings of one of the world's wealthiest cities.

In a Village Voice article, "Are Delaney & Son A New Washington Partnership?", Shea told of an extensive stock fraud in which President Gerald Ford's nominee to the Securities Exchange Commission was involved. Patrick Delaney was the son of the ranking bipartisan-endorsed member of the House Rules Committee, Rep. John Delaney. The article exposed the pair's profit from the fraud and that the younger Delaney had lied about a degree from Georgetown. The article led to the withdrawal of Delaney's nomination, and the elder Delaney, who admitted to Shea that he "may have" made $100,000 in the Westec stock fraud, chose not to run for office again. His seat was won by Geraldine Ferraro, who became the first major-party female nominee for vice president just two years later. The article had the effect of preventing the appointment of an SEC member who might be open to blackmail and of producing a vacancy that was filled by a history-making candidate.

In addition, he wrote for Bert Sugar's Argosy Magazine and many other publications, including the Los Angeles Times, San Francisco Chronicle and Los Angeles Daily News, where he contributed op-ed articles. He was the executive speech writer consultant at Lockheed Corp. in 1977 as the company sought to make the $800-million "Deal of the Century" for the L1011 passenger jet with Pan Am. He wrote three speeches, including one broadcast nationally on Town Hall and one to the American Society of Financial Analysts for Lockheed Chairman Roy Anderson, and one for Lockheed President Larry Kitchen, an address to the National Aeronautic Association. The sale of the L10ll to Pan Am saved the company.

== Activism ==
As a community activist, Joe Shea served for 13 years as president of the Ivar Hill Community Association and was the subject of numerous television documentaries by Fox News and CNN, among others. The association provided fresh meals and hand-wrapped Christmas gifts for more than 7,000 of Hollywood's poorest children during his years as president. He appeared frequently on television as a community leader and was frequently quoted in the Los Angeles Times during his 10-year effort as leader of the Ivar Hawks Neighborhood Watch to reduce the high rate of violent crime in Hollywood during the 1990s. LAPD officials hailed the group as a "national model" for Neighborhood Watch and credited the group with at least 16 citizen's arrests of drug dealers.

In 2001, Shea was hailed for his leadership by Los Angeles Police Chief Bernard Parks in an LAPD press release. In addition, Shea was a leading member of the group that put Hollywood's secession on the 2001 Los Angeles city ballot, and was a candidate for the proposed city's city council whose eloquent speech to the county Board of Supervisors in support of cityhood was aired on National Public Radio. In addition, Shea ran in 2000 as a candidate for Mayor of Los Angeles supporting the secession movement.

== Writing and acting ==
Joe's collection of Shakespearean sonnets, "A Native Music", was published in 1989, and he appeared at the Zephyr Theater in Los Angeles for a three-week run reading a selection of them. He won the Greater Los Angeles Press Club's First Prize for the Best Internet News Story of 2000, in which he revealed the inside secrets of a pyramid scheme and was instrumental in securing seven no-contest pleas from perpetrators of the infamous multimillion-dollar "Family & Friends" fraud.

Shea appeared as The Tourist in the original Brooklyn Academy of Music production of Robert Wilson's 12-hour opera, "The Life and Times of Joseph Stalin", in 1976.
