= Rossetti Architects =

American architectural design and planning firm

ROSSETTI
- Industry: Architecture
- Founded: 1969; 57 years ago
- Founder: Gino Rossetti
- Headquarters: 160 W. Fort St. Detroit, Michigan, United States
- Services: Sports, events, conference and exhibition centre architecture; Interior design; Environmental Branding; Wayfinding; Overlay; Masterplanning; Landscape Architecture; Sustainable design consulting; Facilities operations analysis
- Owner: Matt Rossetti
- Website: www.rossetti.com

ROSSETTI is an American architectural design and planning firm headquartered in Detroit, Michigan.

== History ==
ROSSETTI is a privately owned architectural firm that was founded in Detroit, in 1969, by Gino Rossetti. In 1999, the firm's ownership was passed onto his son, Matt Rossetti. The firm's early projects centered on health care facilities, corporate headquarters, interiors, retail and master planning. The firm began approaching the sports and entertainment industry after ROSSETTI was contracted in 1984 to design The Palace of Auburn Hills.

Today, ROSSETTI works with clients worldwide on a wide variety of projects, with a focus on sports and entertainment. ROSSETTI's focus globally is in Asia and Europe.

On April 28, 2026, it was announced that ROSSETTI was acquired by HOK.

== Projects ==
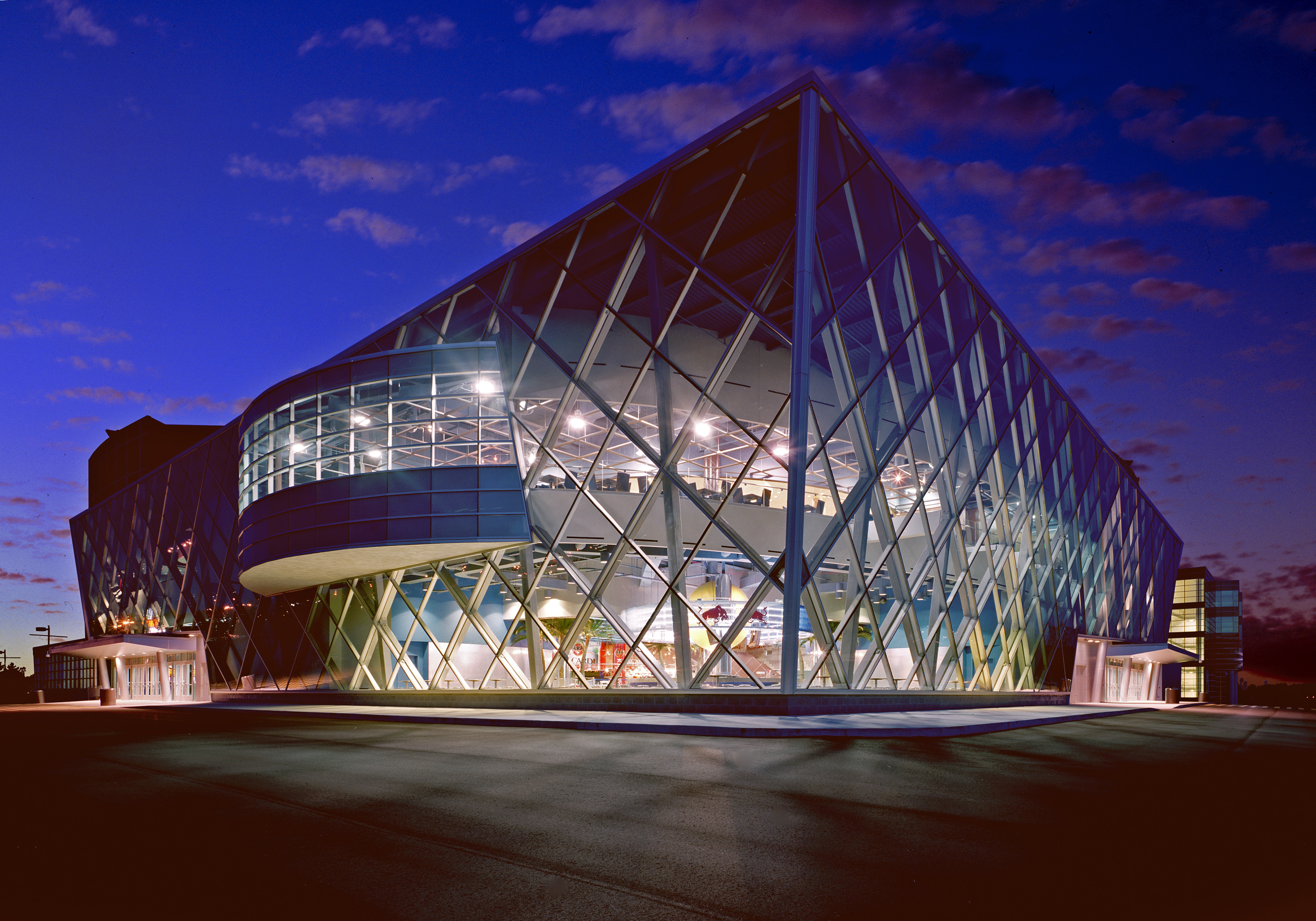
Palace Of Auburn Hills Michigan

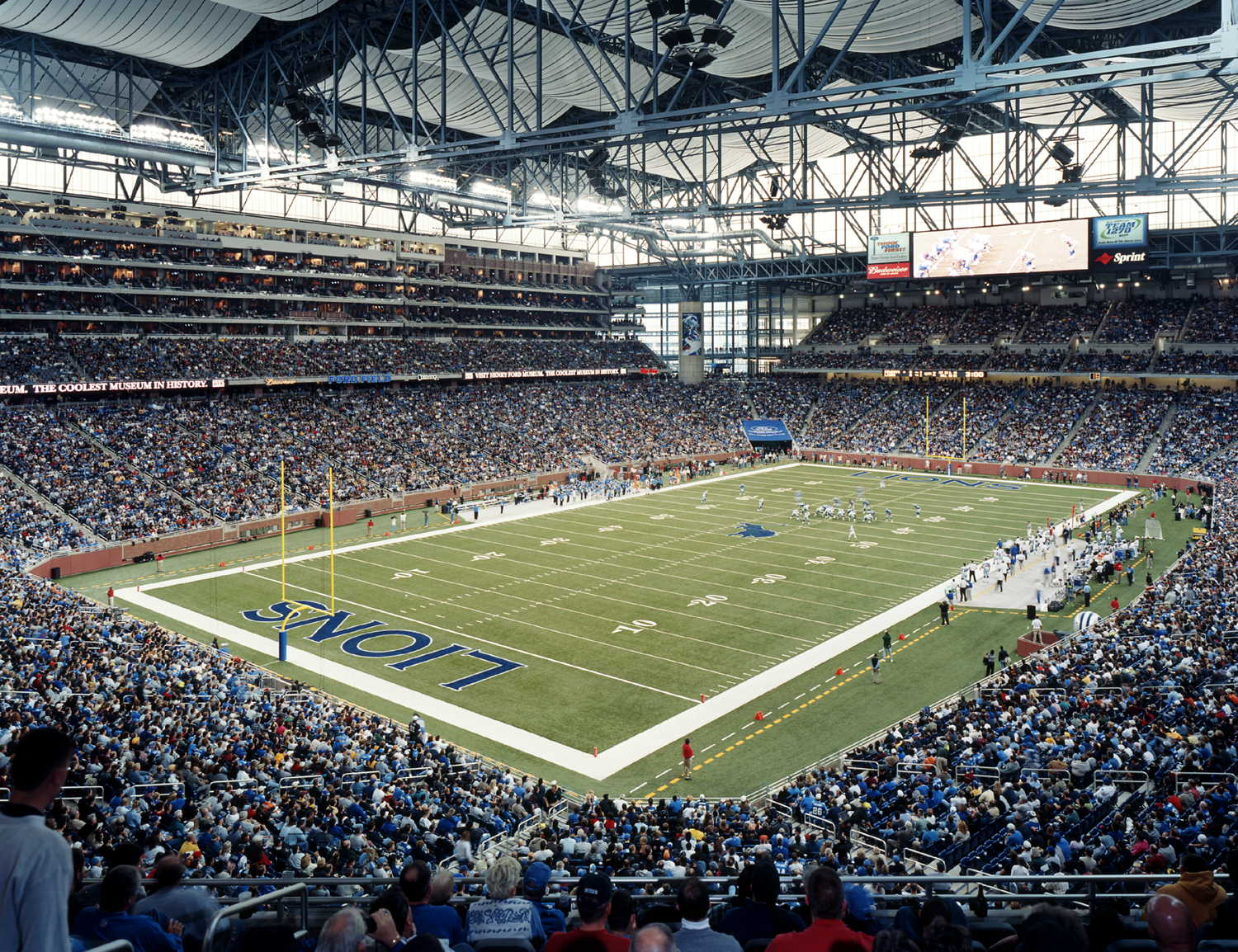
Ford Field, Detroit, Michigan

- Daytona International Speedway
- The Palace of Auburn Hills (lower seating bowl hospitality suites)
- Return on Design

=== College basketball ===
- Stroh Center, Bowling Green, Ohio – Bowling Green Falcons (2011)
- Convocation Center, Ypsilanti, Michigan – Eastern Michigan Eagles (1998)
- Ted Constant Convocation Center, Norfolk, Virginia – Old Dominion Monarchs (2002)
- Marriott Center, Provo, Utah – Brigham Young University Cougars (2011)
- Cobo Arena, Detroit, Michigan – University of Detroit

=== College football ===
- FIU Stadium, Miami, Florida – FIU Panthers (1995)

=== College hockey ===
- Yost Ice Arena, Ann Arbor, Michigan – Michigan Wolverines (2010)
- Compton Family Ice Arena, Notre Dame, Indiana – Notre Dame Fighting Irish (2011)
- Lynah Rink, Ithaca, New York – Cornell Big Red (2004)
- Von Braun Center, Huntsville, Alabama – University of Alabama-Huntsville (2003)
- Ridder Arena, Minneapolis, Minnesota – Minnesota Golden Gophers (2002)
- MacInnes Student Ice Arena, Houghton, Michigan – Michigan Tech Huskies (2007)
- Taffy Abel Arena, Sault Ste. Marie, Michigan – Lake Superior State Lakers (1996)

=== College soccer ===
- Fifth Third Bank Stadium, Kennesaw, Georgia – Kennesaw State Owls (2010)

=== International stadiums ===
- Incheon Football Stadium, Incheon, South Korea – Incheon United (2012)
- Tele2 Arena, Johanneshov, Stockholm, Sweden – Djurgårdens IF (2013)-in partnership with White Architects

=== Minor league hockey ===
- Van Andel Arena, Grand Rapids, Michigan – Grand Rapids Griffins (1996)
- Rabobank Arena, Bakersfield, California – Bakersfield Condors (1997)
- LC Walker Arena, Renovation, Muskegon, Michigan – – Muskegon Lumberjacks (2018)

=== MLS soccer stadiums ===
- Dignity Health Sports Park, Carson, California – LA Galaxy (2003)
- Toyota Park, Bridgeview, Illinois – Chicago Fire (2006)
- America First Field (formerly Rio Tinto Stadium), Sandy, Utah – Real Salt Lake (2008)
- Subaru Park (formerly Talen Energy Stadium), Chester, Pennsylvania – Philadelphia Union (2010)
- Red Bull Arena, Harrison, New Jersey – New York Red Bulls (2010)

=== Motor sports ===
- Michigan International Speedway, Renovations, Brooklyn, Michigan – International Speedway Corporation (1999)*
- Daytona International Speedway, Daytona Beach, Florida – International Speedway Corporation (2016)*
- ISM Raceway, Avondale, Arizona – International Speedway Corporation (2018)*

=== NBA ===
- The Palace of Auburn Hills, Auburn Hills, Michigan – Detroit Pistons (1988)
- TD Garden, Boston, Massachusetts – Boston Celtics (2014)
- Quicken Loans Arena, Cleveland, Ohio – Cleveland Cavaliers (2018)

=== NBA training facilities ===
- Los Angeles Clippers Training Center, Los Angeles, California – Los Angeles Clippers (2005)
- Cleveland Cavaliers Clinic Courts, Independence, Ohio – Cleveland Cavaliers (2007)
- Los Angeles Lakers Training Facility + Headquarters, El Segundo, California – Los Angeles Lakers (2017)
- Entertainment and Sports Arena, Washington D.C. – Washington Wizards (2018)
- Henry Ford Detroit Pistons Performance Center, Detroit, Michigan – Detroit Pistons (2019)

=== NFL ===
- Ford Field, Detroit, Michigan – Detroit Lions (2002)
- CenturyLink Field Renovations, Seattle, Washington – Seattle Seahawks Seattle Sounders FC (2014)
- CenturyLink Field Pressbox Suites, Seattle, Washington – Seattle Seahawks (2016)

=== NHL ===
- Canadian Tire Centre, Ottawa, Ontario – Ottawa Senators (1996)

=== Tennis ===
- USTA Billie Jean King National Tennis Center, Flushing Meadows, New York – United States Tennis Association (1996)
- Indian Wells Tennis Garden, Indian Wells, California (2000)
- Tennis Center at Crandon Park, Miami, Florida (1992)

=== Community projects ===
- Cobo Center, Detroit, Michigan (1960)
- Top of Troy, Troy, Michigan (1975)
- Riverplace Lofts, Detroit, Michigan (2006)
- Federal Reserve Bank of Chicago Detroit Branch Building, Detroit, Michigan (2013)
- Compuware World Headquarters, Detroit, Michigan (2003)
- The Qube, Detroit, Michigan (2012)
- Riverplace Lofts, Detroit, Michigan (2011)
- COBO Center, Detroit, Michigan (2013)
- The Albert, Detroit, Michigan (2014)
- Downtown Boxing Gym Youth Program, Detroit, Michigan (2015)
- Vertical Detroit, Detroit, Michigan (2015)
- Jim Brady's Detroit, Royal Oak, Michigan (2015)
- Rebol Brew Bar, Cleveland, Ohio (2016)
- Varnum Law, Detroit, Michigan (2016)
- Rocket Fiber, Detroit, Michigan (2016)
- International Bancard, Detroit, Michigan (2016)
- Maru Sushi, Detroit, Michigan (2016)
- Jim Brady's, Ann Arbor, Michigan (2018)
- One Campus Martius, Renovation, Detroit, Michigan (2018)
