= HeritageWest Credit Union =

- Formerly: Tooele Federal Credit Union
- Founded: 1948
- Headquarters: Tooele, Utah

HeritageWest Credit Union was a credit union with regional headquarters in Tooele, Utah regulated under the authority of the National Credit Union Administration (NCUA).

== History ==
By the late 2000s, there were more HeritageWest members outside of Tooele County for the first time since first arriving from California. After 37 years as TFCU or Tooele Federal Credit Union, the name was changed in April 2008 to HeritageWest Credit Union to better represent the membership and history of the credit union.

On January 1, 2010, HeritageWest became a division of the Chartway Federal Credit Union family. This partnership with the Virginia-based institution opened the doors for increased stability and opportunity for members while still keeping the HeritageWest name and brand. Before the merger, HeritageWest had assets of $311 million and 40,000 members. As part of Chartway, HeritageWest is now part of a credit union family with over $2 billion in assets, more than 200,000 members and is ranked in the top 100 credit unions in the country.

In January 2017, Chartway announced that HeritageWest would be rebranded as Chartway and on March 22, 2017 the website was redirected.
