= Cal Coast News =

- Type: Online Newspaper
- Format: Digital-only
- Staff writers: Karen Velie, Josh Friedman, Ben DiGuglielmo
- Founded: 2008
- Language: English
- Headquarters: P.O. Box 15508, San Luis Obispo, California
- Website: calcoastnews.com

Cal Coast News is an online investigative news site that covers San Luis Obispo County, California. It’s generally abbreviated as CCN. The news group focuses its coverage on issues particularly relevant to the Central Coast of California.

The news group's readership grew substantially in 2010 after a series of stories on hard-money lending led to multiple indictments, including the arrests of developer Kelly Gearhart and lender Karen Guth. In recent years, Cal Coast News reported on county corruption regarding a county supervisor, cannabis business owners and developers.

== History ==
In late Karen Velie, and Daniel Blackburn launched their own online outlet called Uncovered SLO. The name was soon changed to Cal Coast News. Three time Pulitzer Prize winning journalist George Ramos was once an editor who was also serving as the head of the journalism department at California Polytechnic State University. From its inception, CCN emphasized independent investigative journalism and tackled controversies in local government and industry.

Following Ramos's death in 2011, the role of editor was passed on to Cal Poly professor and former journalism department chair Bill Loving. Currently the newspaper is staffed by editors Bill Loving and Karen Velie as well as reporters Josh Friedman and Ben DiGuglielmo

== Libel suit ==
In 2012, an article by Cal Coast News inappropriately cited sources referencing a contractor's employment history and accusing him of mishandling hazardous waste. In 2017 the publication lost the resulting libel case and was asked to pay $1.1 million in damages. After the case ended, Charles Tenborg, the Arroyo Grande waste-management business owner who sued the paper, purchased the paper's Limited Liability Corporation and canceled it. The LLC had been suspended by the Secretary of State after the libel case and Tenborg registered the name himself. While Tenborg controlled the name Cal Coast News he did not gain access to or control over the website where stories were being published, though rumors circulated that he and his co-claimants had taken over the paper. The case was being taken to the SLO County Superior Court in 2017. Subsequent investigations by the Cal Coast News into Tenborg led to claims that Tenborg had given false testimony during the libel suit. Tenborg tried to settle CCN's libel suit appeal out of court, but Blackburn and Velie rejected his demands. In 2019, the appeals court upheld the original libel verdict citing the lack of a full record of the original trial. Also as of 2019, Tenborg and his co-claimant Bill Worrell were under criminal investigation for fraud.

== Adam Hill ==
CCN has published articles accusing former San Luis Obispo County District 3 Supervisor Adam Hill of corruption and bribery. Hill claimed they were false. In a 2012 interview with the New Times, Hill said Velie was a former student of his. He alleged that Velie was someone who said "fabrications". Velie and CCN accused Hill of corruption, bribery with local developers and special interest groups, and personal and financial retaliation. The website accused Hill of backing the Tenborg libel lawsuit as part of "an undisguised effort to destroy the eight-year-old online news agency."

CCN was the first to report that Hill's office and home was searched by the FBI in early 2020. These events would be followed by Hill's suicide attempt. CCN implied the FBI raid and suicide attempt was linked to allegations they published that Hill solicited money from the marijuana and development industries. In August 2020, Hill was found dead at his home from a suspected suicide. CCN erroneously reported the cause of death was a gunshot wound.

== Video footage ==
Also in 2019, Cal Coast News released video footage of a physical assault of a woman at a bar by a San Luis Obispo city employee. The employee pleaded guilty to a misdemeanor to avoid more serious charges, but CCN's release of the video led to local outrage and the eventual firing of the city employee.

== Black Lives Matter ==
In 2020, CCN covered protests throughout San Luis Obispo inspired by the Black Lives Matter movement and initiated after the murder of George Floyd, a black American man, during an arrest in Minneapolis. Its reporting evoked criticism from protesters for the allegations and reporter publishing them. In August 2020, Friedman accused Black Lives Matter protesters of planning to protest in front of the home of SLO County District Attorney Dan Dow. His website cited a flyer announcing the protest that was allegedly sourced from local activist groups. BLM Community Action, a coalition group responsible for organizing most of the protests in San Luis Obispo, denied being involved in the creation of the flyer and denounced the protest at Dow's home.
