= Chartway Federal Credit Union =

US credit union

Chartway Credit Union
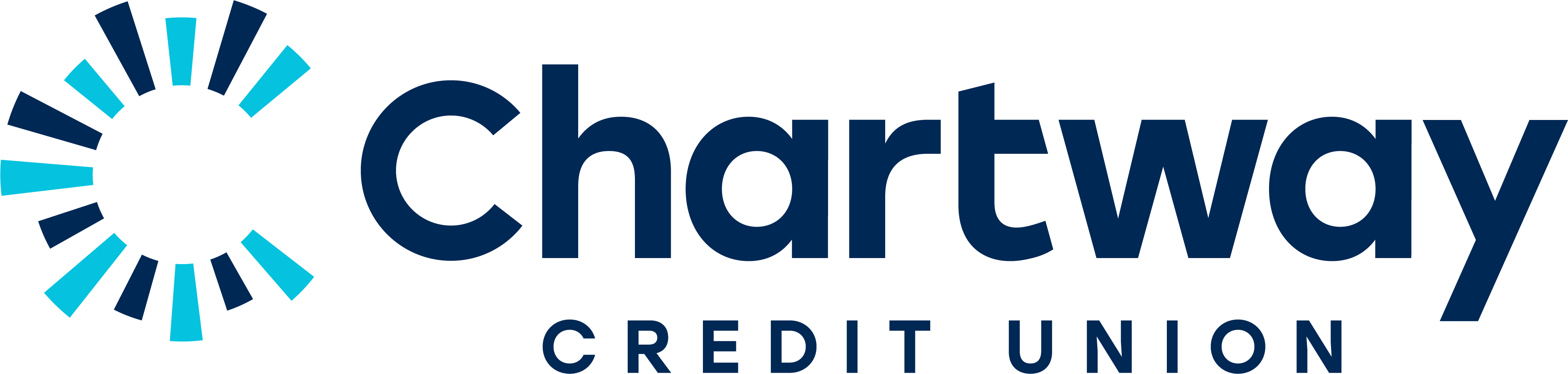

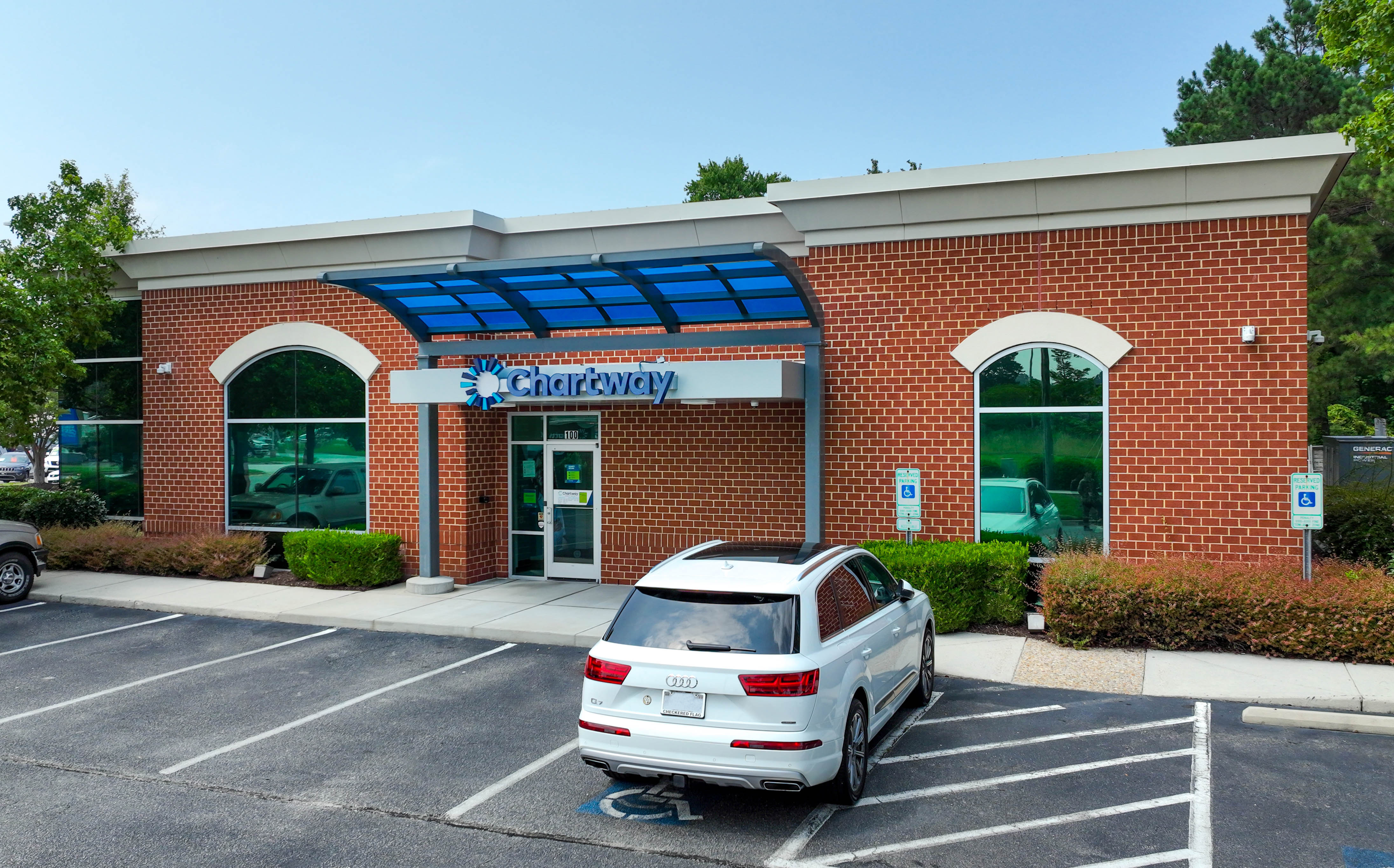
- Chartway Credit Union Branch in Virginia Beach, Virginia, c. June 2023
- Type: Credit union
- Industry: Financial services
- Founded: 1959
- Headquarters: Virginia Beach, Virginia, United States
- Number of locations: 33
- Area served: Virginia, Utah, and Texas
- Key people: Brian Schools, President & CEO; Melinda Barbish (Chair)
- Products: Savings; Checking; Loans; Mortgages; Credit cards; Certificates; Insurance; online banking
- Total assets: $3.1 Billion USD (May 2025)
- Members: 260,000 (July 2025)
- Number of employees: 500+
- Subsidiaries: Chartway Promise Foundation; Chartway Ventures (CUSO)
- Website: chartway.com

Chartway Credit Union is a credit union headquartered in Virginia Beach and is chartered and regulated under the authority of the National Credit Union Administration (NCUA). Chartway serves more than 260,000 members throughout Texas, Utah, and Virginia.

== History ==
On September 4, 1959, seven civilian workers at the Norfolk Naval Air Station each invested $5.00 and incorporated NorVA N.A.S. Federal Credit Union. In October 1959, the organization that would later become Chartway Federal Credit Union was chartered. Its field of membership included civilian and military personnel, along with their family members. The charter also extended to employees of the credit union and their families.

In January 1965, NorVA N.A.S. reached its first milestone of $1 million in assets and over 3,000 members. In 1969, the credit union had an opportunity to further expand with the passage of government legislation that allowed credit unions to change its charters. Under the new legislation, members became eligible for lifetime membership even if they left the qualifying field of membership. Because of this, the credit union was able to retain its members and open its membership to retired Navy department civilians. In April 1972, the credit union changed its name to the Naval Air Norfolk Federal Credit Union. It also merged with Radron Credit Union to expand its field of membership to include the Cape Charles Air Force Station and anyone in the military who used either base.

In March 1983, the credit union changed its name again to Naval Air Federal Credit Union. In 1996, the credit union became Chartway Federal Credit Union. Because there were branches in many different states and a much broader field of membership.

In 2010, HeritageWest Credit Union and SouthWest Community Credit Union joined Chartway and Utah Central Credit Union became part of the organization in 2011.

In 2019, Port Alliance FCU merged with Chartway. In 2020, Saint Matthews FCU merged with Chartway.

== Membership ==
Chartway serves members in branches in Virginia, Utah, and Texas. Prospective members may also join the credit union with a $10 donation to its charitable arm, the Chartway Promise Foundation.

== Employees ==
As of July 2025, the credit union had over 500+ employees in Virginia, Utah, and Texas.

== Awards ==
Chartway Credit Union has received the following awards and honors:

- Juntos Avanzamos Designation by Inclusiv
- 2024 CUNA Diamond Awards by America's Credit Unions
- 2024 American Banker | Best Credit Union to Work For
- 2024 USA Today | Top Workplaces Industry Award for Financial Services
- 2025 CUNA Diamond Awards by America's Credit Unions
- 2025 Forbes Best-In-State Credit Unions
- 2025 USA Today | Top Workplaces
