= Original Pantry Cafe =

Coffee shop and restaurant in Los Angeles, California

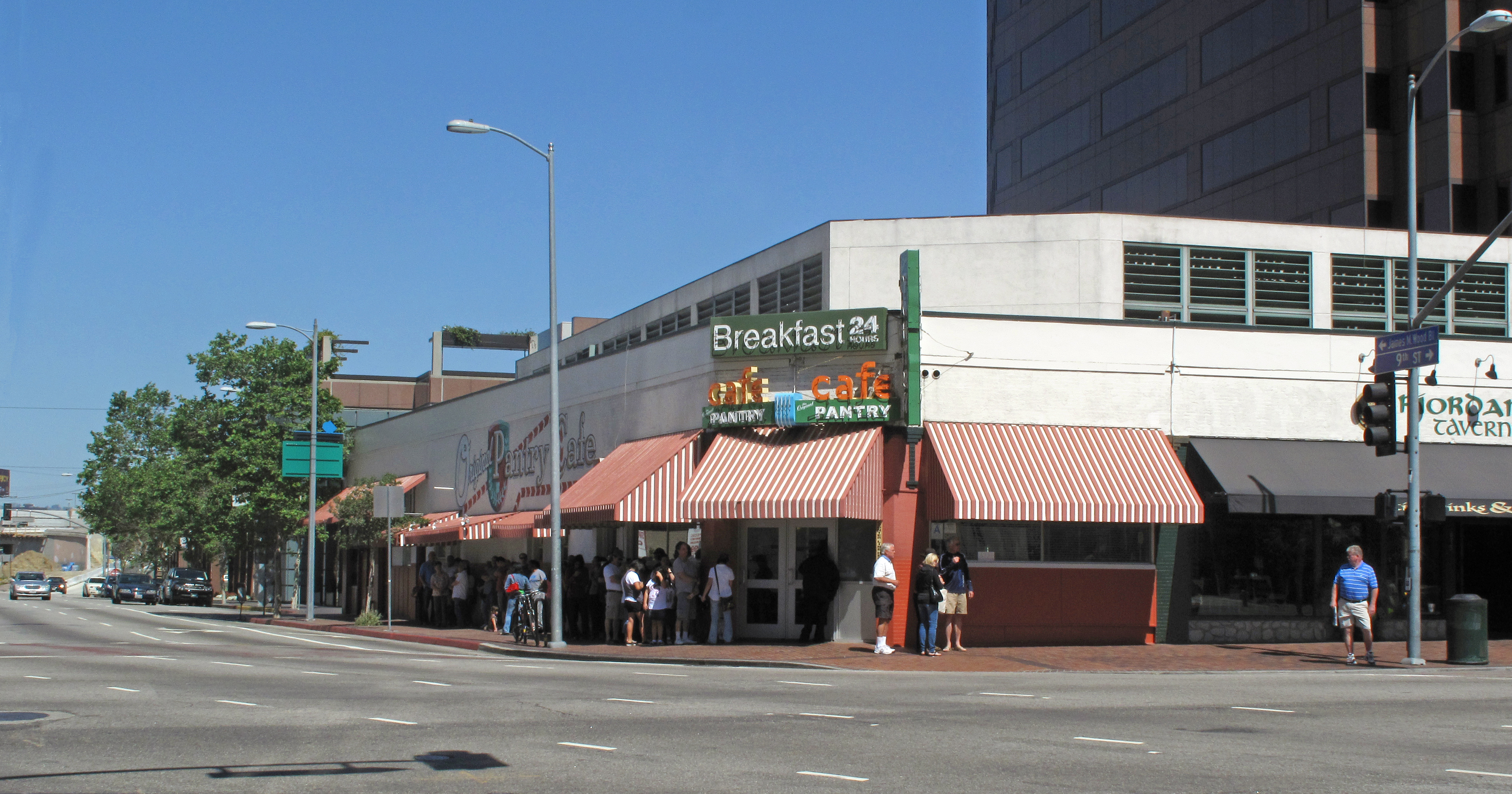
- Pantry Cafe in downtown Los Angeles (2011)
- Interactive map of Original Pantry Cafe

Restaurant information
- Established: May 29, 1924; 102 years ago
- Closed: March 2, 2025; 20 months ago
- Owner: Leo Pustilnikov
- Previous owners: Dewey Logan (1924–1972) (founder); Paul Leuenberger (1974–1981); Richard Riordan (1981–2023); Richard J. Riordan Trust (2023–2025)
- Food type: Diner
- Dress code: none
- Location: 877 South Figueroa, Los Angeles, CA, 90017, US
- Coordinates: 34°2′47.1″N 118°15′46.6″W
- Seating capacity: 150
- Reservations: none
- Other locations: none
- Website: www.originalpantryla.com

Los Angeles Historic-Cultural Monument
- Reference no.: 255

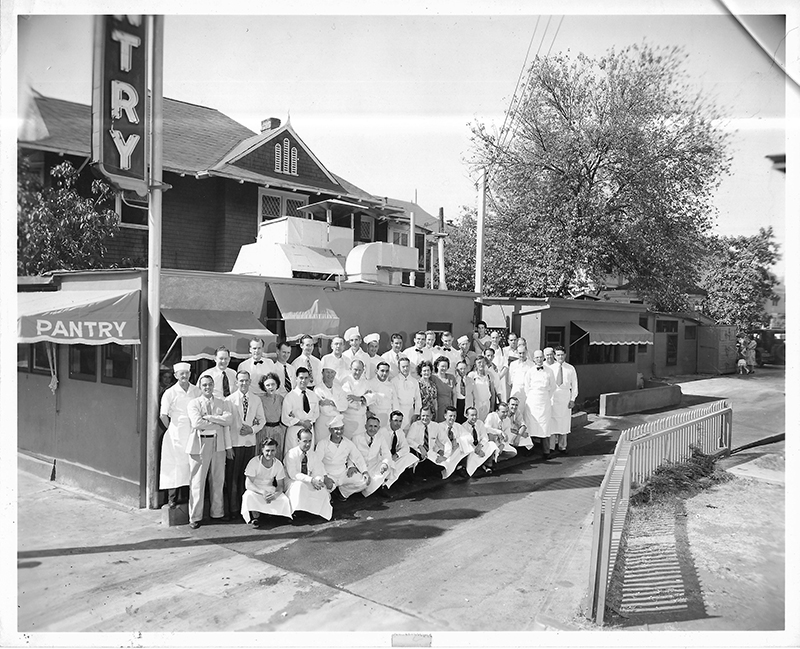
Prior to moving to its current location at 9th and Figueroa streets, the Pantry was at 9th and Francisco streets. Al Fountain is in the back row, second in from the left. Pantry founder and owner Dewey W. Logan is in the front row, fourth in from the left.

The Original Pantry Cafe is a coffee shop and restaurant in Los Angeles, California located at the corner of 9th and Figueroa in the South Park district. The Pantry (as it is known by locals) claimed to never have closed or been without a customer since it opened in 1924, including when it changed locations in 1950 to make room for a freeway off-ramp; it served lunch in the original location and served dinner at the new location the same day. This claim is also attributed to the fact that the first owner, Dewey Logan, never refused a customer even if the customer was short on money. It was, however, closed briefly at the order of health inspectors on November 26, 1997, and reopened the next day. That tradition ended due to the COVID-19 pandemic in California, and the restaurant had since been open from 7 am to 3 pm on weekdays and until 5 p.m. on weekends. The restaurant was owned by former Los Angeles mayor Richard Riordan and served many celebrities and politicians.

After 101 years in operation, the restaurant closed on March 2, 2025, as a result of a labor dispute while the business property was being sold or liquidated. It was set to reopen on December 31, 2025, after an agreement between the restaurant's new owner and the labor union representing its workers.

After missing their original re-opening date for unstated reasons, the new owner announced a new opening date target of April 2026.

After missing the second opening date of April 1, 2026 for unstated reasons, the new owner announced a new opening "in May" and further stated that customers would find "new floors and new menu items" which would try to reflect a "multicultural city with such a diverse food scene." The restaurant did not reopen.

On October 22, 2026, SFGate reported that a new opening date was set for November 19, 2026.

== History ==
When it was opened in 1924 at its original location at 9th Street and Francisco Street, the restaurant consisted of one room, a 15-stool counter, a small grill, a hot plate and sink. In 1950, The Pantry moved to its location at 9th and Figueroa, and had since been designated as a Los Angeles Historic-Cultural Monument No. 255, and named the most famous restaurant in Los Angeles.

The restaurant was known for serving coleslaw to all patrons during the evening hours, even if they ultimately decide to order breakfast. It claimed to serve 90 tons of bread (or 461 loaves per day) and 10.5 tons (20,000-tree harvest) of coffee per year.

After 87 years, the restaurant's tradition of serving free coffee ended in 2011.

Part of the building on Figueroa Street became Riordan's Tavern, also owned by the former mayor.

For the celebration of the 90th anniversary of the restaurant in 2014, some people submitted their stories about The Original Pantry Cafe. This was the entry ("A Pancake Tradition") by the winner, Devin Kelley. A sign can be found in the entrance of the coffee shop:

It's Sunday, 10:30. Brunch-time. We're standing in line outside the Original Pantry. The summer breeze ripples my t-shirt. I grin at my grandma. She's standing, not noticing me, arms crossed, looking ahead at the front door. I count the heads in front of us again. Now we're in ninth place. The couple behind us shuffles their shoes, catching up with us, as the line shifts forward another few feet. The line is long but welcoming. Everyone wavers in it, shifting, looking behind, forward again, and heads bobbing and peering over others towards the front. My grandma looks at me, a paper menu clutched between soft fists, and forces a smile. She's been going here since she was nine years old. Always, every Sunday, her mother and father would bring her to the pantry after mass, allowing her to order whatever she desired. Scanning the long menu, between the classic Sour Dough French Toast, and the mouth-watering Bacon and Cheese Omelet, she would wrinkle her brow and pretend to consider ordering something different. But she never did. It was always the pancakes and a large orange juice. Her parents would laugh at her seriousness. "Let me guess," her mother would say. "The Pancakes?" My grandma taught me this not-so-secret combination when I was nine. I too ordered the pancakes every time. I too dreamed of the pillowy cakes drenched in maple syrup and butter. I too washed it down with a tall glass of OJ. And I too pretended, though I never meant it, to consider the long list of options on the menu. We had a simple tradition at the Pantry. The line moves again. I count the heads. We're three feet away from the entrance and I can already smell the buttery bread and bacon. My grandma puts her arm around my shoulder and winks at me, as she drops her menu on the ground. I bend to pick it up, but as I do, I notice two tall, large men, sneak in front of us. "Excuse me" my grandma says, "the line starts back there." She points down St. James Blvd., down a long line of excited people fidgeting. Somewhere in line a man is playing soft rock on his phone. It's "Take it Easy" by the Eagles. The two big men, one with sunglasses and a muscle shirt, and the other with torn jeans, ignore her call to arms. To my amazement, she pokes one of them on the back. "What do you want old lady?" the man exclaims as he turns around. "Excuse me, my grandson and I have been waiting in line for pancakes. That's all." The man in torn jeans looks at me and then at the old lady who had just challenged him. His eyes droop and he grabs his friend by the bicep. "My grandma use to take me here when I was young" he says. "Come on" he says to his friend. "The line starts back there." My grandma takes me by the hand, nods her head, and smiles wide.

After 100 years, the restaurant closed on March 2, 2025. Some of the Pantry's employees relocated to East Los Tacos in East Los Angeles, with that restaurant's owner turning The Pantry's offerings into her restaurant's breakfast menu. On September 11, 2025, the owner and property developer Leo Pustilnikov and the labor union representing the Pantry's workers announced that it would reopen on December 31, 2025, with many of its original staff, its original schedule and its original menu returning with minor changes. After failing to open on December 31, a new date of April 1, 2026 was announced. The opening date was subsequently changed to "in May" along with the announcement that the menu would be changing to reflect a "multicultural" city.

== Lore ==
The wait staff, and even the cook, were known for wearing impeccably starched white dress shirts with black bow ties.

It was said that the Pantry hired its staff from among men recently released from jail or prison, providing them with an occupation as a way of rehabilitating them into society but this legend was concocted by staff to fool a visiting reporter.

For many years, a gentleman who could have passed as the twin brother of actor Humphrey Bogart worked at The Pantry as a waiter, and was known as "Bogie" by regulars.

== In popular culture ==
The cafe is regularly mentioned or visited by characters in Michael Connelly's series of mystery novels featuring LAPD detective Harry Bosch, including The Black Echo and The Last Coyote.

The restaurant is featured in a scene in Judd Apatow's 2007 comedy Knocked Up, in which Seth Rogen's character informs his father (Harold Ramis) of his girlfriend's pregnancy.
