= Jacob Soboroff =

American journalist (born 1983)

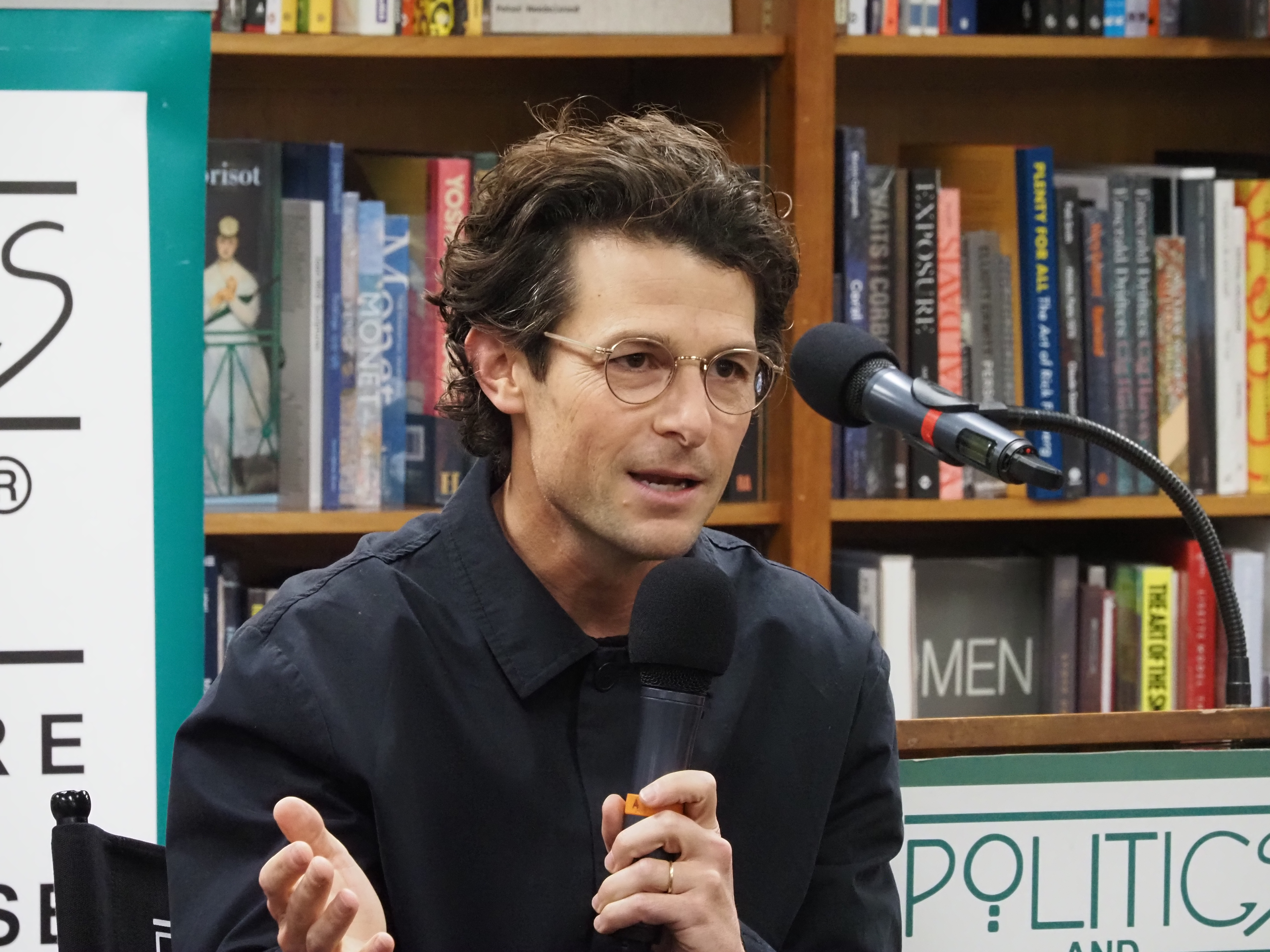
- Soboroff in 2026
- Born: Jacob Hirsch Soboroff; 1983 (age 42–43); Los Angeles, California, U.S.
- Education: New York University (BA, MA)
- Occupation: Journalist
- Employers: NBCUniversal; Comcast
- Television: MS NOW correspondent; NBC News correspondent; TakePart Live co-host; HuffPost Live host and producer
- Spouse: Nicole Cari (m. 2012)
- Children: 2
- Father: Steve Soboroff
- Family: Joseph Cari Jr. (father-in-law)
- Website: www.jacobsoboroff.com

Jacob Hirsch Soboroff (born 1983) is an American journalist. He is known as a correspondent for NBC News and MS NOW. Prior to his debut on the network in September 2015, he was the host of YouTube Nation and a co-host of TakePart Live on Pivot TV. He was also a founding host and producer of HuffPost Live, the live streaming network of HuffPost, and while he was at NBC, he served as a weekday and weekend fill-in and substitute anchor for Today and NBC Nightly News. In late 2025, he became a correspondent for MS NOW. In June 2026 he debuted his new show on MS NOW titled Connect with Jacob Soboroff.

== Early life ==
Born in Los Angeles, Soboroff is the eldest child of Patti and Steve Soboroff, a real estate developer and philanthropist and former member of the Los Angeles Board of Police Commissioners. He is Jewish. Soboroff attended Harvard-Westlake School, and later received a Bachelor of Arts in politics in 2005 and a Master of Arts in political theory and philosophy in 2006, both from New York University.

== Career ==
In college, Soboroff was an aide to New York City Mayor Michael Bloomberg.

Soboroff was a contributor to MTV's 2012 presidential election coverage, for which he discussed America's young voters with presidential candidate Mitt Romney. As the founding correspondent for AMC News, Soboroff interviewed actors and filmmakers. Soboroff co-hosted NBC's proactive school makeover show School Pride. He has contributed reporting to CNN, NPR's Weekend Edition, and the PBS series Wired Science. Between January and December 2014, Soboroff hosted YouTube Nation, a pop-culture oriented news show on YouTube.

As a correspondent for MSNBC (today known as MS NOW), Soboroff specializes in border issues, making him one of the first reporters to call public attention to the Trump administration family separation policy, whereby children were separated from parents who crossed the U.S.–Mexico border without proper documentation. He was one of ten journalists invited by authorities to tour Casa Padre, a facility in Texas housing 1500 boys ages 10 to 17. He described it as "shocking... an old Walmart which has essentially been turned into a child prison." His book on the subject, titled Separated: Inside an American Tragedy, was published on July 7, 2020.

In late 2024, Soboroff was named one of America's 10 best TV news journalists by GALECA: The Society of LGBTQ Entertainment Critics. The organization, purveyors of the Dorian Awards to mainstream and LGBTQ-themed content, praised Soboroff for "his determined exposés on the U.S.-Mexico border crisis and the ongoing plight of immigrants."

In January 2025, Soboroff reported on the wildfire destruction of his childhood neighborhood in Pacific Palisades. He also posted on Instagram.

In August 2025, with the split of MSNBC into Versant, Soboroff joined MS NOW full-time as Senior National and Political Correspondent. In March 2026, it was announced that Soboroff would host a new weekend morning show in June 2026. That show, Connect with Jacob Soboroff, premiered on June 13, 2026, replacing Velshi after Ali Velshi became host of The 11th Hour. The show will be MS NOW's first show based in Los Angeles.

== Personal life ==
Soboroff resides in Los Angeles. He married fashion executive Nicole Elizabeth Cari in 2012. Cari and Soboroff have two children. Soboroff is an executive director of the nonpartisan organization Why Tuesday? It seeks to make "America's democracy stronger through increased voter participation".

== Books ==
- Soboroff, Jacob (July 7, 2020). Separated: Inside an American Tragedy (First hardcover ed.). New York: Custom House. ISBN 978-0062992192. OCLC 1193996842.
- —— (January 6, 2026). Firestorm: The Great Los Angeles Fires and America's New Age of Disaster (First hardcover ed.). New York: Mariner Books. ISBN 978-0063467965. OCLC 1518921638.
