= Andy Roeser =

Basketball executive

Richard Andrew Roeser (born 1959 in Michigan) is the former president of the Los Angeles Clippers of the National Basketball Association. He also served as the alternate governor of the Clippers, representing the team in league matters among the NBA's Board of Governors.

Roeser was the third-longest tenured member of the Clipper franchise, beside play-by-play broadcaster Ralph Lawler, having joined the team in 1984 after its move from San Diego. He first served as executive vice president, and was promoted to team president in 2007.

In 2014, a widespread controversy erupted after an audio recording was released containing racially insensitive comments by the team's owner, Donald Sterling.

When Sterling was banned from the league in April 2014, Roeser was initially named as the person who would run the team.

He left the Clippers after Sterling sold the team to Steve Ballmer in the summer of 2014.

Prior to joining the Clippers, Roeser worked at the accounting firm Ernst & Young. He also served as the president of the Los Angeles Clippers Foundation, the team's charitable arm. He is also a board member of the Los Angeles Sports Council and Cal State Long Beach's Advisory Board for the Graduate Program in Sports Management. As Clippers' president, Roeser was largely in charge of the team's business operations, also including negotiating player contracts.

Roeser is possibly known best for his appearance at the 2009 NBA Draft Lottery, where the team won the right to pick number one overall (the pick became University of Oklahoma forward Blake Griffin), and Roeser donned a pattern designed as the Clippers' home white jersey inside his sport-jacket with the number 1 emblazoned.

== Personal life ==
Roeser, his wife Anne and their two children reside in Long Beach, California. Raised in Birmingham, Michigan, he is a graduate of Michigan State University.
