= Antonio Villaraigosa =

American attorney and politician (born 1953)

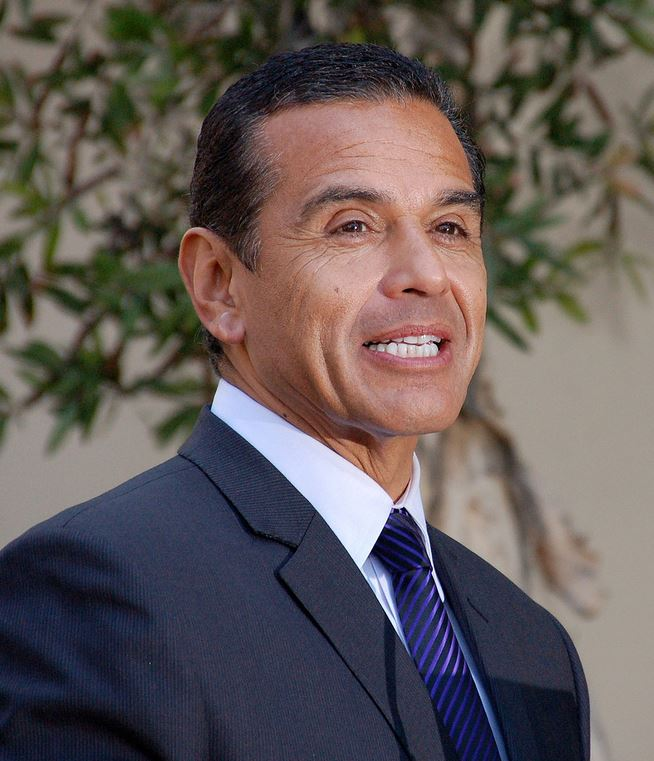
- Villaraigosa in 2013

41st Mayor of Los Angeles
- In office July 1, 2005 – July 1, 2013
- Preceded by: James Hahn
- Succeeded by: Eric Garcetti

69th President of the United States Conference of Mayors
- In office 2011–2012
- Preceded by: Elizabeth Kautz
- Succeeded by: Michael Nutter

Member of the Los Angeles City Council from the 14th district
- In office July 1, 2003 – July 1, 2005
- Preceded by: Nick Pacheco
- Succeeded by: José Huizar

63rd Speaker of the California State Assembly
- In office February 26, 1998 – April 13, 2000
- Preceded by: Cruz Bustamante
- Succeeded by: Robert Hertzberg

Majority Leader of the California Assembly
- In office December 2, 1996 – February 26, 1998
- Preceded by: Jim Rogan
- Succeeded by: Kevin Shelley

Member of the California State Assembly from the 45th district
- In office December 5, 1994 – November 30, 2000
- Preceded by: Richard Polanco
- Succeeded by: Jackie Goldberg

Personal details
- Born: Antonio Ramón Villar Jr. January 23, 1953 (age 73) East Los Angeles, California, U.S.
- Party: Democratic
- Spouses: Corina Raigosa (m. 1987; div. 2007); Patricia Govea (m. 2016; sep. 2018)
- Children: 4
- Education: East Los Angeles College (attended); University of California, Los Angeles (BA); People's College of Law (JD)

Antonio Ramón Villaraigosa (/ˌviːəraɪˈɡoʊsə/; né Villar Jr.; born January 23, 1953) is an American politician who served as the 41st Mayor of Los Angeles from 2005 to 2013. A member of the Democratic Party, he previously served as the Majority Leader from 1996 to 1998 and Speaker of the California State Assembly from 1998 to 2000.

Villaraigosa is a graduate of University of California, Los Angeles and the unaccredited People's College of Law.

Villaraigosa was a candidate in both the 2018 and 2026 California gubernatorial election.

== Early life and education ==
Antonio Ramón Villar Jr. was born on January 23, 1953, in the unincorporated community of East Los Angeles, California. He grew up in the City Terrace neighborhood and attended both Catholic and public schools.

At age 16, a benign tumor in Antonio's spinal column briefly paralyzed him from the waist down. His grades plummeted at Cathedral High School, and the next year, he was expelled after getting into a fight after a football game. He later graduated from Theodore Roosevelt High School after taking adult education classes there.

Villar went on to attend East Los Angeles College and eventually transferred to University of California, Los Angeles (UCLA), graduating with a Bachelor of Arts degree in history in 1977. At UCLA, he was a leader of MEChA, an organization that seeks to promote Chicano unity and empowerment through political action, but later renounced his association with the group citing its controversial stances on race.

After UCLA, Villar attended the unaccredited Peoples College of Law. After completing law school and subsequently failing the California bar exam four times, he became a field representative and organizer with the United Teachers Los Angeles.

He adopted the blended surname Villaraigosa upon his marriage with Corina Raigosa in 1987.

== Early political career ==
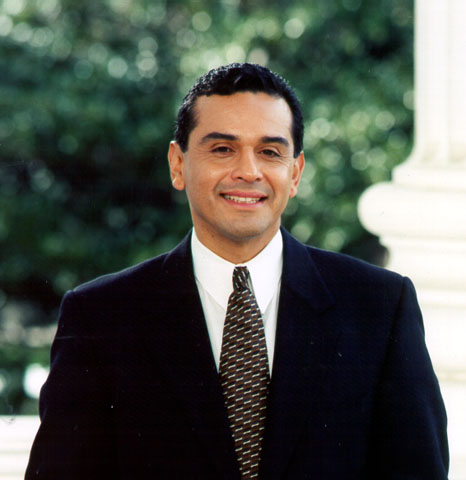
Villaraigosa during his tenure as Speaker

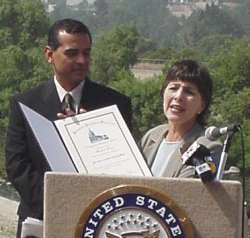
Villaraigosa with Senator Barbara Boxer in June 2000

In 1990, Villaraigosa was appointed to the Los Angeles County Metropolitan Transportation Authority board of directors, where he served until 1994. In 1994, he was elected to the California State Assembly. He was selected to serve as Democratic Assembly Whip and Assembly Majority Leader. In 1998, Villaraigosa was chosen by his colleagues to be the Speaker of the Assembly. He left the Assembly in 2000 after serving three two-year terms.

=== 2001 Los Angeles mayoral campaign ===
Villaraigosa ran for election as Mayor of Los Angeles in the 2001 citywide contest, but was defeated by Democrat James Hahn in a run-off election. In 2003, Villaraigosa defeated incumbent Councilman Nick Pacheco to win a seat on the Los Angeles City Council representing the 14th District.

== Mayor of Los Angeles ==
=== Elections ===
==== 2005 ====
Villaraigosa placed first in the primary for the Los Angeles mayoral election of March 8, 2005, and won the run-off election on May 17, receiving 58.7% of the vote. On July 1, 2005, Villaraigosa was sworn in as the 41st Mayor of Los Angeles.

==== 2009 ====
Villaraigosa was re-elected in 2009, receiving 55.65% of the vote against his most prominent challenger, attorney Walter Moore who won 26.23% of the vote. Villaraigosa drew controversy by refusing to debate any of his opponents, before the election.

=== Tenure ===
==== Transportation ====
One of Villaraigosa's main transportation-related goals was to extend the Purple Line subway down Wilshire Boulevard to Santa Monica. Proponents dubbed the project the "Subway to the Sea."

On November 4, 2008, Los Angeles County voters passed Measure R, an additional half-cent per dollar sales tax that increased the sales tax rate in Los Angeles County from 8.25% to 8.75% and is projected to generate up to $40 billion over 30 years for transportation. Measure R included funding for the portion of the "Subway to the Sea" between Wilshire/Western and Westwood/VA Hospital; a project known as the D Line Extension. Its passage was credited in large part to Villaraigosa, who lobbied the Metropolitan Transportation Agency and County Board of Supervisors to place it on the November ballot, and helped organize the fundraising efforts.

In February 2010, Villaraigosa traveled to Washington, D.C. in order to promote a "Ten/Thirty" plan that requests an $8.8 billion bridge loan to augment the $5.8 billion expected from Measure R tax revenues. The loan would be repaid with continuing income from Measure R funds. Villaraigosa's 30/10 plan eventually morphed into the America Fast Forward program and was passed by Congress.

On Sunday, July 18, 2010, Villaraigosa fell from his bicycle after being cut off by a taxi driver; Villaraigosa broke his elbow in the fall, and the taxi driver fled the scene. The accident converted Villaraigosa into "a new champion of cyclists' rights", when he declared a bicycle safety summit, and announced that he would push for the passage of a "3 foot passing rule" in California. The summit meeting, held in August, was criticized for not including input from Los Angeles' Bicycle Advisory Committee. Villaraigosa later issued an executive directive that mandated the construction of 40 miles of bikeways each year and requires city agencies to include bicycle-friendly features in their programs and expand public education and training campaigns.

==== Public safety ====
Villaraigosa vowed to hire 1,000 new police officers. On March 6, 2009, Mayor Villaraigosa and Police Chief Bratton announced that the Los Angeles Police Department (LAPD) had expanded to its largest force in city history. On May 14, 2009, the Los Angeles City Council approved a LAPD/LAFD (Los Angeles Fire Department) hiring freeze.

==== Education ====
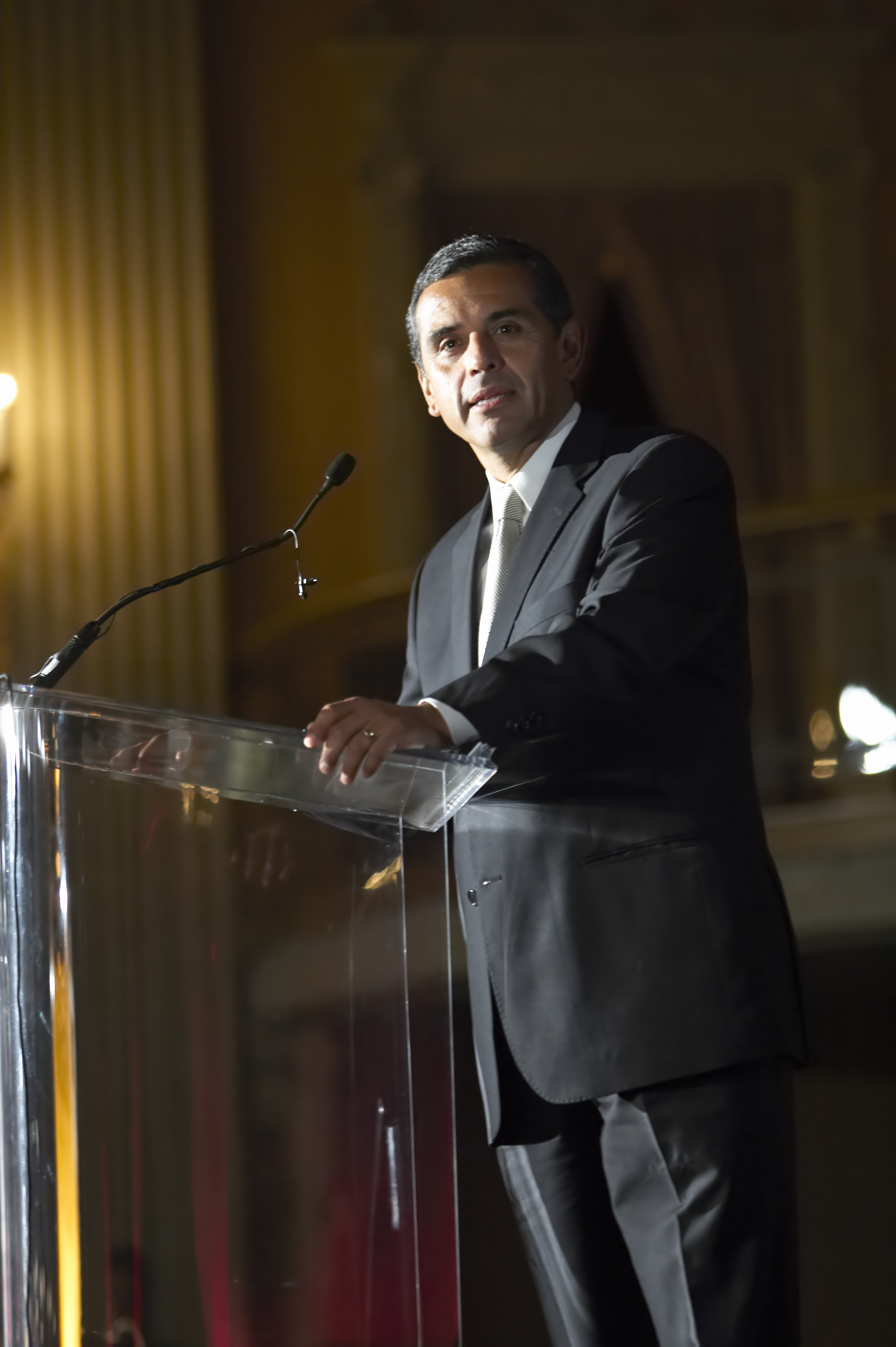
Antonio Villaraigosa

In his first State of the City address, he announced his intention to assume full control of the Los Angeles Unified School District (LAUSD), through a bill passed by the state legislature. The school board and teachers' union immediately protested.

Because he campaigned on the issue of education, Villaraigosa sought the legal authority to do so through AB 1381 which shifted power from the Board of Education to the mayor. AB 1381 was passed by the state legislature and signed by Governor Arnold Schwarzenegger. In December 2006, AB 1381 was ruled unconstitutional.

In response, Villaraigosa founded a non-profit entity called the Mayor's Partnership for Los Angeles Schools to take control of the district's lowest-performing schools and transform them into high-performing schools. The Partnership eventually managed 21 LAUSD campuses, which operate under the same labor contract as LAUSD. In June 2009, teachers at eight of the ten campuses cast a vote of "no confidence" in the Partnership.

==== Taxes ====
Villaraigosa tripled the city's trash collection fee from $11 per month to $36.32 per month for single-family homes, stating: "Every new dollar residents pay for trash pickup will be used to put more officers on the streets," in a press release dated April 12, 2006. A 2008 L.A. City Controller audit by Laura Chick determined that "only $47 million, or about one-third of the new trash-fee revenue then pouring into city coffers, went to hiring police, and only 366 officers were hired instead of the promised 1,000."

Villaraigosa then lobbied to place Proposition S on the ballot to fund new police officers. This generated some controversy among tax activists, as Villaraigosa and his negotiating team had recently reached a salary agreement resulting in a 23% pay hike. Controller Laura Chick noted that Proposition S language does not restrict expenditure to police and firefighters, and instead deposits the money into the general fund.

Villaraigosa also supported Proposition O and two education bond measures, which increased property tax assessments.

On March 23, 2010, Villaraigosa, in a leaked memo warned the Los Angeles City Council that their potential failure to support a series of four proposed rate increases totaling 37% and already approved by the city's Department of Water and Power would be "the most immediate and direct route to bankruptcy the city could pursue".

== International publicity ==
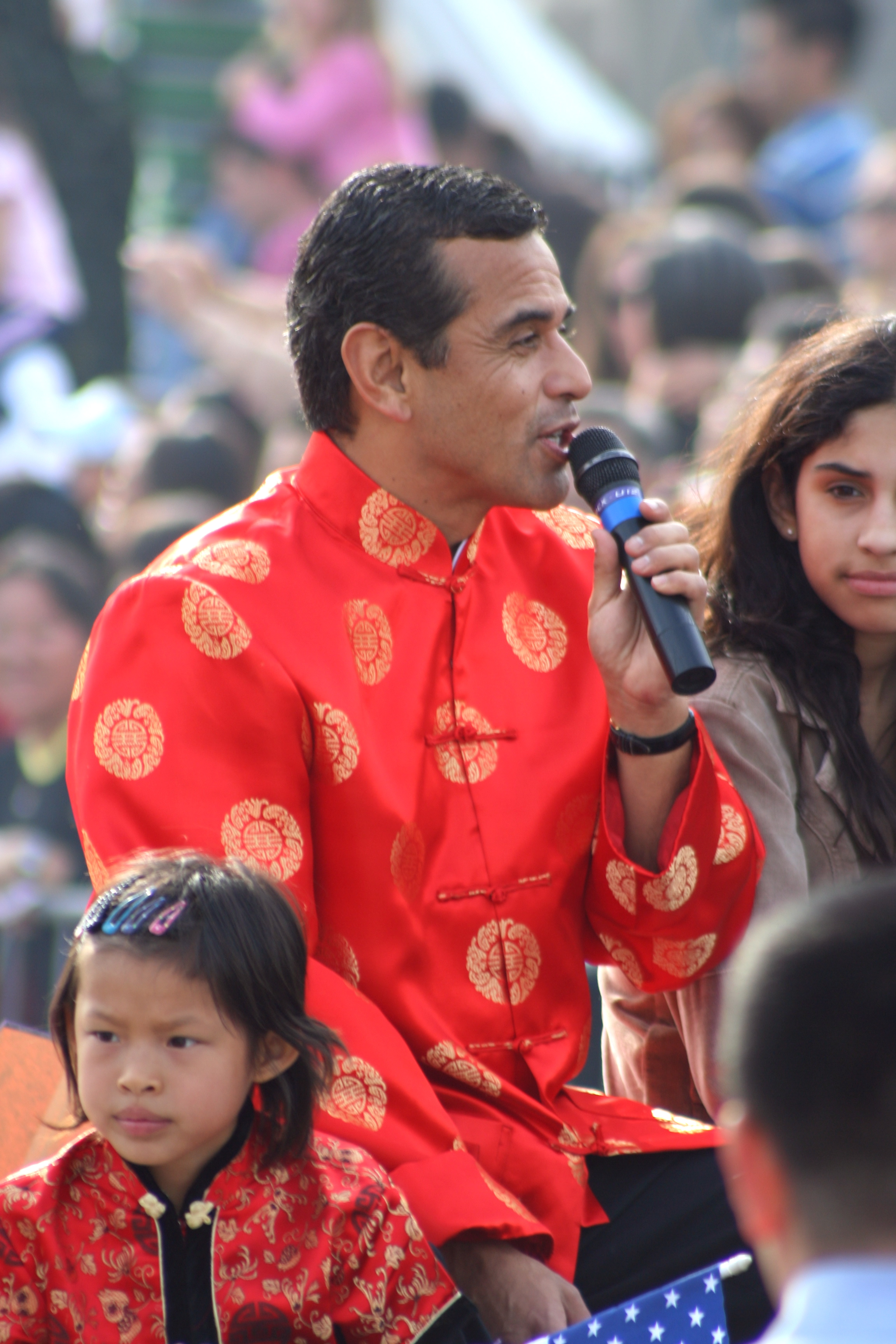
Antonio Villaraigosa at the Chinatown parade

In October 2006, Villaraigosa traveled to England and Asia for a sixteen-day trade mission. In England, he visited London and Manchester, at the invitation of then-Prime Minister Tony Blair, and spoke about Los Angeles' efforts regarding global warming, homeland security and emergency preparedness, and its bid for the 2016 Olympic Games. Prime Minister Blair had visited Mayor Villaraigosa a couple months prior to that in Los Angeles.

Villaraigosa traveled to Israel in June 2008 to meet with experts in homeland security, counter-terrorism, and green technology. He also signed an agreement with the International Institute for Counter-Terrorism (ICT – part the Interdisciplinary Center in Herzliya) on behalf of the LA police department. Under the agreement, the ICT will train US homeland security officials.

== Criticisms and controversies ==
In June 2009, Villaraigosa made the cover of Los Angeles Magazine, titled "Failure," with an accompanying article, which claimed that Villaraigosa often confused campaigning with governance, wasted 22 weeks in his first term trying to take over the school board, and did little to help education in the City of Los Angeles.

=== Ethics violations ===
On May 2, 2007, the Los Angeles Times reported that Villaraigosa was under investigation for ethics violations: "The executive director of the Los Angeles Ethics Commission...accused Mayor Antonio Villaraigosa of 31 violations of campaign finance and disclosure laws stemming from his 2003 campaign for the City Council."

In June 2010, a formal ethics investigation of Villaraigosa was launched due to his unreported acceptance of 81 tickets to concerts, awards ceremonies and sporting events. Estimates—including the 13 Lakers courtside tickets valued at $3,100 each and Academy Awards and Governor's Ball tickets at $21,000 each—suggest that the value of the tickets could amount to tens of thousands of dollars.

=== 2012 DNC controversy ===
On the second day of the 2012 Democratic National Convention, September 5, former Ohio Governor Ted Strickland introduced an amendment on the floor of the convention to re-insert language invoking God and recognizing Jerusalem as Israel's capital. Convention Chairman Villaraigosa put the amendment to a voice vote requiring a two-thirds majority for passage. After the first vote had greater volume of "nays", Villaraigosa called for a second vote, which was again met with greater volume of "nays" than "yays". A woman standing to his left said, "You've got to rule, and then you've got to let them do what they're gonna do." Villaraigosa called a third vote, with the same result. Despite not receiving a two-thirds majority, Villaraigosa still declared the amendment passed, causing an eruption of boos on the floor. Despite the obvious video and audio evidence, Villaraigosa would later claim about the incident that, "It was a lot of ado about nothing" and, "Not one person objected" when confronted by reporters.

=== Herbalife advisor ===
In February 2015, while Villaraigosa was considering a run for the United States Senate, the Los Angeles Times reported on Villaraigosa's work as an advisor to Herbalife Nutrition, a controversial multi-level marketing company that sells vitamins and supplements. The story questioned whether Villaraigosa's relationship with Herbalife would become a significant hurdle in a statewide run, given the company's checkered reputation and ongoing U.S. Federal Trade Commission investigations. Herbalife has been strongly criticized as being a pyramid scheme that specifically targets Hispanics.

Villaraigosa's role as a consultant was condemned by the advocacy group League of United Latin American Citizens, which argued Herbalife had a history of making misleading claims to Latin-Americans who sold their products.

== Public opinion ==
After his election as Los Angeles Mayor, Villaraigosa was featured on the cover of Newsweek, and in Time's story on the country's 25 most influential Latinos, but repeated questions concerning his marital infidelity issues appear to have damaged his reputation locally and nationally. His approval rating when he left office was 47%.

While mayor, Villaraigosa also received criticism because of his membership in MEChA while attending UCLA and his alleged support for immigration reform. He has also been criticized because of the high frequency in which he holds press conferences, attends photo-ops, and travels out of town (including campaigning for Hillary Clinton). An LA Weekly article by Patrick Range McDonald published on September 11, 2008, presented an analysis of a 10-week period from May 21 to August 1, and determined that "On direct city business—such as signing legislation and meeting with city-department heads—his schedule shows the mayor spent 11 percent of his time...Yet the 11 percent of Villaraigosa's time that the Weekly has identified as being spent in L.A. on actual city work—running, fixing or shaping government policies and actions—reveals that he frequently spends that limited time huddling with special-interest groups who have helped him attain higher office."

Villaraigosa was featured in the editorial cover story of the June 2009 Los Angeles Magazine, which took him to task for a lack of effectiveness regarding many of his stated policy priorities, and a focus on election to higher office, to the detriment of the needs of the city. In response, the Jewish Journal of Greater Los Angeles devoted its June 11 cover story to a defense of Villaraigosa's record.

== Post-mayoral career ==
After he left the mayor's office, Villaraigosa was involved in Campaign to Fix the Debt, a movement for entitlement reform to cut Social Security and Medicare, which Democratic strategist Nathan Ballard said is "not just touching the third rail — it's an act of public self-immolation."

=== 2018 Gubernatorial Campaign ===
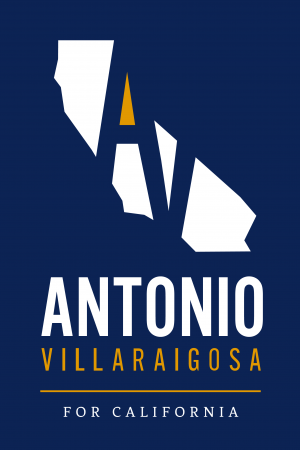

On November 10, 2016, Villaraigosa announced his candidacy in the 2018 California gubernatorial election.

From the latter half of 2017, Democratic Lieutenant Governor Gavin Newsom was widely seen as the favored front runner for the top two primary. Villaraigosa and Republican businessman John H. Cox had both been running closely behind Newsom to obtain the second place spot. However, in late 2017, as more prominent candidates entered the race, Villaraigosa saw his polling numbers slip out of competition with Cox. This mainly left the race between Newsom and Cox, with a third place free-for-all between Republican State Assemblyman Travis Allen and Villaraigosa.

Villaraigosa placed third in the primary with 13.3% to Newsom's 33.7% and Cox's 25.4%.

=== 2026 Gubernatorial Campaign ===
On July 23, 2024, he announced a second try for California's governorship, however ultimately placed 7th in the primary with 1.1% of the vote.

== Personal life ==
Villaraigosa's first of four children was born when he was 21. His second child was born four years later.

He married Corina Raigosa on November 28, 1987, and adopted a combination of their last names as his family name. The couple had two children. In the wake of his affair with Spanish-language television reporter Mirthala Salinas, Villaraigosa announced that he was separating from his wife, and on June 12, 2007, Corina Villaraigosa filed for dissolution of marriage in the Los Angeles Superior Court due to adultery. Villaraigosa acknowledged on July 3, 2007, that he was in a relationship with Salinas. As a result of the affair, Salinas was suspended by her employer, Telemundo, and against her will was relocated to Riverside, after which she resigned. In a New Yorker profile published shortly before the divorce, Villaraigosa acknowledged that he and Corina had had difficulties over the course of their marriage. "In a twenty-year marriage, there are many ups and downs", Villaraigosa said. The same article in The New Yorker also reported that, in 1994, while his wife had been battling thyroid cancer, Villaraigosa left town for several days with the wife of a close friend following his election to the California State Assembly. As a result, his wife filed for a divorce, and they were estranged for two and a half years.

Villaraigosa had a relationship with Lu Parker, a local television news anchor and 1994 Miss USA, in March 2009. In July 2012, Parker's publicist told the Los Angeles Times that the couple's relationship had ended on May 25, 2012.

Villaraigosa married Patricia Govea on August 6, 2016, in San Miguel de Allende, Mexico.

Villaraigosa and Govea separated in 2018 and filed for divorce in 2022.

== See also ==
- Los Angeles mayoral election, 2001
- Los Angeles mayoral election, 2005
- Los Angeles mayoral election, 2009

California Assembly
Preceded by Richard Katz	Majority Leader of the California Assembly; 1996–1998	Succeeded by Kevin Shelley
Political offices
Preceded by Cruz Bustamante	Speaker of the California Assembly; 1998–2000	Succeeded by Robert Hertzberg
Preceded by James Hahn	Mayor of Los Angeles; 2005–2013	Succeeded by Eric Garcetti
Party political offices
Preceded by Nancy Pelosi	Permanent Chair of the Democratic National Convention; 2012	Succeeded by Marcia Fudge
