= President of the Los Angeles City Council =

- Seal of the City of Los Angeles

- Flag of Los Angeles

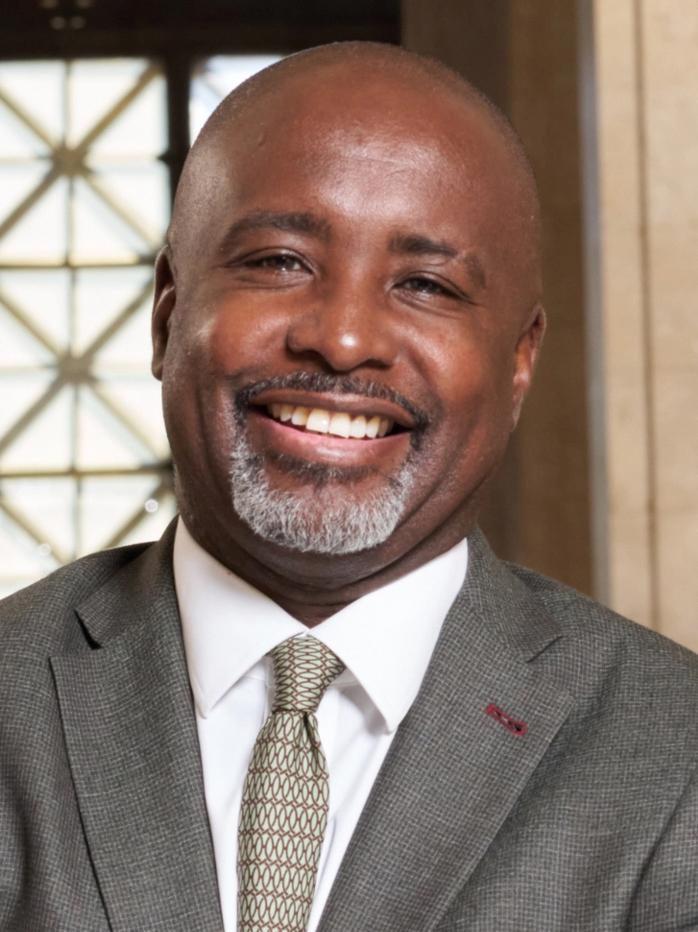
- Incumbent; Marqueece Harris-Dawson since September 20, 2024
- Style: Council President
- Member of: Los Angeles City Council
- Appointer: Elected by members of the City Council
- Inaugural holder: Boyle Workman
- Formation: 1919
- Deputy: Bob Blumenfield (President pro tempore)
- Website: City Council

The President of the Los Angeles City Council is the presiding officer of the Los Angeles City Council. The president presides as chair over meetings of the council and assignments to City Council committees and handles parliamentary duties like ruling motions in or out of order. The president automatically becomes an acting mayor when the mayor is out of state. Since 2020, the president has been elected at the first scheduled council meeting in January of even-numbered years.

The current president is Democrat Marqueece Harris-Dawson, who took office on September 20, 2024.

== History ==
=== Early history ===
The office of the President was created with the introduction of the Los Angeles Common Council in 1850, with one of the members of the Council serving as the President. The first president of the Common Council was pioneer David W. Alexander, who was elected in 1850 before resigning a year later. In 1889, the Los Angeles City Council was created under the first city charter, though the office stayed relatively the same.

=== New city charter ===
In 1965, the job of President Pro Tempore was created to preside during the absence of the President, with the first officer being councilman Thomas D. Shepard. Shepard presided when L. E. Timberlake became acting mayor due to mayor Sam Yorty traveling outside the country. The assistant pro tempore was created in 1977 with councilman Ernani Bernardi as the officer, who presided over meeting if both the President and the President Pro Tempore are out.

Councilman John Ferraro is the longest serving president, serving for 20 years in two terms. The first woman to be elected as the City Council president was Pat Russell, who held the title until 1987 when she was defeated in the City Council elections. The first Latino elected was Alex Padilla in 2001 after defeating incumbent Ruth Galanter; he served as acting mayor days after the 9/11 attacks as mayor James Hahn traveled out of the city. The first African-American president was Herb Wesson, who was elected in 2012 and served until 2020. The first Latina president was Nury Martinez, who was elected in 2020 and served until 2022.

== Responsibilities ==
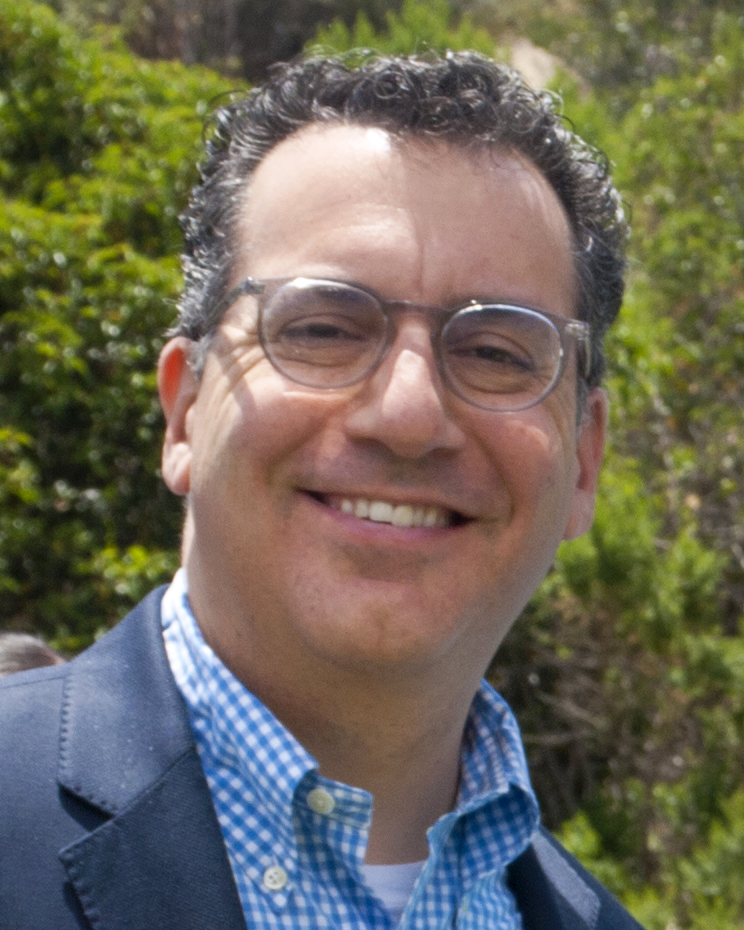
The President Pro Tempore is Bob Blumenfield since September 20, 2024.

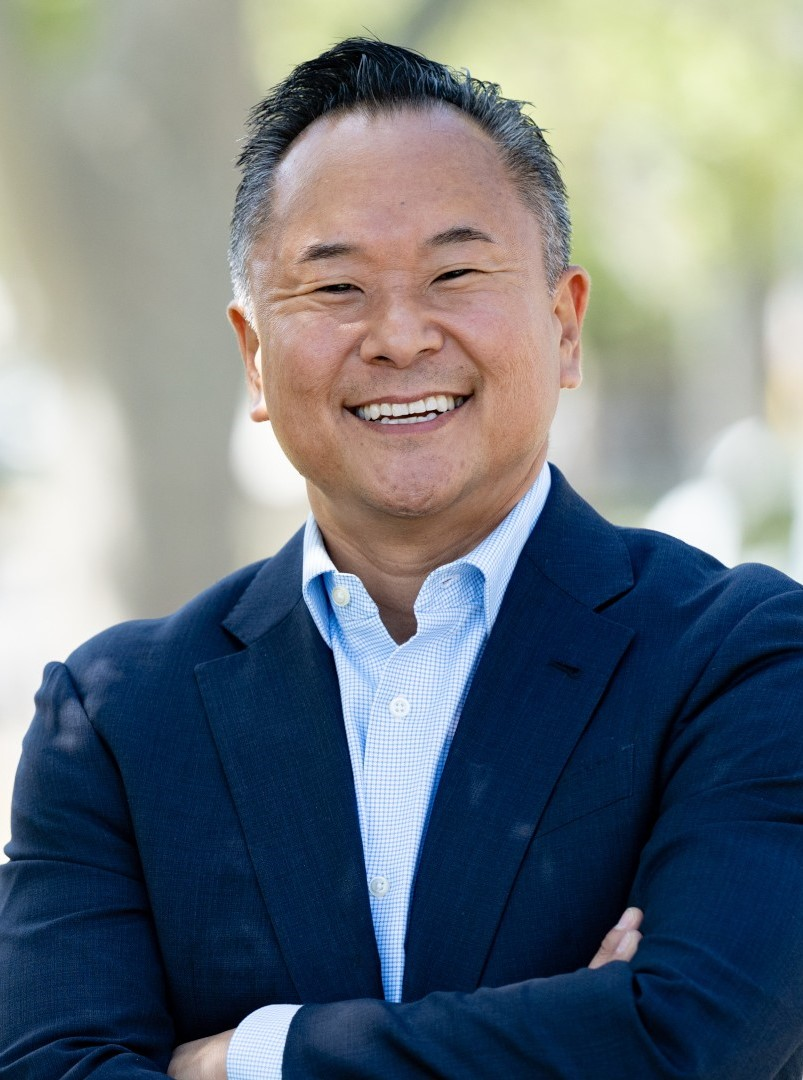
The Assistant President Pro Tempore is John Lee since April 14, 2026.

- presiding over meetings of the council.
- giving assignments to City Council committees.
- handling parliamentary duties like ruling motions in or out of order.
- serving as an acting mayor for the Mayor of Los Angeles if the office is vacant.

== List of presidents (1919–present) ==
No.	Portrait	Officeholder	Tenure start	Tenure end	Pro Tem.	Assistant Pro Tem.	Mayor
1		Boyle Workman (4th–Wilshire Center)	July 7, 1919	July 5, 1921	Office did not exist	Office did not exist	Meredith P. Snyder
2		Ralph Luther Criswell (7th–Vermont Square)	July 5, 1921	July 1, 1923	Office did not exist	Office did not exist	George E. Cryer
3		Boyle Workman (4th–Wilshire Center)	July 1, 1923	June 30, 1925	Office did not exist	Office did not exist	George E. Cryer
3		Boyle Workman (4th–Wilshire Center)	July 1, 1925	June 30, 1927	Office did not exist	Office did not exist	George E. Cryer
4		William G. Bonelli (14th–Eagle Rock)	July 1, 1927	June 30, 1929	Office did not exist	Office did not exist	George E. Cryer
5		Winfred J. Sanborn (9th–Boyle Heights)	July 1, 1929	June 30, 1931	Office did not exist	Office did not exist	John Clinton Porter
6		Charles H. Randall (1st–Sun Valley)	July 1, 1931	June 30, 1933	Office did not exist	Office did not exist	John Clinton Porter
7		Howard W. Davis (7th–Vermont Square)	July 1, 1933	June 30, 1935	Office did not exist	Office did not exist	Frank L. Shaw
8		Robert L. Burns (4th–Wilshire Center)	July 1, 1935	June 30, 1937	Office did not exist	Office did not exist	Frank L. Shaw
8		Robert L. Burns (4th–Wilshire Center)	July 1, 1937	June 30, 1939	Office did not exist	Office did not exist	Frank L. Shaw
8		Robert L. Burns (4th–Wilshire Center)	July 1, 1939	June 30, 1941	Office did not exist	Office did not exist	Fletcher Bowron
9		G. Vernon Bennett (10th–University Park)	July 1, 1941	June 30, 1943	Office did not exist	Office did not exist	Fletcher Bowron
10		Robert L. Burns (4th–Wilshire Center)	July 1, 1943	June 30, 1945	Office did not exist	Office did not exist	Fletcher Bowron
11		George H. Moore (15th–Wilmington)	July 1, 1945	June 30, 1947	Office did not exist	Office did not exist	Fletcher Bowron
12		Harold A. Henry (4th–Windsor Square)	July 1, 1947	June 30, 1949	Office did not exist	Office did not exist	Fletcher Bowron
12		Harold A. Henry (4th–Windsor Square)	July 1, 1949	June 30, 1951	Office did not exist	Office did not exist	Fletcher Bowron
12		Harold A. Henry (4th–Windsor Square)	July 1, 1951	June 30, 1953	Office did not exist	Office did not exist	Fletcher Bowron
13		John S. Gibson Jr. (15th–San Pedro)	July 1, 1953	June 30, 1955	Office did not exist	Office did not exist	Norris Poulson
13		John S. Gibson Jr. (15th–San Pedro)	July 1, 1955	June 30, 1957	Office did not exist	Office did not exist	Norris Poulson
13		John S. Gibson Jr. (15th–San Pedro)	July 1, 1957	June 30, 1959	Office did not exist	Office did not exist	Norris Poulson
13		John S. Gibson Jr. (15th–San Pedro)	July 1, 1959	June 30, 1961	Office did not exist	Office did not exist	Norris Poulson
14		Harold A. Henry (4th–Windsor Square)	July 1, 1961	June 30, 1963	Office did not exist	Office did not exist	Sam Yorty
15		L. E. Timberlake (6th–Gramercy Park)	July 1, 1963	June 30, 1965	Office did not exist	Office did not exist	Sam Yorty
15		L. E. Timberlake (6th–Gramercy Park)	July 1, 1965	June 30, 1967	Thomas D. Shepard	Office did not exist	Sam Yorty
15		L. E. Timberlake (6th–Gramercy Park)	July 1, 1967	June 30, 1969	John S. Gibson Jr.	Office did not exist	Sam Yorty
16		John S. Gibson Jr. (15th–San Pedro)	July 1, 1969	June 30, 1971	Billy G. Mills	Office did not exist	Sam Yorty
16		John S. Gibson Jr. (15th–San Pedro)	July 1, 1971	June 30, 1973	Billy G. Mills	Office did not exist	Sam Yorty
16		John S. Gibson Jr. (15th–San Pedro)	July 1, 1973	June 30, 1975	Robert J. Stevenson	Office did not exist	Tom Bradley
16		John S. Gibson Jr. (15th–San Pedro)	July 1, 1975	June 30, 1977	John Ferraro	Office did not exist	Tom Bradley
17		John Ferraro (4th–Hancock Park)	July 1, 1977	June 30, 1979	Joel Wachs	Ernani Bernardi	Tom Bradley
17		John Ferraro (4th–Hancock Park)	July 1, 1979	June 30, 1981	Joel Wachs	Ernani Bernardi	Tom Bradley
18		Joel Wachs (2nd–Studio City)	July 1, 1981	June 30, 1983	Peggy Stevenson	Ernani Bernardi	Tom Bradley
19		Pat Russell (6th–Westchester)	July 1, 1983	June 30, 1985	Peggy Stevenson	Ernani Bernardi	Tom Bradley
19		Pat Russell (6th–Westchester)	July 1, 1985	June 30, 1987	Joan Milke Flores	Ernani Bernardi	Tom Bradley
20		John Ferraro (4th–Hancock Park)	July 1, 1987	June 30, 1989	Marvin Braude	Ernani Bernardi	Tom Bradley
20		John Ferraro (4th–Hancock Park)	July 1, 1989	June 30, 1991	Marvin Braude	Joan Milke Flores	Tom Bradley
20		John Ferraro (4th–Hancock Park)	July 1, 1991	June 30, 1993	Marvin Braude	Joan Milke Flores	Tom Bradley
20		John Ferraro (4th–Hancock Park)	July 1, 1993	June 30, 1995	Marvin Braude	Richard Alatorre	Richard J. Riordan
20		John Ferraro (4th–Hancock Park)	July 1, 1995	June 30, 1997	Joel Wachs	Mike Hernandez	Richard J. Riordan
20		John Ferraro (4th–Hancock Park)	July 1, 1997	June 30, 1999	Joel Wachs	Ruth Galanter	Richard J. Riordan
20		John Ferraro (4th–Hancock Park)	July 1, 1999	April 17, 2001	Ruth Galanter	Rudy Svorinich	Richard J. Riordan
21		Ruth Galanter (6th–Venice)	April 17, 2001	July 1, 2001	Mark Ridley-Thomas	Rudy Svorinich	Richard J. Riordan
22		Alex Padilla (7th–Pacoima)	July 1, 2001	June 30, 2003	Mark Ridley-Thomas	Cindy Miscikowski	James Hahn
22		Alex Padilla (7th–Pacoima)	July 1, 2003	June 30, 2005	Cindy Miscikowski	Eric Garcetti	James Hahn
22		Alex Padilla (7th–Pacoima)	July 1, 2005	January 1, 2006	Wendy Greuel	Tony Cárdenas	Antonio Villaraigosa
23		Eric Garcetti (13th–Echo Park)	January 1, 2006	June 30, 2007	Wendy Greuel	Jan Perry	Antonio Villaraigosa
23		Eric Garcetti (13th–Echo Park)	July 1, 2007	June 30, 2009	Wendy Greuel	Jan Perry	Antonio Villaraigosa
23		Eric Garcetti (13th–Echo Park)	July 1, 2009	January 2, 2012	Jan Perry	Dennis Zine	Antonio Villaraigosa
24		Herb Wesson (10th–Mid City)	January 2, 2012	June 30, 2012	Ed Reyes	Tom LaBonge	Antonio Villaraigosa
24		Herb Wesson (10th–Mid City)	July 1, 2013	June 30, 2015	Mitchell Englander	Tom LaBonge	Eric Garcetti
24		Herb Wesson (10th–Mid City)	July 1, 2015	June 30, 2017	Mitchell Englander	Nury Martinez	Eric Garcetti
24		Herb Wesson (10th–Mid City)	July 1, 2017	December 31, 2018	Mitchell Englander	Nury Martinez	Eric Garcetti
24		Herb Wesson (10th–Mid City)	January 15, 2019	June 30, 2019	Nury Martinez	Joe Buscaino	Eric Garcetti
24		Herb Wesson (10th–Mid City)	July 1, 2019	January 5, 2020	Nury Martinez	Joe Buscaino	Eric Garcetti
25		Nury Martinez (6th–Sun Valley)	January 5, 2020	December 14, 2020	Joe Buscaino	David Ryu	Eric Garcetti
25		Nury Martinez (6th–Sun Valley)	December 14, 2020	June 30, 2021	Joe Buscaino	Vacant	Eric Garcetti
25		Nury Martinez (6th–Sun Valley)	July 1, 2021	September 21, 2021	Joe Buscaino	Vacant	Eric Garcetti
25		Nury Martinez (6th–Sun Valley)	October 1, 2021	October 10, 2022	Mitch O'Farrell	Vacant	Eric Garcetti
26		Paul Krekorian (2nd–Toluca Lake)	October 18, 2022	October 25, 2022	Mitch O'Farrell	Vacant	Eric Garcetti
26		Paul Krekorian (2nd–Toluca Lake)	October 25, 2022	December 12, 2022	Curren Price	Vacant	Eric Garcetti
26		Paul Krekorian (2nd–Toluca Lake)	December 12, 2022	June 13, 2023	Curren Price	Vacant	Karen Bass
26		Paul Krekorian (2nd–Toluca Lake)	June 13, 2023	June 20, 2023	Vacant	Vacant	Karen Bass
26		Paul Krekorian (2nd–Toluca Lake)	June 20, 2023	September 20, 2024	Marqueece Harris-Dawson	Bob Blumenfield	Karen Bass
27		Marqueece Harris-Dawson (8th–Gramercy Park)	September 20, 2024	December 10, 2024	Bob Blumenfield	Vacant	Karen Bass
27		Marqueece Harris-Dawson (8th–Gramercy Park)	December 10, 2024	January 28, 2025	Bob Blumenfield	Vacant	Karen Bass
27		Marqueece Harris-Dawson (8th–Gramercy Park)	January 28, 2025	April 14, 2026	Bob Blumenfield	Nithya Raman	Karen Bass
27		Marqueece Harris-Dawson (8th–Gramercy Park)	April 14, 2026	Incumbent	Bob Blumenfield	John Lee	Karen Bass

== President pro tempore ==
The President pro tempore of the Los Angeles City Council is the second-highest-ranking presiding officer of the Los Angeles City Council, serving directly below the Council President. The position was established in 1965. The President pro tempore presides over Council meetings when the Council President is absent and performs other duties assigned under the Council's rules.

=== List of Presidents pro tempore ===
- Thomas D. Shepard (1965–1967)
- Ernani Bernardi (1967–1971)
- John S. Gibson Jr. (1971–1975)
- John Ferraro (1975–1977)
- John S. Gibson Jr. (1977–1979)
- David S. Cunningham Jr. (1979–1981)
- John S. Gibson Jr. (1981–1985)
- Joan Milke Flores (1985–1987)
- John Ferraro (1987–1989)
- Joel Wachs (1989–1991)
- Ruth Galanter (1991–1993)
- Richard Alatorre (1993–1995)
- John Ferraro (1995–1997)
- Ruth Galanter (1997–1999)
- John Ferraro (1999–2001)
- Hal Bernson (2001–2003)
- Eric Garcetti (2003–2005)
- Alex Padilla (2005–2006)
- Jan Perry (2009–2011)
- Ed Reyes (2011–2013)
- Bernard C. Parks (2013–2015)
- Joe Buscaino (2015–2017)
- Mitchell Englander (2017–2019)
- Nury Martinez (2019–2020)
- Joe Buscaino (2020–2022)
- Marqueece Harris-Dawson (2022–2023)
- Bob Blumenfield (2024–present)

=== Assistant Presidents pro tempore ===
The Assistant President pro tempore of the Los Angeles City Council is a leadership position subordinate to the President pro tempore. The position was established in 1977. The Assistant President pro tempore assists the President pro tempore and may exercise the duties of that office when the President pro tempore is unavailable.

==== List of Assistant Presidents pro tempore ====
- Ernani Bernardi (1977–1979)
- John S. Gibson Jr. (1979–1981)
- Joan Milke Flores (1989–1993)
- Richard Alatorre (1993–1995)
- Ruth Galanter (1997–1999)
- Jan Perry (2006–2009)
- Dennis P. Zine (2009–2011)
- Ed Reyes (2011–2013)
- Bernard C. Parks (2013–2015)
- Tom LaBonge (2013–2015)
- Nury Martinez (2015–2019)
- Joe Buscaino (2019–2020)
- Curren D. Price Jr. (2020–2022)
- Bob Blumenfield (2022–2024)
- Nithya Raman (2025–2026)
- John Lee (2026–present)
