= Ruth Galanter =

American politician

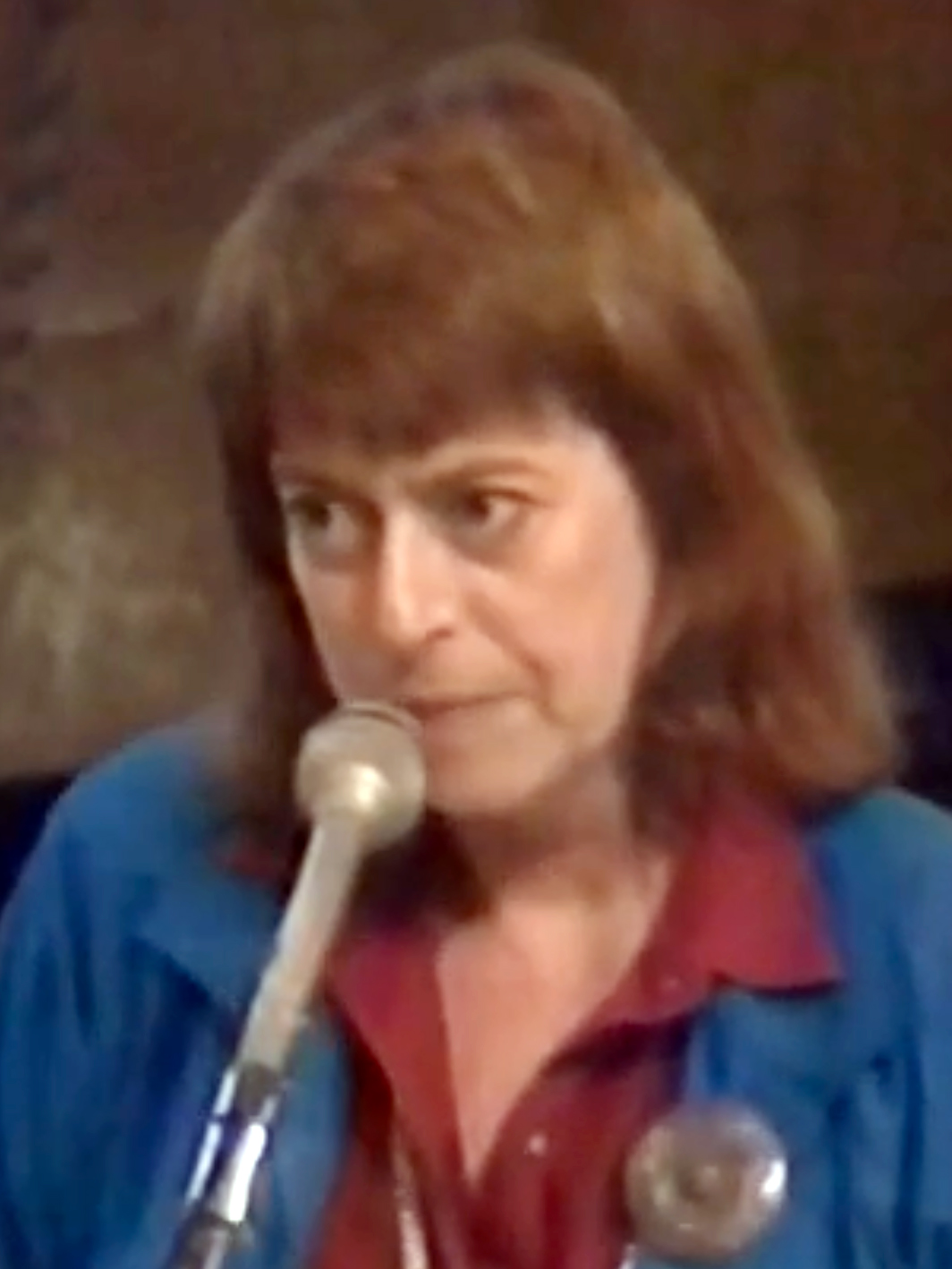
- Galanter in 1992

Member of the Los Angeles City Council from the 6th district
- In office July 1, 1987 – June 30, 2003
- Preceded by: Pat Russell
- Succeeded by: Tony Cardenas

President Pro Tempore of the Los Angeles City Council
- In office July 1, 1999 – June 30, 2001
- Preceded by: Joel Wachs
- Succeeded by: Mark Ridley-Thomas

Assistant President Pro Tempore of the Los Angeles City Council
- In office July 1, 1997 – June 30, 1999
- Preceded by: Mike Hernandez
- Succeeded by: Rudy Svorinich

Personal details
- Born: 1941 (age 84–85) New York City, U.S.
- Party: Democratic
- Education: University of Michigan; Yale University
- Occupation: Environmentalist, politician, consultant
- Ruth Galanter's voice Ruth Galanter asking to reconsider an item for the City Council; Recorded April 29, 1992

Ruth Galanter (born c. 1941) is an American politician, environmentalist and consultant with a background in urban planning. She served on the Los Angeles City Council from 1987 to 2003.

She is known for supporting "slow growth" policies on the city's Westside and elsewhere. She was the victim of a knife attack in an attempted home robbery that left her severely wounded.

She now has her own consulting business.

== Biography ==
=== Early life ===
Galanter was born about 1941 in New York City, the only child of a teacher and an advertising salesman. She grew up in the Bronx, New York, "dreaming of becoming an artist, or maybe an investigative reporter." Ruth's father died when she was age 6. She received her undergraduate degree from the University of Michigan and her master's degree in planning from Yale. She moved to Los Angeles in 1970.

=== Stabbing ===
On May 6, 1987, Galanter was "brutally assaulted" in her Venice home in the 2200 block of Louella Avenue by an intruder who left her in critical condition with stab wounds in her neck. The intruder entered through a screen window at the back of the house. Neighbors heard screaming and the sound of a burglar alarm that Galanter was able to trigger after the attack. "One wound severed the carotid artery that supplies blood to the left side of the brain, and the other punctured the pharynx, part of the food tube near the esophagus."

Police soon tabbed Mark Allen Olds, who lived in a rooming house across the street from Galanter, as a suspect. Police Chief Daryl Gates said Olds was "a former gang member with an extensive record of arrests, including two for a 1979 gang murder and others for drug use." At his trial Galanter testified that she had suffered "permanent damage" to her throat and was "too frightened to sleep through the night." A reporter wrote sixteen years later that the attack had left Galanter's "New York-accented voice with a slight croak."

A jury found Olds guilty of first-degree burglary and second-degree attempted murder involving great bodily injury and the use of a knife. It acquitted him of a more serious charge of attempted murder with premeditation, which could have carried a life sentence. Olds was sentenced to the maximum term, 14 years and 4 months, but was expected to serve only about 6 1/2 years with time off for good behavior.

Galanter made a study-trip to Antarctica in January 1989 as an "exotic vacation" she had promised herself as she lay in bed bleeding from the knife attack.

== Environment ==
While a Yale student, Galanter and "scores of others" opposed a New Haven urban renewal program that would have bulldozed buildings and cut streets through poor and working-class neighborhoods. In 1973, she was the first California resident to file an appeal under the state's Coastal Preservation Act against an approved project—a Santa Monica plan "first proposed as 1,480 luxury residential units [that in the end] wound up as 340 condos and 160 units for seniors."

In 1973, working as the newsletter editor with the National Health Law Program, a federally funded legal-services program for the poor, she was part of a group endorsing a statewide campaign for national and state health insurance.

Living in Santa Monica at the time, Galanter was active in opposition to a 1976 plan to move two decrepit frame Carpenter Gothic houses from their Ocean Avenue addresses north of Wilshire Boulevard to a city-owned lot in Ocean Park, turning one into an upscale restaurant and the other into a historic museum. Both were built around the start of the 20th century, one of them by Roy Jones, son of Senator John P. Jones, founder of Santa Monica. The opposition was enough to kill the project, dubbed Heritage Square, which was eventually finished years later under tighter regulations.

In 1979, she became the Southern California director of the California League of Conservation Voters.

== Public service ==
=== Coastal Commission ===
Galanter was appointed to the South Coast Regional Coastal Commission by Governor Jerry Brown in January 1977. She was elected chairman in 1980. Decisions on affordable housing, she said, were "probably the most controversial facing the commission."

After leaving the commission, she started her own planning consulting firm. One of her clients was the State Coastal Conservancy Commission, "an agency charged with restoring damaged coastal lands." As such, she "worked to preserve wetlands threatened by development in Long Beach and Huntington Beach."

=== City Council ===
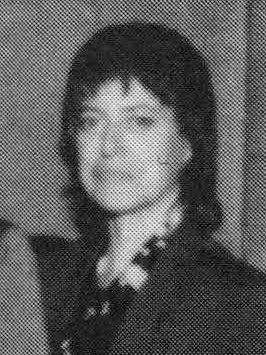
Galanter in 1989 in the City Council chambers.

==== Elections ====
In 1987, Los Angeles City Council District 6 was a "diverse area" that included "racially mixed" Venice and Mar Vista, as well as predominantly white Westchester and mostly black Crenshaw.

In the primary election of April 1987 against incumbent Pat Russell, Galanter "stunned Russell by capturing 29% of the primary vote to Russell's 42%." Battling for votes in the final election, the Russell camp made much of the fact that Tom Hayden, "a powerful and controversial 1960s figure" was supporting Galanter and that she also had the support of the Venice Town Council, a civic group "composed mostly of left-wing activists." It was said that Galanter was attempting a "liberal balancing act."

She knew radical and anti-war activist Tom Hayden in college and endorsed him when he ran for the California Assembly in 1982. Some of her opponents suggested she was a pawn of left-wingers, a charge she rejected. Hayden said later he would make no endorsements in her race against Russell, but at the last moment did exactly that, impelling the Russell campaign to send out "mail informing voters of Hayden's endorsement."

Galanter won the June 1987 final vote, 21,846 to 15,855 in what the Los Angeles Times called "a dramatic election that signals the rise of a new constituency in city politics and sends troubling signals to the mayor's office" (Tom Bradley). The Times added:

Russell brought money, at least $400,000, and establishment backing into the race. They were no match for Galanter's army of neighborhood activists, made up of Democrats, Republicans, suburban homeowners and bohemian renters. . . . The election was also widely regarded as a harbinger of a new brand of politics in the city, with Galanter leading a protest against the effect of development on traffic, air and water pollution and neighborhood tranquility. . . . On the advice of three consulting firms hired after the primary, Russell sought to put Galanter on the defensive with a blizzard of campaign literature picturing her as a Hayden crony whose campaign was being run by Venice radicals.

Four years later, a tough fight against six other candidates—including Tavis Smiley, later known as a radio and television commentator— forced Galanter into a runoff with Republican Mary Lee Gray, who was an aide to County Supervisor Deane Dana and who polled well "in portions of the affluent Venice Peninsula, as well as the Crenshaw District. Galanter had to "fend off charges that she has gotten too close to developers and lobbyists," and she was criticized for "large projects in her district, including the sprawling Playa Vista development near Marina del Rey."

Galanter, however, won the final, 18,153 votes to 7,998.

==== Positions ====
===== Slow growth =====
One of her passions, the Philadelphia Inquirer reported,

sweeping Southern California with new political vigor, is limiting growth in the vast Los Angeles basin. In the fight against forests of new high-rise office towers, new oil-drilling rigs, new mini-malls, sewage in Santa Monica Bay, more smog over the Hollywood hills and, most of all, more traffic on the freeways, Galanter is a suddenly renowned advocate of what has come to be known as the slow-growth movement.

Galanter "vehemently opposed" major development projects in her district, including the proposed Howard Hughes Center, a 3.1-million-square-foot project. "The Pentagon is 3.7 million square feet," she said. "We're talking about putting the Pentagon on one side of the San Diego Freeway."

===== Playa Vista =====
. . . she got swallowed up in pragmatism. . . . She had a chance to step up to the plate and she sort of sagged up there instead.

— Tom Hayden, on Galanter's vote favoring Playa Vista.

Strongly opposed to the plans of Summa Corporation for a 1,087-acre piece of prime vacant land at the foot of the Westchester Bluffs when she first entered the City Council in 1987—"one of the largest real estate developments ever contemplated for Los Angeles"—Galanter spent much of her time afterward in trying to mitigate the effects of the proposed $7 billion residential, retail and hotel package; she did, in the end, vote in favor of the deal as it was finally put forth by Maguire Thomas Partners in 1993.

That "especially wrenching" vote caused dissension among her backers, but it was later noted that the deal "would preserve 270 acres of the Ballona Wetlands, create a riparian corridor, pour millions into easing traffic problems and put recycling facilities in place" and that "She also won commitments for affordable housing units."

===== Other =====
Beach sleeping, 1987. She called for tougher laws to ban overnight sleeping on the city's beaches.

Nuclear reactors, 1988. Calling the Metropolitan Water District's idea of a nuclear plant near the Los Angeles International Airport a "bad April Fools' joke," Galanter called for a citywide ban on construction of that or any other reactor "not used for research." The MWD was making a preliminary study of locations for a nuclear plant to produce electricity and convert seawater to drinking water.

Wildlife preserve, 1990. She asked that 200 acres be set aside near Los Angeles International Airport for a wildlife preserve because at least ten endangered species lived there.

Animal shelters, 1992, Galanter sought a grand jury probe of conditions in the city's animal shelters, maintaining that animals in the city's six shelters "are treated inhumanely and are often destroyed within hours after arriving."

Pay raise, 1993–95. Galanter declined to accept a pay raise, which was "automatically granted by City Charter, in 1993 and 1994, but accepted it in 1995, bringing her salary to the level of Municipal Court judges—$98,069 per year.

Airports, 1998–99. She opposed expansion plans at Los Angeles International Airport but favored them at Palmdale Airport. Both sites are under the ownership of the city of Los Angeles.

Venice Canals, 1991. Ruth Galanter inherited a neighborhood sponsored assessment for improving the Venice Canals, but the final design selection and ultimate canal improvements in 1991 can be credited to Galanter's leadership as a Los Angeles City Councilwoman.

The original assessment project was sponsored by the Venice Canals Association (VCA) in 1976 during Pat Russell's term as council member. Venice Canals Association board members Barbara Michalak, Les Otterstrom, Paula Tate, Marla Engel, Ruth Ann Steffens, Fred Hoffman, Anita Henkins, Joseph Smith, W. Reid Monroe, Bonnie Felix, and Murray Leral worked to establish the assessment district for the Venice Canal Improvement Project. The first attempted design for the 1977 Venice Canals Assessment district was prepared by City of Los Angeles public works under the direction of City Engineer Luis Ganajas. The design was known as the vertical wall plan, similar to the existing Marina Del Rey walls, and was vertical solid cement with a decorative end cap. At the time there were at least three historic attempts to restore or rehabilitate the Venice Canals, all eventually leading to failure or opposition. The last attempt was a deep water plan that was stopped in the 1960s. Mayor Tom Bradley publicly stated "The Venice Canals will not be improved in my lifetime."

After Ruth Galanter was elected, she stated that she was not happy with the environmental aspects, the costs, the historical design and the safety of the vertical wall plan, so one of her early actions was to stop the city engineers from pursuing the vertical wall plan. Galanter asked the state agency California Coastal Conservancy to review the options for a canal improvement project. The Coastal Conservancy made several plans suggestions, including one using Armorflex. Armorflex was a cement material connected by cables and had holes allowing for plant growth and a gentle slope. A test site was installed on Eastern bank of Sherman Canal near the Dell Ave. Bridge. The Armorflex test site turned out to be a failure, with the plants not growing out of the block, and it looked awful aesthetically. The majority of the neighbor who would be assessed by the new design were now opposed to the Armorflex plan, and in a poll stated that they would rather have no plan than one that included Armorflex. A poll by the City of Los Angeles found that over 79 percent of the homeowners opposed the assessment project using the Armorflex material.

After being elected, Ruth Galanter held several meetings with the Venice Canals Association under the leadership of Mark Galanty about the Canal improvement project. Galanter had said she would be open to other plans, but for the time she would continue the Armorflex design. Based on public meetings and city polling it was clear that the Armorflex plan would not be approved by the property owners and the project would fail again.

Mark Galanty assembled a committee of the VCA to locate a compromise design and material. Loffelstein, or Loffel Block, was identified by a VCA committee member Andy Shores as possibly meeting those goals. It allowed plants to grow inside the material, could be placed on a slope to allow birds and wildlife to climb out of the canals, was safe for small children as it allowed them to hold on to the sides, and or climb out of the Canals, was lower cost project over the Armorflex design, and was aesthetically pleasing to the property owners. Mark Galanty recruited canal resident architects to create a design board with the Loffel Block material, and Galanty publicly presented the Loffel design Plan at a public meeting with Councilwoman Galanter in attendance. Galanter stated she would be open to the Venice Canals Association design material. Mark Galanty got the Loffel Block distributor in Orange County to install a test site across from the Armorflex test site at the distributors cost. The test was successful with plants growing in the blocks, wildlife and ducks able to climb up the material, and the majority of the property owners supporting this design. Galanter agreed to have city engineers design an official city plan using the Loffel Block. Luis Ganajas revised the plans to include the material Loffel Block at 55 degree slope. VCA members Robert Trask and Mark Galanty took the city design, an actual Loffel Block, and the community support poll showing overwhelming support to different Venice groups, city government agencies, state agencies, environmental groups, historical groups, and each property owner on the canals getting support for what was termed "The Compromise Plan". Eventually, letters of support for the Loffel plan were presented to the city from the Sierra Club, Heal the Bay, the local state senator and state assemblyman, both U.S. senators, and the local county supervisor. Based on the support of the Loffel Block design over the Armorflex design, Councilwoman Galanter had Public Works drop the Armorflex plan and focused on the Loffel Block plan.

Councilwoman Galanter and staff member Jim Bichart, as well as city engineer Luis Ganajas and environmental engineer Russ Ruffing worked on the city, state and national approvals. At the Coastal Commission hearing the Venice Canals Association supported the plan, and there was finally no opposition to the restoring of the Venice Canals. The estimated costs for the improvements was 6.3 million dollars, and included dredging the canals and removing the soil to a class 1 toxic site, removing crumbling sidewalks, replacing with new sidewalks, 5 feet deep in center, 1 1/2 feet on the sides, Loffel black at 55 degrees through the canals. Rebuilding the foot bridges that go over the canals. The City Engineers designed Atriplex, aka Salt Bush, as a natural hedge along the canal banks as a safety barrier to the canals. The property owners in the canals paid approximately $6,600 over a 10-year period for a 30- by 90-foot lot frontage, and $7,800 for a 40- by 90-foot lot frontage. Work began in March 1992, and was completed in 1993. The assessment could be paid in full, or paid over time with interest at approximately 5%.

==== San Fernando Valley ====
In July 2002, the city council voted to move Galanter's entire 6th District into the East San Fernando Valley, including Arleta, Sun Valley and parts of Van Nuys, North Hollywood, Panorama City and Pacoima, because of the increase of population in the Valley. At first opposed to the move, Galanter later embraced it and "unveiled an ambitious plan to curb flooding in Sun Valley, remove hundreds of pieces of discarded furniture throughout the district, repair streets and energize the political culture of a district known for voter apathy."

Galanter worked with the community to get a $50,000 sculpture installed at Van Nuys Airport—"a piece of public art demanded by some people who were outraged over a series of bronze statues that they said were a poor fit for the airport." The Los Angeles Daily News reported that:

Galanter said the project represents the first time a Los Angeles community was able to select the kind of art it wanted under the city's program that funnels 1 percent of developers' fees to public art. The winning design is a 15-foot-high concrete replica of an airplane wing, adorned with a bronze eagle. Its base is surrounded by figurines from aviation and Hollywood —Amelia Earhart, Howard Hughes, Bobbi Trout—who helped shape the history of the 75-year-old facility where the final scene from the classic "Casablanca" was filmed.

== Later career ==
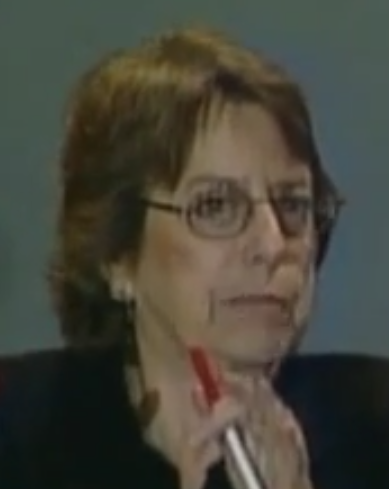
Galanter in 2006.

In 2005-06, Galanter occupied the Bellarmine College Visiting Chair in Los Angeles Urban Research at Loyola Marymount University. At that time she was the principal of Galanter and Company, a consulting firm specializing in "land use, urban infrastructure, environmental policy and political strategy."

== Legacies ==
Galanter said when she left office she believed her "most lasting legacy" would be a law requiring low-flush toilets in homes.

Preceded by Pat Russell	Los Angeles City Council; 6th District; 1987–2002	Succeeded by Tony Cardenas
Preceded by John Ferraro	President of the Los Angeles City Council; 2001	Succeeded by Alex Padilla
Preceded by Joel Wachs	President Pro Tempore of the Los Angeles City Council; 1997–1999	Succeeded by Mark Ridley-Thomas
Preceded by Mike Hernandez	Assistant President Pro Tempore of the Los Angeles City Council; 1999–2001	Succeeded by Rudy Svorinich
