= Peggy Stevenson =

American politician

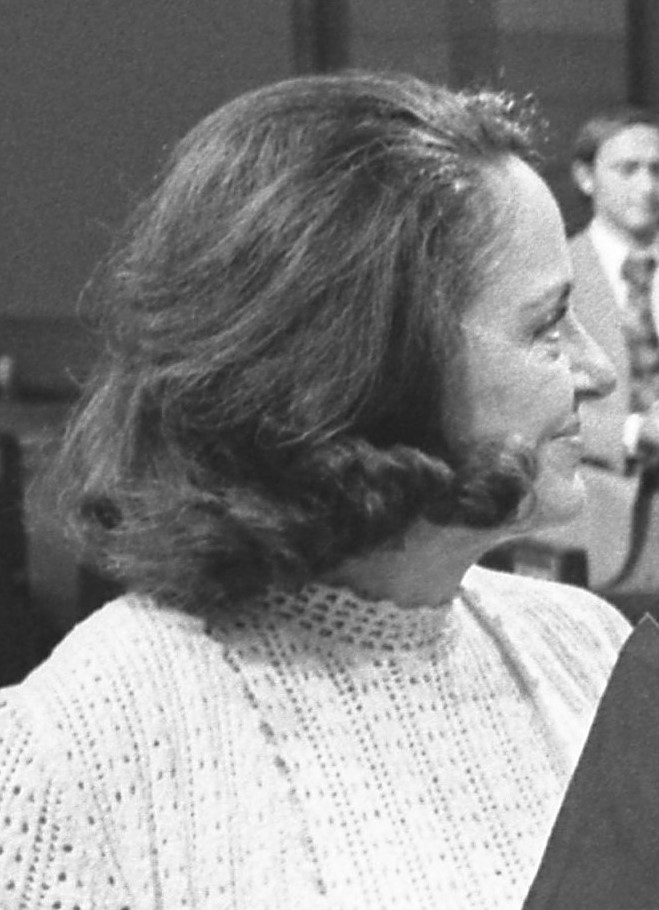
- Stevenson in 1976

President pro tempore of the Los Angeles City Council
- In office July 1, 1981 – June 30, 1985
- Preceded by: Joel Wachs
- Succeeded by: Joan Milke Flores

Member of the Los Angeles City Council from the 13th district
- In office May 27, 1975 – June 30, 1985
- Preceded by: Robert J. Stevenson
- Succeeded by: Michael Woo

Personal details
- Born: January 29, 1924 Harrisburg, Pennsylvania, U.S.
- Died: October 16, 2014 (aged 90) Fountain Valley, California, U.S.
- Party: Democratic
- Spouse: Robert J. Stevenson
- Occupation: Politician

Peggy Stevenson (January 29, 1924 – October 16, 2014) was an American politician who served on the Los Angeles City Council for the District 13 from 1975 to 1985. The wife of Robert J. Stevenson, she was elected after her husband's death in 1975 and was re-elected twice. She lost to Michael Woo in 1985.

== Personal life ==
Peggy Stevenson was born in Los Angeles on January 29, 1924, the daughter of Mr. and Mrs. Victor Constance, who had immigrated from Greece. She had a sister, Catherine. Peggy graduated from Fairfax High School and then attended UCLA, where she graduated with a bachelor's degree in political science. She was a member of St. Sophia Greek Orthodox Cathedral. After graduating she became assistant radio director of an advertising agency, where she met Robert.

She was "only a little over 5 feet tall" and said that she had to alter her own clothes to fit.

Peggy was chairwoman of an annual fundraiser for underprivileged children sponsored by the show-business Masquers Club, as well as being active in the Retired Senior Volunteer Program. She was awarded an honorary doctorate of humane letters from Columbia College in Hollywood.

She and Robert had a son, Bruce, born in 1956. The family lived in the Hollywood Hills, just above Sunset Boulevard. Peggy Stevenson died on October 16, 2014, aged 90, in Fountain Valley, California. She was survived by her son and a sister, Katherine Nicolay.

== Elections ==
=== Special ===
Peggy Stevenson won a special election for the 13th District seat on May 27, 1975, over Irving Kaspar and 27 other candidates. With her seating on June 9, she and Council Member Pat Russell became the only two elected women up to then to serve on the council at the same time.

=== Michael Woo ===
Peggy Stevenson's two electoral battles against Michael Woo were heated. Endorsed by Police Chief Daryl Gates, she won her first fight against Woo in 1981 by a vote of 20,162 to 13,018, but Woo was victorious in 1985 by 16,417 to 12,052.

1981. In the 1981 race, Stevenson jettisoned the volunteers that had guided her primary campaign and hired Butcher-Forde Consulting of Orange County for the final vote, which was criticized for having "racial overtones." Even her primary campaign had been criticized for sending out fliers asking Republican voters if they wanted the candidate supported by the Mexican American Political Association and the Asian Democratic Caucus "or Councilwoman Peggy Stevenson." She denied they were meant to raise racial questions but simply to point up Woo's "ultraliberal" support.

At one point, a debate between Stevenson and Woo "exploded into a verbal brawl" when the former, 56, attempted to turn Wilbur Woo, the father of 29-year-old Michael Woo, into the major issue of the campaign. She called him "a wealthy banker who doesn't even live in Los Angeles, let alone our district," and who "has put together a $300,000 bankroll from his associates and from borrowers of his bank to finance a totally immoral and untruthful campaign against me." The Los Angeles Times reported:

The candidates tried to outdo each other as champions of gay rights and rent control. Woo ridiculed economic development in the district and Stevenson said she had brought in one billion dollars worth of construction in four years. Woo said he'd like to see proof.

1985. The 1985 race was an expensive one—expected to be a million dollars for both candidates together. Stevenson was supported by "some of the city's most prominent political fund-raisers" and the "real estate industry," while Woo could again count on his banker-businessman father.

Stevenson blamed a "Westside political organization" headed by U.S. Representatives Henry Waxman and Howard Berman for her loss. In an "unusual rebuke," the Times reported, her fellow Council Members Zev Yaroslavsky and Marvin Braude had endorsed Woo over her, "partly because they said she was too supportive of projects in their districts backed by big developers who contributed to her campaign."

=== Positions ===
Peggy Stevenson and Councilman Joel Wachs sponsored what Wachs called "the strongest gay rights ordinance in the U.S.," prohibiting job and housing discrimination based on sexual preference.

On the council, she was chairwoman of the police, fire, and civil-defense committee, of which, she said, "Historically it's been a man's committee." She was part of a delegation that traveled to Greece to successfully secure the 1984 Summer Olympics for Los Angeles.

Other positions:

1980. Peggy Stevenson charged that there was an "alarming trend toward overdeployment of police for relatively minor disturbances at gay bars" and held a hearing before her Police, Fire and Public Safety Committee on the situation.

1985. As a member of the Recreation, Library and Cultural Affairs Committee, she voted in favor of doubling the park ranger staff of the Recreation and Parks Department and allowing the rangers to carry guns.

Preceded by Robert J. Stevenson	Los Angeles City Council; 13th District; 1975–85	Succeeded by Michael Woo
Preceded by Billy G. Mills	President Pro Tempore of the Los Angeles City Council; 1981–85	Succeeded by John Ferraro
