= John Ferraro =

American politician (1924–2001)

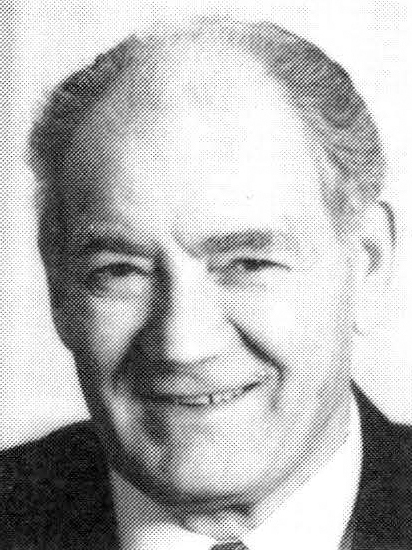
- Official portrait, 1986

Member of the Los Angeles City Council from the 4th district
- In office May 25, 1966 – April 17, 2001
- Preceded by: Harold A. Henry
- Succeeded by: Tom LaBonge

President of the Los Angeles City Council
- In office July 1, 1987 – April 17, 2001
- Preceded by: Pat Russell
- Succeeded by: Alex Padilla
- In office July 1, 1977 – June 30, 1981
- Preceded by: John S. Gibson Jr.
- Succeeded by: Joel Wachs

President Pro Tempore of the Los Angeles City Council
- In office July 1, 1975 – June 30, 1977
- Preceded by: Robert Stevenson
- Succeeded by: Joel Wachs

Personal details
- Born: May 14, 1924 Cudahy, California, U.S.
- Died: April 17, 2001 (aged 76) Santa Monica, California, U.S.
- Party: Democratic
- Spouses: Julie Luckey (divorced) Margaret Hart (m. 1982; died 2000)
- Children: 1
- Football career

USC Trojans
- Position: Tackle

Career information
- High school: Bell
- College: USC (1944)

Awards and highlights
- Consensus All-American (1944); First-team All-American (1947); Second-team All-American (1946); 2× First-team All-PCC (1946, 1947)

John Ferraro (May 14, 1924 – April 17, 2001) was an American politician and businessman who was a Democratic member of the Los Angeles City Council from 1966 until his death in 2001, the longest tenure of any member in the city's history. Before politics, he was an insurance broker, and had been an all-American football player at the University of Southern California.

== Biography ==
=== Parents and education ===
Ferraro was born May 14, 1924, in the working class suburb of Cudahy, California, just south of Los Angeles, "the youngest son of a family of eight children whose Italian immigrant parents ran a macaroni factory before going broke during the Depression." He attended Bell High School in Bell, California, where he graduated in 1942, and he earned a Bachelor of Science degree in business administration from the University of Southern California after World War II.

=== Military service ===
Ferraro enlisted in the U.S. Navy during World War II and was commissioned as an ensign in 1945. He served on a tanker with Warren Christopher, later the Secretary of State under Bill Clinton. "Christopher got Ferraro interested in politics during long, early morning discussions when they were stationed in the Bay Area."

=== Football ===
His excellence on the football field at Bell High—he was a unanimous choice for the All-City team—led to his receiving a scholarship at USC, where he earned All-American honors in 1944 and 1947 and played as a tackle in three Rose Bowls. He was inducted into the College Football Hall of Fame in 1974. As an adult he stood 6 feet, 4¼ inches tall and weighed 245 pounds, earning him the nickname "Big John." Ferraro was drafted in the sixth round of the 1946 NFL draft by the Green Bay Packers.

=== Business career ===
Ferraro was an insurance broker with the John Ferraro Company, beginning in 1951, and he invested shrewdly in stocks and real estate that made him a millionaire.

=== Family ===
He was married to Julie Marie Luckey, daughter of Democratic State Senator E. George Luckey, and they had a son, Luckeygian, or Lucky, born about 1956. The Ferraros were divorced in 1972. His second wife was Bridget Margaret Hart, widely known as exotic dancer and stripteaser Margie Hart in the 1940s—and then as a legitimate actress who even later made money through real-estate investments. They met at a reception in support of Democrat Pierre Salinger's unsuccessful U.S. Senate campaign in 1964, and they were married in 1982. She died in 2000.

=== Illness and death ===
Ferraro was diagnosed with cancer of the spleen in August 1999 and underwent chemotherapy. Mayor Richard Riordan was at his side, along with family members, when he died at the age of 76 in Santa Monica on April 17, 2001. A crowd of nearly a thousand filled St. Brendan Catholic Church, Ferraro's parish, for a funeral mass conducted by Cardinal Roger Mahony. Family present included Ferraro's brother, Steve, sisters Mary and Rose and his son, Gianni Luckey.

== Public service ==
=== Police commission ===
He entered government service in 1953, when Mayor Norris Poulson appointed him to the city Police Commission, where he served for thirteen years. During that period, he advocated more-stringent gun laws and backed African-American John Roseboro, former Los Angeles Dodgers star, to do community relations work for the Police Department after the 1965 Watts riots.

=== City Council ===
==== Appointment and elections ====
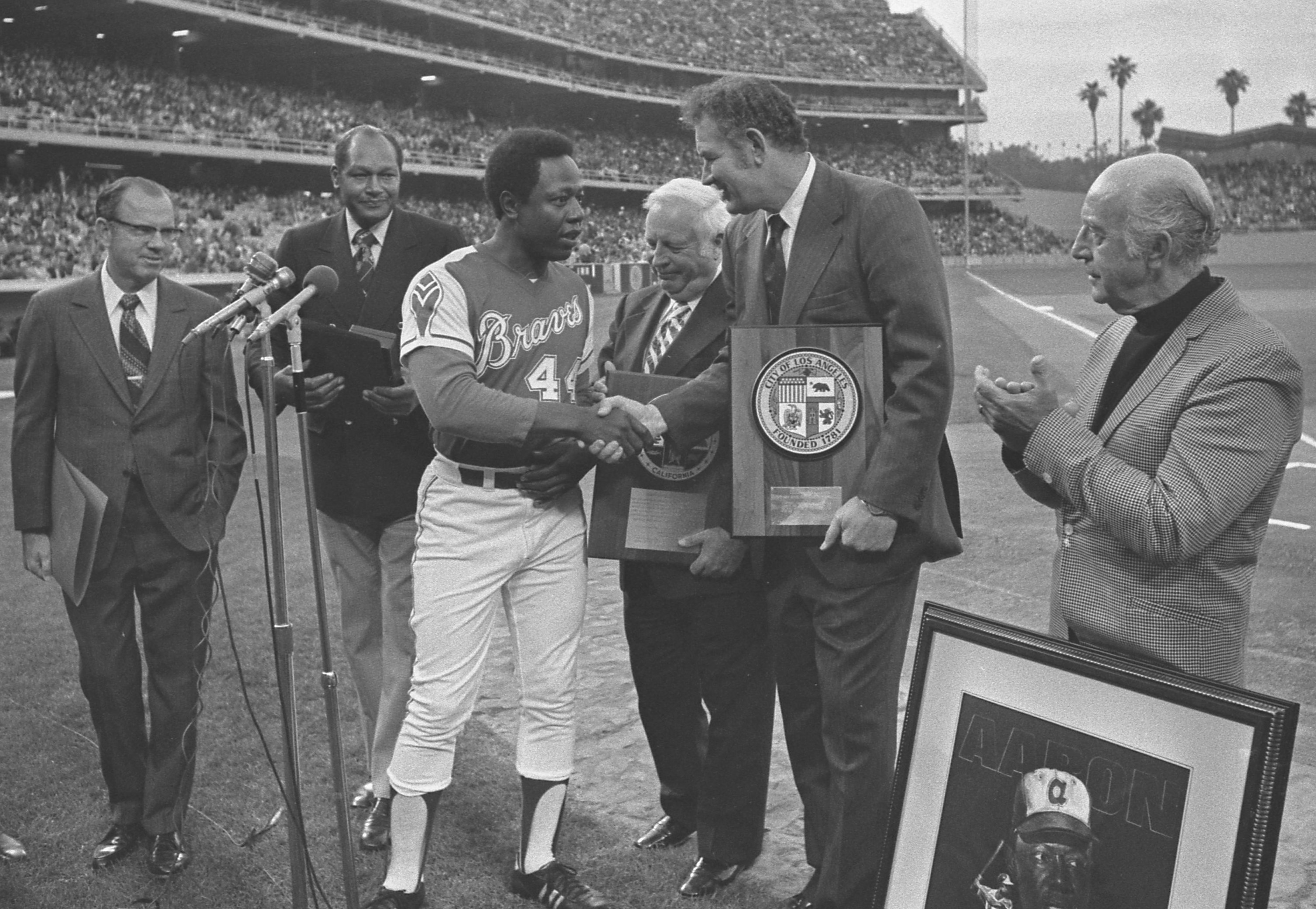
Ferraro with other council-members honoring Hank Aaron in 1974.

Supported by Mayor Sam Yorty and seen as a "product of the old guard of conservative if nominally Democratic politicians who used to dominate local politics," he was appointed in May 1966 from among thirteen applicants to represent Los Angeles City Council District 4 after the death of incumbent Harold A. Henry. Because of his height, when he took office carpenters had to remove a drawer from his desk so that his legs could fit under it.

During his term, which at thirty-five years was the longest in City Council history, the 4th District covered (in 1955) much of the Wilshire district and in general was bounded by Fountain Avenue, Wilshire Boulevard, Fairfax Avenue and Catalina Street and (in 1975) Central Los Angeles from Fairfax and Highland Avenues on the west, to Santa Monica Boulevard on the north, the Pasadena Freeway on the east and Olympic Boulevard on the south (1945). In 1986 it was considered a contorted district that included the old areas as well as Atwater, Griffith Park, Forest Lawn Drive and parts of the central San Fernando Valley to Colfax Avenue and Victory Boulevard. In 1989 the district stretched from Hancock Park to Studio City.

In 1974, Ferraro ran unsuccessfully against fellow Councilman Edmund D. Edelman for a seat on the Los Angeles County Board of Supervisors, and in 1985, he made a futile run against Tom Bradley for mayor.

In 1999, he was fined $3,300 by the Los Angeles Ethics Commission for receiving campaign contributions in 1997 above a newly established limit. It and penalties levied against Councilmen Mike Hernandez and Mark Ridley-Thomas were the first to be made under a law effective in 1985.

==== Presidency ====
Ferraro's election as City Council president in 1977 to replace John Gibson allowed him to make committee appointments and set a general direction for the council. In that year he restructured the committee system to "reflect concerns about the environment and city finances." It advanced him to the second most powerful position in the city and made him acting mayor when Tom Bradley was out of town. Ferraro later denied he used his committee appointing power "to reward allies and punish enemies," but he admitted to being practical: "Anybody who mistreats their friends to benefit their enemies is not practicing good politics," he said. "You don't get reelected to the presidency that way."

In Ferraro's 1997 reshuffle of committee seats, the biggest loser was Nate Holden, "the frequent butt of Ferraro's jokes, who was ousted from all three of his committees and given far lower-profile assignments," Jodi Wilgoren reported in the Los Angeles Times.

It was said that Ferraro often calmed disputes on the City Council "with humor and a firm hand" and that after his death it was "unlikely such a dominant figure will again emerge," because of newly imposed term limits at City Hall.

==== Activities ====
Ferraro was noted for "spearheading the refurbishment of the Los Angeles Zoo", for "bringing the new Staples Center arena to a revitalized downtown" and helping to attract the 2000 Democratic National Convention to Los Angeles. Other activities:

1984. Ferraro's "biggest citywide leadership role was in helping bring the Olympics to Los Angeles, serving on early committees trying to attract the Games."

1985. Ferraro was considered pro-development, and he usually supported most everything that building industry leaders wanted, one exception being rent control because of the large number of elderly renters in his district.

1989. He opposed building underground transportation lines (subways), believing instead that mass transit should run along freeways or, in the San Fernando Valley, along existing rail lines.

1996. The City Council president opposed Mayor Richard Riordan's plans for a City Charter revision commission to be elected by the voters, on the grounds that it would be chaotic and would undermine the council's authority. He wanted a committee of experts in public policy and constitutional law appointed by the City Council itself. In the end, both panels were set up and worked on their own drafts for a charter revision.

1997. With County Supervisor Zev Yaroslavsky, Ferraro opposed a plan by Universal Studios to add 5.9 million square feet to its theme park attractions in Universal City, with resort hotels and additional parking lots. The two legislators urged the proposal be cut by 40%.

== Honors ==
Ferraro was elected to the board of the National League of Cities in 1995, and in March 1996 the Los Angeles Marathon named him Citizen of the Year, the University of Southern California gave him its Asa V. Call Achievement Award and the National Council of Young Israel gave him a community-service award.

For his contribution to sports in Los Angeles, he was honored with a Los Angeles Memorial Coliseum "Court of Honor" plaque by the Coliseum commissioners.

== Legacy ==
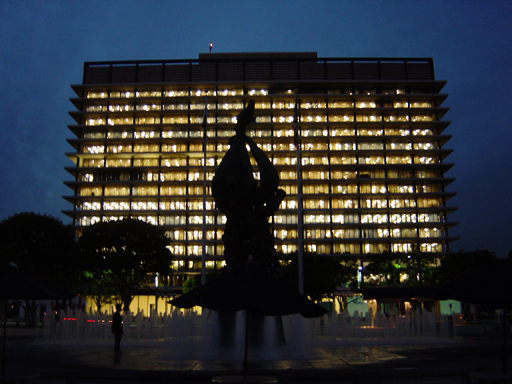
The John Ferraro Building in Downtown Los Angeles

On November 16, 2000, in honor of his more than five decades of public service, the City of Los Angeles renamed the landmark Department of Water and Power's General Office Building to the John Ferraro Building. The building was designed by the architects AC Martin Partners, Inc. and opened in 1964.

The Margaret and John Ferraro Chair in Effective Local Government was established at the School of Policy, Planning and Development of the University of Southern California.

== Quotations ==
- About Mayor Tom Bradley: "Morally, he's corrupt. His desire to be governor is so overwhelming, it's eating him up. He will sell out City Hall to be governor."
- About his USC football days: "I was a tackle. Sure, we never got any glory, no headlines, and that's been my philosophy."

Political offices
Preceded by Harold A. Henry	Los Angeles City Council; 4th District; 1966–2001	Succeeded by Tom LaBonge
Preceded by Pat Russell	President of the Los Angeles City Council; 1987–2001; 1977–1981	Succeeded by Ruth Galanter
Preceded by John S. Gibson Jr.	President of the Los Angeles City Council; 1987–2001; 1977–1981	Succeeded by Joel Wachs
Preceded by Robert Stevenson	President Pro Tempore of the Los Angeles City Council; 1975-1977	Succeeded by Joel Wachs
