= Margaret Hart Ferraro =

American burlesque performer (1913–2000)

- Born: Margaret Bridget Bryan; September 28, 1913; Edgerton, Missouri, US
- Died: January 30, 2000 (aged 86); Los Angeles, California, US
- Other name: Margie Hart
- Occupation: Burlesque performer
- Spouse: John Ferraro

Margaret Hart Ferraro (September 28, 1913 – January 30, 2000), better known as Margie Hart, was a New York City stripteaser, in American burlesque theatre.

== Biography ==
Hart was born Margaret Bridget Bryan on September 28, 1913, in Edgerton, Missouri, one of eight children. She left home aged 16, then studied "exotic dancing" once she was of age in St. Louis. She married John Ferraro, the Los Angeles City Council president, in 1982. Hart suffered an aneurysm and a stroke not long after their marriage. In the 1990s her health declined quickly until she died at 86 years old in Los Angeles on January 30, 2000.

== Trial for indecency ==
Hart was one of three burlesque dancers who performed at Minsky's Burlesque arrested in April 1935 for giving an indecent performance. Hart, 21, who resided at the Hotel Forrest in Manhattan, New York, was taken into custody along with Toots Brawner, 22, of the Dixie Hotel, and Gladys McCormick, 24, of 229 West 49th Street. The three pleaded not guilty and were each held on $500 bail. Jack Keller, 22, of Thayer Street, and Edward Goodman, 27, of 209 West 42nd Street (Manhattan) were arrested along with the dancers. Keller, a stage manager, was charged with permitting an indecent performance. Goodman was assistant manager of the Republic Theatre. The men were held on $500 bail pending a hearing on April 16, 1935.

Hart, Brawner, McCormick, and three other chorus girls were arraigned in West Side Court but were freed by Magistrate Guy Van Amringe, who presided in Commercial Frauds Court, on May 7, 1935. Keller was detained in bail fixed at $500, as was Goodman, pending a trial date. Along with them, Van Amringe ordered detained Edward Rowland, assistant manager of the Gaiety Theatre, 1539 Broadway (Manhattan).

== Burlesque banished ==
Hart's arrest coincided with a 1935 citizen's groups campaign in New York City, calling for action against burlesque. Paul Moss, license commissioner, hoped to revoke Minsky's license. He was unsuccessful when the New York State Court of Appeals ruled he needed a conviction to revoke the club's license. Finally, in April 1937, one of Minsky's dancers was observed performing without a G-string. Moss then acted to shut down Minsky's and its rivals. Following several appeals the Minskys and their burlesque competitors were allowed to reopen, but only if they did not allow strippers to perform. The businesses went along with this, hoping that burlesque might return following the November 1937 election. However, reformist mayor Fiorello LaGuardia, was returned to office, and the Minskys and their rivals were closed again.

In 1942 Isidore Herk and the Shubert brothers co-produced a Broadway show called Wine, Women and Song, starring Jimmy Savo and Margie Hart. The show was advertised as a combination of vaudeville, burlesque and Broadway revue, and ran for seven weeks. The revue included striptease, which shocked some of the audiences. Wine, Women and Song was closed by court order in December 1942.
