= Joel Wachs =

American lawyer and politician

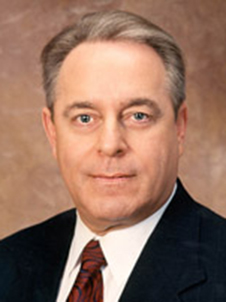
- Official portrait, 2000

President of the Los Angeles City Council
- In office July 1, 1981 – June 30, 1983
- Preceded by: John Ferraro
- Succeeded by: Pat Russell

Member of the Los Angeles City Council from the 2nd district
- In office July 1, 1971 – October 1, 2001
- Preceded by: James B. Potter Jr.
- Succeeded by: Wendy Greuel

President Pro Tempore of the Los Angeles City Council
- In office July 1, 1995 – June 30, 1999
- Preceded by: Marvin Braude
- Succeeded by: Ruth Galanter
- In office July 1, 1977 – June 30, 1981
- Preceded by: John Ferraro
- Succeeded by: Peggy Stevenson

Personal details
- Born: March 1, 1939 (age 87) Scranton, Pennsylvania, U.S.
- Party: Republican (until 1993); Independent (1993–present)
- Education: University of California, Los Angeles (BA); Harvard University (JD); New York University (LLM)

Joel Wachs (/ˈwæks/, wax; born March 1, 1939) is an American former politician and lawyer. He is the president of the Andy Warhol Foundation for the Visual Arts in New York City. He was a member of the Los Angeles City Council for 30 years, where he was known for his promotion of the arts, support of gay causes, advocacy of rent control and other economic measures.

The unmarried Wachs was a closeted gay man until he was preparing to run for mayor in 1999 at the age of 60. He was asked by Bill Rosendahl, the openly gay moderator of a public affairs television show, "Are you a gay man?" Wachs responded: "I am and I'm very proud of what I've done for the community, and I'm also very proud of the fact that what I've done for the community is what I've done for all communities."

== Early life and education ==
Wachs was born on March 1, 1939, in Scranton, Pennsylvania, the son of Hannah (Stahler) and Archie Wachs, a teacher. His father was a Jewish immigrant from Poland who ran a grocery and butcher shop. The younger of two sons, Joel "suffered from hay fever so severe that at the height of the ragweed season, his parents sat him in the shop's cold storage room, in a fur coat, to help him breathe". They moved to Los Angeles when Wachs was ten, where his family became wealthy with a chain of inexpensive ladies' clothing stores. He grew up in Vermont Knolls, between 79th and 83rd streets and Vermont and Normandie Avenue.

He attended Horace Mann Junior High School and Washington High School, followed by the University of California, Los Angeles, where the "gregarious" Wachs was president of his freshman and junior classes, and of the student body. He earned a degree at Harvard Law School and a Master of Laws in taxation from New York University. When in Los Angeles, he lived in Studio City.

== Career ==
After completing his education, Wachs was an attorney with the Los Angeles firm of Gray, Binkley & Pfaelzer (later became Kadison, Pfaelzer, Woodard & Quinn) and practiced law for five years. He told a reporter in 1991, "I didn't love practicing tax law ... the result of my efforts was finding ways to save rich people money. And I didn't find that satisfying."

=== Los Angeles City Council ===
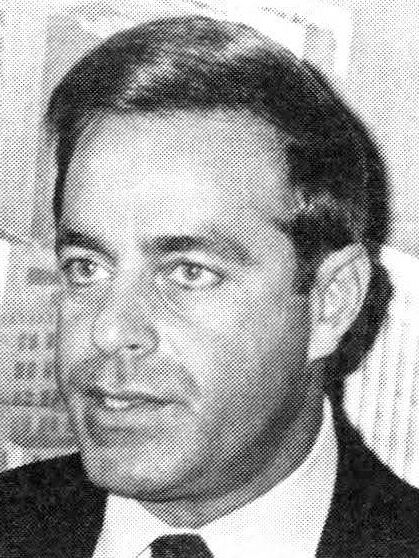
Wachs in 1986 while serving in the Los Angeles City Council.

Wachs served on the Los Angeles City Council from July 1, 1971, to September 28, 2001, when his resignation took effect. His 30 years on the council were surpassed only by John Ferraro's 35 years, Ernani Bernardi's 32 years and Marvin Braude's 31.

==== Elections ====
In May 1971, Wachs, "a young political newcomer," "overwhelmed" veteran James B. Potter, Jr. in Los Angeles City Council District 2, which included portions of the Santa Monica Mountains and the San Fernando Valley. The vote was 24,704 for Wachs and 14,898 for Potter. His victory was attributed in part to his opposing a multimillion-dollar development in the mountains just north of Beverly Hills.

At 33, he became the City Council's youngest member.

In 1986, a redistricting move stripped Wachs of more than 90% of his old district, and put him into a new one that ran from his home in Studio City to Sunland-Tujunga in the far northeast San Fernando Valley. He was nevertheless easily reelected in April 1987 in the realigned, more conservative district, despite the opposition of the Los Angeles Apartment Owners Association, which attacked him because of his fight for rent control. Wachs was reelected in every vote thereafter.

==== Presidency ====
After ten years on the City Council, two of them as president pro-tem, Wachs was suddenly and unexpectedly elected Los Angeles City Council president in July 1981 when outgoing President John Ferraro decided to drop out of the contest against Councilwoman Pat Russell and, with Councilwoman Peggy Stevenson as a partner, put up Wachs as a candidate instead. Wachs was elected to a two-year term in an 8–7 vote, with Wachs breaking a pledge to Russell to vote for her and casting a vote for himself instead. He later described the turn of events as akin to a "Hollywood movie" and, inasmuch as Mayor Tom Bradley was soon to become a candidate for governor, he had plenty of opportunity to act as mayor when Bradley was out of town. He served for two years.

=== Resignation ===
Wachs resigned from the City Council in 2001 to accept the presidency of the Andy Warhol Foundation for the Visual Arts. His last day on the City Council was September 28 of that year.

=== Mayoral candidacies ===
Wachs thrice ran for mayor of Los Angeles. In 1973, as a relatively unknown new city council member, he finished a distant fifth in a crowded primary in an election in which Tom Bradley eventually won his first term as Los Angeles mayor.

In 1993, he finished third behind Richard Riordan and Mike Woo.

He ran again in 2001 and finished fourth with 11% of the vote, behind James K. Hahn, Antonio Villaraigosa and Steve Soboroff.

=== Involvement in the arts ===
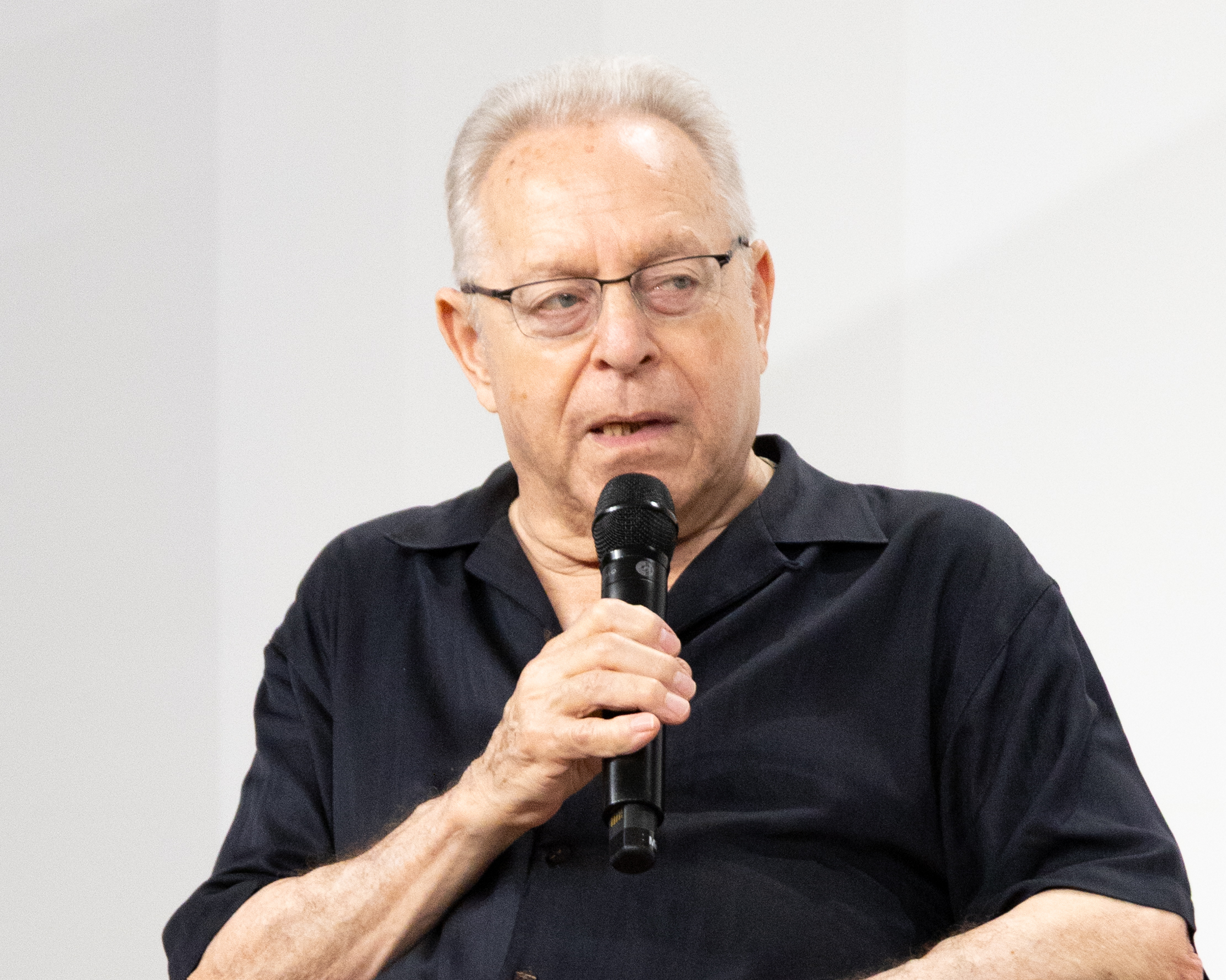
Wachs speaking at Art Basel in 2025.

In 1977, Wachs was appointed vice chairman of a new National Task Force on the Arts, whose goal, he said, was "to put the arts and culture on the agenda of every city government as a mainstream economic and social concern". In a 1981 interview, he said he spent one-third of his $43,923 annual salary (equivalent to between $127,906 and $155,547 in 2025) on works of art for himself and that, when the time came to leave the City Council, he could be happy practicing law, "being a maitre d' in a nice restaurant," or "heading an arts foundation". In 1987 he flew to New York City to be a part of a seven-member panel that tried to determine what to do with a 12-foot-high, 112-foot-long outdoor steel sculpture by Richard Serra titled "Tilted Arc," which had drawn complaints and was eventually disassembled, removed, and put in storage.

He was the author of an ordinance that requires commercial developers to set aside 1% of the value of all projects over $500,000 for cultural and artistic projects—either spending the money on their own, or depositing it with the city for such use.

Wachs was active in strengthening Los Angeles' ordinance on outdoor advertising signs but was equally active when the city's Building and Safety Commission at first attempted to classify a proposed work by Barbara Kruger as a sign that fell under its jurisdiction. It later reversed itself and Wachs specifically compared the commission's initial decision to the prosecution of a Cincinnati museum over a show by photographer Robert Mapplethorpe.

=== Andy Warhol Foundation ===
In 2001, Wachs resigned his council seat and moved to New York City in order to serve as president of the Andy Warhol Foundation for the Visual Arts. Wachs is nominally the chairman of the Andy Warhol Art Authentication Board. Wachs's salary at the charity is over $715,788 per year, which does not include generous expenses and a pension plan of approximately 20%. Although this is nearly four times the average salary for such a position, some have argued that the Warhol Foundation is unusually complex as well as being more influential than most similar organizations.

In 2010, Wachs—in his Warhol Foundation role—protested the removal of a David Wojnarowicz piece from the "Hide/Seek" exhibit at the National Portrait Gallery. The foundation had supported the exhibition with a $100,000 grant. Wachs wrote to the head of the Smithsonian Institution (NPG's parent organization), G. Wayne Clough, on behalf of the foundation's unanimous board with the "demand that the Smithsonian restore the work ... to the exhibition or the foundation would reject any future grant requests". Wachs' letter said in part, "For the arts to flourish, the arts must be free, and the decision to censor this important work is in stark opposition to our mission to defend freedom of expression wherever and whenever it is under attack." There were no signs of reinstatement of the Wojnarowicz piece by the NPG.

== Political positions ==
"Wachs defied easy categorization on the council, emerging as a populist who railed against what he saw as insider dealing in City Hall and misuse of taxpayer funds. He also was a staunch advocate for the arts and for civil rights." He was known as a "moderate to liberal Republican" but reregistered as an independent before running for mayor in 1993. He backed efforts that resulted in public financing of city elections and creation of an ethics commission.

=== Neighborhood councils ===
Wachs is sometimes cited as the originator of neighborhood councils in Los Angeles. He organized the first ones—in Studio City, Sherman Oaks, North Hollywood-Toluca Lake and the hill area south of Mulholland Drive in November 1971, choosing the first members himself from a range of backgrounds. He launched numerous studies of such councils in other cities and produced a booklet to help guide the new representative community groups in Los Angeles.

=== Oil drilling ===
In 1971, he proposed a ban on oil drilling on the city's coastline one-half mile inland from the shore "for both esthetic and geographical safety reasons".

=== Income tax ===
He was a supporter of levying a city income tax in order to relieve property owners of a tax burden.

=== Rent control ===
He was a decided advocate for rent control in an effort to keep housing affordable for the elderly and the poor.

=== Gay rights ===
Wachs and Councilwoman Peggy Stevenson sponsored what Wachs called "the strongest gay rights ordinance in the U.S.," prohibiting job and housing discrimination based on sexual orientation. His measure outlawing employment discrimination against victims of AIDS was passed unanimously by the City Council, despite the fact that his mail on the subject was running heavily against it.

=== Recycling ===
In 1981, Wachs called for mandatory separation of recyclable materials from regular trash before collection to cope with the city's "growing refuse-disposal crisis".

=== Artists ===
Wachs successfully advocated for an ordinance change that would allow artists to live and work in commercially zoned districts. He also worked to create a city Cultural Affairs Department.

=== Drug gear ===
Wachs cast the only vote against a city ordinance prohibiting minors from purchasing drug paraphernalia, saying in 1983 he did not think police officers should spend their time raiding head shops.

=== Dog leashing ===
He proposed an eventually successful idea for the city to provide a number of dog parks, where Los Angeles' nearly 200,000 licensed dogs could run free.

=== Law enforcement ===
Wachs emerged as the sole City Council member who helped broker an agreement that enabled Police Chief Daryl Gates to resign his post in June 1992 and retire "in an orderly fashion" after a crisis occasioned by the March 1991 beating of Rodney King and the resulting riots—as well as the issuance of a final, critical report of the police department by the Christopher Commission. Wachs and Gates forged a bond of trust, it was said, when the councilman leaped to the chief's defense after the city Police Commission briefly removed Gates in the wake of the riots.

=== Dan White ===
Wachs went to Sacramento in January 1984 to unsuccessfully argue with state prison authorities that Dan White, the San Francisco supervisor who had killed gay leader Harvey Milk and Mayor George Moscone, should be moved out of Los Angeles County, where he had been paroled after serving five years in prison for the killings.

=== Sports arena ===
Wachs was credited with forging a 1997 deal with the developers of a downtown sports arena that lifted some of the onerous provisions that would have worked to the financial disadvantage of the city. In return for the concessions, he agreed to exempt the arena from a ballot measure he was preparing to require voter approval for any subsidized sports stadiums.

=== Slow-growth development ===
Wachs was an advocate for slow-growth development and was one of the cowriters of Proposition U, along with Zev Yaroslavsky and Marvin Braude.

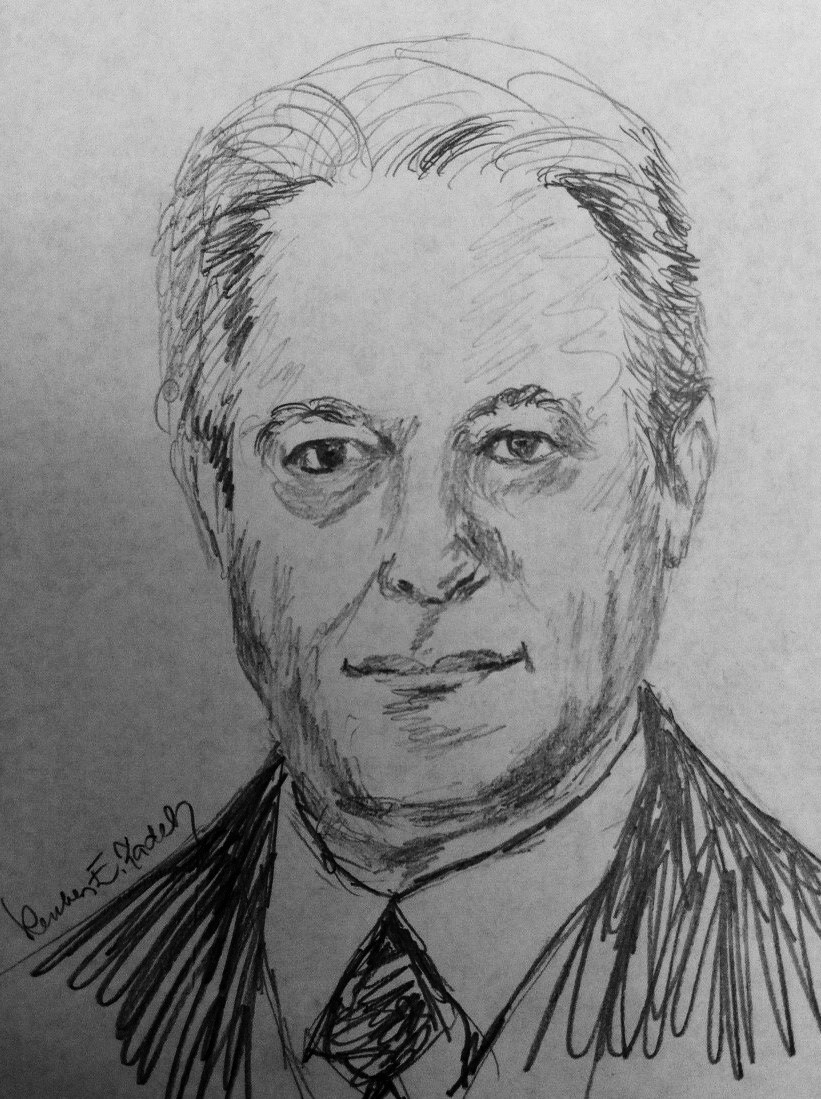
Sketch of Wachs in 1998.

== Personal life ==
Wachs was known for his boisterous personality. When he was newly elected to the Los Angeles City Council, he distributed a mock ordinance that would supposedly have taxed all male residents on the size of their genitals. Occasionally he exclaimed "This is fun!" in the middle of a committee meeting. His colleagues described him as "a human guy, a lot of heart".

In recognition of Wachs' involvement in promoting the arts, the City Council in 2002 named the intersection of Grand Avenue and Second Street as "Joel Wachs Square". It lies between the Museum of Contemporary Art and the Walt Disney Concert Hall.

== In popular media ==
Wachs is portrayed by Benny Safdie in the film Licorice Pizza set in 1970s San Fernando Valley. In the film, Wachs's first mayoral campaign is a plot point.
