= Ed Reyes =

American politician

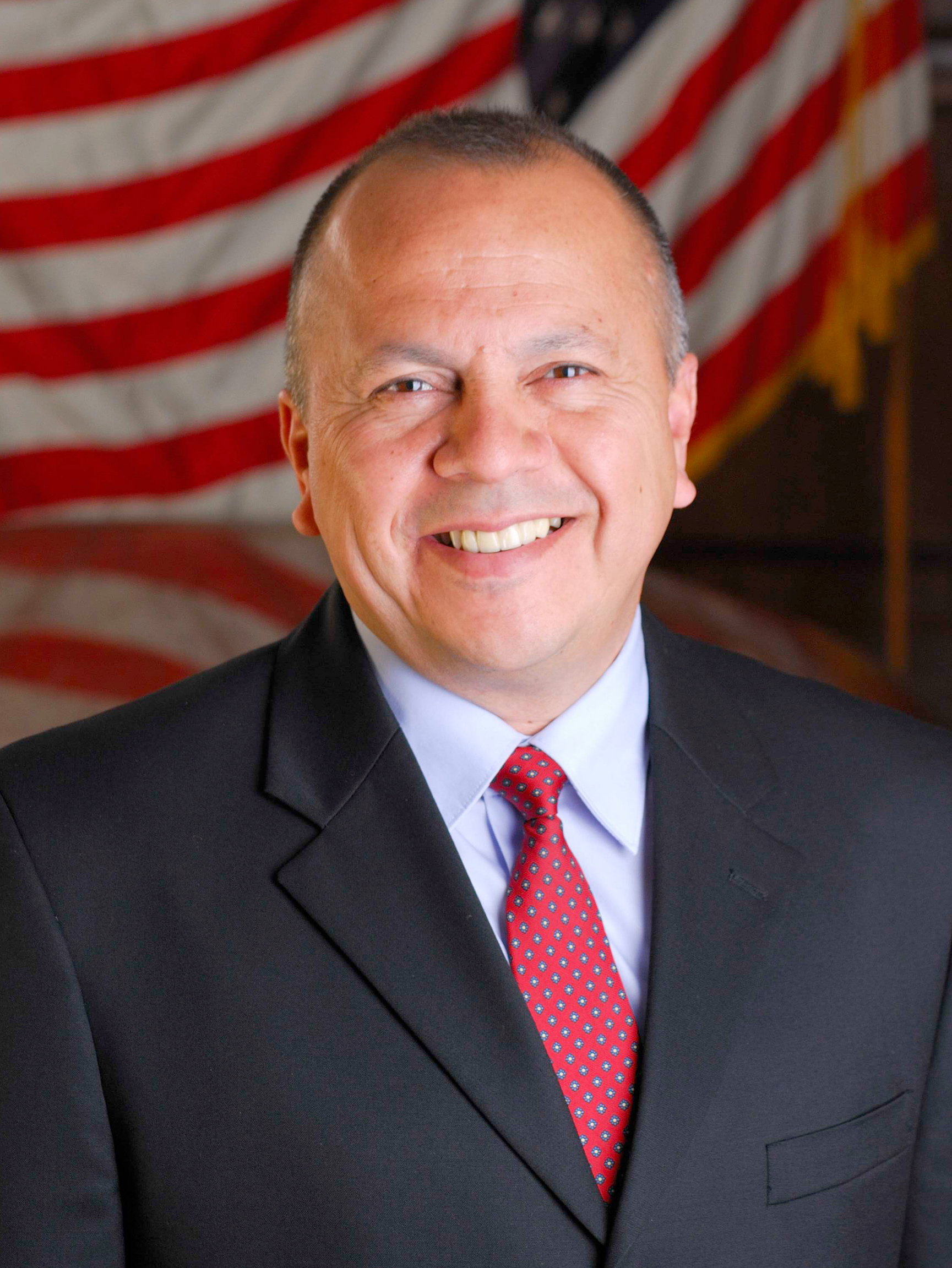
- Official portrait, 2007

Member of the Los Angeles City Council from the 1st district
- In office July 1, 2001 – July 1, 2013
- Preceded by: Mike Hernández
- Succeeded by: Gil Cedillo

President pro tempore of the Los Angeles City Council
- In office January 2, 2012 – July 1, 2013
- Preceded by: Jan Perry
- Succeeded by: Mitchell Englander

Personal details
- Born: January 11, 1959 (age 67) Los Angeles, California, U.S.
- Party: Democratic
- Spouse: Martha Reyes
- Education: University of California, Los Angeles

Eduardo Perez Reyes (born January 11, 1959) is an American politician. He was a member of the Los Angeles City Council, representing the 1st district. Reyes was re-elected in 2005 to serve a second Council term, capturing 78 percent of the votes. He is a member of the Democratic Party. He has a background in urban planning.

== Career ==
In response to safety concerns, Reyes, vice-chair of the Public Safety Committee, has secured funds for added Los Angeles Police Department units and technology, graffiti and neighborhood clean-ups, gang prevention programs and safe route school maps. In September 2008, Reyes opened the new Rampart Division police station, one of the nation's busiest police stations, and the city's "greenest" police station because of its LEED Gold-rated designation.

In October 2002, and shortly after William Bratton became the city's top cop, Reyes brought the Los Angeles Police Department Police Chief to MacArthur Park to witness firsthand the drug deals, gang activity and shootings there. That tour resulted in a nationally recognized LAPD effort - consisting of surveillance cameras and boosted patrols—that transformed one of the city's most blighted parks into a popular spot for family picnics, festivals and concerts. Crime at MacArthur Park has dropped 20 percent since Reyes launched the crime-fighting project, a joint effort with the community, local businesses and LAPD.

Earlier in his tenure, Reyes also launched a nationally renowned lead abatement program to protect children from the dangers of lead-based paint found in pre-1979 housing. He spearheaded the $160 million Northeast Interceptor Sewer tunnel to prevent sewage overflow and protect the health of families and children.

As Chair of the City Council's Planning and Land Use Management committee, Reyes has expanded the city's affordable housing stock. He has pushed for Adaptive Reuse, or the conversion of abandoned buildings into housing, and Residential and Accessory Services, which permits residential development in commercial zones. And he has spearheaded efforts to strengthen the city's rent control ordinance. As chair of the Metro Gold Line Authority he also helped ensure that the $750 million Gold Line project be completed on time and on budget.

Reyes has opened four new libraries in Cypress Park, Chinatown, Highland Park and Pico-Union and has added more than 80 acres (320,000 m^{2}) of new park space to his district. As chair of the Los Angeles River Ad Hoc Committee, he has brought a renewed focus to the once-ignored Los Angeles River and secured more than $3 million to create a neighborhood-driven plan that will include enhancing water quality, environmental protection, increasing open space and improving flood control.

Reyes attended University of California, Los Angeles where he earned a bachelor's degree in English and a master's degree from UCLA's Graduate School of Architecture and Urban Planning. He lives in the northeast Los Angeles community of Mt. Washington with his wife Martha and their four children.

Political offices
Preceded by Mike Hernández	Los Angeles City Councilmember, 1st district July 1, 2001 – July 1, 2013	Succeeded by Gil Cedillo
Preceded by Jan Perry	President Pro Tempore of the Los Angeles City Council; January 2, 2012 – July 1, 2013	Succeeded by Mitchell Englander
