= Westchester, Los Angeles =

Neighborhood of Los Angeles, California, United States

Westchester
- Neighborhood of Los Angeles
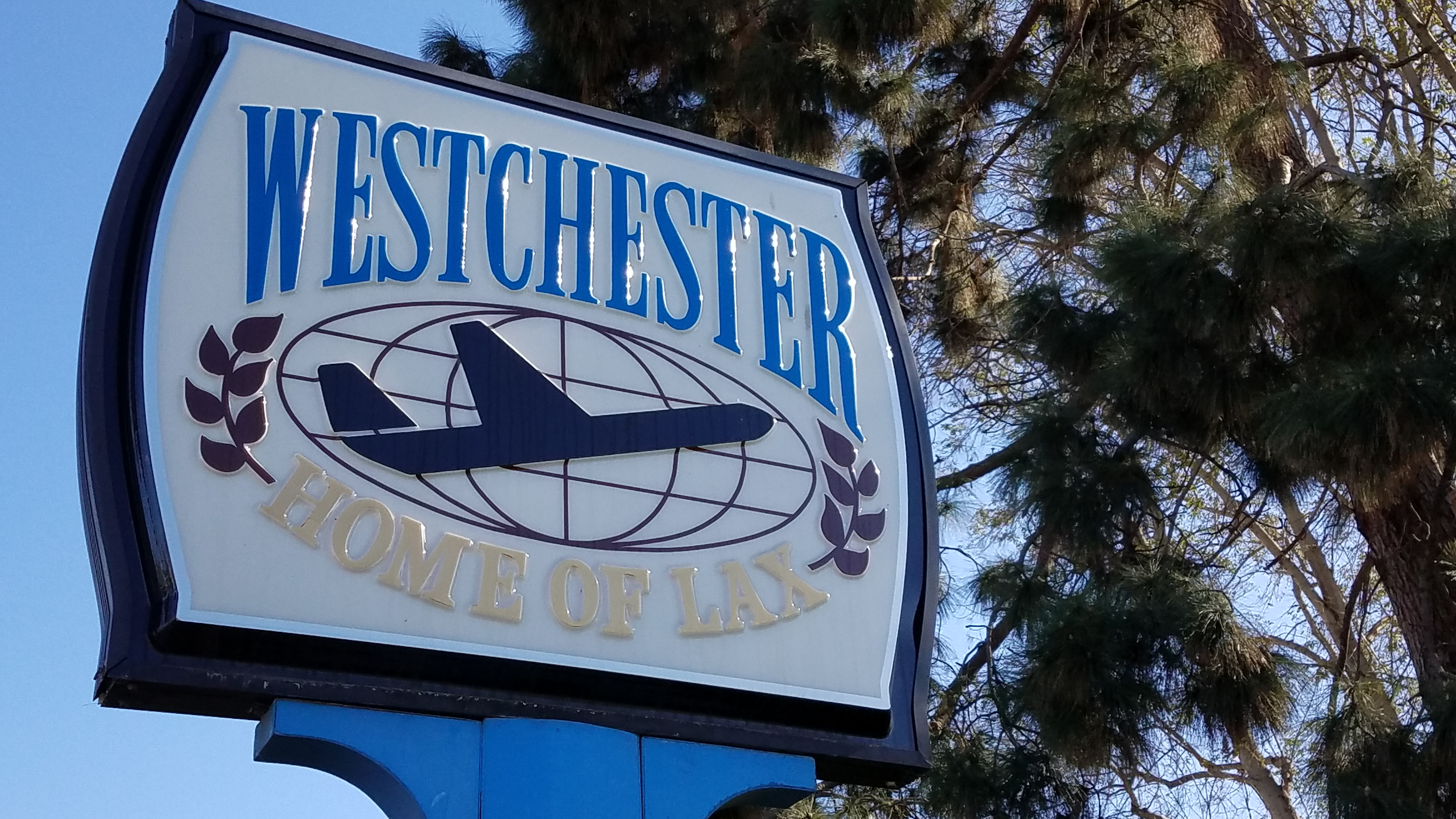
- "Westchester, Home of LAX" sign at Westchester Rec Center

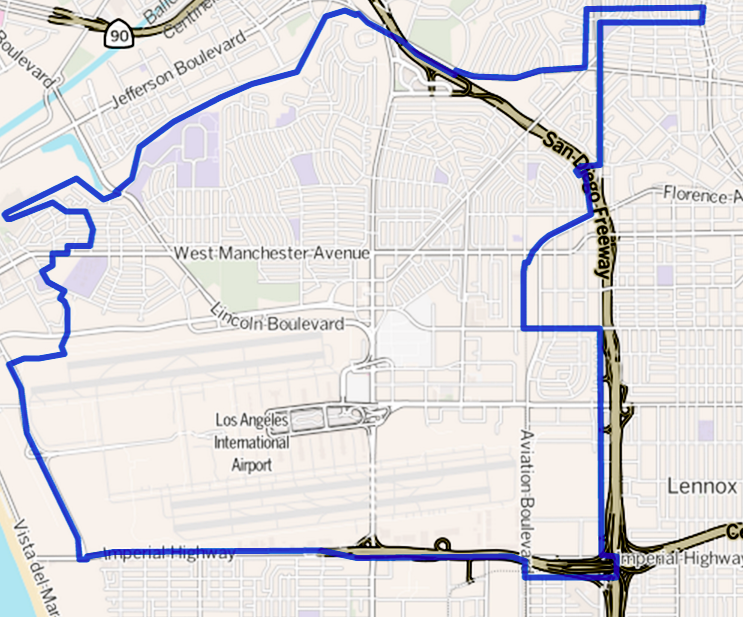
- Westchester as outlined by the Los Angeles Times

- Location within Western Los Angeles
- Coordinates: 33.95972°N 118.39972°W
- Country: United States

Westchester is a neighborhood in the City of Los Angeles, California, United States.

It is home to Los Angeles International Airport, Loyola Marymount University, Otis College of Art and Design, and Westchester Enriched Sciences Magnet Schools (formerly Westchester High School).

== Geography ==
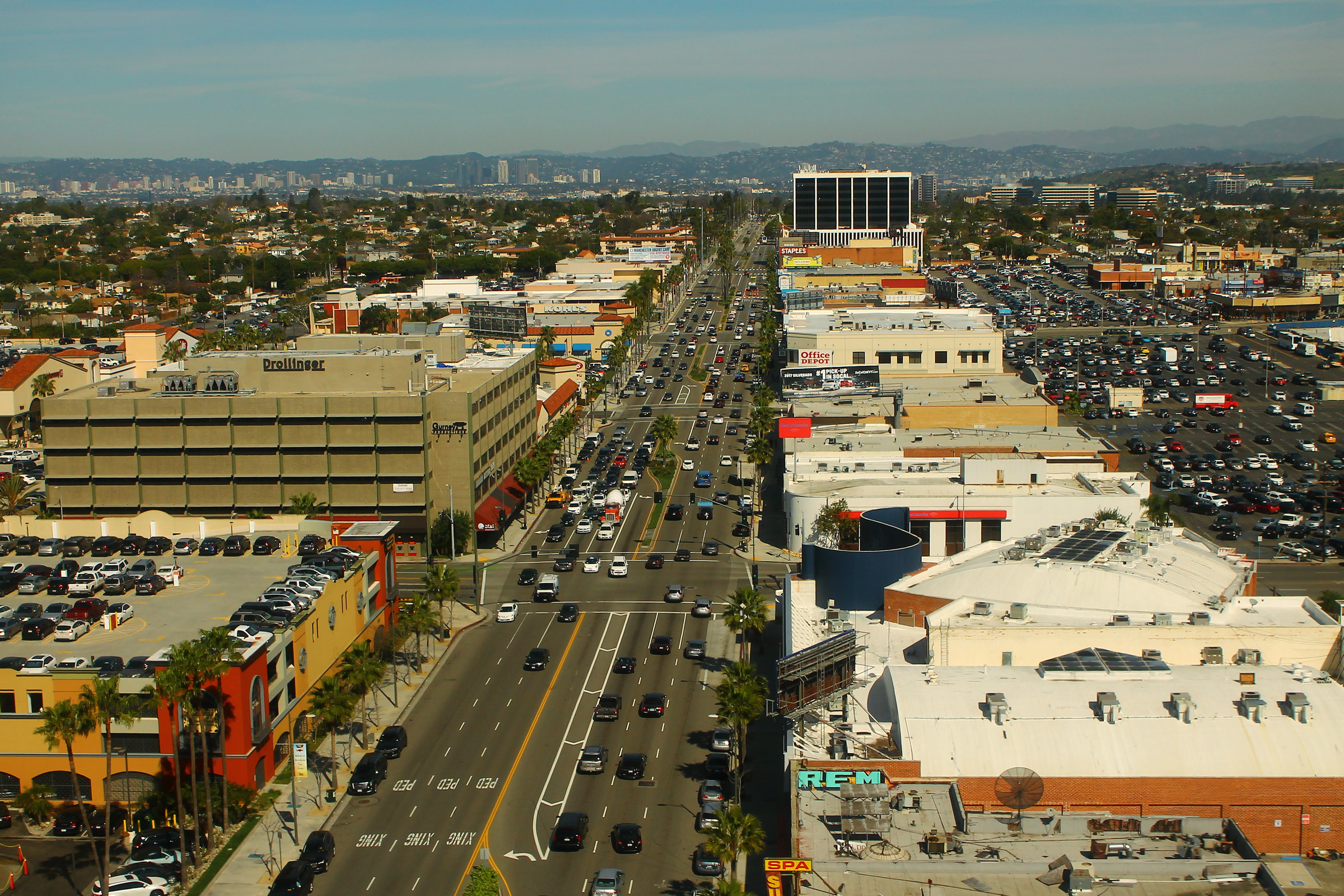
Sepulveda Boulevard through downtown Westchester, as viewed from LAX

The main part of Westchester is bordered by Playa Vista and Culver City on the north, Inglewood and Lennox on the east, Hawthorne on the southeast, Del Aire and El Segundo on the south and Playa del Rey on the west. It includes all of the Los Angeles International Airport. There is also a two-block-wide shoestring district that runs from the intersection of Centinela Avenue and La Cienega Boulevard north to 63rd Street and then east to Overhill Avenue, where it links with the Hyde Park neighborhood.

The main neighborhood's boundary lines are, generally, on the east: north-south on La Cienega Boulevard or the Inglewood city line; on the south: east-west on the city boundary with El Segundo or Imperial Highway; on the west: north-south on Pershing Drive and Westchester Parkway, then roughly north-south on a series of residential streets west of Westchester High School to the Playa Vista neighborhood.

== History ==
Westchester began the 20th century as an agricultural area, growing a wide variety of crops in the dry, farming-friendly climate. The rapid development of the aerospace industry near Mines Field (as the Los Angeles Airport was then known), the move of then Loyola University to the area in 1928, and population growth in Los Angeles as a whole created a demand for housing in the area. Westchester was built with the intention of housing members of the working class. Westchester hosted the cross country part of the eventing equestrian event for the 1932 Summer Olympics in Los Angeles.

In the late 1930s, real estate magnate Fritz Burns and his partner Fred W. Marlow developed a tract of inexpensive prefabricated single-family homes on the site of a former hog farm at the intersection of Manchester and Sepulveda Boulevards. This community, dubbed "Westchester", grew as the aerospace industry boomed in World War II and afterward. A Los Angeles Times article in 1989 described the development as "a raw suburb", "created willy-nilly in the 1940s".

The area was predominantly residential. When the area had 30,000 residents, it was still lacking a police station, fire station, or hospital. It lacked a barber shop even by 1949.

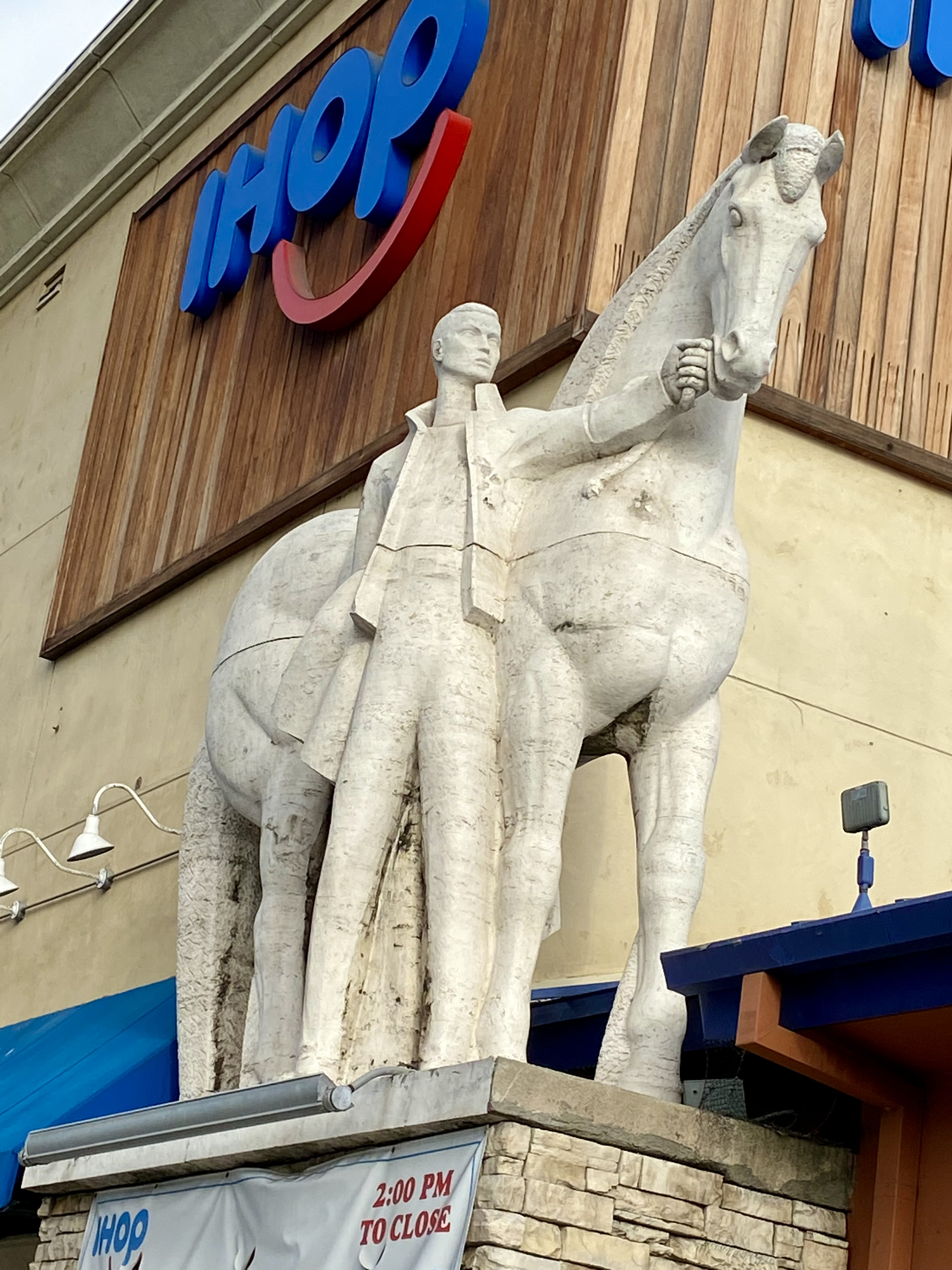
Imperial Bank horse sculpture (1975) by Millard Sheets, located at Manchester and Sepulveda

The 1960s saw the introduction of airliners that could make trans-Pacific flights without refueling, causing a massive increase in air traffic at LAX. When the North Airfield Complex was constructed the increase in noise from jet takeoffs greatly decreased the desirability of the residential areas adjoining LAX. In response, the city of Los Angeles began a program of purchasing and condemning houses from noise-weary homeowners; as a result, a number of streets just north of the airport have been decommissioned, and the homes along those streets demolished. In all, Westchester lost 4,500 homes and 14,000 residents. The 18-hole Westchester golf course became a 15-hole course. In 2007 Los Angeles World Airport (LAWA) proposed another move of the north runway into Westchester; local opposition to LAX expansion (first proposed in the late 1990s) rose.

In February 2010, a NASA panel found that the north runway was safe and should stay as it is. That same month, LAWA broke ground on a $1.5 billion expansion of the Bradley International Terminal.

Construction of the LAX Rental Car Center led to further mass demolitions of residential structures. The former Manchester Square neighborhood, a 120-acre tract spanning from Aviation to La Cienega and Arbor Vitae to Century, was acquired and demolished piecemeal beginning in 1999. A densely built-up area consisting of a mix of apartment complexes, duplexes, single family housing and schools, it had a population of over 7,000 in 1998 before the buyout program began. Because LAWA did not use eminent domain to acquire the area, remaining occupied housing coexisted with an increasing number of fenced-off vacant lots owned by LAWA for many years before the buyouts were completed. By 2004 nearly half the population had left, but the final buyouts and demolitions would not occur for nearly 15 years. In its final years, the remaining residents between the derelict properties were plagued with vandalism, illegal dumping, and an enormous homeless encampment with over 800 residents. In 2017 courts authorized the use of eminent domain to acquire the remaining parcels and the last owners all agreed to sell voluntarily shortly afterward. Combined with the 1970's expansion, this brought the total number of Westchester residents displaced by LAX construction to well over 20,000.

Home prices rose 25 percent in 2013–14 while most southern California communities were recovering much more slowly. A major factor has been the influx of technology companies (including Hulu, Google, and Snap, Inc.) in Playa Vista as the Silicon Beach phenomenon in west Los Angeles has spread. The community also experienced a boom in home additions or complete rehabilitation of traditional postwar ranch-style houses into larger two-story homes. The Howard Hughes Center was a significant addition to the neighborhood in 2001 next to the San Diego Freeway. Development continued until by 2015 the complex had 1.3 million square feet of office space (120,000 square metres) in high-rise buildings, 3,200 apartments, and an updated, renovated shopping mall.

Since 2013, The cost of living in Westchester has continued to increase. In April 2017, the median sales price for single-family homes in April was $1.21 million - a 27% increase from a year prior.

== Population ==
A total of 39,480 people lived in Westchester's 10.81 square miles, according to the 2010 U.S. census, and that figure included the uninhabited acreage of the Los Angeles International Airport—resulting in a density of 3,652 people per square mile, among the lowest population densities in the city of Los Angeles but about average for the county. The median age was 35.6, about average for Los Angeles city. The percentage of people from age 19 through 34 was among the county's highest.

In 2010 Non-Hispanic whites made up 61.1% of the population, Blacks 14.2%, Asians 12.0%, Native Hawaiian and other Pacific Islanders 0.3%, and others (including two or more races) at 11.9%. Those who identified themselves as Hispanic or Latino (of any race) were 18.2%.

In 2010, the mean family income for the area was $135,026 and the median family income was $106,302, both numbers high for the city. The percentage of families that earned more than $100,000 a year was 53.5%. Renters occupied 48.2% of the housing units, and homeowners occupied the rest. The average household size was 2.3 people, considered low for the city and county. The percentages of divorced men (8.6%) and divorced women (11.9%) were among the county's highest.

The 2000 census counted 3,055 military veterans, 9.2% of the population, considered a high percentage for the city of Los Angeles but about average for the county.

German and Irish were the most common ancestries according to the 2000 census. Mexico and the Philippines were the most common foreign places of birth.

== Government and infrastructure ==
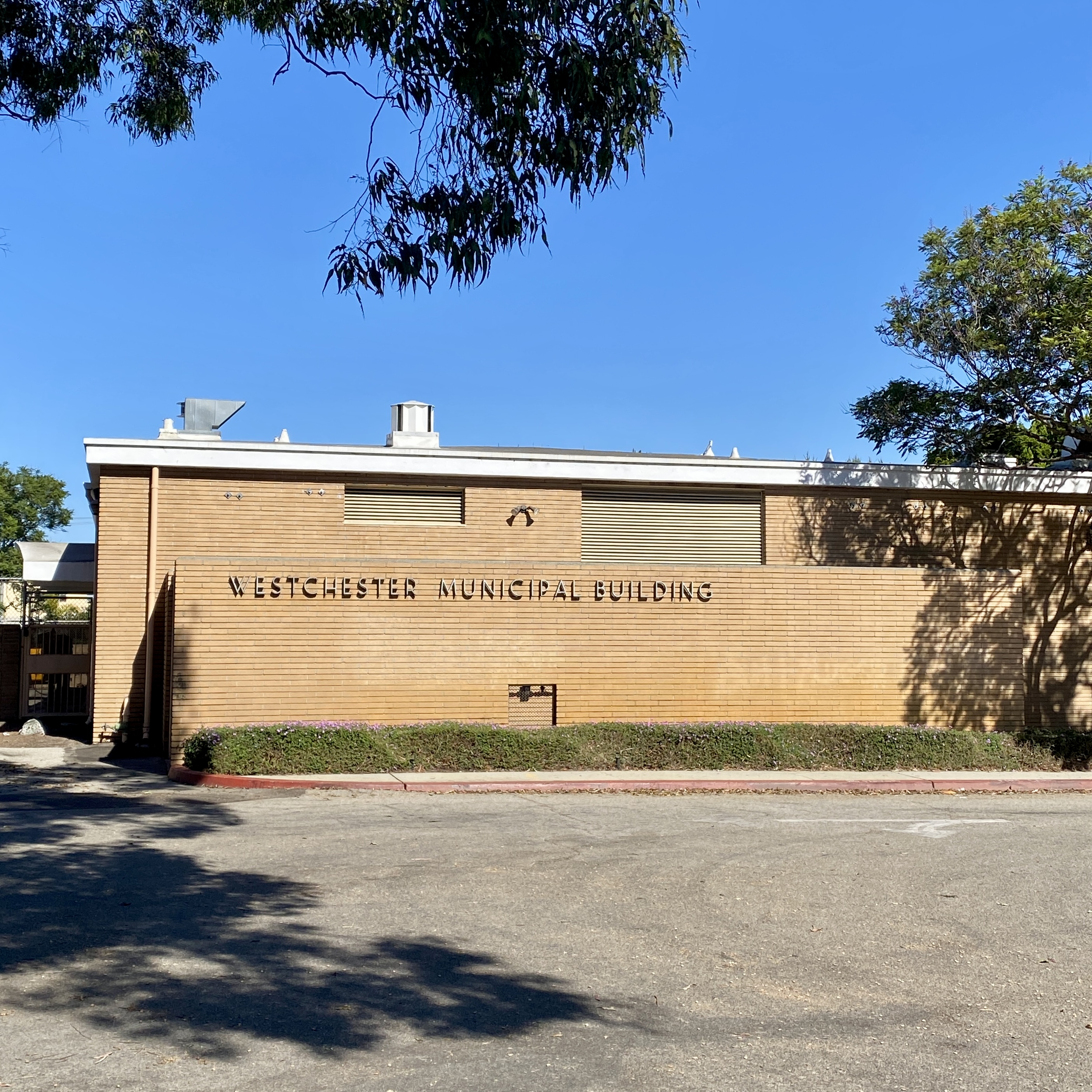
Westchester Municipal Building on Manchester

=== Local government ===
Los Angeles Fire Department Station 5 is in Westchester.

Los Angeles Police Department operates the Pacific Community Police Station at 12312 Culver Boulevard, 90066, serving the neighborhood.

Los Angeles Public Library operates the Westchester-Loyola Village Library, at 7114 W. Manchester Avenue, 90045, as a community library offering free online access, programming and information for all ages.

Los Angeles World Airports has its headquarters on the property of Los Angeles International Airport.

The Los Angeles Bureau of Sanitation operates the West Los Angeles District Refuse Collection Yard, at 2027 Stoner Avenue, 90025, which provides residential refuse collection to Westchester for all residences four units and under.

=== County, federal, and state representation ===
The Los Angeles County Department of Health Services SPA 5 West Area Health Office serves Westchester.

The United States Postal Service Westchester Post Office is located at 7381 La Tijera Boulevard. The United States Postal Service Airport Station is located at 8821 Aviation Boulevard, Los Angeles 90009-9997.

== Education ==
About 51.7% of Westchester's residents had completed a bachelor's degree or higher by 2010, a high figure when compared with the city and the county at large. The percentage of the residents who held a master's degree or a doctorate was also high for the county.

=== Schools ===
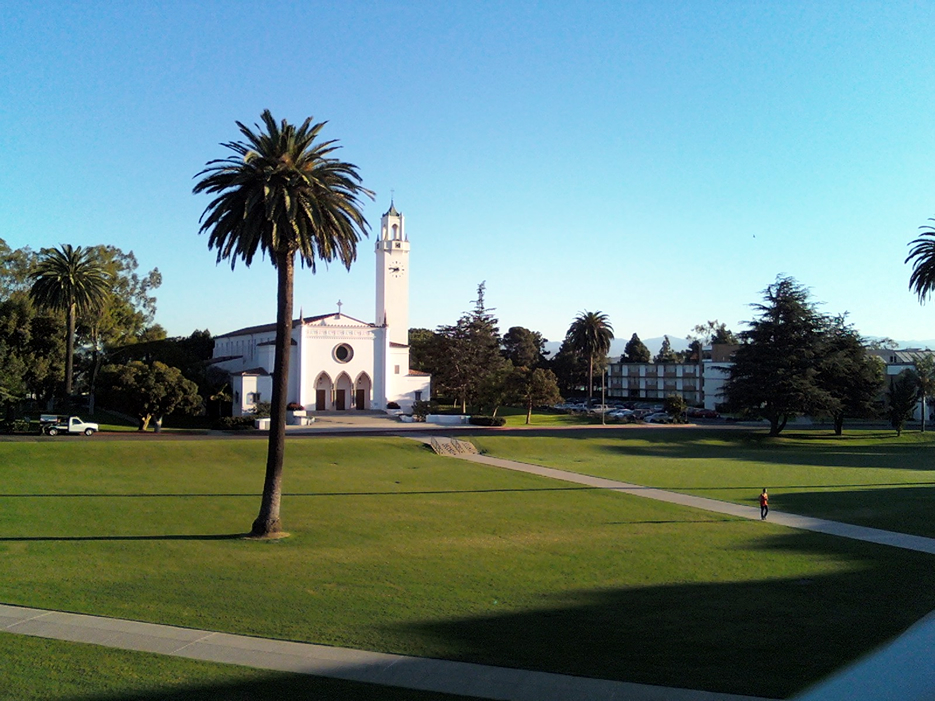
Sunken Gardens at Loyola Marymount University, before 2009

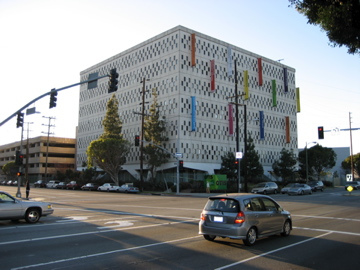
Otis College of Art and Design, before 2009

==== Postsecondary ====
- Loyola Marymount University, 1 LMU Drive
- Otis College of Art and Design, 9045 Lincoln Boulevard
- Pepperdine University West Los Angeles Campus, 6100 Center Drive

==== Secondary and elementary ====
The schools within Westchester's boundaries are:

- Westchester Enriched Sciences Magnet Schools, LAUSD secondary, 7400 West Manchester Avenue
- Permanently closed: The Incubator School, LAUSD, 7400 West Manchester Avenue
- Westchester-Emerson Community Adult School, LAUSD, 8810 Emerson Avenue
- WISH Academy High School 9-12, 7400 W Manchester Ave, Los Angeles, CA 90045 ()
- Bright Star Secondary Charter Academy, 5431 West 98th Street
- Permanently closed: Carousel, private K–12 special education, 7899 La Tijera Boulevard

Middle

- Orville Wright Middle School, 6550 West 80th Street
- Katherine Johnson STEM Academy, 8701 Park Hill Dr. Los Angeles, CA 90045 ()
- WISH Community School 6-8, 7400 W Manchester Ave, Los Angeles, CA 90045 ()

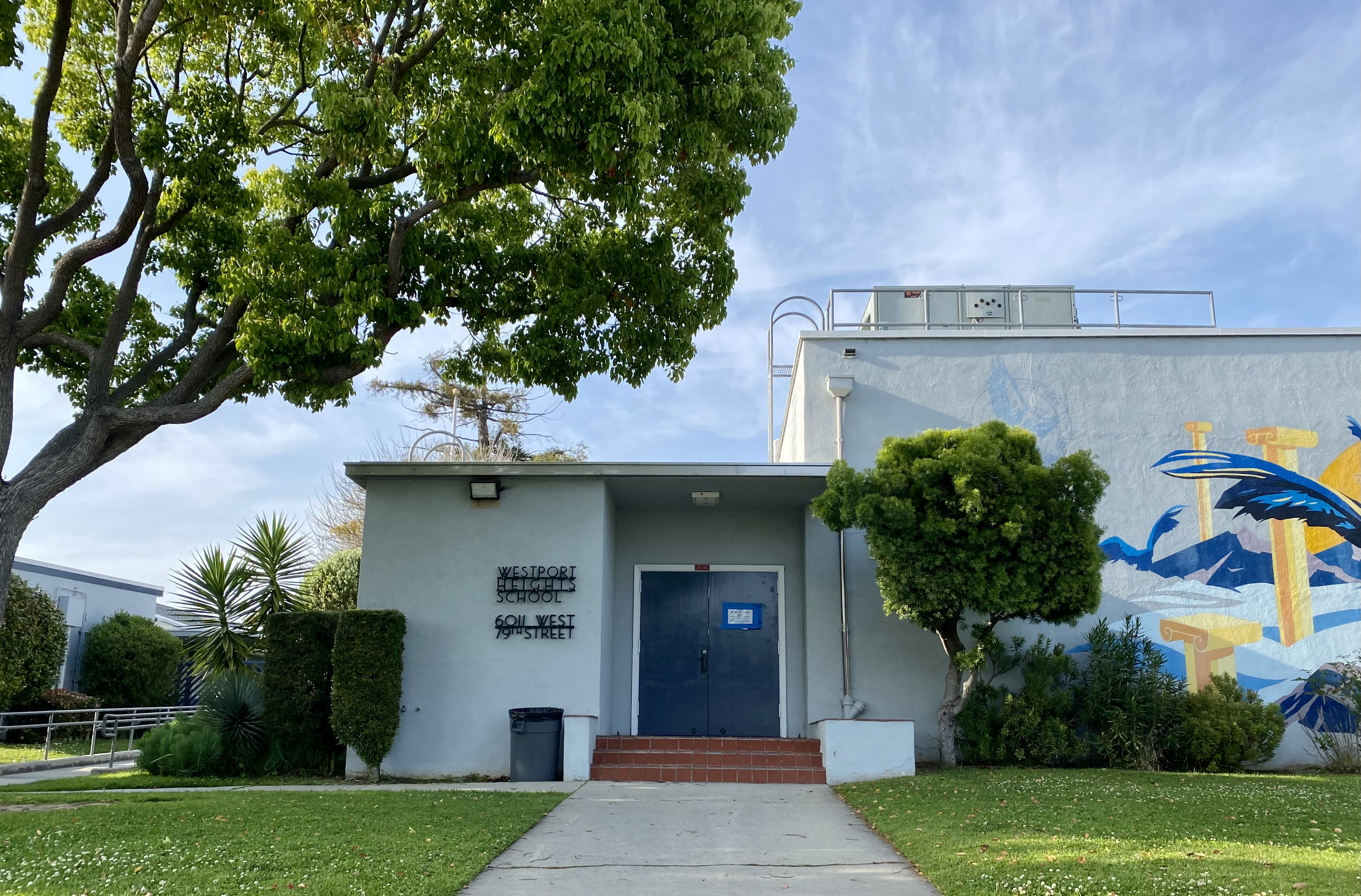
Westport Heights School

Elementary

- Cowan Avenue Elementary School, LAUSD, 7615 Cowan Avenue
- Kentwood Elementary School, LAUSD, 8401 Emerson Avenue
- Loyola Village Elementary School, LAUSD, 8821 Villanova Avenue
- Open Magnet Charter Elementary School, LAUSD, 5540 West 77th Street
- St. Anastasia Elementary School, private, 8631 South Stanmoor Drive
- St. Jerome Elementary School, private, 5580 Thornburn Street
- Visitation Elementary School, private, 8740 South Emerson Avenue
- Westchester Lutheran School, private, 7831 Sepulveda Boulevard
- Westport Heights Elementary School, LAUSD, 6011 West 79th Street
- WISH Charter Elementary School, 6550 W 80th St, Los Angeles, CA 90045 (at Orville Wright Middle School)

As of 2014 the Wiseburn School District allows parents in Westchester to send their children to Wiseburn schools on inter-district transfers.

== Parks and recreation ==
The Westchester Recreation Center is in Westchester. The center includes an auditorium, barbecue pits, a lighted baseball diamond, lighted outdoor basketball courts, two indoor basketball courts, a children's play area, a community room, a lighted football field, an indoor gymnasium without weights, picnic tables, a lighted soccer field, and lighted tennis courts. The Westchester Pool, on the recreation center site, is an outdoor heated seasonal pool renovated in 2010. The Westchester Tennis Courts in the recreation center consist of ten lighted courts. A skate park is also located in the recreation center. The Westchester Golf Course is located just east of the recreation center.

The Westchester Senior Citizen Center has a 200-person auditorium, barbecue pits, a 20-person community room, a garden, a kitchen, picnic tables, and a stage. The 8-acre (3.2 ha) Carl E. Nielsen Youth Park is located in Westchester. In 1991, Los Angeles World Airports planned to pave over the park and use the lot as parking spaces and leased space to rental car companies. During that year, LAWA decided to keep the park open.

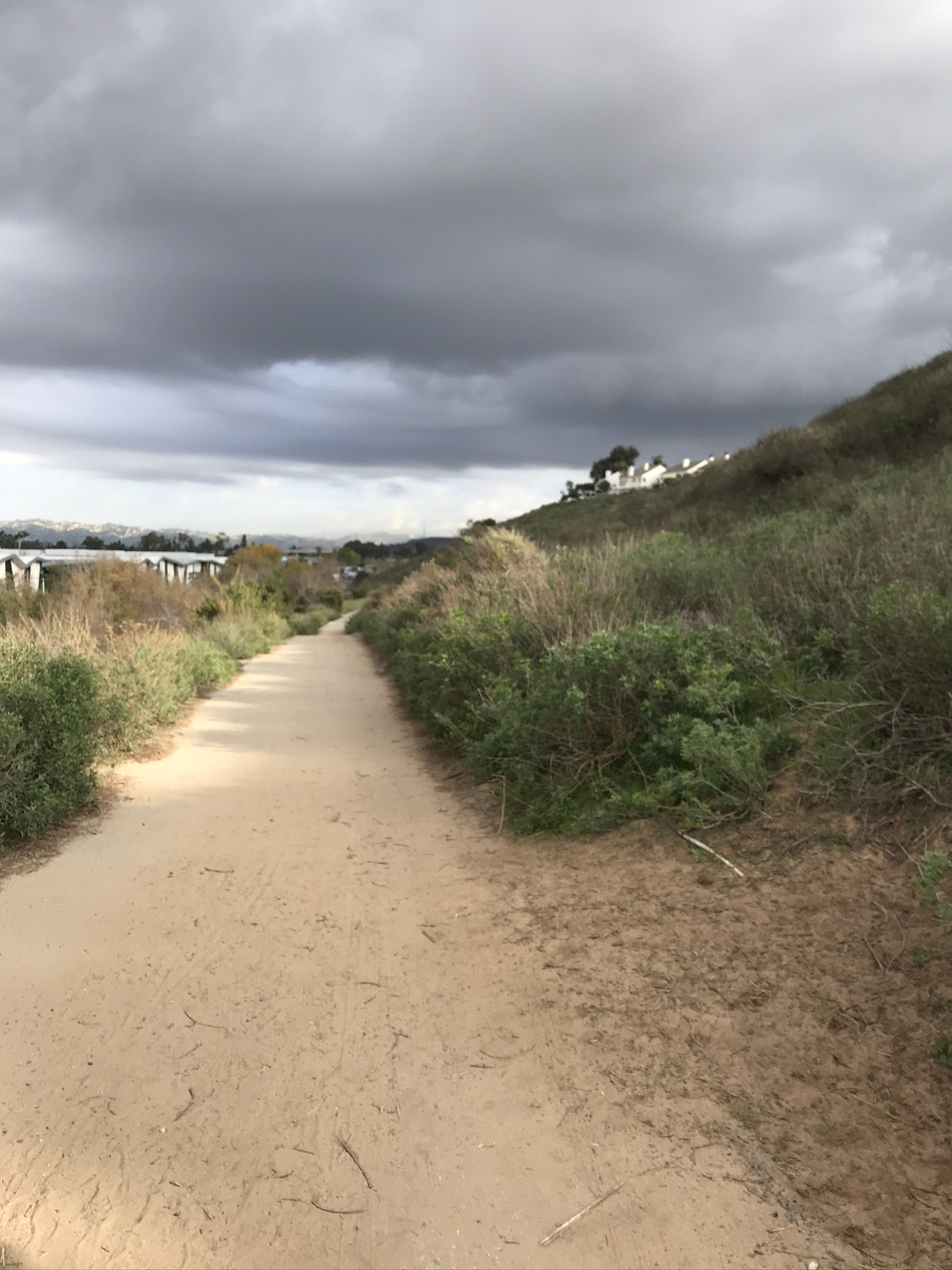
The LMU Fire Road along the Westchester Bluffs above Playa Vista is a popular jogging track.

== Architecture ==
Pann's restaurant, at 6710 La Tijera Boulevard, is "probably the best-preserved example" of the Googie-style architecture developed by Eldon Davis. Pann's includes an angular edifice and large plate-glass windows and has been described as having "the classic coffee shop architecture". Pann's was featured in a story in the Los Angeles Times, "Going on a hunt for Googie architecture", which noted the restaurant's tilted roof and sign, tropical plants and exposed stone walls indoors and out, and glass windows wrapping around the restaurant. Pann's celebrated its 50th anniversary in 2008.

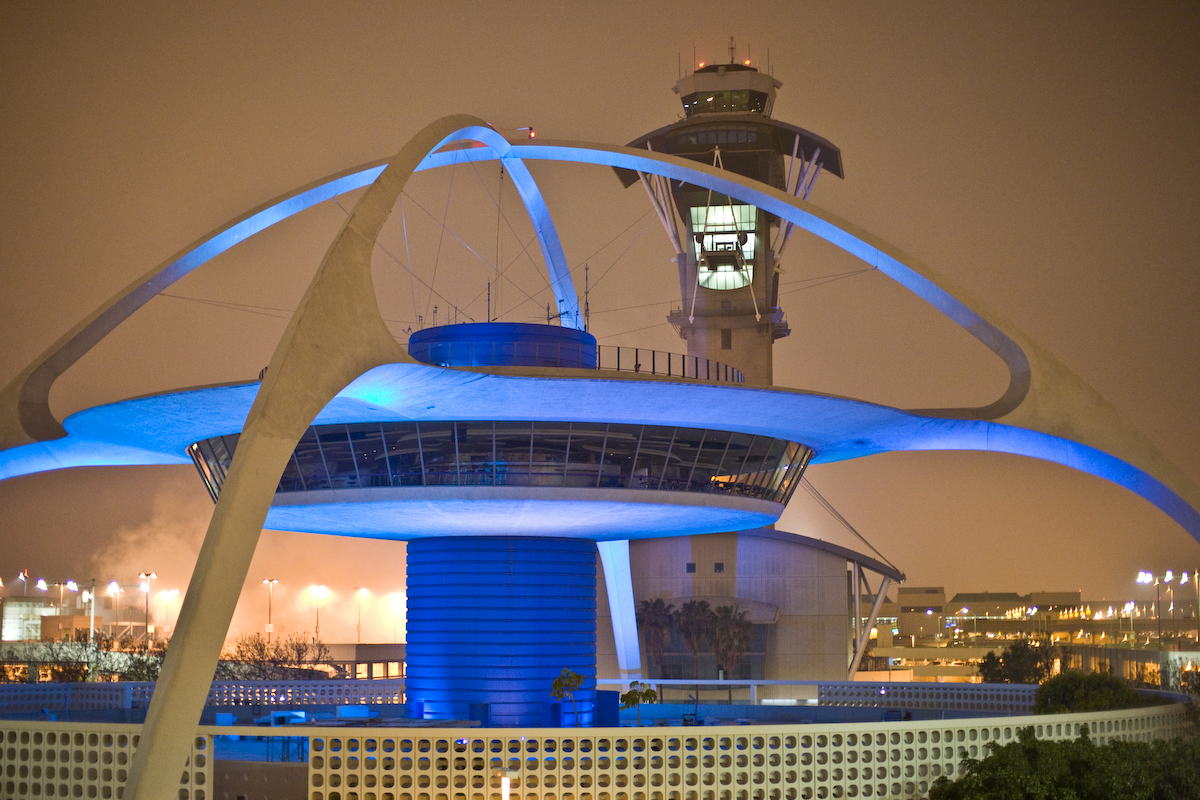
The Theme Building opened in 1961

The Theme Building is a structure at the Los Angeles International Airport which opened in 1961 and is another example of Googie architecture. It was said that the distinctive white building resembles a flying saucer that had landed on its four legs. The Los Angeles City Council designated the building a cultural and historical monument (no.570) in 1993.

== Notable people ==
- Lynette "Squeaky" Fromme
- Phil Hartman, actor, comedian, screenwriter and graphic artist
- Mikel Jollett, musician and writer
- Susanne Marsee, opera singer
- Pat Russell, politician
- Danny Sugerman, music manager
- The Turtles, 1960s rock band; 4 members attended Westchester High School.
- Suicidal Tendencies, crossover thrash band from Venice; at least two of their former members were born and raised in Westchester.

== See also ==
- Centinela Adobe – Historic house in Los Angeles, California
- List of districts and neighborhoods in Los Angeles
