= Pat Russell =

American politician (1923–2021)

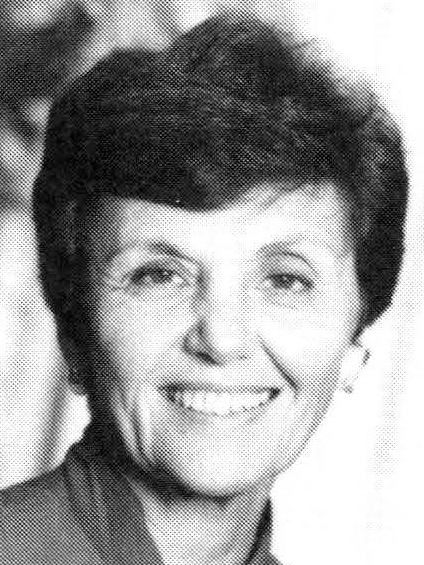
- Official portrait, 1986

Member of the Los Angeles City Council from the 6th district
- In office 1969–1987
- Preceded by: L. E. Timberlake
- Succeeded by: Ruth Galanter

President of the Los Angeles City Council
- In office July 1, 1983 – June 30, 1987
- Preceded by: Joel Wachs
- Succeeded by: John Ferraro

Personal details
- Born: December 31, 1923 Portland, Oregon, U.S.
- Died: February 11, 2021 (aged 97) California, U.S.
- Political party: Democratic
- Education: University of Washington; University of California, Los Angeles
- Occupation: Community activist, politician

Pat Russell (December 31, 1923 – February 11, 2021) was an American community activist and member of the Los Angeles City Council. She was the fourth woman to serve on that city council (1969–87) and the first woman to be City Council president (1983–87).

== Early life ==
Russell was born in Portland, Oregon, on December 31, 1923. Her father, Paul Ostroot, worked for General Mills; her mother, Ruth (Chapman), was a Phi Beta Kappa "in a time when few women competed for college grades." She was educated in Portland and received her Bachelor of Arts from the University of Washington, where she was a Phi Beta Kappa and president of the student body. During World War II she carried mail and worked in a furniture factory. She earned a secondary teaching credential from UCLA.

== Public service ==
=== Nongovernmental ===
Russell was president of the Los Angeles City League of Women Voters in 1963-65 and of the Los Angeles County LWV in 1966-68. She was on the board of directors of the Los Angeles Urban Coalition and was vice president of its transportation task force. She was active in Camp Fire Girls leadership. She was a Los Angeles Times Woman of the Year in 1971 and received a Status of Women Award from the Santa Monica branch of the American Association of University Women in 1972. After her City Council defeat in 1987, Russell organized the Regional Institute of Southern California, a public-private partnership that explored local problems; she worked there "about half time" as the agency head.

=== City Council ===
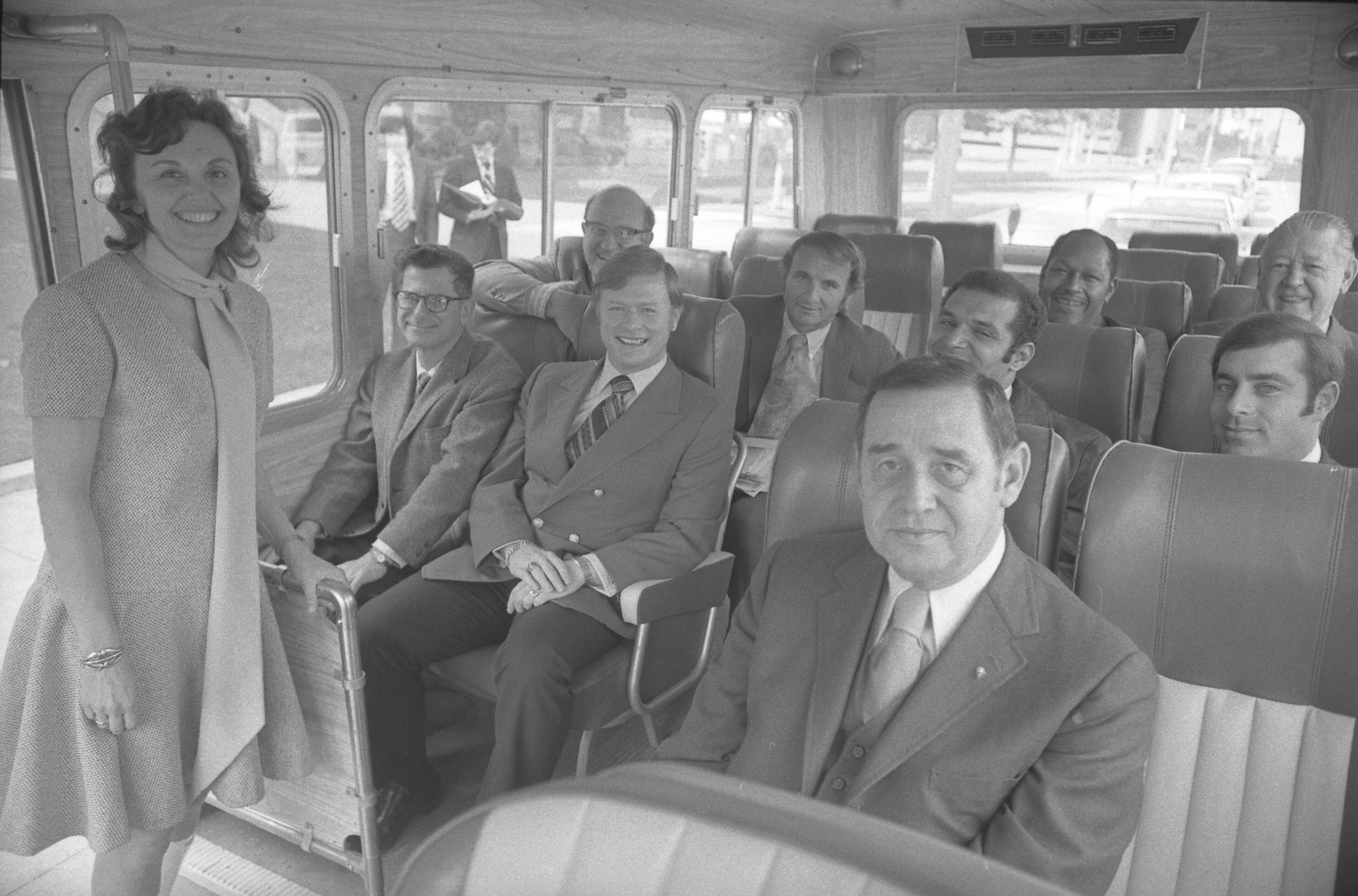
Russell with fellow councilmembers in 1972.

==== Geography ====
Los Angeles City Council District 6 covered:

1969: The Airport area, including Westchester and Playa del Rey, the Baldwin Hills area, including Hyde Park and Leimert Park and the Mar Vista-Venice area.

1975: From the coast inland to the Crenshaw District, with Venice, Westchester and portions of South-Central Los Angeles.

==== Elections ====
With the July 2, 1969, resignation of Councilman L.E. Timberlake, the City Council, by a 9-5 vote, ordered a "precedent-setting" special election to fill the 6th District vacancy. It was to be the first such first-past-the-post special election to fill a council vacancy since the procedure was authorized in a city charter amendment in 1963. The alternative would have been for the City Council to appoint a successor for the remaining term of some years. Russell won the special vote on December 3, 1969, by 620 votes over Frank Small, who had been Timberlake's chief deputy for 16 years. There were three other candidates. Afterward, she said that she was an "independent" and that she considered the problems of noise from Los Angeles Airport and the refurbishing of the Venice canals to be the main issues in her district.

Despite a prediction that she might not be reelected because "She doesn't compromise," voters chose Russell in 1971 over another challenge by Frank Small, and she was elected for the third time in 1975 over light opposition from three candidates and in 1979 over four opponents. She won in the 1983 primary as well. The 1987 vote was a different story. Despite the fact that Russell raised three times as much money as all of her five opponents combined in the primary race, she failed to gain a majority in the April vote, and she had to face Ruth Galanter, an urban planner with backing from environmental groups and people in the entertainment industry, in the final. Galanter was seen as someone who "rode to prominence much as Russell did 18 years ago— as a darling of middle-class protestors angered by major development in their neighborhoods." In addition, the Los Angeles Times reported, Russell's opposition to Proposition U, "the popular anti-growth initiative that passed overwhelmingly in her district, gave rise to the belief that she had fallen out of step with her constituents." Mayor Bradley campaigned for her, but she nevertheless lost the final vote by 15,855 votes to Galanter's 21,846.

==== Presidency ====
After losing two bids for election to the City Council presidency, Russell won in July 1983, the first woman to hold the second-most-powerful position in the city. Responding to suggestions that she gained the post only because of the support of Mayor Tom Bradley, she said: "All my life there have been men who have tried to tell me what to do . . . I think the only people who think that are mostly males who believe that a woman cannot think for herself."

==== Highlights ====
- In 1971 Russell was working with Assembly Member Yvonne Braithwaite to maintain the multiethnic character of the Crenshaw District.
- In 1972 Russell "angrily accused 'the men of this world,' including President Nixon, of fighting child-care centers" after Councilman Robert J. Stevenson opposed a plan for children of city employees to use the Elysian Park Recreation Center on a year-round basis. Later, she was successful in moving an ordinance to "ease the path" for "small, nonprofit centers where working mothers can leave their children in safe hands while the parents work at self-supporting jobs."
- Some City Council members questioned her "recent stands favoring oil drilling in the Pacific Palisades, opposing limits on high-rise buildings in Westwood, weakening a smoking ordinance and tampering with rent control." At the same time, she was credited with "holding together a bitterly divided council long enough . . . to resolve a highly sensitive lawsuit accusing the Los Angeles Police Department of illegal spying on civilians." She noted that she was active in adopting rules that outlawed apartment buildings that prohibited children.

== Personal life ==
Russell married William Treloar Russell, who served in the US Army during World War II, on December 29, 1946. He remained in the Army as a lieutenant colonel for eight years and later became an aerospace engineer with TRW. Together, they had three children: Steven, David, and Mercedes. The family relocated to Westchester, Los Angeles, in 1953. By January 1985, the couple had separated, but they kept in touch with each other, taking outdoor trips and "having dinner with him virtually every night during the Christmas holidays."

A Los Angeles Times reporter noted that during the early part of her career as a councilwoman, she "showed off more in public, when she wore muumuus to work along with earrings shaped like watermelons, when she quoted Chinese philosophers, made no secret of the personal flotation tank she owned, and once missed a council meeting to attend a wilderness retreat sponsored by est," which she later said gave her a sense of "empowerment." After her election to the City Council presidency, however, she presented "a tailored, stylish appearance and a politely distant manner that has been described as both presidential and imperious." It was said that she had her goal set on the mayoralty. Russell led a healthy, outdoor life, running several miles a day in 1985 and engaging in strenuous mountain hikes. At age 67 in 1991 she ran twenty-five miles a week and was in the Salton Sea area with her husband, from whom she still lived apart, for a 16-mile, 6,500-foot climb.

Russell died at her home on February 11, 2021. She was 97 and had cancer before her death.

== Quotations ==
- "I think of myself as a white, middle-age, middle-class suburban housewife. But in many ways, I also think that's my value."
- "Maybe the women's libbers don't like me for it too much, but I absorb whatever chauvinism and paternalism there may be as long as I can keep the accent on issues and performance. I enjoy being with men, and I think they enjoy having me there; that's what we need more of in working life."
- "You avoid fighting by taking care of everything, all the opposing arguments, ahead of time."

Political offices
Preceded by L.E. Timberlake	Los Angeles City Council, 6th District; 1969–87	Succeeded by Ruth Galanter
Preceded by Joel Wachs	Los Angeles City Council, 6th District; 1983–87	Succeeded by John Ferraro
