= Mike Hernandez =

American politician (born 1952)

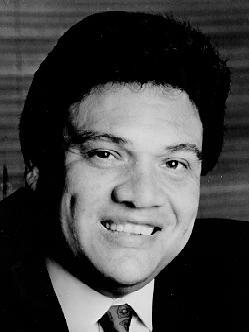
- Official portrait, 1999

Member of the Los Angeles City Council for the 1st district
- In office August 13, 1991 – June 30, 2001
- Preceded by: Gloria Molina
- Succeeded by: Ed Reyes

Assistant President Pro Tempore for the Los Angeles City Council
- In office July 1, 1995 – June 30, 1997
- Preceded by: Richard Alatorre
- Succeeded by: Ruth Galanter

Personal details
- Born: December 4, 1952 (age 73) Pleasanton, California, U.S.
- Party: Democratic
- Occupation: Latino community activist
- Mike Hernandez's voice Mike Hernandez on how the City Council can communicate information during the 1992 riots Recorded April 30, 1992

Mike Hernandez (born December 4, 1952) is an American politician and activist, who served as a member of the Los Angeles City Council for the 1st district from 1991 to 2001, despite an arrest for cocaine possession in 1997 that led to a guilty plea. A member of the Democratic Party, Hernandez became known for his work in the Latino community. He organized students to participate in the Chicano Moratorium, helped register over 25,000 new Latino voters in one year, and was the Founding Chair of Plaza de la Raza Head Start Inc.

== Career ==
Hernandez was a bail bondsman before entering politics.

Elected in 1991 in a special election to complete the unfinished term of previous Councilmember Gloria Molina who had moved on to the Los Angeles County Board of Supervisors, Hernandez became the fourth Latino elected to the Los Angeles City Council since the election of Edward Roybal in 1948. While drawing much of his early electoral support from voters of the Northeast Los Angeles communities that made up much of his district, Hernandez represented some of the poorest areas of the city including MacArthur Park, Westlake and Pico Union.

Hernandez won election three times, but was "not a universally welcome presence" on the council.

=== Zones of Need ===
Shortly after his election, Hernandez began to build the argument that his district was people rich and resource poor. In order to do this, Hernandez turned to the most recent census data and created a series of maps he deemed “the Zones of Need” that he released in the fall of 1992. This data acted as a launching point for much of the legislation Hernandez was to champion during his early years as a council member and gave weight to the argument that his district was being short-changed causing one writer to note about Hernandez:

=== Taylor Yard ===
Shortly after taking office, Hernandez threatened to file suit against the Los Angeles County Transportation Commission (LACTC) who, during the 5-month hiatus of any representation between the time Gloria Molina moved to the County Board of Supervisors and Hernandez was elected to replace her, constructed a maintenance facility at a nearby rail yard without producing an Environmental Impact Report (EIR). As part of the settlement, LACTC agreed to fund a series of community workshops for local residents.Hernandez put a call out to his community to attend critical planning meetings, an announcement which was picked up and published thus in the Los Angeles Times on November 12, 1992:

The workshops were funded by the Los Angeles County Transportation Commission (LACTC) who were forced to do so under threat of a lawsuit by the City of Los Angeles which Hernandez initiated.

== Personal life ==
Hernandez was arrested in Pacoima in 1997 for cocaine possession. He posted bail and checked into a rehabilitation facility, which allowed him to avoid a felony conviction and therefore to keep his council seat. The investigation found he had been sued for failure to pay debts and nearly lost his house due to financial troubles from his addiction.

Preceded by Gloria Molina	Los Angeles City Councilman; 1st district 1991—2001	Succeeded by Ed Reyes
Preceded by Richard Alatorre	Assistant President Pro Tempore for the Los Angeles City Council; 1995–1997	Succeeded by Ruth Galanter
