= Los Angeles's 6th City Council district =

American legislative district

Councilmember
Imelda Padilla; D–Sun Valley
since August 1, 2023
- Demographics: 48.0% White; 3.6% Black; 34.2% Hispanic; 0.9% Asian; 13.3% Other
- Population (2020): 260,301
- Registered voters (2017): 104,559
- Website: cd6.lacity.gov

Los Angeles's 6th City Council district is one of the fifteen districts in the Los Angeles City Council. It is currently represented by Imelda Padilla.

The district was created in 1925 after a new city charter was passed, which replaced the former "at large" voting system for a nine-member council with a district system with a 15-member council. As the city expanded to the north and west, the 6th District's boundaries gradually shifted in those directions, but in 2002 the boundaries of the entire district were lifted out of West Los Angeles and transferred to the San Fernando Valley, as was the then-representative, Ruth Galanter, who protested the suddenness of the move.

== Geography ==
The district includes the neighborhoods of North Hollywood, Sun Valley, Van Nuys, Lake Balboa, Panorama City, Pacoima and Arleta.

It is encompassed in California's 29th congressional district, California's 20th and 27th State Senate districts, and California's 43rd and 46th State Assembly districts.

=== Historical boundaries ===
When the district was created in 1925, it encompassed the Hyde Park and Angeles Mesa annexations and Vermont Avenue south to 62nd Street as well as a shoestring strip leading to present-day Westchester, Mines Field and the Hyperion sewage screening plant. By next year the Exposition Park area was included. In 1928, the boundary ". . . remains as Vermont avenue on the east. The south line runs along Manchester avenue to Van Ness avenue, then the boundary turns north to Slauson Avenue, on which it continues west to Angeles Mesa Drive and then to Exposition boulevard, where it turns east to Arlington avenue. It follows that avenue south to Vermont avenue and goes east on Vernon"

In 1933, due to the exceptional growth of the western part of the city, a "general movement toward the ocean was necessary". By 1940, the general trend is westward and northeastward, "due to heavy construction in the San Fernando Valley and the beach areas." Eastern section remains the same as 1937, but to the district is added the Shoestring Strip north of Inglewood and an area as far west as Sepulveda Boulevard. By 1955, the district was a "big jig saw puzzle and stretching from Venice, Playa del Rey and Westchester to Leimert Park."

In 1960, Venice was lost from the 6th District to the 11th, and Baldwin Hills was shifted to the 6th from 10th. By 1969, the district had the Airport area, including Westchester and Playa del Rey, the Baldwin Hills area, including Hyde Park and Leimert Park and the Mar Vista-Venice area.

In 1975, it spanned from the coast inland to the Crenshaw District, and includes Venice, Ocean Park, Westchester and portions of South-Central Los Angeles. By 1992, it spanned from Venice, Playa del Rey and Westchester east to the Crenshaw District. In 2002, it was transferred to the east San Fernando Valley, "where a Latino would have a good chance to win."

== List of members representing the district ==
=== 1889–1909 ===
Councilmember	Party	Years	Electoral history
Single-member ward established February 25, 1889
A. N. Hamilton (Echo Park)	Republican	February 25, 1889 – December 5, 1890	Elected in 1889. [data missing]
C. H. Alford (Downtown)	Republican	December 5, 1890 – December 12, 1892	Elected in 1890. [data missing]
George D. Pessell (Downtown)	Democratic	December 12, 1892 – December 16, 1896	Elected in 1892. Re-elected in 1894. Retired to run for L.A. County Board of Supervisors.
Leroy M. Grider (Downtown)	Democratic	December 16, 1896 – December 15, 1898	Elected in 1896. [data missing]
George D. Pessell (Downtown)	Democratic	December 15, 1898 – December 12, 1900	Elected in 1898. [data missing]
A. A. Allen (Downtown)	Republican	December 12, 1900 – December 5, 1902	Elected in 1900. Retired.
James P. Davenport (Pico-Union)	Republican	December 5, 1902 – September 16, 1904	Elected in 1902. Recalled from office.
Arthur D. Houghton (Downtown)	Nonpartisan	September 16, 1904 – December 13, 1906	Elected to finish Davenport's term. Re-elected in 1904. Retired.
Henry H. Yonkin (South Central)	Republican	December 13, 1906 – December 10, 1909	Elected in 1906. Redistricted to the at-large district and lost re-election.
Single-member ward eliminated December 10, 1909

=== 1925–present ===
Councilmember	Party	Dates	Electoral history
District created July 1, 1925
Edward E. Moore (Vermont Square)	Republican	July 1, 1925 – June 30, 1927	Elected in 1925. Lost re-election.
Lester R. Rice-Wray (Palms)	Democratic	July 1, 1927 – August 28, 1928	Elected in 1927. Recalled from office.
James G. McAllister (Vermont Square)	Republican	August 28, 1928 – June 30, 1933	Elected to finish Rice-Wray's term. Re-elected in 1929. Lost re-election.
Earl C. Gay (Chesterfield Square)	Republican	July 1, 1933 – June 30, 1945	Elected in 1933. Re-elected in 1937. Re-elected in 1941. Lost re-election.
L. E. Timberlake (Gramercy Park)	Democratic	July 1, 1945 – July 2, 1969	Elected in 1945. Re-elected in 1947. Re-elected in 1949. Re-elected in 1951. Re-elected in 1953. Re-elected in 1955. Re-elected in 1959. Re-elected in 1963. Re-elected in 1967. Retired early.
Vacant		July 2, 1969 – December 8, 1969	
Pat Russell (Westchester)	Democratic	December 8, 1969 – June 30, 1987	Elected to finish Timberlake's term. Re-elected in 1971. Re-elected in 1975. Re-elected in 1979. Re-elected in 1983. Lost re-election.
Ruth Galanter (Venice)	Democratic	July 1, 1987 – June 30, 2003	Elected in 1987. Re-election in 1991. Re-election in 1995. Re-election in 1999. Retired due to term limits.
Tony Cárdenas (Sylmar)	Democratic	July 1, 2003 – January 3, 2013	Elected in 2003. Re-elected in 2007. Re-elected in 2011. Resigned when elected to the U.S. House of Representatives.
Vacant		January 3, 2013 – August 29, 2013	
Nury Martinez (Sun Valley)	Democratic	August 29, 2013 – October 12, 2022	Elected to finish Cárdenas's term. Re-elected in 2015. Re-elected in 2020. Resigned due to a political scandal.
Vacant		October 12, 2022 – July 5, 2023	Chief Legislative Analyst Sharon Tso appointed as caretaker until next election.
Vacant		July 5, 2023 – August 1, 2023	Member-elect Imelda Padilla appointed as caretaker until certification of election.
Imelda Padilla (Sun Valley)	Democratic	August 1, 2023 – present	Elected to finish Martinez's term. Re-elected in 2024.

== See also ==
- Los Angeles City Council districts
- San Fernando Valley
