= Estelle Lawton Lindsey =

American journalist

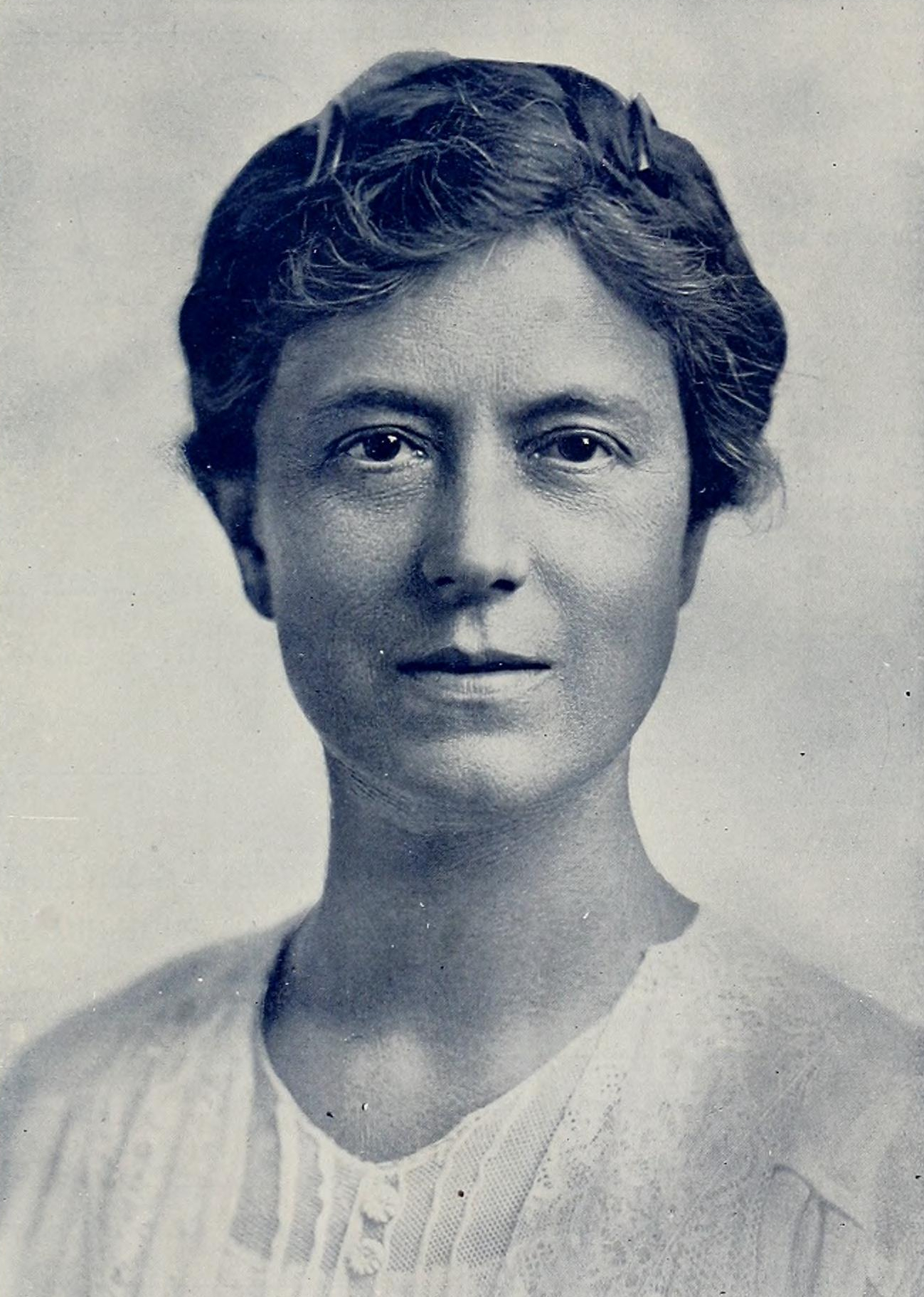
- Lindsey c. 1917

Member of the Los Angeles City Council for the at-large district
- In office July 1, 1915 – July 1, 1917

Personal details
- Born: c. 1868 South Carolina, U.S.
- Died: 1955 (aged 86–87) Glendale, California, U.S.
- Party: Socialist (until 1915)
- Occupation: Journalist
- Known for: First female member of the Los Angeles City Council

Estelle Lawton Lindsey (c. 1868 – 1955) was an American journalist who was also the first female City Council member in Los Angeles, California, (1915–17) the first woman to preside over the City Council there and the first woman to act as mayor in any American city of comparable size.

== Biography ==
Lawton was born in South Carolina, and while living in the South she engaged in china painting and portrait sketching. She told an interviewer in 1935 that this "genteel pastime" was "far from remunerative," so she decided to become a writer. She gained her first experience in "reporting Chautauquas" (lectures) for the local press. She was at one time a German teacher and taught school in Owensboro, Kentucky. She also worked for the Internal Revenue Service in Kentucky, where she met the man she married, Dudley Lindsey. They moved to Los Angeles in 1908, making their home at 2416 Echo Park Avenue, and she wrote for the Los Angeles Tribune and the Los Angeles Express. After her City Council service, she wrote a syndicated newspaper column and was active in civic and philanthropic work.

Lindsey died at the age of 87 on November 27, 1955, in Glendale, California, after a fall in her home, and she was buried in Forest Lawn Memorial Park, Glendale. She was survived by her husband and a sister, Mrs. Charles Hite.

== Political activity ==
=== Socialism ===
According to Sherry Katz of the University of California, Berkeley, Lindsey was part of a "well-organized network of socialist women that operated as an influential political tendency within California's radical and women's movements during the Progressive Era." This group backed Lindsey when she ran unsuccessfully on the Socialist ticket for the California Assembly in 1912 and 1914. In the 1914 race in the 61st District, she came in second among five candidates, with 22.2% of the vote against 31% for the winner, Henry A. Wishard. But she was expelled from what was called the "Red Ticket" wing of the Socialist Party because she had supported non-Socialists in the election.

=== City Council ===
==== Elections ====
Between 1909 and 1925, Los Angeles City Council members were elected in a first-past-the-post at-large voting system: Voters could cast their ballots for up to nine candidates, and the eighteen candidates who received the highest number of votes in a primary election then faced the voters a month later in the final round. The top nine in that contest were declared the winners, taking their seats on July 1 of every odd-numbered year.

In the 1915 final election, Lindsey was one of the nine victors, just four years after women had voted in municipal elections for the first time. The Los Angeles Times commented:

The race of Estelle Lawton Lindsey was the one remarkable feature of the Council fight. She landed in sixth place with 41,437 votes. Mrs. Lindsey bears the distinction of being the first woman to serve on the Council in Los Angeles and one of the few women in public life ever given so important a commission.

==== Acting mayor ====
Lindsey was chosen as acting council president, and on July 17 she took the chair in a session that impelled the Times to headline its story "Woman Presides Over Council; Mrs. Lindsey Wields Gavel for Day's Session." On September 11, 1915, with both Mayor Charles E. Sebastian and Council President Martin F. Betkouski out of the city, Lindsey became Los Angeles's first woman acting mayor for the day.

When Lindsey entered the mayor's office, she was

greeted with a salute of seventeen flashlight guns . . . and began the day's work. Later in the day, a battery of rapid-fire movie cameras was also turned on her. Through it all, Mrs. Lindsey carried the weight of office with smiling dignity, receiving scores of callers whose business ranged from bearing greetings of the Governor of Pennsylvania to seeking the loan of a quarter.

The stint had unexpected consequences two weeks later when City Attorney Albert Lee Stephens Sr. discovered that the city could be held liable for a default judgment because it had not responded to a summons served in a lawsuit seeking $117,000 in damages by a person who said his property was damaged by the "lowering of the Broadway tunnel." The summons was found in the papers that Lindsey had with her when she left the mayor's office.

==== Activities ====
Lindsey "championed public health measures, pressed enforcement of the state's anti-prostitution law, fought for greater city services for impoverished women and secured the appointment of several female deputies assigned to investigate crimes against women and children." She opposed the policy of the city's employment bureau to furnish strikebreakers to employers.

Other activities included:

- A campaign for better facilities for women prisoners, "and within a few weeks it is proposed to establish quarters for them on the City Inebriate Farm" where they "may be employed out of doors."
- Urging the council to adopt an ordinance forbidding any person with a connection with the motion picture business from serving on the Board of Motion Picture Censors. She later advocated the establishment of separate motion-picture theaters for children under age 15.
- Several initiatives to improve public health, including regulations "to compel the public bath-houses of the city to observe sanitary precautions which will prevent infection of patients" and the abolition of shared public drinking cups.
- An unsuccessful attempt to require buildings, apartments, hotels and saloons to have the name and address of the owner placed above the front door.

==== Billboards ====
Lindsey was vehemently attacked by Los Angeles newspapers for her stand in opposition to a proposed—and very controversial—ordinance that would limit the placement, size and number of advertising billboards in the city. Before the ordinance was adopted, she read into the record a lengthy article published in the June 10, 1917, issue of the New York Tribune "in which the newspapers and other big institutions of Los Angeles were assailed." She said she planned to wage a campaign against the local papers. The next week, at the last meeting before Lindsey's term was to expire, the council voted 5–3 to expunge the remarks from the written record because, as Councilman James Simpson Conwell said, he did not think it "proper or just that such a falsehood should creep into the official minutes of the council."

=== Post-Council ===
She was appointed to the city Humane Commission by Mayor Fletcher Bowron in July 1944.

== Other reading ==
- Jenny Burman, "Echo Park's Lindsay First Woman in U.S. to Win Major Municipal Office," Historic Echo Park
