= 1923 Los Angeles mayoral election =

- May 1, 1923
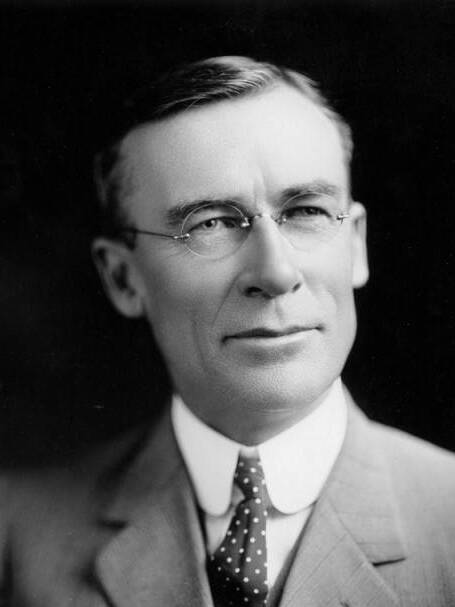

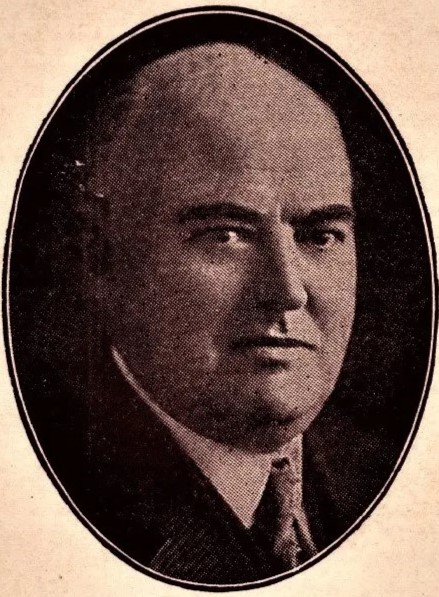

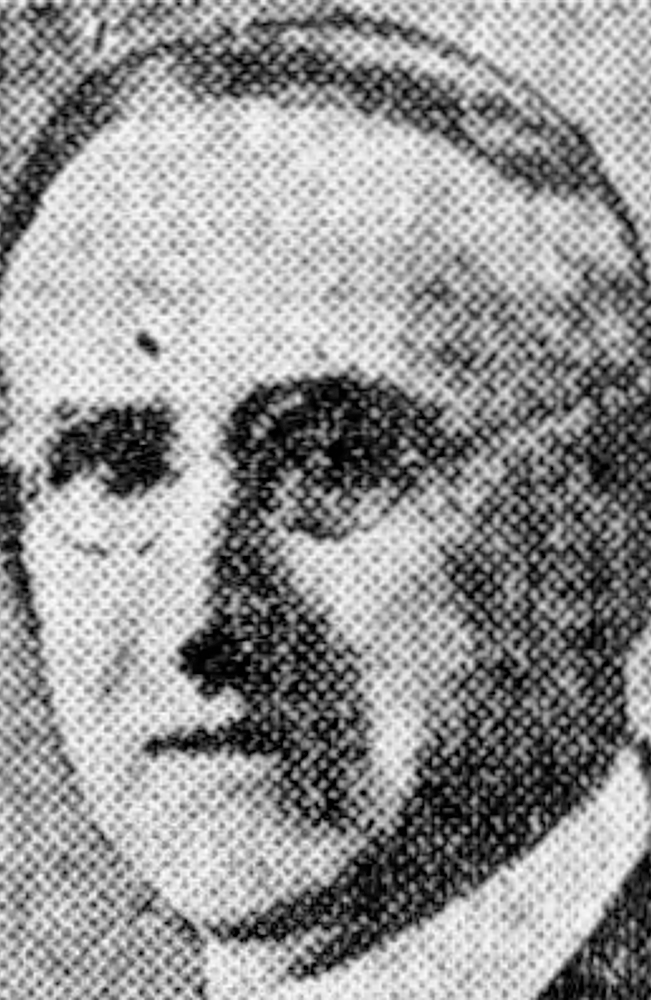
Candidate	George E. Cryer	Bert L. Farmer	Edward E. Moore
Popular vote	61,688	17,642	7,470
Percentage	67.9%	19.4%	8.2%
Mayor before election
George E. Cryer
Elected Mayor
George E. Cryer

The 1923 Los Angeles mayoral election took place on May 1, 1923. Incumbent George E. Cryer was re-elected over four challengers, which included former Councilman Bert L. Farmer and former Indiana Senator Edward E. Moore.

Municipal elections in California, including Mayor of Los Angeles, are officially nonpartisan; candidates' party affiliations do not appear on the ballot.

== Election ==
Incumbent George E. Cryer had been elected in 1921 over Meredith P. Snyder and was seeking re-election for a second term. He was challenged by former Councilman Bert L. Farmer and former Indiana Senator Edward E. Moore. In the election, Farmer campaigned for charter reform and said that he would "harmonize the various city departments." Cryer was very popular, being endorsed by the Los Angeles Times and the Municipal League, and won re-election in a landslide.

== Results ==
Los Angeles mayoral general election, May 1, 1923
Candidate	Votes	%
George E. Cryer (incumbent)	61,688	67.92
Bert L. Farmer	17,642	19.42
Edward E. Moore	7,470	8.23
E. H. Hancock	3,301	3.64
Ralph L. Knapp	723	0.80
Total votes	90,824	100.00
