= Arthur Houghton =

Arthur Houghton may refer to:

- Douglas Houghton, Baron Houghton of Sowerby (Arthur Leslie Noel Douglas Houghton, 1898–1996), British politician
- Arthur Boyd Houghton (1836–1875), British painter and illustrator
- Arthur D. Houghton (1870–1938), medical doctor, botanistand one of the founders of the American Legion
- Arthur A. Houghton Jr. (1906–1990), American industrialist
