= Harold A. Henry =

American politician

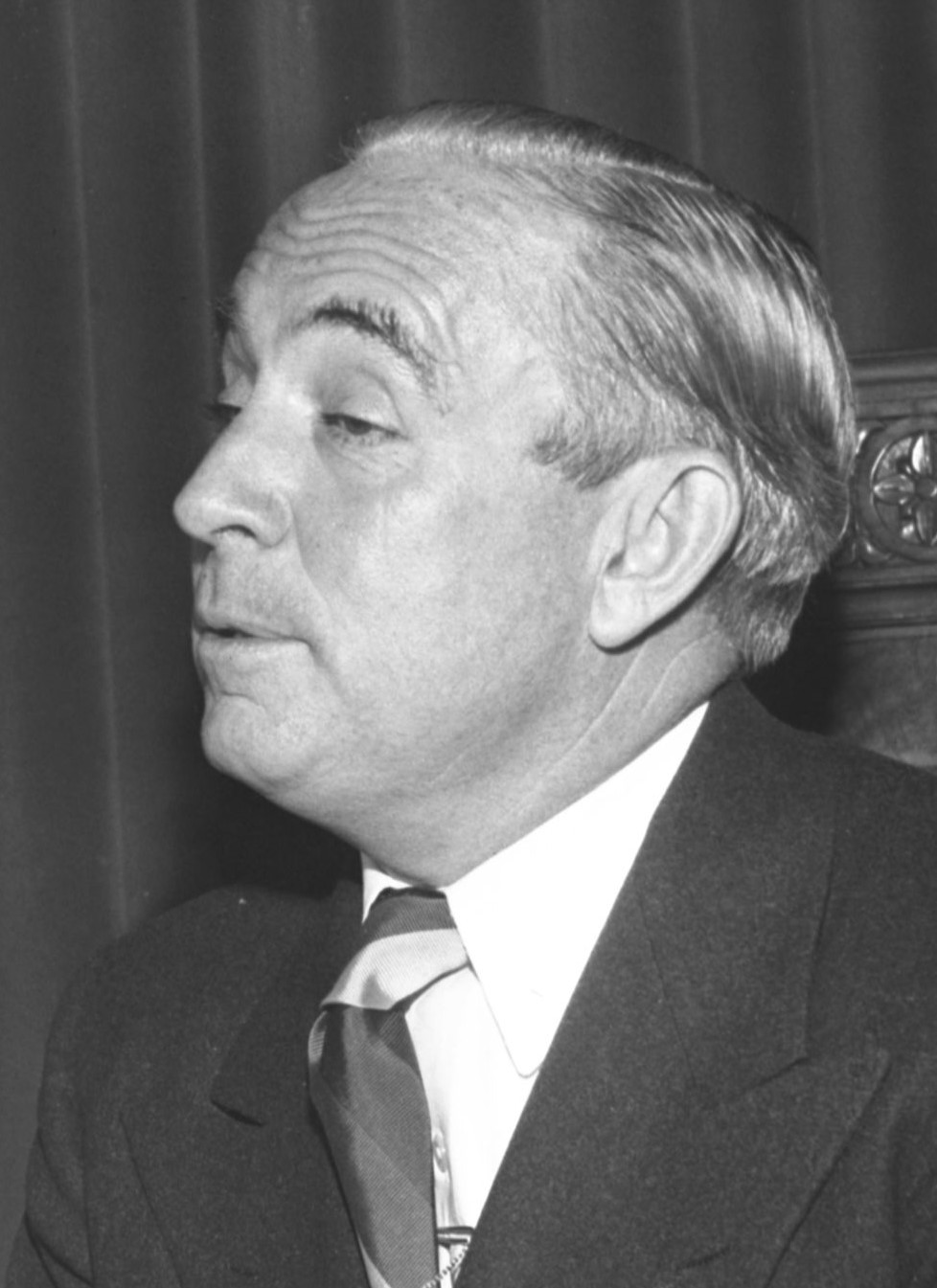
- Henry in 1947

President of the Los Angeles City Council
- In office July 1, 1947 – June 30, 1953
- Preceded by: George H. Moore
- Succeeded by: John S. Gibson Jr.
- In office July 1, 1961 – June 30, 1963
- Preceded by: John S. Gibson Jr.
- Succeeded by: L. E. Timberlake

Member of the Los Angeles City Council from the 4th district
- In office July 1, 1945 – May 1, 1966
- Preceded by: Robert L. Burns
- Succeeded by: John Ferraro

Personal details
- Born: October 20, 1895; Virginia City, Nevada, U.S.
- Died: May 1, 1966 (aged 70); Los Angeles, California, U.S.
- Political party: Republican

Harold A. Henry (October 20, 1895 – May 1, 1966) was a community newspaper publisher who was elected to the Los Angeles City Council in 1945 and was its president for four terms from 1947 to 1962.

== Biography ==
Henry was born October 20, 1895, in Virginia City, Nevada, and went to school in Reno and at the University of Nevada. After being discharged from service in World War I, he became a reporter on the Los Angeles Examiner, and in 1925 he established a community newspaper, the Wilshire Press, which he edited and published until 1941. During this time he helped reorganize the Western Avenue Business Association into the Wilshire Chamber of Commerce in 1937 and was its secretary-manager until 1950.

He died May 1, 1966, after a lengthy illness. He was survived by his wife, June, whom he had married in 1965. His first wife, Marie, died in 1963. He was also survived by a daughter, Mary Uglow. He lived at 112 S. Lucerne Avenue in Windsor Square at West First Street. Funeral services were conducted at Wilshire Methodist Church, and interment was at Rose Hills Memorial Park, Whittier.

He bequeathed $50,000 and all his personal effects to his wife June and stated that "prior provisions" had been made for her. He gave $5,000 to his housekeeper and $10,000 to his secretary. Two nephews of his first wife were left $5,000 each. Real property was left to his daughter, and the remainder of the estate was placed in trust, to be paid to his daughter at $1,000 a month.

== Public service ==
=== Commissions ===
In 1938 Mayor Fletcher Bowron appointed him to the city's Playground and Recreation Commission. He served until 1945 and was commission president for four years. He was later a member of the Los Angeles Coliseum Commission.

=== City Council ===
==== Elections ====
Henry ran for the Los Angeles City Council District 4 seat of retiring Councilman Robert L. Burns in 1945 and was elected in the final vote. In every contest thereafter through 1959 he was reelected in the primary election.

In 1955 the district included much of the Wilshire district and in general was bounded by Fountain Avenue, Wilshire Boulevard, Fairfax Avenue and Catalina Street.

Henry also ran unsuccessfully for Los Angeles County supervisor in 1958.

==== Presidency ====
Henry was president of the City Council for four two-year terms, beginning 1947, 1949, 1951 and 1961. As such he was acting mayor when the mayor was out of the state. His first term resulted from a closed meeting by the City Council at the Jonathan Club, when nine of fifteen council members voted to seat him in place of the then-president, George H. Moore.

As acting mayor he was responsible for issuing many special declarations, including:

- Brotherhood Week. "The cornerstone of American democracy rests on brotherhood and understanding among the Protestants, Catholics and Jews of our nation," he said in February 1950.
- Free Football for Kids Week, when he posed for a photo with children of Los Angeles Rams coaches in October 1951.
- My L.A. Week. In honor of the opening of a new musical based upon the popular newspaper columns of Matt Weinstock, December 1951.
- Hungarian Freedom Fighters Day. Memorializing October 23, 1956, when Hungarians began "a short-lived revolt against their Communist overlords."

Henry ordered the temporary cessation of monthly air raid alarm testing during the 1962 Cuban Missile Crisis at the request of the California Disaster Council, to avoid public panic.

==== Positions ====
Un-American, 1952. Henry and Council Members Kenneth Hahn, Earle D. Baker and J. Win Austin attended a dinner meeting in South Gate to honor the House Committee on Un-American Activities.

Timberlake, 1953. Henry was in dispute with Council Member L.E. Timberlake over many issues, including a controversial $1 million plan to build public housing in Los Angeles (Timberlake favoring and Henry opposing), with Timberlake disputing many of Henry's rulings from the chair. One of them upset Henry so much that in January 1953 he was led to exclaim, "Mr. Timberlake, if you persist in this intolerable situation, there will be ways devised to prevent you!"

West Hollywood, 1957. He was instrumental in assuring that the city of Los Angeles remained neutral in a 1957 proposal by West Hollywood residents to incorporate as a city.

Dodgers, 1958. Henry was one of the three council members—Patrick D. McGee and John C. Holland being the others—who voted in 1958 against a proposal to turn Chavez Ravine over to the Los Angeles Dodgers for use as a baseball stadium.

Teachers, 1959. He was active in work of the Senior League, sponsor of the annual Teachers Remembrance Day.

Sanitation, 1961. He had a separate, $100-a-month position as city representative on the County Sanitation District, to which he reappointed himself in July 1961. That pay was in addition to his salary of $12,000 as a council member.

Human relations, 1964. After a heated City Council debate, Henry voted with the prevailing side in rejecting calls for the establishment of a separate city Human Relations Commission. The majority decided instead to maintain city membership in a similar county agency.

== Legacy ==
Henry was active in the development and beautification of Wilshire Boulevard and the Miracle Mile. After Henry's death, Mayor Samuel W. Yorty said of the Wilshire District, "Perhaps no man in the past quarter of a century contributed as much to its growth and development as Hal Henry, [who] devoted all of his energies to still more projects to enhance the beauty and economic posture of one of the nation's most magnificent thoroughfares."

Council President L.E. Timberlake burst into tears as he began a eulogy of Henry at a council session and could not continue. Erwin Baker, a Los Angeles Times City Hall reporter, recalled that Henry was a "quiet debater on the council floor" who "could cut to the heart of an issue with his dry humor and intimate knowledge of parliamentary procedure."

In January 1967, a six-story office building at 500 Shatto Place was dedicated to Henry's memory, with a plaque calling him a "servant of the people, Wilshire Center District." He is memorialized with a city park bearing his name at 890 South Lucerne Avenue, with a children's play area and a picnic area.

Preceded by Robert L. Burns	Los Angeles City Council; 4th District; 1945–63	Succeeded by John Ferraro
Preceded by George H. Moore	President of the Los Angeles City Council; 1947-1953; 1961-1963	Succeeded by John S. Gibson Jr.
Preceded by John S. Gibson Jr.	President of the Los Angeles City Council; 1947-1953; 1961-1963	Succeeded by L. E. Timberlake
