= Earl Lectures =

The Earl Lectures are a series of public lectures on religion held at the Pacific School of Religion in Berkeley, California. Founded in 1901, they are supported by an endowment of Edwin T. Earl. They are open to members of the general public, and since 1921, a pastoral seminary has been linked with the talks. Speakers' fees have been used to fund the seminary. They are a three-day event which normally takes place each year in January. Speakers who have delivered the talks include Maya Angelou, Paul Tillich (1963), Theodore Roosevelt (1911), Elie Wiesel and Kosuke Koyama (1975).
