= Witten William Harris =

American politician

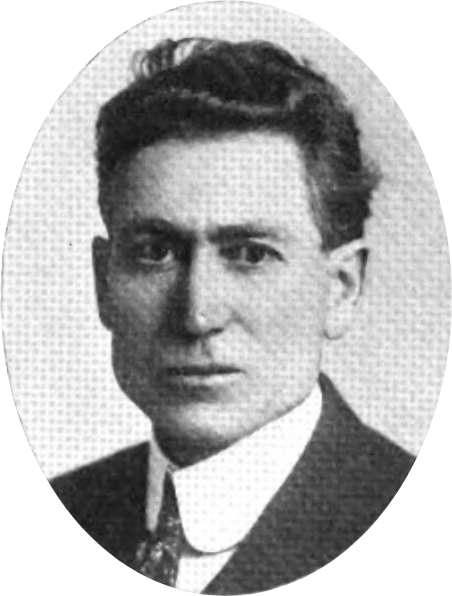
- Harris c. 1915

Member of the California State Assembly from the 56th district
- In office January 4, 1915 – January 6, 1919
- Preceded by: William E. Simpson
- Succeeded by: Grace S. Dorris

Personal details
- Born: August 17, 1872 Gentry County, Missouri, U.S.
- Died: January 28, 1958 (aged 85) Alameda, California, U.S.
- Party: Socialist; Democratic; Republican; Progressive
- Spouse: Louise Murphy (m. 1897)
- Children: Gerald; Robert; George; Witten Jr.
- Education: Central Christian College (B.A.)
- Occupation: Newspaper writer, editor

Witten William Harris (August 17, 1872 – January 28, 1958) was an American newspaper publisher and politician who served two terms in the California State Assembly for the 56th district from 1915 to 1919. Harris was one of three Socialists elected to the California State Assembly in 1914, the other two being George W. Downing and Lewis A. Spengler. Harris also served as a vice president of the California Labor Federation.

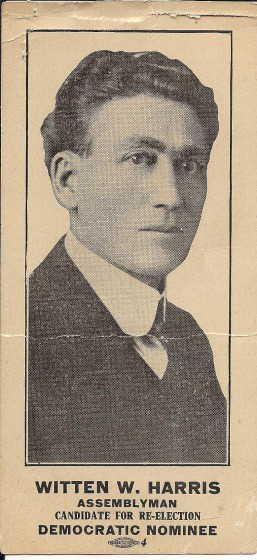
1916 re-election advertisement for Harris after having switched to the Democratic Party

While he was first elected as a Socialist, Harris also won the nominations of the Democratic, Republican, and Progressive parties, leaving him unopposed in the general election. Despite having been previously active in the Socialist Party of California, upon being sworn in Harris immediately joined the Non-Partisan caucus. He was expelled from the party as a result. Two years later, he ran for re-election and won as a Democrat. In 1918, he chose to run for Congress in the 7th district, again as a Democrat, but lost the primary.
