= Kosuke Koyama =

Japanese theologian (1929–2009)

- Born: December 10, 1929; Tokyo, Empire of Japan
- Died: March 25, 2009 (aged 79); Springfield, Massachusetts, U.S.
- Education: Drew Theological Seminary; Princeton Theological Seminary
- Occupation: Theologian
- Employers: University of Otago; Union Theological Seminary
- Notable work: Water Buffalo Theology (1974); Mount Fuji and Mount Sinai (1985)
- Theological work
- Main interests: Liberation theology

Kosuke Koyama (小山 晃佑, Koyama Kōsuke; December 10, 1929 – March 25, 2009) was a Japanese Protestant Christian theologian.

== Biography ==
Koyama was born in Tokyo in 1929, of Christian parents. He later moved to New Jersey in the United States, where he completed his B.D. at Drew Theological Seminary and his Ph.D. at Princeton Theological Seminary, the latter on the interpretation of the Psalms of Martin Luther in 1959.

After teaching at a theological seminary in Thailand, he was the executive director of Association of Theological Schools in Southeast Asia with his office in Singapore from 1968 to 1974, and the editor of Southeast Asia Journal of Theology, and the dean of Southeast Asia Graduate School of Theology. After that he worked as senior lecturer in religious studies at the University of Otago in Dunedin in New Zealand, from 1974 to 1979. He later worked at the Union Theological Seminary in New York City, where he stayed until his retirement in 1996 as John D. Rockefeller Jr. Professor Emeritus of World Christianity. To his close friends and family, he was known as "Ko". Along with Kazoh Kitamori, he is considered one of the leading Japanese theologians of the twentieth century.

Koyama died at a hospital in Springfield, Massachusetts, of pneumonia complicated by oesophagal cancer, on March 25, 2009. His wife Lois died April 13, 2011. He is survived two sons, a daughter, and five grandchildren.

== Writings ==
In works such as Water Buffalo Theology and Three Mile an Hour God, he defended a theology that he considered to be accessible to the peasantry in developing nations, rather than an overly academic systematic theology. In total, Koyama wrote thirteen books. One of his most well-known books, "Water Buffalo Theology", was described as "ecological theology, liberation theology and contribution to Christian-Buddhist dialogue".

Water Buffalo Theology is probably Koyama's best-known work. The book was partly inspired by Koyama's work as a missionary in Northern Thailand. His works of Mount Sinai and Mount Fuji and Water Buffalo Theology are, in part, an examination of Christian theology within the context of Thai Buddhist society, growing out of Koyama's missionary experience in Thailand. Koyama was an editor of the South East Asia Journal of Theology, for which he himself wrote a considerable number of articles. Koyama published at least thirteen books, including "On Christian Life" (currently available only in Japanese) and over one hundred scholarly articles. Koyama's work has been described as helping to bridge the boundaries between East and West, between Christianity and Buddhist thought, between the rich and the poor. It has been pointed out that he has no overarching system in this theology, which shows commitment to serving a "broken Christ trying to heal a broken world". He was named as an important figure for the development of a world Christianity.

In No Handle on the Cross: An Asian Mediation on the Crucified Mind (1976), Koyama explained how the cross can be considered the symbol of Christian suffering, and began the book with a chapter entitled "The Cross and the Lunchbox". Koyama explained, in the preface to this book, which he wrote in Tokyo at Christmas 1975, how he did Christian missionary work in Thailand from 1960 to 1968, and how his experiences in Thailand rekindled interest in Asian religion in him. He also explained in the preface how the book grew out of the Earl Lectures which he delivered at the Pacific School of Religion in California. Koyama also spoke at a conference in Edinburgh in 1985, in which he described God as "a hot God", suggesting a certain dynamic quality to the attributes of God. In this book, he reflected on his interest in the relationship between history and theology, and pointed out the imperial nature of Indo-European languages among those speakers of languages such as Sinhalese or Japanese. He also told, in this book, of an incident which happened to him in Singapore, where he met a Buddhist monk from Sri Lanka. He told the monk about crusades for Jesus Christ and the monk looked puzzled. "Why do you need to crusade?" asked the monk. The monk indicated that if one felt a need to crusade, then one was not a true disciple. Instead, the monk championed, true to his Buddhist beliefs, the virtue of self-denial.

His last work was Theology and Violence: Towards A Theology of Nonviolent Love, published in Japanese in 2009 by Kyobunkwan, a publishing firm in Tokyo.

== Works ==
- Water Buffalo Theology (1974)
- Pilgrim or Tourist (1974)
- Fifty Meditations (1975)
- No Handle on the Cross: An Asian Meditation on the Crucified Mind. London: SCM Press, 1976.
- Three Mile an Hour God (1980)
- Mount Fuji and Mount Sinai (1985)
