= L. E. Timberlake =

American politician (1896–1973)

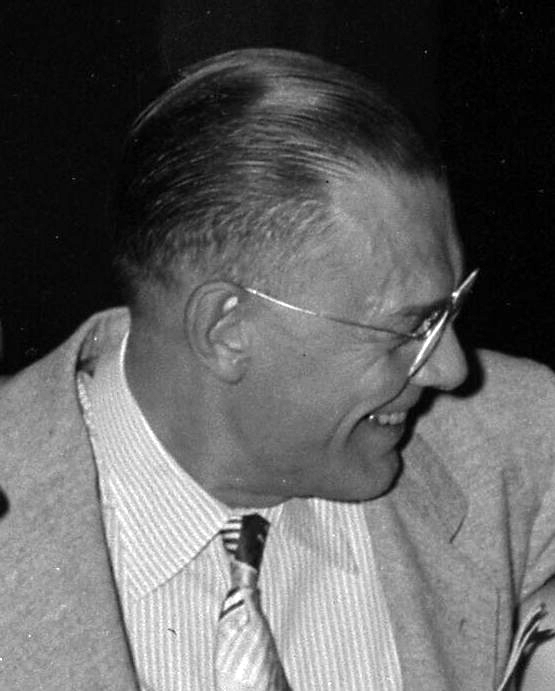
- Timberlake in 1949

President of the Los Angeles City Council
- In office July 1, 1963 – June 30, 1969
- Preceded by: Harold A. Henry
- Succeeded by: John S. Gibson Jr.

Member of the Los Angeles City Council for the 6th district
- In office July 1, 1945 – July 2, 1969
- Preceded by: Earl C. Gay
- Succeeded by: Pat Russell

Personal details
- Born: May 3, 1896 Basingstoke, England
- Died: July 17, 1973 (aged 77) California
- Party: Democratic
- Education: University of Southern California (did not graduate)
- Occupation: Travel bureau owner, railroad employee (former)

Leonard E. "Lee" Timberlake (1896–1973) was a British-born American politician who served as a member of the Los Angeles City Council from 1945 to 1969. Before entering politics, Timberlake was a railroad employee and travel bureau owner.

== Biography ==
Timberlake was born May 3, 1896, in Basingstoke, England, the son of F. and Emily Timberlake. After completing high school, Timberlake took a year of industrial engineering at the University of Southern California. He was a member of the Kiwanis Club and the Los Angeles Breakfast Club. He was a Methodist and a Democrat. He lived in Los Angeles between 1920 and 1923 and also after 1938.

Timberlake began his working career between 1916 and 1920 as a railroad agent for the Canadian National Railway. His succeeding jobs were passenger agent, Union Pacific Railway, 1920–22; accountant, Bingham and Garfield Railway, 1922–23; accountant, Union Pacific, 1923; chief clerk, Nevada Northern Railway, 1923–27; general auditor, Illinois Terminal Railway system, 1927–32. He next went into the travel industry, with a half interest in the Southern California Tourist Bureau, after 1932. Later he was full owner of the agency, which became the largest independent travel bureau in California. He also worked at times for the Kennecott Copper Company and Illinois Power and Light.

His first marriage resulted in two daughters, Betty Strebe and Beverly Watson. His second marriage was on May 7, 1933, to Cynthia Wyatt Mitchell of Atlanta, Georgia. They also had two children, Cynthia Lynn and Carole Ann. They lived at 10210 South Hobart Boulevard in Gramercy Park.

He died July 17, 1973. His last address was Hemet, California.

== City Council ==
Timberlake was one of the longest-serving council members, "The length of service of the 73-year-old council dean is matched only by that of former Councilman John C. Holland, who retired July 1, 1967, at [age] 74," Erwin Baker of the Los Angeles Times wrote when Timberlake announced his retirement in May 1969. As City Council president, Timberlake may have set a record as acting mayor, Baker wrote, because of Mayor Samuel Yorty's extensive travels outside the country.

=== Elections ===
Timberlake first ran for the Los Angeles City Council District 6 seat against the incumbent, Earl C. Gay, in 1943 and lost, 8,841 for Gay to 8,404 for Timberlake. In that election, Gay's campaign raised a question as to why Timberlake had waited until 1940 to become an American citizen, to which Timberlake replied that he did not "deem it necessary to dignify these scurrilous attacks by replying thereto."

In his next try, though, in 1945, Timberlake won a narrow victory over Gay. He was reelected in the primary vote in every election thereafter until his retirement in 1969. In that year the 6th district included the Airport area, Westchester, Baldwin Hills, Hyde Park and Leimert Park and Mar Vista-Venice.

=== Positions ===
Housing, 1952–53. Timberlake was in dispute with Council President Harold A. Henry over many issues, including a controversial $1 million plan to build public housing in Los Angeles (Timberlake being the leader of the prohousing bloc and Henry opposing), with Timberlake disputing many of Henry's rulings from the chair, as council president. One of Timberlake's objections upset Henry so much that in January 1953 he was led to exclaim, "Mr. Timberlake, if you persist in this intolerable situation, there will be ways devised to prevent you!"

FEPC, 1958. He was opposed to establishing a Fair Employment Practices Commission in the city of Los Angeles. The council vote was a tie, 7-7.

Chavez Ravine, 1958. Timberlake locked horns with fellow Council Member John C. Holland over the use of Chavez Ravine as a stadium for the Los Angeles Dodgers, which Timberlake favored and Holland vehemently opposed. Timberlake at one point told Holland in a council meeting that "You are the lowest thing I ever heard of!" He was angry because, he said, Holland had "sent slanted press releases to papers in my district."

Yorty, 1963–65. Timberlake was roundly criticized by Mayor Samuel Yorty when the former, as acting mayor, appointed one of Yorty's bitterest foes, C. Lemoine Blanchard, to the city Airport Commission while Yorty was out of the country, touring Europe. "It is a tragic thing that Timberlake assumed such action while the duly elected mayor is away on a duty trip," Yorty said. Though Timberlake was described as a Yorty opponent, he was later said to have become "increasingly friendly" with the mayor.

Political offices
Preceded by Earl C. Gay	Los Angeles City Council; 6th District; 1945–69	Succeeded by Pat Russell
Preceded by Harold A. Henry	President of the Los Angeles City Council; 1963–69	Succeeded by John S. Gibson Jr.
