= Lewis A. Spengler =

American politician and real estate agent (1872-1959)

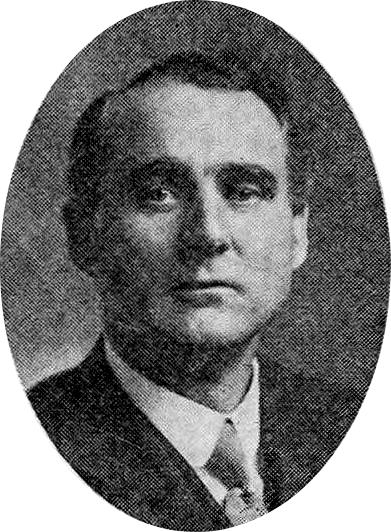
- Spengler c. 1915

Member of the California State Assembly from the 71st district
- In office January 4, 1915 – January 8, 1917
- Preceded by: Elijah A. Emmons
- Succeeded by: Bert L. Farmer

Personal details
- Born: Lewis Arnold Spengler; September 21, 1872 Spencertown, New York, U.S.
- Died: December 6, 1959 (aged 87) Garberville, California, U.S.
- Party: Socialist
- Spouse: Emma (m. 1893)
- Children: Viola; Florence; Lewis
- Education: Common school
- Occupation: Real estate agent

Lewis Arnold Spengler (September 21, 1872 – December 6, 1959) was an American real estate agent and politician who served one term in the California State Assembly for the 71st district from 1915 to 1917. Spengler was one of three Socialists elected to the California State Assembly in 1914, the other two being George W. Downing and Witten William Harris. While in the Assembly, he introduced legislation to establish free employment bureaus across the state. He was defeated for re-election in 1916.
