= James G. McAllister =

American politician

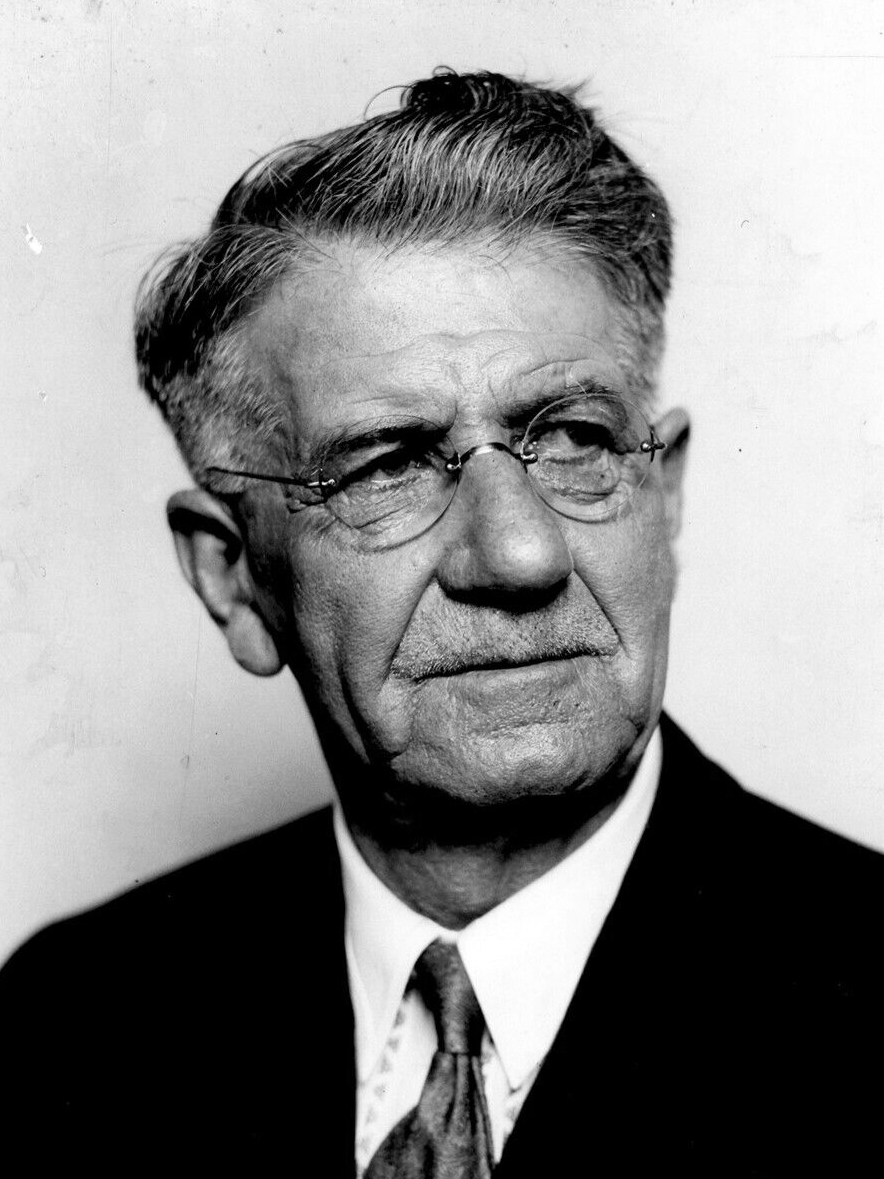

Member of the Los Angeles City Council from the 6th district
- In office August 28, 1928 – June 30, 1933
- Preceded by: Lester R. Rice-Wray
- Succeeded by: Earl C. Gay

Personal details
- Born: December 22, 1860 Salt Lake City
- Died: October 10, 1933 (aged 72) Santa Monica, California

James Goforth McAllister (December 22, 1860 – October 10, 1933) was a 20th-century rancher and miner who was on the Utah Board of Equalization and later was a member of the Los Angeles, California, City Council from 1928 to 1933.

== Biography ==
James G. McAllister was born in Salt Lake City to Mormon pioneer leader John D. T. McAllister and his second wife, Angeline Sophronia Goforth. As a young man, he learned the trade of a carpenter and told of having worked on the construction of the Salt Lake Tabernacle. He then became active in business affairs, with interests in livestock (primarily sheep), mining, and real estate.

In civic matters, McAllister's first official role was as inspector of provisions for Salt Lake City, a position to which he was appointed by mayor Robert N. Baskin in January 1894. This however proved controversial because a previous incumbent, Alma S. Kendall, had received a two-year appointment in 1892 and disputed that the mayor had the power to remove him. Although McAllister was confirmed by the city council, which considered the post vacant, ultimately the territorial supreme court ruled that his appointment was void. Meanwhile he served as a delegate to Utah's Republican Party convention that year, as with the passage of an enabling act that would result in statehood in 1896, Utah's previously unique political culture reorganized itself along national party lines.

McAllister would later serve as a member of the Utah Board of Equalization from 1911 to 1913. The home he had built for himself in 1915, located in Salt Lake City near the University of Utah, is on the National Register of Historic Places.

In 1920 McAllister moved to Los Angeles, California, where he engaged in the real-estate business. He lived at 1467 West 49th Street in that city. He died at the age of 72 in Santa Monica of an "abdominal ailment" on October 10, 1933, leaving his widow, Emily M. McCallister, and a daughter, Mrs. Roy Avery. A Christian Science funeral service was held, and the body was taken to Salt Lake City for interment.

== Los Angeles City Council ==
=== Elections ===
As the president of the South Los Angeles Property Owners' Protective League, McAllister entered his name in the 6th District race in the southwestern part of the city when Councilman Lester R. Rice-Wray faced a recall election in 1928, brought about by Rice-Wray's support for a Slauson Avenue storm-drain project that would have levied taxes on thousands of district property owners. Rice-Wray lost his seat, and McAllister was chosen in his place. He was returned to the council in 1929 and 1931 but was defeated in June 1933 by Earl C. Gay.

=== Activities ===
During his council terms, McAllister was active in:

1930 Urging an investigation of streetcar service provided by the Los Angeles Railway, which he said deteriorated markedly even after fares were increased.

1930 Unsuccessfully opposing the allocation of funds to make a study of leveling Bunker Hill, which, it was said, "stands as a hindrance to traffic and a bar to development in the northwestern downtown territory."

1931 Voting in favor of appealing a judge's order to end racial segregation in city-operated swimming pools. The pools had previously been restricted by race to certain days or hours. The vote to appeal lost by 8-6. An appeal would have delayed or ended desegregation.

1932 Proposing that the city abandon its municipal airport "because the figures demonstrate that the operation of the port is too expensive and a luxury for the citizens and taxpayers. . . . Private enterprise in this city has been and is taking care of our aerial needs, and no municipal subsidy is required." The city had leased Mines Field and renamed it the Municipal Airport in October 1928, with McAllister voting against the plan. "Previously, a bond issue for acquisition of an airport had been rejected by the voters."

1932 Warring on "lien sharks" who snapped up properties within the city when the owners, cash poor during the Great Depression, were forced to allow assessment bonds to default. He wanted the owners to be "defended by the City Attorney, City Prosecutor and Public Defender," with "criminal proceedings" perhaps being instituted.

1932 Seeking a probe of possible favoritism toward laid-off city workers in the distribution of financial aid under the provisions of a relief bond issue approved by the voters to help the unemployed.

Preceded by Lester R. Rice-Wray	Los Angeles City Council; 6th District; 1928–33	Succeeded by Earl C. Gay
