= John S. Gibson Jr. =

American politician

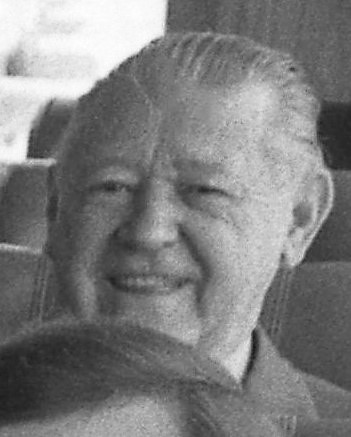

President of the Los Angeles City Council
- In office July 1, 1953 – June 30, 1961
- Preceded by: Harold A. Henry
- Succeeded by: Harold A. Henry
- In office July 1, 1969 – June 30, 1977
- Preceded by: L. E. Timberlake
- Succeeded by: John Ferraro

President Pro Tempore of the Los Angeles City Council
- In office July 1, 1967 – June 30, 1969
- Preceded by: Thomas D. Shepard
- Succeeded by: Robert Stevenson

Member of the Los Angeles City Council for the 15th district
- In office 1951–1981
- Preceded by: George H. Moore
- Succeeded by: Joan Milke Flores

Mayor of Geneseo
- In office 1923–1924

Personal details
- Born: August 11, 1902 Geneseo, Kansas, U.S.
- Died: April 22, 1987 (aged 84) Los Angeles, California, U.S.
- Party: Democratic
- Spouse: Mina Workman (m. 1923; died 1978)
- Children: 2
- Education: Geneseo High School
- Alma mater: University of Kansas; American Institute of Banking

John S. Gibson Jr. (August 11, 1902 – April 22, 1987) was an American politician, whose career spanned many decades and two states. A member of the Democratic Party from San Pedro, Gibson served on the Los Angeles City Council for the 15th district from 1951 and 1981, and did two lengthy stints as its president. Earlier in his life, Gibson's tenure as Mayor of Geneseo, Kansas made him the youngest elected mayor in the nation at the time.

Despite being politically powerful in San Pedro, Gibson ran at least three times unsuccessfully for other offices. In 1957, Gibson ran for Mayor of Los Angeles, but did not qualify for the ballot. He ran for Los Angeles County Assessor in 1962 and for the United States House of Representatives in 1968.

== Early life and education ==
Gibson was born on August 11, 1902, in Geneseo, Kansas, the son of John S. Gibson of Constantine, Michigan, and Flora Dix Gibson of Lynn, Massachusetts, Gibson graduated from Geneseo High School and the University of Kansas.

=== Mayor of Geneseo, Kansas ===
After high school, he worked in his father's bank and at age 21 became the mayor of the small town of Geneseo, Kansas, the youngest municipal executive at that time ever to serve in the United States. "On the second floor of City Hall was the council and the judge's chambers," he told a reporter in 1975. "When the judge died I served in his place for about a year because I was also the mayor."

== Career ==
Gibson moved with his wife and children to California in 1926 or 1927, where he worked for his father-in-law's Long Beach dairy for a year before relocating to San Pedro, Los Angeles in 1928. He graduated from the American Institute of Banking and became president of the Citizens Bank there in 1930 and a general contractor in 1941.

=== Philanthropy ===
In 1951 he was on the board of the San Pedro YMCA, director of the Pacific Southwest Region of Youth for Christ, chairman of the board of the First Baptist Church of San Pedro, treasurer of the Harbor Association of Evangelicals and a member of the Christian Businessmen's Association. He founded California's first Boys Club in San Pedro. He was a hunter and fisherman and, as a council member, regularly sponsored a fishing derby at the Los Angeles Harbor for local children.

== Los Angeles City Council (1951–1981) ==
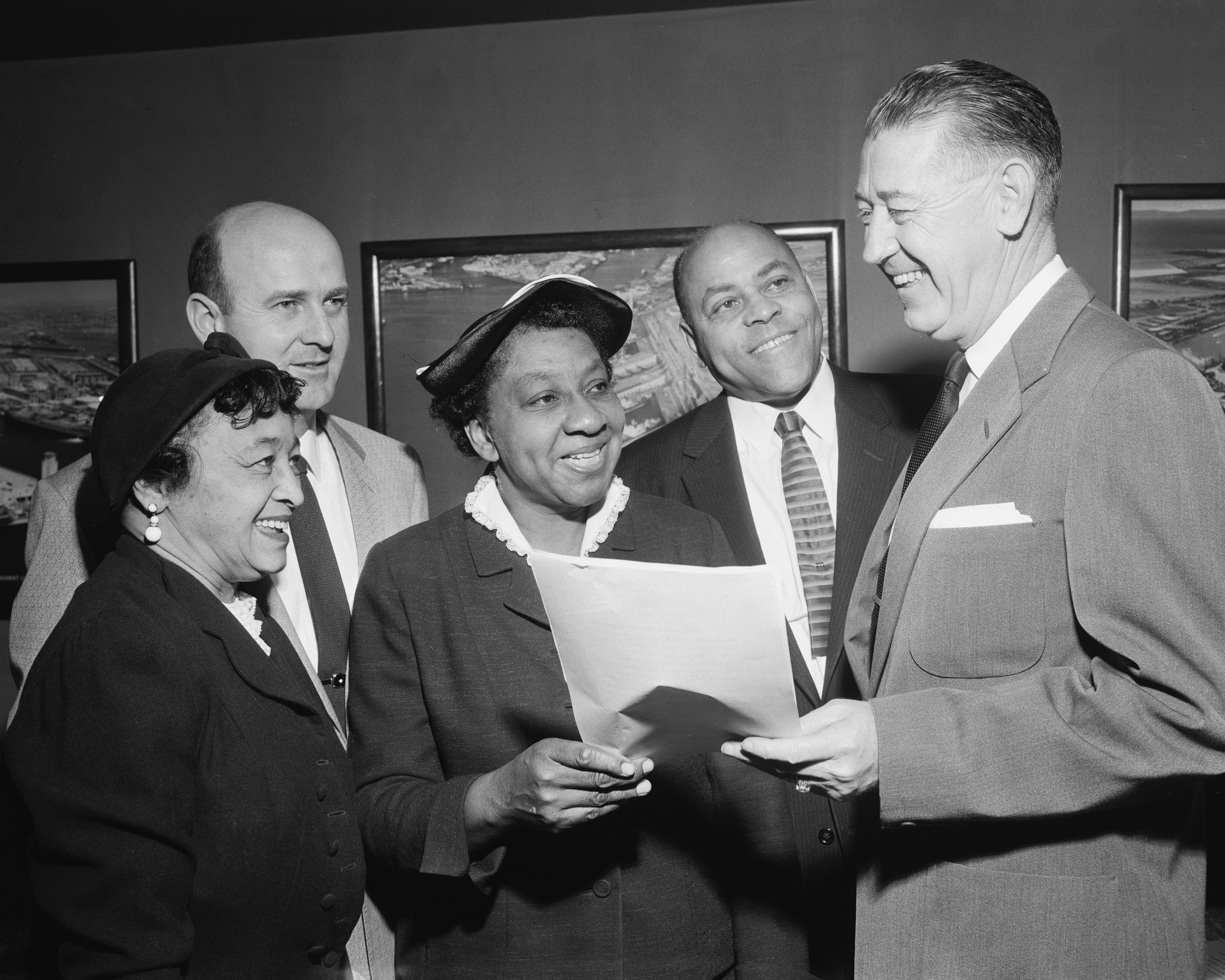
Gibson during Negro History Week resolution, 1958.

=== Elections ===
In 1951 Gibson successfully challenged George H. Moore, the incumbent, in Los Angeles City Council District 15, winning by 10,555 votes to 9,514 in the final vote. Pat Russell tried unsuccessfully to unseat Gibson as council president in 1975.

In the 1977 election, the Municipal Elections Committee of Los Angeles (MECLA), a homosexual-rights group, put $5,000 into the campaign of Jim Stanberry, enough to force Gibson into an unaccustomed runoff election. Gibson responded to this unusual challenge by attacking Stanberry for accepting the money and for his membership in the left-wing Peace and Freedom Party. In the final vote, Gibson won with 2,748 votes to Stanberry's 1,123.

Gibson held the third-longest incumbency of any Los Angeles City Council member—30 years, after Ernani Bernardi's 32 years and John Ferraro's 35 years.

=== Positions ===
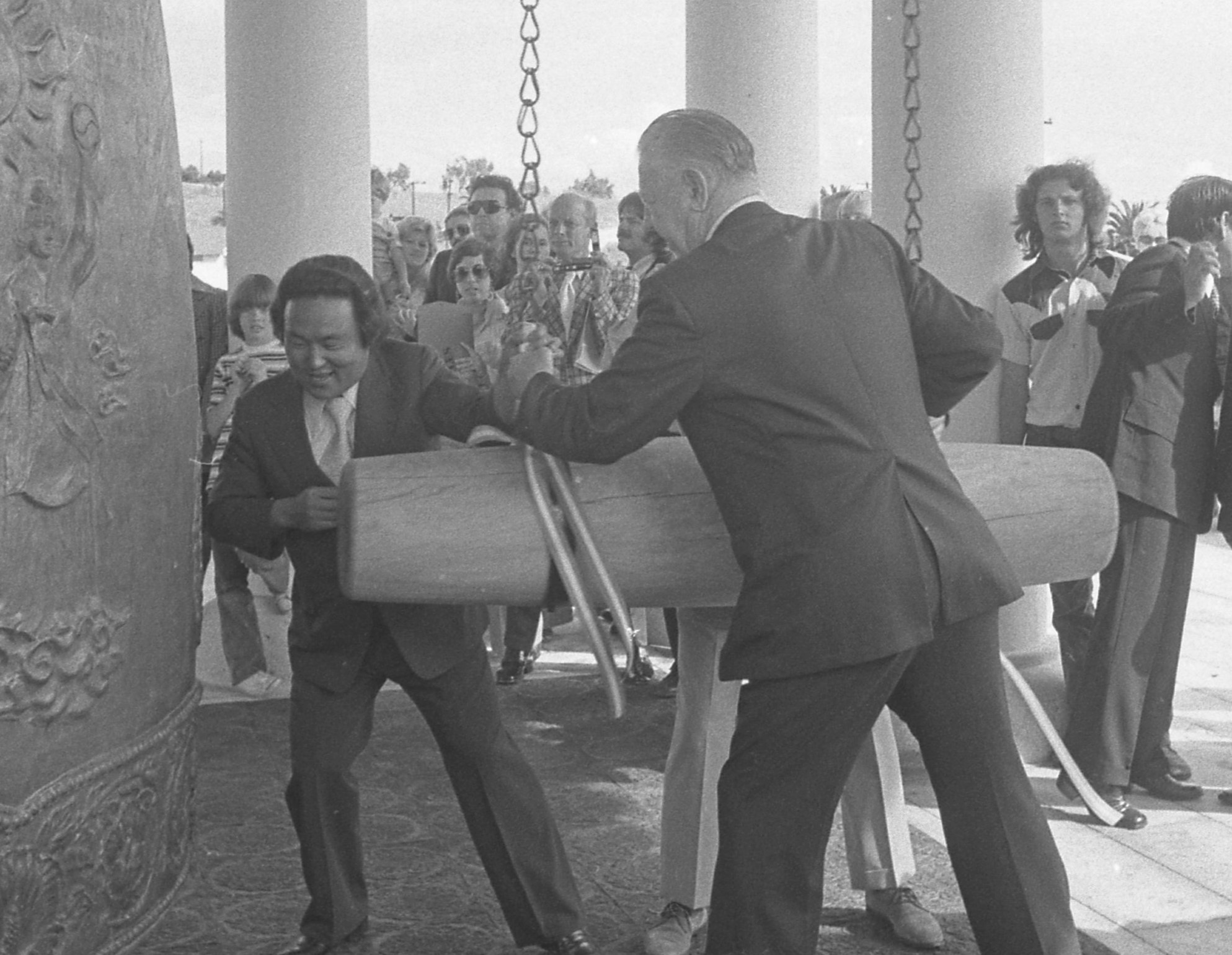
Gibson ringing the Korean Bell of Friendship in 1976.

Though he often described himself as a "conservative Democrat," when he was first named president of the City Council in 1953 he was identified as a part of the "so-called liberal bloc," and he appointed other such councilmen—like Gordon Hahn, who broke a 7–7 tie to vote for Gibson as president—to chair the most important committees of the council. He was said to be "a liberal joining a very conservative council."

He "loathed laws and regulations that he felt hampered free enterprise, and his pro-business, pro-growth views often angered environmentalists and tenants seeking protection through rent control and condominium conversion ordinances."

Gibson was frequently described as a "nice guy," with an "easygoing, affable manner" and a "folksy sense of humor," but he could also be cantankerous and vindictive, the Los Angeles Times remarked editorially, as when he stripped Pat Russell and Marvin Braude of their committee positions in 1975 and "assign[ed] them to obscure and unimportant panels" after the two of them had opposed Gibson's bid for reelection as council president.

He was a self-described religious fundamentalist who "made no attempt to separate his religious beliefs from his politics." He admired Billy Graham and said he never attended a council meeting without first saying a prayer. He said his favorite Bible verse was Galatians 6:2-3, "Bear one another's burdens, and so fulfill the law of Christ. For if any one thinks he is something, when he is nothing, he deceives himself" a quotation read to him by his mother when he became mayor of Geneseo, Kansas.

He blocked a community plan for San Pedro for nearly twenty years "because he opposed government-mandated controls on growth." In 1973 he agreed with Councilman Billy G. Mills that the city was following planning policies that ignored housing for the poor and that would result in "larger inner-city ghettos." He objected to policies that allowed large lots in more affluent parts of town but, he said, concentrated apartments in the poorer sections.

He was the only City Council member who did not use a private office but preferred to work "elbow-to-elbow with his staff in a large City Hall room, generally in his shirt sleeves."

In 1975 he said he was upset by laws that would reduce penalties for possession of marijuana. He added:

Permissiveness is destroying the morality of the young people and contributes to rising crime. I don't claim to be sinless, but as long as I breathe a breath I shall do my best to at least call people's attention to these matters.

Gibson played a key role in bringing the Dodgers baseball club from Brooklyn to Chavez Ravine in Los Angeles.

=== Presidency ===
Gibson set a record of sixteen years as City Council president (1953–61 and 1969–77), leading his colleagues to designate him as president emeritus when he retired from the council in 1981, the only person ever honored in that way. He was thus acting mayor when Norris Poulson or Sam Yorty was out of the city.

With Yorty out of town on a European trip, it fell to Gibson to deal with the city's response to the Watts Riots of 1965. He was also left to handle a 1973 energy crisis. His "calm handling of those crises won him respect—and an unofficial title as the city's 'panic mayor.' "

He at one point ordered the locking of exits from the council chamber and the posting of police guards to prevent the possible breaking of a quorum.

== Personal life ==
Gibson was married on January 16, 1923, to Mina Workman of Lyons, Kansas. They had two daughters, Marlyn Irene Buehler and Florene Dix Blackwelder.

Gibson suffered a heart attack in 1974, but "it was his wife's death in 1978 that seemed to take the biggest toll." He died at his home on April 22, 1987, when he was recuperating from hip surgery. Funeral services were held at the First Baptist Church in San Pedro, and interment was at Green Hills Memorial Park on the Palos Verdes Peninsula.

== Legacy ==
In his honor, several landmarks in the 15th district bear his name. In 1973, the council unanimously voted to name a boulevard near the Port of Los Angeles after him. In 1977 a small park in front of the Los Angeles Maritime Museum at the corner of S. Harbor and 6th street was given his name, and in 1984, the municipal building ("city hall") of San Pedro was also named for him.

Political offices
| Preceded by George H. Moore | Los Angeles City Council; 15th District; 1951–1981 | Succeeded by Joan Milke Flores |
| Preceded by Harold A. Henry | President of the Los Angeles City Council; 1953–1961; 1969–1977 | Succeeded by Harold A. Henry |
| Preceded by L. E. Timberlake | President of the Los Angeles City Council; 1953–1961; 1969–1977 | Succeeded by John Ferraro |
| Preceded by Thomas D. Shepard | President Pro Tempore of the Los Angeles City Council; 1967-1969 | Succeeded by Robert Stevenson |
