= 1957 Los Angeles mayoral election =

- April 2, 1957
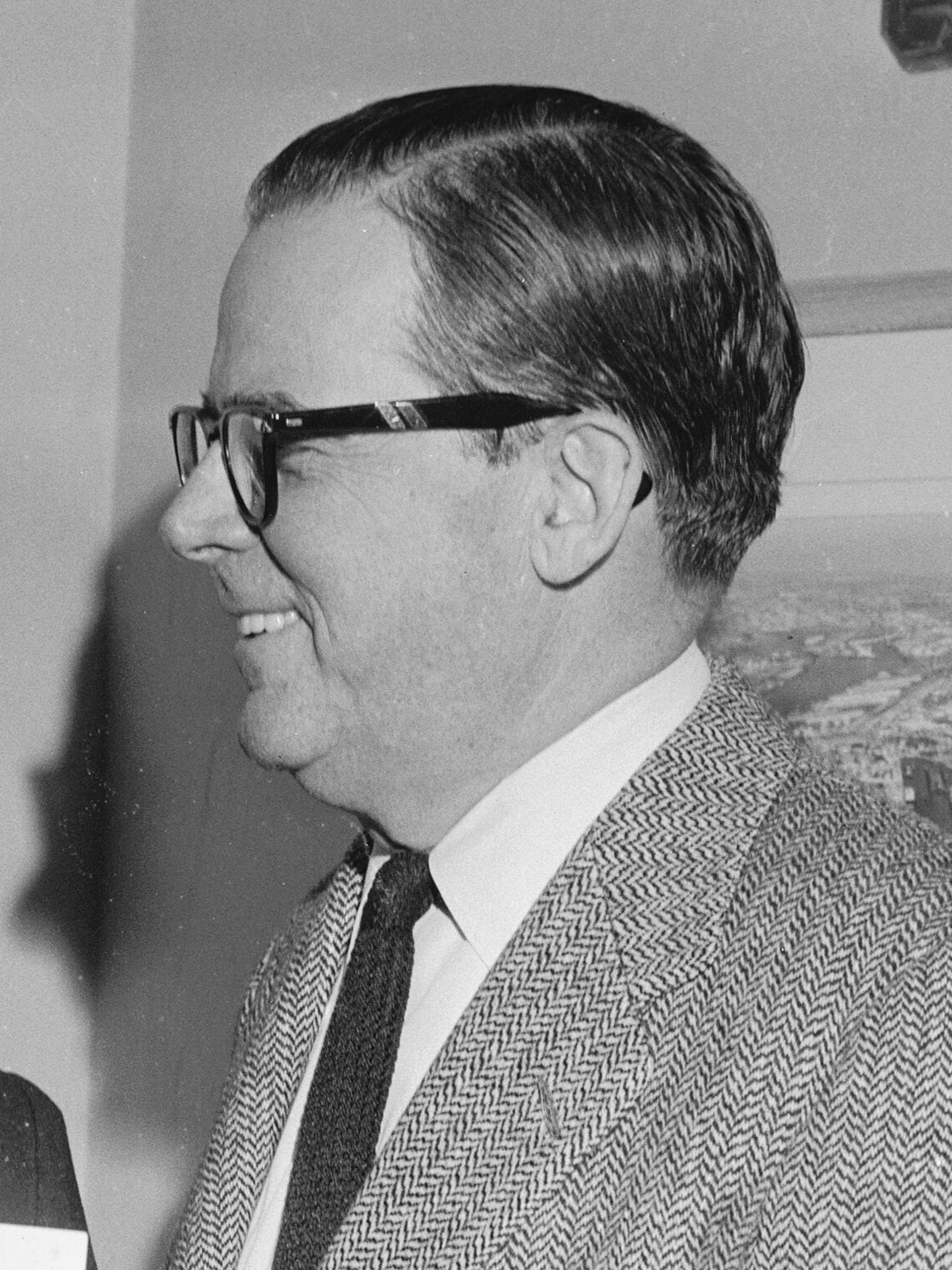

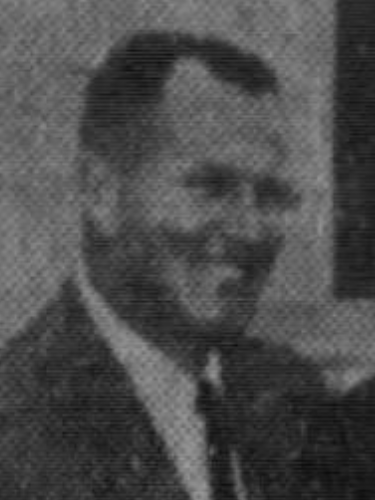

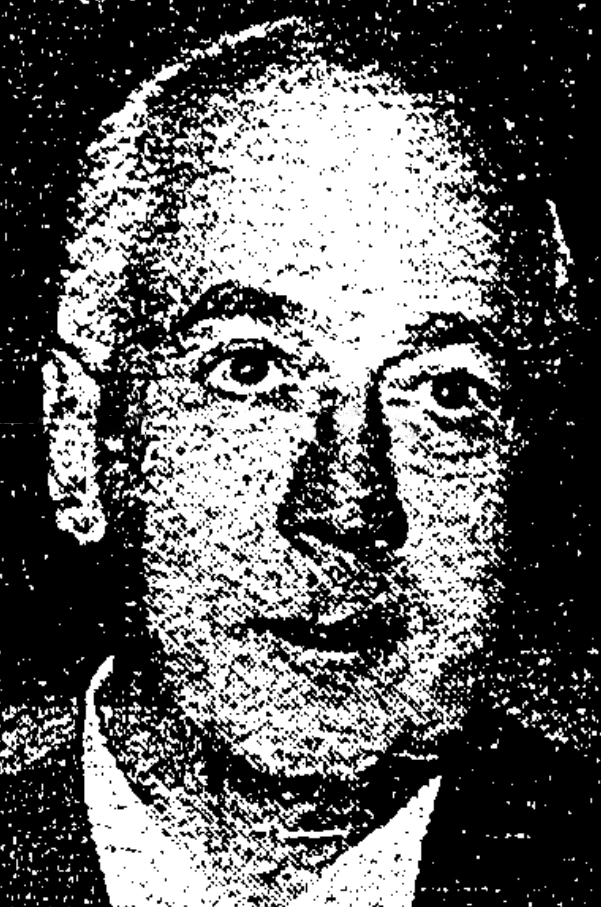
Candidate	Norris Poulson	Robert Yeakel	John M. Ennis
Popular vote	311,970	141,306	44,112
Percentage	60.80%	27.54%	8.60%
Mayor before election
Norris Poulson
Elected Mayor
Norris Poulson

The 1957 Los Angeles mayoral election took place on April 2, 1957. Incumbent Norris Poulson was re-elected with minimal opposition.

Poulson initially stated that he would retire from the office before changing his mind and filing for re-election; Kenneth Hahn, John S. Gibson Jr., and Don Belding all withdrew after Poulson made his announcement. Four candidates still ran to defeat Poulson, but Poulson won outright in the primary election.

Municipal elections in California, including mayor of Los Angeles, are officially nonpartisan; candidates' party affiliations do not appear on the ballot.

== Candidates ==
- Errol Banks
- William Carpenter
- John M. Ennis
- Norris Poulson, incumbent mayor since 1953
- Robert Yeakel

=== Withdrew ===
- Don Belding, advertising executive
- John S. Gibson Jr., president of the Los Angeles City Council
- Kenneth Hahn, member of the Los Angeles County Board of Supervisors

== Results ==
Los Angeles mayoral general election, April 2, 1957
Candidate	Votes	%
Norris Poulson (incumbent)	311,970	60.80
Robert Yeakel	141,306	27.54
John M. Ennis	44,112	8.60
William Carpenter	8,609	1.68
Errol Banks	7,094	1.38
Total votes	513,091	100.00
