= Earl C. Gay =

American politician

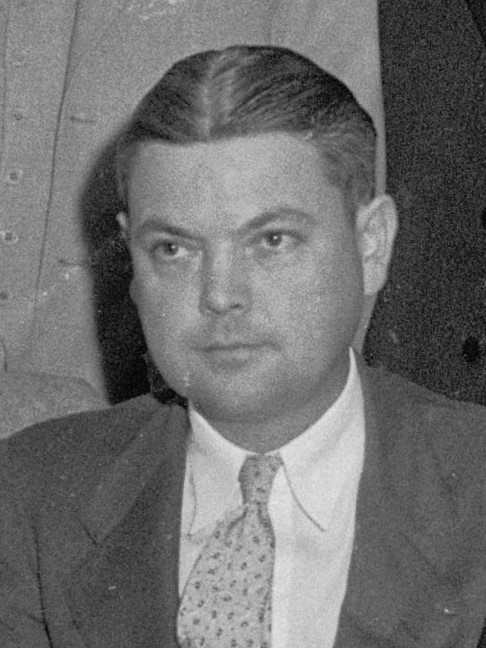
- Gay in 1935

Member of the Los Angeles City Council from the 6th district
- In office July 1, 1933 – June 30, 1945
- Preceded by: James G. McAllister
- Succeeded by: L. E. Timberlake

Personal details
- Born: December 8, 1902; Long Beach, California
- Died: February 6, 1972 (aged 69); Torrance, California
- Political party: Republican
- Spouse: Irene Elizabeth Constable (m. 1926)
- Children: 1
- Occupation: Registered pharmacist

Earl C. Gay (1902–1972) was an American registered pharmacist, who served as a member of the Los Angeles City Council between 1933 and 1945.

== Biography ==
Gay was born December 8, 1902, in Long Beach, California, the son of Ellsworth Gay and Elba W. Bain Gay. His siblings were Bernice Windisch, Louise Ferguson, Maude Wilmans or Williams and Robert W. Gay. He attended Florence Avenue Grammar School, Jefferson High School and Manual Arts High School, both in Los Angeles, after which he received a degree from the Henry Coleman School of Pharmacy at the University of Southern California. He managed the Thompson and Thompson Drug Company and the Morgan Drug Company. His hobbies were golf and bowling. In 1937 he was living at 5832 South Van Ness Avenue in the Chesterfield Square neighborhood.

He was married on October 8, 1926, to Irene Elizabeth Constable of Los Angeles. They had one daughter, Corinne Elizabeth (later Shero).

He was a member of the Southside, Angeles Mesa and Crenshaw chambers of commerce, the Southwest Boosters Club and the Civic Interest League, as well as the International Footprinters Association, Native Sons of the Golden West, Masons and the Shrine. He attended the Chesterfield Square Methodist Church.

He died February 6, 1972, in a Torrance convalescent hospital. Burial was in Forest Lawn Memorial Park, Glendale.

== City Council ==
In 1933, Los Angeles City Council District 6 covered the southwest part of the city, with the northern boundary at Vernon Avenue, the southern at Century Boulevard, the western at La Brea Avenue and the eastern at Vermont Avenue. Gay ran that year against incumbent Council Member James G. McAllister and was elected, 12,131-11,856. He was reelected easily in 1935 over Lottie E. Barkow, the End Poverty in California candidate, and was also reelected in every biennial vote from 1937 to 1943. He lost in 1945, however, to L.E. Timberlake by a close vote, 8,841 to 8,404.

Gay survived a recall attempt in 1938, sponsored by Robert Noble, a pension advocate.

The 6th District councilman was "an archenemy of reform" and was despised by Mayor Fletcher Bowron. However, he survived repeated political assaults from Bowron and chaired the Police and Fire Committee and the Finance Committee." He was on Bowron's "purge list" in the 1939 election. After Bowron referred to himself in a radio address as the "lone wolf" of City Hall, Gay and fellow Council Member Edward L. Thrasher set a wolf trap outside the door of the mayor's suite a joke.

In 1943 he and three other council members unsuccessfully opposed granting a permit to Seaboard Oil Company for slant oil drilling under Elysian Park from a site near Riverside Drive.

Preceded by James G. McAllister	Los Angeles City Council; 6th District; 1933–45	Succeeded by L.E. Timberlake
