= George W. Downing =

American politician and attorney (1869-1948)

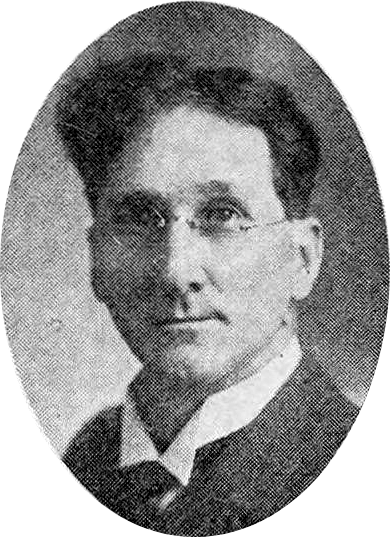
- Downing c. 1915

Manhattan Beach City Judge
- In office January 5, 1929 – November 22, 1948
- Preceded by: Llewellyn Price
- Succeeded by: D. Clifford Higgins

Member of the California State Assembly from the 73rd district
- In office January 4, 1915 – January 8, 1917
- Preceded by: Howard A. Peairs
- Succeeded by: Henry H. Yonkin

Personal details
- Born: George Washington Downing; February 22, 1869 Minnesota, U.S.
- Died: November 22, 1948 (aged 79) Manhattan Beach, California, U.S.
- Resting place: Pacific Crest Cemetery
- Party: Socialist
- Other political affiliations: Populist (1900)
- Spouses: Agnes; Laura
- Children: George Jr.
- Education: University of Minnesota
- Occupation: Attorney

George Washington Downing (February 22, 1869 – November 22, 1948) was an American attorney and politician who served one term in the California State Assembly for the 73rd district from 1915 to 1917. He was previously City Attorney of Perham, Minnesota, and later served as Manhattan Beach City Judge from 1929 until his death.

Downing was one of three Socialists elected to the California State Assembly in 1914, the other two being Witten William Harris and Lewis A. Spengler. Prior to his election, Downing had been a candidate in several races; in 1900, he ran for Otter Tail County Attorney as a Populist; in 1904, he ran again as a Socialist; in 1906, he ran for California Attorney General; in 1908, he ran for Los Angeles County Superior Court Judge; in 1911, he ran for Los Angeles City Auditor on the same ticket as Job Harriman; and in 1912 he ran for State Assembly in the same district he would win two years later. After he lost re-election in 1916, he returned to his law practice, and in 1924 was nominated as a presidential elector for Progressive Party candidate Robert La Follette.
