= George H. Moore =

American politician

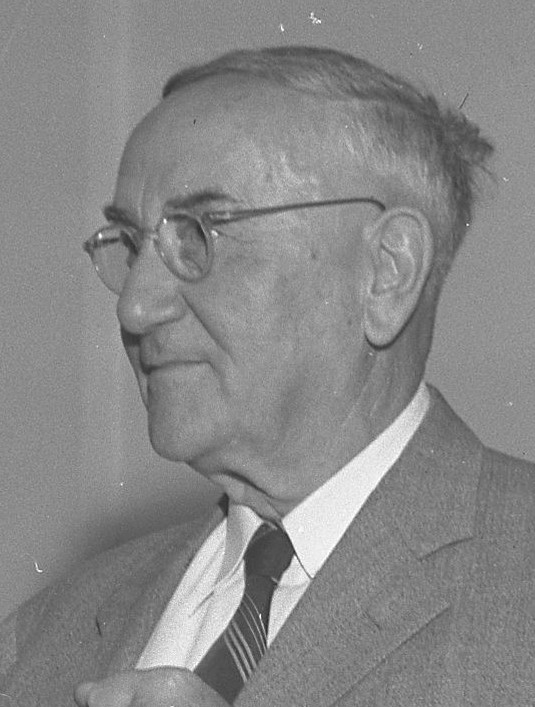
- Moore in 1946

Member of the Los Angeles City Council for the 15th district
- In office July 1, 1943 – June 30, 1951
- Preceded by: Wilder W. Hartley
- Succeeded by: John S. Gibson Jr.

President of the Los Angeles City Council
- In office July 1, 1945 – June 30, 1947
- Preceded by: Robert L. Burns
- Succeeded by: Harold A. Henry

Personal details
- Born: November 4, 1871; San Juan Bautista, California
- Died: September 16, 1958 (aged 86); Long Beach, California
- Political party: Democratic

George H. Moore (November 4, 1871 – September 16, 1958), an attorney and a judge who was active in civic affairs of the Los Angeles Harbor region, was district attorney of San Benito County and a member of the Los Angeles City Council from 1943 to 1951.

== Biography ==
Moore was born November 4, 1871, in San Juan Bautista, California, the son of George Augustine Moore of North Anson, Maine, and Emma S Carr Moore of California. He earned his law degree from the University of California, Berkeley, and was a practicing attorney from 1902 to 1929. He was executive secretary of the Wilmington, California. Chamber of Commerce from 1931 to 1943 and also president of the Roman Forum organization.

He was married on November 30, 1893, to Malvina Willson. Their children were Helen Moore, George Augustine Moore, Willson C. Moore, Isabelle Moore Yocum and Dr. Malvina Moore Taylor.

Moore, 86, died September 16, 1958, in a Long Beach, California, convalescent hospital. Besides his wife and children, he left a brother, Winfield R. Moore of South Gate. Burial was in San Juan Bautista Cemetery.

== Public service ==
Moore was a Judge of Lower Court from 1917 to 1918 and district attorney of San Benito County from 1917 to 1927. He was also city attorney for Hollister, California. He moved to Wilmington in 1928 and was appointed in 1939 by fellow Democrat and Los Angeles Mayor Fletcher Bowron to the Harbor Commission, where he served until he was elected to the City Council in 1943. He was also chairman of a group that established Fremont State Park. After leaving the City Council, he became a member of the boards of directors of the California Port Authority, the Pacific Coast Port Authority and the American Port Authorities. He was also a member of the city's Public Utilities and Transportation Commission until 1955, when he resigned for health reasons.

=== City Council ===
==== Elections ====
Moore ran against the incumbent, Wilder W. Hartley, in 1943 in Los Angeles City Council District 15 and ousted him in the primary election. He was reelected in 1945, and his colleagues chose him as City Council president in July of that year. Moore was reelected to the council in 1947 and 1949 but was defeated in 1951 by John S. Gibson Jr.

==== Positions ====
Harbor, 1945. Eugene Overton, president of the Board of Harbor Commissioners, clashed with Moore over charges by the latter that there had been "irregularities" in connection with the conduct of harbor affairs.

Unions, 1947. Supporters of G. Vernon Bennett, backing Bennett for the council presidency, charged Moore with being dominated by the Congress of Industrial Organizations, and members of the rival American Federation of Labor leaped to defend Moore.

Animals, 1950. Moore, along with Councilman George P. Cronk, led the opposition to repealing an ordinance that permitted medical experimentation with animals in the city shelter until military authorities and medical groups could be contacted for their opinion. He told the council:

We are in a war [in Korea] and when this ordinance was passed some months ago representatives of the military, including the Atomic Energy Commission, appeared before this body and favored animal experimentation. I am not going to vote for repeal until I hear from them.

| Preceded by Wilder W. Hartley | Los Angeles City Council; 15th District; 1943–1951 | Succeeded by John S. Gibson Jr. |
| Preceded by Robert L. Burns | President of the Los Angeles City Council; 1945–1947 | Succeeded by Harold A. Henry |
