= Lester R. Rice-Wray =

American politician (1871–1943)

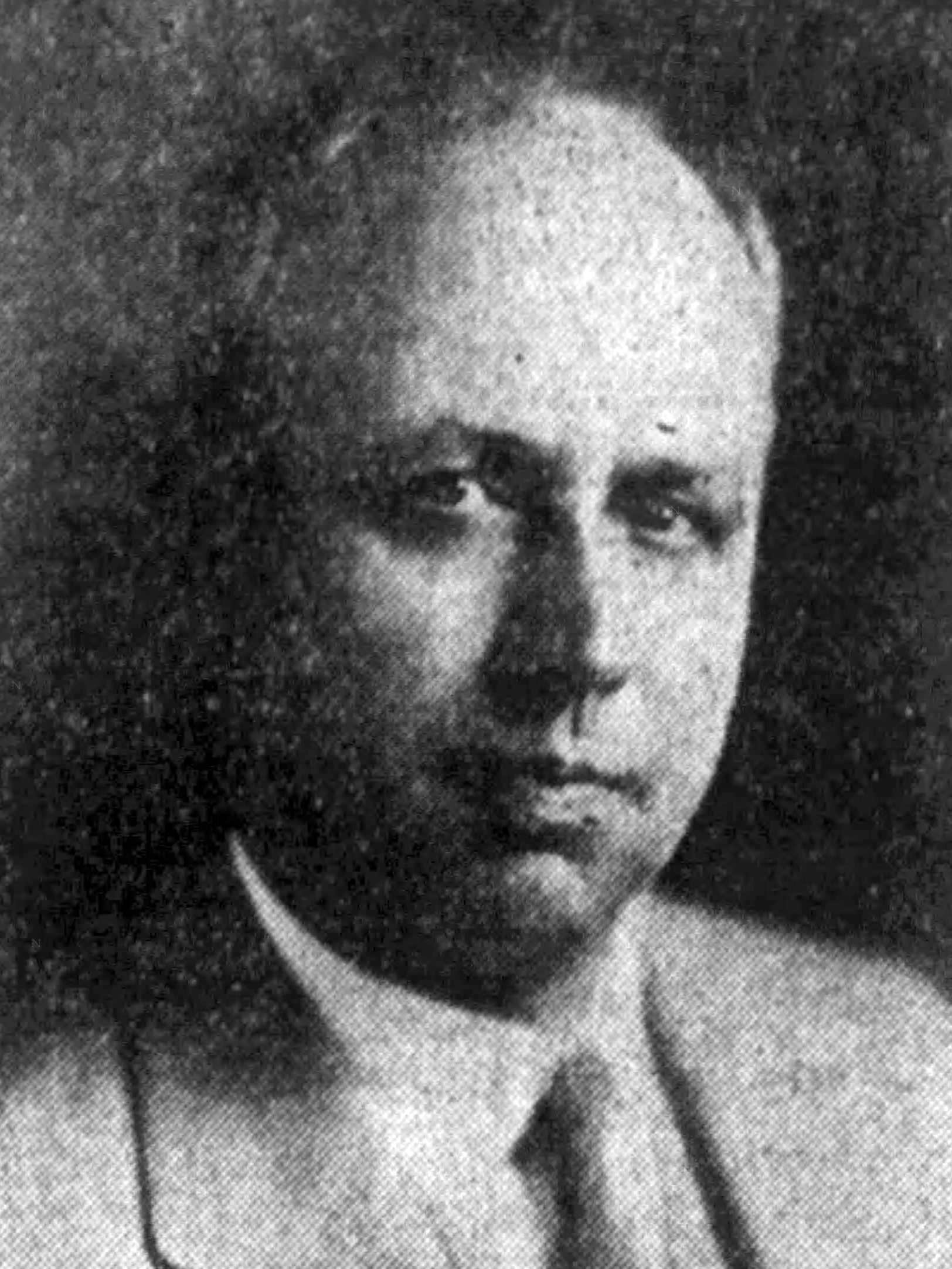
- Rice-Wray in 1928

Member of the Los Angeles City Council from the 6th district
- In office July 1, 1927 – August 28, 1928
- Preceded by: Edward E. Moore
- Succeeded by: James G. McAllister

Personal details
- Born: August 1, 1871 Missouri, U.S.
- Died: August 4, 1943 (aged 72) Los Angeles, California, U.S.
- Spouse: Minerva Chowning (m. 1906; died 1929) Nellie Rice-Wray (div. 1935)

Lester R. Rice-Wray (August 1, 1871 – August 4, 1943) was a professor of mathematics at the University of Denver who later was elected to the City Council in Los Angeles, California, and was the first councilman there to face a recall election under the 1925 city charter.

== Biography ==
Rice-Wray was born in Missouri and educated in both public and private schools. He was a licensed teacher at the age of 16. At the outbreak of World War I, he worked in Washington, D.C., to "straighten out the inefficiencies of the American Express Railway Company in the District of Columbia, which was a center of supply distribution." He moved to Los Angeles in 1920 and became president of the Greater Slauson-Avenue Improvement Association.

He was married. His first wife died at the age of 53 on January 28, 1929. His second wife, Nellie, obtained a divorce in November 1935 on the grounds that her husband struck her and refused to support her properly and that he was abusive and drank to excess.

== City Council ==
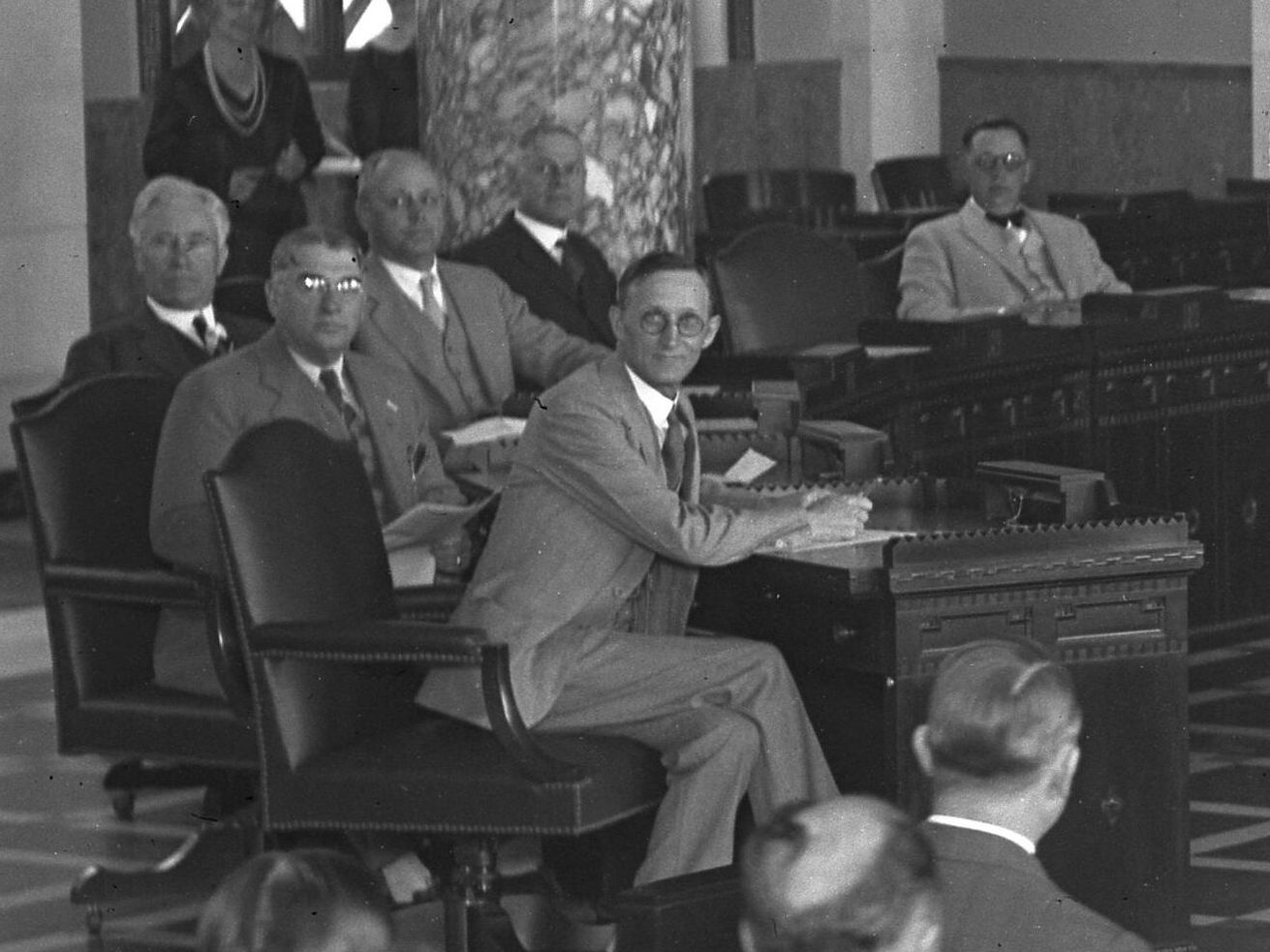
Rice-Wray (third from left) in the Los Angeles City Council in 1928.

=== Elections ===
Rice-Wray defeated 6th District Council Member Edward E. Moore in 1927 with the backing of Mayor George E. Cryer and political boss Kent Parrot, but was quickly enveloped in controversy over his support of a massive Slauson Avenue storm drain project. Petitioners for a recall election charged him with ignoring the wishes of his constituents opposed to the project, which affected some 30,000 property owners and for which they would be taxed. The area was later described as 50 million square feet "bounded by Slauson Avenue, extending into the city of Inglewood and Van Ness avenue to Gramercy Place." In the resulting August 1928 election, Rice-Wray was recalled from office by a vote of 10,168 to 5,872. James G. McAllister was elected to succeed him. He was the first City Council member to face a recall election under the 1925 City Charter.

Afterward, a new electoral possibility opened for Rice-Wray, the transfer of the 11th District from Downtown to the coast region, including Venice and Palms." There was no incumbent, so Rice-Wray ran for the vacancy in 1929, but he was soundly defeated in the final by J.C. Barthel, 11,410 votes to 6,647.

=== Council activity ===
While in the council, Rice-Wray was fined $25 (equivalent to $339 in 2013) by Superior Judge Leonard Wilson for having sent the judge a letter urging quick action on a lawsuit involving the removal of sanitariums from the Mar Vista area. He apologized to the judge for his zealousness, but Wilson nevertheless held the council member in contempt and imposed the fine.

== Electoral history ==
Electoral history of Thomas F. Cooke
Year	Office		Party	Primary			General			Result	Swing	Ref.
Year	Office		Party	Total	%	P.	Total	%	P.	Result	Swing	Ref.
1927	Los Angeles City Council	6th	Nonpartisan	2,642	22.69%	2nd	8,327	63.64%	1st	Won	N/A	
1928	Los Angeles City Council	6th	Nonpartisan	5,872	36.61%	2nd	5,776	35.39%	2nd	Lost	N/A	
1929	Los Angeles City Council	11th	Nonpartisan	3,054	22.05%	1st	6,637	36.78%	2nd	Lost	N/A	
1931	Los Angeles City Council	11th	Nonpartisan	120	1.06%	14th	Did not advance			Lost	N/A	

Preceded by Edward E. Moore	Los Angeles City Council; 6th District; 1927–28	Succeeded by James G. McAllister
