= James G. McAllister House =

Historic house in Salt Lake City, Utah, U.S.

- U.S. National Register of Historic Places
- U.S. Historic district – Contributing property
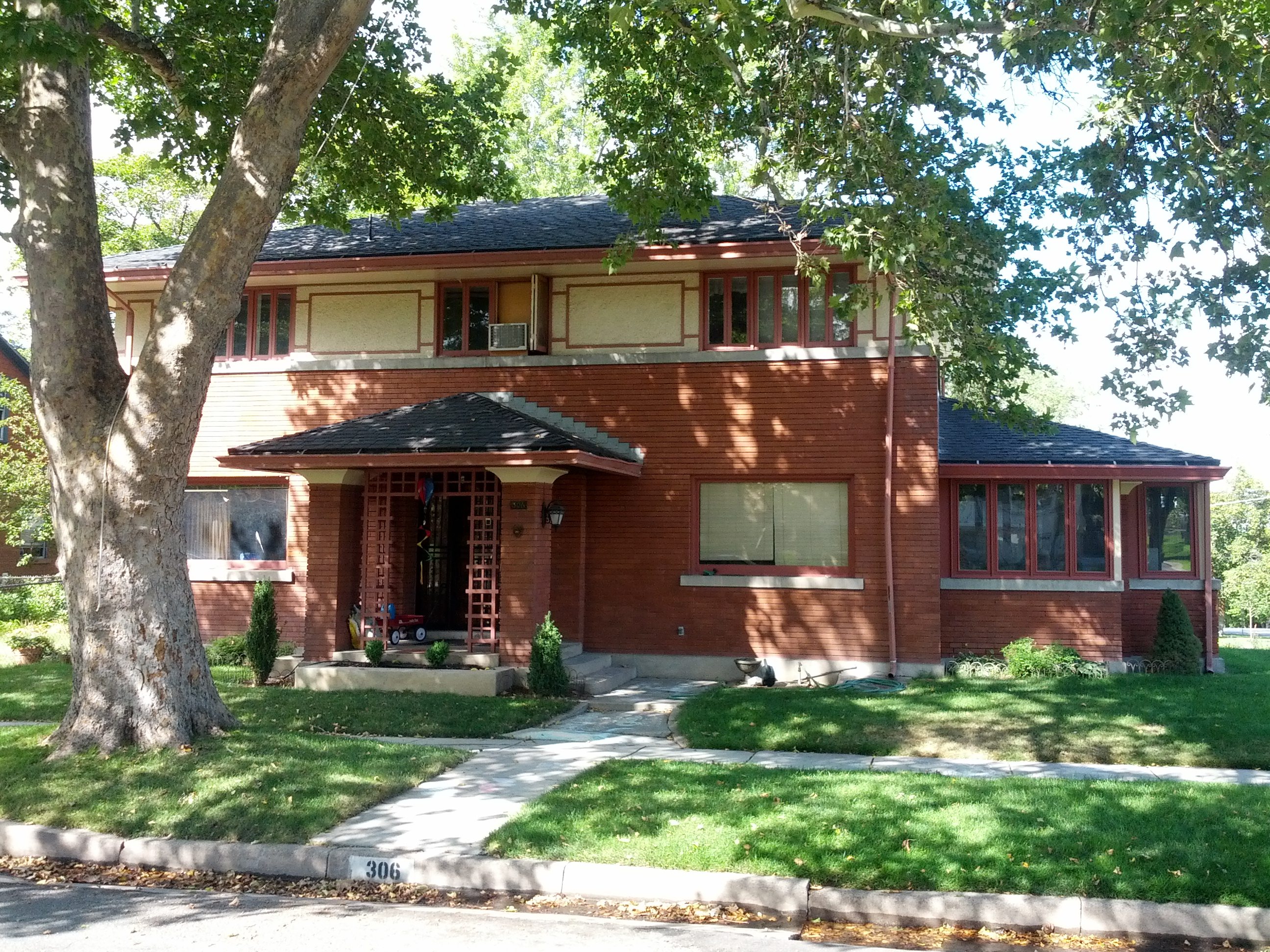
- James G. McAllister House, September 2013

- Location within Utah Location within the United States
- Location: 306 Douglas Street; Salt Lake City, Utah; United States
- Coordinates: 40°45′45″N 111°51′17″W
- Area: less than one acre
- Built: 1915
- Architectural style: Prairie School
- Part of: University Neighborhood Historic District (ID95001430)
- NRHP reference No.: 82001751
- Added to NRHP: December 17, 1982

The James G. McAllister House is a historic house in northeastern Salt Lake City, Utah, United States, that is located within the University Neighborhood Historic District, but is individually listed on the National Register of Historic Places (NRHP). In 2026, the house was completely renovated to replace all wiring, plumbing, and to add modern air conditioning and heating. The basement was significantly modified to add windows, lower the basement floor, and to excavate and extend the foundations.

== Description ==
The house was built in 1915 for James G. McAllister, a businessman who later moved to Los Angeles, California and served as a council member. It was listed on the NRHP December 17, 1982.

The house is currently being prepared to lease to University of Utah students for off campus housing.

== See also ==
- National Register of Historic Places listings in Salt Lake City
