= Henry H. Yonkin =

American politician (1850-1941)

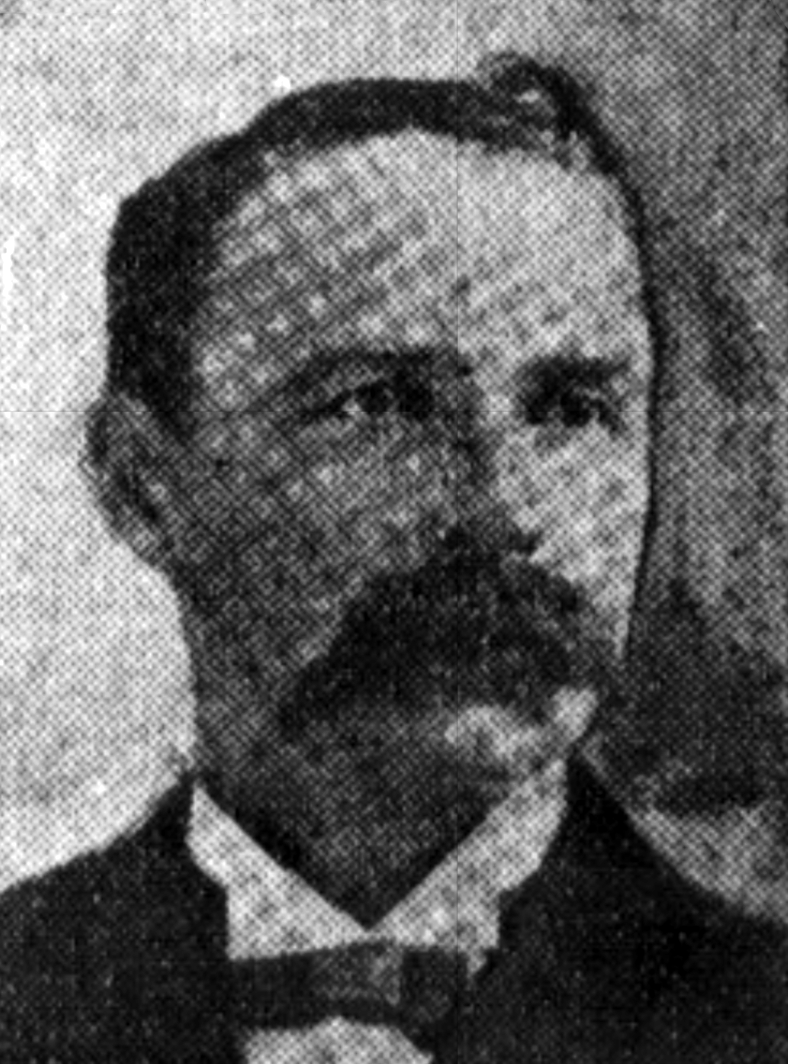
- Yonkin in 1906

Member of the California Senate from the 38th district
- In office January 6, 1919 – January 8, 1923
- Preceded by: John W. Ballard
- Succeeded by: Charles H. V. Lewis

Member of the California State Assembly from the 73rd district
- In office January 8, 1917 – January 6, 1919
- Preceded by: George W. Downing
- Succeeded by: Elmer P. Bromley

Member of the Los Angeles City Council for the 6th ward
- In office December 13, 1906 – December 10, 1909
- Preceded by: Arthur D. Houghton
- Succeeded by: Constituency eliminated

Personal details
- Born: October 11, 1850 Illinois
- Died: February 9, 1941 (aged 90) Los Angeles, California
- Party: Republican
- Spouse: Anna M. Yonkin
- Children: 2

Henry H. Yonkin (October 11, 1850 – February 9, 1941) was a politician who served on the Los Angeles City Council, California State Assembly, and California State Senate.

== Early life and career ==
Yonkin was born in Illinois on October 11, 1850, moving to Los Angeles in 1885 and starting a political career at the age of 35. He served as a deputy sheriff to John C. Cline and was later elected to as a constable for two terms. While serving as a constable, Yonkin was sued for $1,500 for allegedly attaching property from them to help satisfy another party. In July 1903, Yonkin was accused of a felony for prejudice against M. N. Melrose during his trial.

== Political career ==
In 1906, Yonkin was elected to the Los Angeles City Council, succeeding Arthur D. Houghton. Yonkin was elected over Houghton, as many voters viewed Houghton as the "laughing stock of the city." In 1907, recall petitions against Yonkin began circulating. In 1908, the Good Government League launched another recall campaign against Yonkin led by ex-police commissioner Charles Sadler; the initial meeting to decide for the recall had been leaked to the public days prior. Yonkin was briefly considered to be a contender for President of the Los Angeles City Council in 1909. His tenure ended that year after the new City Council system was implemented.

In 1917, Yonkin was elected to the California State Assembly for the 73rd district, beating Socialist George W. Downing and Democrat Harvey B. Dalton in the 1916 election. After serving a term, Yonkin was elected to the California State Assembly for the 38th district beating Independent Charles H. V. Lewis, who would later serve after Yonkin after Yonkin's term.

== Personal life and death ==
Yonkin was married to Anna M. Yonkin; they had two children. On February 9, 1941, Yonkin died at the age of 90 at his home in Historic South Central. Funeral services for Yonkin were held on February 12.
