= Edward E. Moore =

American politician

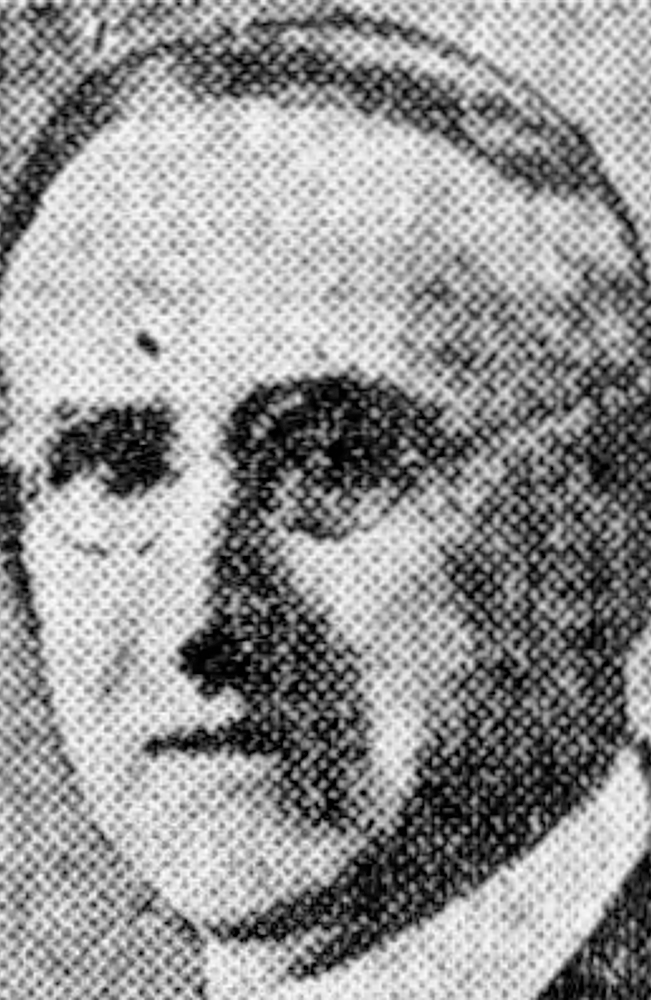
- Moore in 1927

Member of the Los Angeles City Council from the 6th district
- In office July 1, 1925 – June 30, 1927
- Preceded by: District established
- Succeeded by: Lester R. Rice-Wray

Member of the Indiana Senate
- In office 1905–1913

Personal details
- Born: March 12, 1866
- Died: October 23, 1940 (aged 74) Los Angeles, California, US
- Party: Republican

Edward E. Moore (March 12, 1866 – October 23, 1940) was a teacher, newspaper editor and publisher, author and lawyer who served in the Indiana Senate from 1905 to 1913. He was also a Los Angeles City Council member from 1925 to 1927.

== Early life ==
Moore was born March 12, 1866, in Virginia. He attended Valparaiso University and graduated from National Normal University. He attended National University Law School in Washington, D.C., after 1900.

== Career ==
After college Moore spent five years teaching in Ohio. In 1891 he moved to West College Corner in Union County, Indiana. Before entering political life, Moore was a newspaper editor and publisher at the College Corner (OH) Chronicle in 1898 and 1899. He also worked for the Connersville Courier in Fayette County, Indiana.

From 1900 to 1902 he worked as a U.S. Census Bureau clerk in Washington, D.C. Moore was admitted to the bar in 1903. After law school Moore returned to Indiana, where he authored Moore’s Cyclopedia (Connersville, Indiana, 1905), A Century of Indiana (New York, 1910), and other publications. In 1912 he worked as a salesman for a calendar company.

In 1913 Moore moved to Los Angeles, and by 1925 he was referred to as a "successful lawyer, editor and writer."

Moore entered politics in 1898 when he ran for a seat in the Indiana House of Representatives as a Republican, but lost the race. After returning to Indiana from law school in Washington, D.C., Moore was elected to the Indiana Senate in 1905, where he represented Fayette, Henry, and Union Counties for two years. From 1907 to 1913 he continued to serve in the Indiana Senate, this time for Fayette, Hancock, and Rush Counties. Moore was also a member of the Indiana State Educational Commission.

Moore's first bid for public office in Los Angeles, as mayor in 1923, fell short when he came in third with 7,175 votes, against 61,766 for the incumbent George E. Cryer, and Bert L. Farmer with 17,672. In 1925 Moore ran for the open seat in the newly formed Council District 6 and won against C.W. Clegg, 5,237 votes to 4,656. At that time the district encompassed the Hyde Park and Angeles Mesa annexations, Vermont Avenue south to 62nd Street, and a shoestring strip leading to Westchester, Mines Field and the Hyperion sewage screening plant.

He was chairman of the council's public utilities committee and in 1925 voted in favor of establishing a unified rail station near the Plaza, where it now stands. Moore was also instrumental in persuading the Los Angeles Railway Company to abandon its right-of-way on Santa Barbara Avenue between Figueroa Street and Third Avenue so the tracks could be lowered to street level and the entire roadway resurfaced.

In 1927 Lester R. Rice-Wray defeated Moore's reelection bid. Later that year Moore helped form an organization known as Metropolitan Southwest to make an "advertising campaign" for a 100-square-mile (260 km^{2}) area including Palos Verdes Estates, Culver City, Hawthorne, Torrance, El Segundo, Redondo Beach, Hermosa Beach, Manhattan Beach and parts of Los Angeles. That same year he served on the board of directors of an organization formed to recall Mayor Cryer. In 1932 Moore ran unsuccessfully for the 15th Congressional District seat.

== Personal life ==
He married Retta Harold in 1896; his second wife was named Rosalind. Moore was the father of two children.

He was a member of several clubs, including the Knights of Pythias, the Improved Order of Red Men, Odd Fellows, and the Indiana Editorial Association. Moore died on October 23, 1940, at the California Hospital in Los Angeles. He was buried in the Inglewood Park Cemetery.

Preceded by District established	Los Angeles City Council; 6th District; 1925–1927	Succeeded by Lester R. Rice-Wray
