= Bert L. Farmer =

American politician (1875-1939)

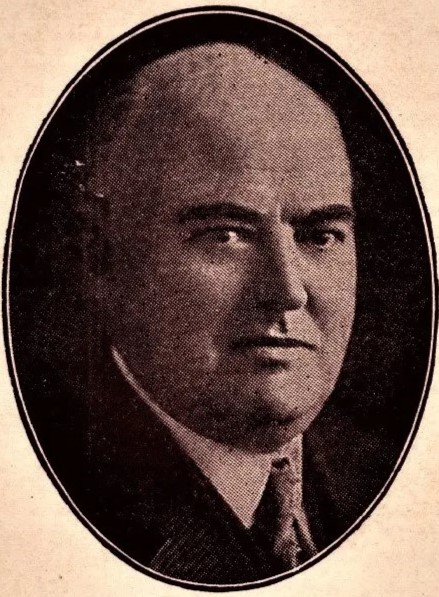
- Farmer in 1923

Member of the California State Assembly from the 71st district
- In office January 8, 1917 – January 6, 1919
- Preceded by: Lewis A. Spengler
- Succeeded by: Henry E. Carter

Member of the Los Angeles City Council for the at-large district
- In office July 1, 1917 – July 5, 1921

President of the Los Angeles City Council
- In office January 3, 1918 – July 7, 1919
- Preceded by: James Simpson Conwell
- Succeeded by: Boyle Workman

Personal details
- Born: February 27, 1875 Arroyo Grande, California, US
- Died: May 31, 1939 (aged 64) Los Angeles, California, US
- Party: Republican
- Spouse: Maude Farmer
- Children: 2

Robert "Bert" L. Farmer (February 27, 1875 – May 31, 1939) was an American politician who served in the California State Assembly and in the Los Angeles City Council. He unsuccessfully challenged George E. Cryer in the 1923 Los Angeles mayoral election.

== Early life and career ==
Farmer was born on February 27, 1875. He and his family, resided in both San Luis Obispo County and Merced County before he moved to Los Angeles in 1893, where he became an insurance adjuster. In 1903, Farmer was chosen by the Board of Education to become the census marshal. In 1906, he became a city purchasing agent before becoming a deputy city clerk, city schools census marshal, and later the regional supervisor for the 1910 United States census.

== Political career ==
On November 7, 1916 California State Assembly election, Farmer won the seat for the 71st district over Socialist Party incumbent Lewis A. Spengler, Progressive candidate John H. Martin, and Prohibition candidate James Gillespie. On July 1, 1917, while still serving as an Assemblyman, Farmer won a seat on the Los Angeles City Council.

On January 3, 1918, Farmer was elected by the Council to become the President of the Los Angeles City Council, succeeding James Simpson Conwell. During his one-year tenure, he presided over the renaming of Central Park to Pershing Square, helped with city celebrations for Eddie Rickenbacker, and cooperated with Mayor Frederic T. Woodman to "suppress[...] sedition in Los Angeles."

In 1920, he was a candidate for Los Angeles County Supervisor for the 4th district, but lost the election. In the 1923 Los Angeles mayoral election, he unsuccessfully challenged incumbent George E. Cryer for the office of Mayor, to which he advocated for a new city charter. In May 1933, he was a candidate for the 73rd State Assembly district, but lost to Howard W. Davis.

== Personal life and death ==
Farmer was married to Maude Farmer, and the two of them had two children, Ada Carroll and Dorothy Reamer. He became ill during the last three years of his life, dying at his home in Pico Union on May 31, 1939. His funeral was held on June 2, 1939.
