= James Potter Davenport =

American politician

James Potter Davenport (1841–1905) was a Los Angeles, California, City Council member who was the first official in the United States to be removed from office in a recall election.

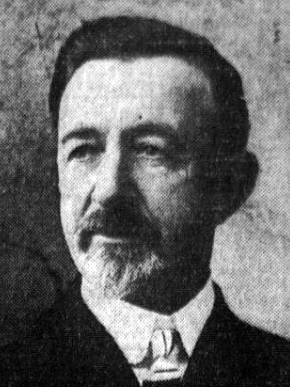
Davenport

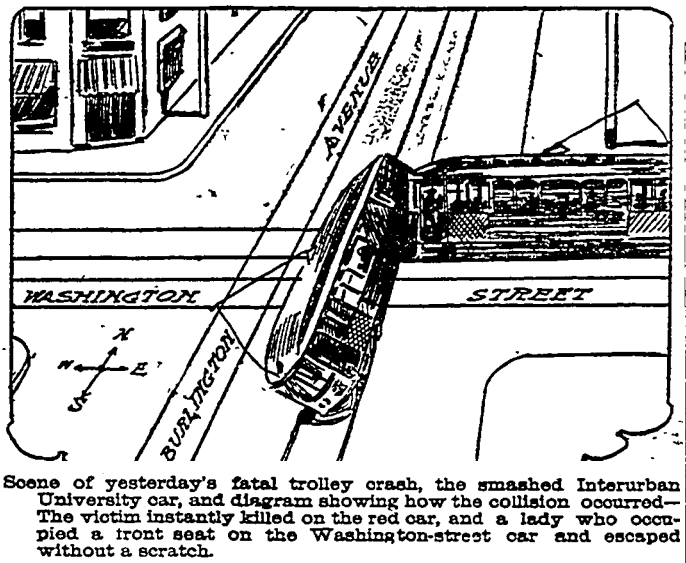
(Los Angeles Times)

He was born in western Virginia in 1841. He served in the U.S. Navy during the Civil War, first on the Mississippi River and then on the Pacific Coast, where he was mustered out at war's end. He settled in Nevada City, California, and married, then he moved with his family to San Francisco and was a salesman with Sherwood & Sherwood. About 1892, he relocated to Los Angeles.

Davenport was elected in 1902 as a Republican in the Sixth Ward of the Los Angeles City Council but was recalled the next year in the first such election in the nation. He had voted in favor of a city printing contract awarded to the Los Angeles Times even though the Times' bid was $10,000 higher than its nearest competitor. The recall petition also accused him of "aiding and abetting in the erection of a large and offensive slaughter-house." In the election, Davenport was beaten by Arthur D. Houghton. The recall was later ruled invalid by the State Supreme Court because of fictitious or unwarranted names on the petition, with Davenport entitled to four months' back pay.

Later, he worked on behalf of the Los Angeles Humane Society and in the year of his death was "laboring earnestly to prevent the sale of tobacco to minors. . . . His efforts were aimed directly at dealers who conduct small stands in the vicinity of schools." He was married and had three daughters, Mrs. R.M. Watson, Mrs. G.M. Crowe and Ethel Davenport.

Davenport died on December 1, 1905, when a streetcar on which he was riding was struck by another one at the intersection of Washington Street and Burlington Avenue in today's Pico-Union neighborhood and overturned, crushing him and injuring 20 others.
