= Arthur D. Houghton =

American politician and botanist (1870–1938)

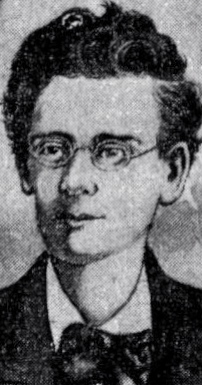
- Houghton in 1904

Member of the Los Angeles City Council
- In office 1904–1906
- Preceded by: James Potter Davenport
- Succeeded by: Henry H. Yonkin

Personal details
- Born: June 6, 1870 London, England, U.K.
- Died: January 23, 1938 (aged 67) Los Angeles, California, U.S.
- Party: Democrat; Republican (from 1914)
- Spouse: Florence Gildersleeve (after 1913)
- Education: Oxford University; Royal Military School of Engineers

Arthur Duvernoix Houghton (June 8, 1870 – January 23, 1938) was an English-born American medical doctor, a botanist specializing in cacti, a member of the Los Angeles, California, City Council from 1904 to 1906 and one of the founders of the American Legion. In his early years he was a showman who presented performances in hypnotism and conducted seances.

== Personal ==
Houghton was born in London, England, on June 8, 1871, and was educated at Oxford University and the Royal Military School of Engineers. He served in the British Army. Houghton had a medical degree and a doctorate of philosophy. He lived in Chicago, Illinois, where he was secretary of the South Side Business Men's League, and he was said to be in Los Angeles in November 1894, when he conducted seances in that city. He moved to Los Angeles around 1902. He was married to Florence Gildersleeve of Chicago in June 1913.

Houghton played the role of Doctor Caius, a French physician, in a benefit Los Angeles performance of William Shakespeare's The Merry Wives of Windsor in April 1904. He was said to be of slight build and to have "auburn" or "pink topped" hair.

Houghton suffered a heart attack on November 29, 1933, as he was waiting to testify as an expert witness in a lawsuit.

He died on January 23, 1938, after being stricken on the train as he was returning to California from a trip to New York with others in a successful bid to have the 1938 American Legion convention held in Los Angeles. He was survived by his widow; their home was at 14714 Chatsworth Drive, San Fernando. His body lay in state in the rotunda of the Los Angeles City Hall, guarded by a phalanx of American Legionnaires; services were held at St. Paul's Episcopal Cathedral and private cremation followed.

== Botany ==
Houghton was a noted botanist. He was author of The Cactus Book, published in 1931 by the Macmillan Company He was said to have discovered a "purple orange" in 1911, and he "boasted he was one of the few persons who could grow orchids in an open flower bed." He developed a succulent called "Houghton's Hybrid", Kalanchoe ×houghtoni (Kalanchoe delagoensis × daigremontiana). Kalanchoe ×houghtoni 'Pink Butterflies' has pink plantlets on its phylloclades.

In Los Angeles, his collection was a notable one, valued at $20,000 in 1906, with specimens of 800 varieties from "inaccessible deserts", from "Argentina, Patagonia, Mexico and other places. . . . German and Italian botanists have sent him specimens of the rarest kinds." He offered to donate it to the city for a park in Boyle Heights, but the offer was refused by the parks commission because the property offered by J. Harvey McCarthy on Stephenson Avenue between Pioneer Drive and Fresno Street already had a wooded ravine with an assortment of "magnificent trees".

By 1928, Houghton had moved to San Fernando, California, at 11224 Chatsworth Road, and he was specializing in development of the Watsonia. "This is the finest crop I have had in twenty years," Houghton told a reporter. In 1929 Houghton was president of the Cactus Society of America

== Municipal service ==
=== 1904–1906 term ===
Ciry Councilman James P. Davenport, a Republican, was recalled by the voters on September 16, 1904, because he had voted in favor of a city printing contract awarded to the Los Angeles Times even though the Times' bid was $10,000 higher than its nearest competitor. The recall petition also accused him of "aiding and abetting in the erection of a large and offensive slaughter-house."

Houghton, a nonpartisan, was elected on the same ballot to fill the balance of Potter's term. Houghton thus became the first person in the United States to succeed an ousted public official after a recall. He was seated in the council on September 20, 1904.

Houghton was elected to serve only until the end of Davenport's term, on December 8, 1904, so he faced another election on December 5, which he won in a plurality vote over Scholl, a Republican, and Weber, a Democrat.

Shortly after he was elected, Houghton told a reporter he supported the ideas of Herbert Spencer, the prominent classical liberal political theorist of the Victorian era, and he said that he was "in favor of less grade crossings and more statues."

==== Newspaper endorsements ====
Davenport was supported by the Los Angeles Times and the Los Angeles Herald. Houghton had the backing of the Los Angeles Examiner, the Los Angeles Express and the Los Angeles Record.

===== Los Angeles Times =====
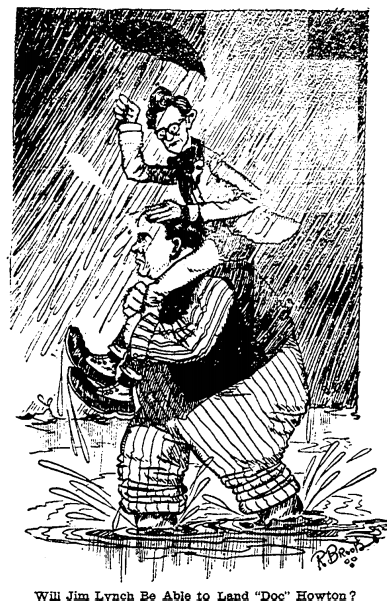
Times cartoon of Houghton (with umbrella), December 3, 1904

The Times questioned whether Houghton had ever become a U.S. citizen, and after the September election it hired a Chicago firm to check the records in that city. When none were found, the Times stated that "He has not shown that he is an American citizen." The Examiner, however, was able to produce a telegram from Chicago verifying that Arthur Howton, as the name was spelled, "took out his naturalization papers on March 31, 1892." The telegram was presented to the City Council by an Examiner reporter, and the council on September 20 thereupon seated Houghton by a unanimous vote.

The Times, at that time edited by the publisher, Harrison Gray Otis, generally spelled Houghton's name as "Howton". and called him a "seancer" and a "spook" or a "spook doctor".

In a front-page article published on September 21, 1904, the Los Angeles Examiner, owned by William Randolph Hearst, claimed that reporter Fred Hopewell of the Times had stated in front of witnesses that:

General Otis says that he will drive you and your woman out of Los Angeles penniless. . . . we are to make a personal canvass among your friends and patients to prevent you from getting a practice. Before you go into the council we will make you sweat blood. We will make you cringe and go upon your knees and sue us for peace.

Hopewell denied the accusation in a signed statement in the Times the next day.

On September 22, 1904, the Times published a story alleging that "Arthur Howton" had moved from Chicago to San Francisco during the California Midwinter International Exposition of 1894 and took work as an electrical wireman. "He soon announced that this work was too strenuous and soon blossomed forth as a professor of hypnotism." The Times quoted articles from the San Francisco Examiner and the San Francisco Call, published on February 28, 1894, stating that Howton had attempted suicide by swallowing morphine and that authorities had discovered a note he had written expressing anguish over his unreturned love for a woman, The Times said Howton had then come to Los Angeles where he was "ordained a minister in the Spiritualist church and in little more than a week . . . he was exposed as a fake medium." The newspaper then said that "Prof. Arthur" subsequently made appearances in Denver, Colorado, and in Kenwood Hall, Chicago.

The Times continued:

In 1902 he came to Los Angeles and commenced to practice medicine without the formality of taking out a physician's certificate. This was objected to by the health officers and he later secured a certificate which passed the muster of the Health Office.

===== Los Angeles Express and Los Angeles Tribune =====
Houghton received financial support from Edwin T. Earl, publisher of the evening Express and the morning Tribune, according to Houghton's testimony when he was a witness in a $150,000 libel action that Earl unsuccessfully brought in 1917 against the Los Angeles Record. Houghton said he had had two conferences with Earl during the 1904 councilmanic campaign, the second including a question from Earl asking "Why didn't you tell me that you had a past?" "He was very angry that I didn't go into my past, from the cradle up," Houghton testified, adding that the publisher said he had assigned a detective to follow Houghton for six weeks "and that he had the goods on me."

==== 'Resignation' ====
In a council session on June 9, 1905, Houghton submitted his resignation and left the council chamber after the council refused to bar Attorney C.C. Wright from speaking. He was insulted, Houghton said, because Wright had referred to him as Mister, rather than Doctor. Houghton returned in person on June 19 and, saying that his previous action had been "temporary", requested his seat be returned to him. After some public discussion and a closed meeting, the council allowed him to retain his position.

=== 1917 and 1919 elections ===
By 1917, Los Angeles had adopted a new city charter, by which all City Council members ran on an at-large basis, with the top eighteen who survived the primary facing a runoff and the top nine of those being chosen at the second election. Houghton put his name in nomination, with one of his election planks being the construction of a new city jail with a modern receiving hospital. He survived the primary but in the final balloting in June 1917 he placed twelfth and so was not chosen.

Two days after the election, Houghton was walking near the City Hall with one of the victors, John R. Reeves, when Reeves was stricken by a heart attack but was revived when Houghton administered an injection of strychnine.

In 1919, Houghton ran again, but this time he came in 19th in the primary and so was defeated there.

=== Hospital ===
In September 1917, Houghton was appointed by Receiving Hospital Director John B. Gilmer to oversee the medical facilities at the city jail.

== Arrest ==
No longer a City Council member, Houghton was arrested along with Sherman L. Dodge, a house painter, at Seventh Street and Grand Avenue on July 11, 1908, for speaking on the street without permission of the Police Commission. The arrest before a crowd of about 2,000 was "dramatic in the extreme", the Herald reported. "The crowd was largely composed of persons who had followed the Socialist speakers from Seventh and Main strets [sic] when it was found that speaking at that point would seriously interfere with the movement of street car traffic."

Houghton said:

I was a member of the council when this unfair and unAmerican ordinance went through. I voted against it because I believed it to be not only unconstitutional but [also] iniquitous. . . . I believe the safety of the republic and the welfare of the nation demands that the principal of freedom of speech and of the press be held sacred.

After "a vigorous street speaking campaign . . . waged by Socialists, of whom more than a score were arrested," the ordinance was repealed and all those taken into custody were freed without trial.

== World War I and American Legion ==
In April 1917 Houghton helped organize a medical reserves unit of the Home Guard, in which he had the rank of lieutenant-colonel. In June 1918 he helped begin a move to compel all British subjects between the ages of 18 and 50 "to enlist for service abroad," except for those "supporting dependents." He said aid in the campaign would come from the American Protective League.

Houghton resigned from city service in June 1918 to accept a commission in the Army Medical Corps. He left for his assignment in San Francisco, accompanied by his wife. At his death he was reported to have served in the 60th Coast Artillery.

After the war, Houghton was one of the 11 men who formed the American Legion veterans organization.

== Syndicalism trial ==
Houghton was "the star witness" in the 1920 trial of Sydney R. Flowers, who was charged in a Los Angeles court with criminal syndicalism. Houghton told of his conversation with Flowers at the Soldiers' and Sailors' War Replacement Bureau, in which Flowers made a "general tirade against government" and "lauded the I.W.W. in Seattle." Defense attorney John Beardsley subjected Houghton to a "rigid cross-examination" in an effort to show that Houghton had been opposed by Flowers "in one of his ambitions and for that reason felt hostile toward him."

The defense called three witnesses to testify that Houghton's reputation for "truth, honesty and integrity" was "bad." Houghton, however, was vouched for by eleven witnesses, including Buron Fitts of the American Legion. Flowers eventually fled to Canada.

== Honors ==
Houghton had fellowships in the Royal Horticultural Society of England, the British Association for the Advancement of Science and the American Association for the Advancement of Science. In 1939 a tree was planted in his honor in an observance by more than a hundred military veterans at the Veterans Administration facility in today's North Hills, Los Angeles.

Preceded by James Potter Davenport	Los Angeles City Council, 1889–1909; 6th Ward; 1904–06	Succeeded by Henry H. Yonkin
