= Edwin T. Earl =

American journalist

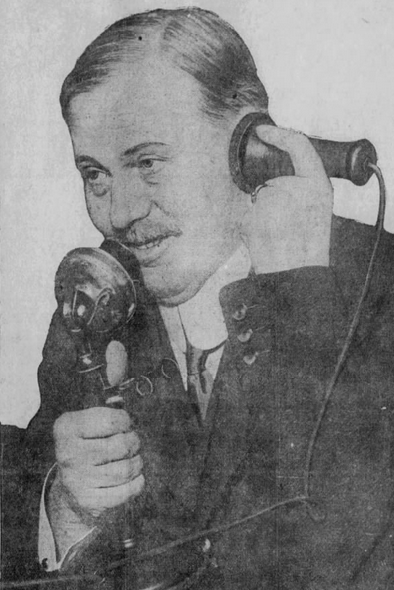
- Born: Edwin Tobias Earl; May 30, 1858; Tehama County, California
- Died: January 2, 1919 (aged 60); Los Angeles, California
- Resting place: Hollywood Forever Cemetery, Hollywood, California
- Occupation: Publisher
- Political party: Republican
- Spouse: Emily Jarvis Earl (m. 1902)
- Children: 4

Edwin Tobias Earl (May 30, 1858 – January 2, 1919) was an American businessman, newspaper publisher and philanthropist.

== Biography ==
=== Early life ===
Edwin T. Earl was born on a fruit ranch near Red Bluff, California on May 30, 1858. His father was Joseph Earl and his mother, Adelia Chaffee. His brother was Guy Chaffee Earl.

=== Career ===
He started his career in the shipping of fruits. By 1886, he was President of the Earl Fruit Company. In 1890, he invented the refrigerator car to transport fruits to the East Coast of the United States. He established the Continental Fruit Express and invested US$2,000,000 in refrigerator cars. In 1901, he sold his refrigerator cars to Armour and Company of Chicago and became a millionaire.

In 1901, he purchased the Los Angeles Express and became its editor. Ten years later, in 1911, he also purchased the Los Angeles Tribune.

He also invested in real estate in Los Angeles.

He was a Freemason, a member of the California Club and the Jonathan Club, two private member's clubs in Los Angeles, and the Bolsa Chica Gun Club. He was a member of the California Republican Party.

=== Philanthropy ===
In 1901, he made a donation to the Pacific School of Religion in Berkeley, California to start the Earl Lectures. For more than a hundred years, it has featured distinguished guest speakers like Theodore Roosevelt, Maya Angelou, Harry Emerson Fosdick and Cecil Williams.

=== Personal life ===
He married Emily Jarvis Earl of Louisville, Kentucky on April 30, 1902. They had three sons, Jarvis, Edwin (1905–1981) and Chaffee, and one daughter, Emily. They resided in Los Angeles, California. He died on January 2, 1919, in Los Angeles.
