= Los Angeles Tribune (1911–1918) =

Newspaper published from 1911 to 1918 by Edwin T. Earl

The Los Angeles Tribune was a newspaper published by Edwin T. Earl (1858–1919) after he had made a fortune through his invention of the refrigerated boxcar used to ship oranges from Southern California to markets in the Eastern United States. Its first issue was on July 4, 1911, and its last was on July 5, 1918. John B. Elliott served as the paper's managing editor. The newspaper was associated with the Progressive Party.
