= James Simpson Conwell =

American businessman and inventor

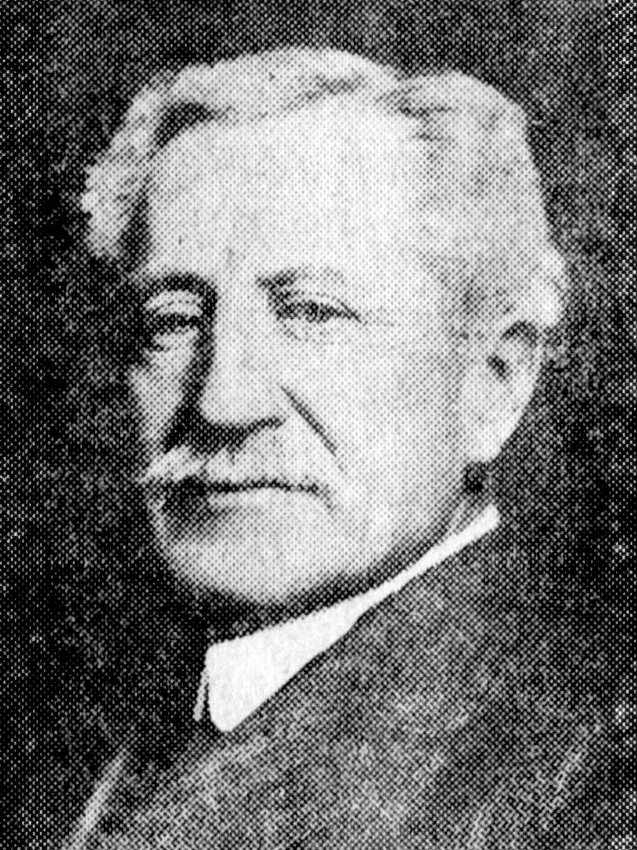
- Conwell in 1915

Member of the Los Angeles City Council for the at-large district
- In office July 1, 1913 – December 15, 1917
- Preceded by: Josias J. Andrews
- Succeeded by: Frank Harwood True

Personal details
- Born: July 4, 1859; Winona, Minnesota
- Died: December 5, 1917 (aged 58)

James Simpson Conwell (July 4, 1859 – December 15, 1917) was a businessman, inventor and local politician in Illinois and California.

== Personal and business life ==
Conwell was born on July 4, 1859, in Winona, Minnesota, the son of the Rev. F.A. Conwell and wife. He was educated in Evanston, Illinois, and Lake View, Illinois, then earned a Bachelor of Science degree at Northwestern University, Evanston, in 1882.

He moved to Los Angeles after graduation and in 1885 became a partner in the men's furnishing business of Evans & Conwell. From 1889 to 1894, he was associated with Folmer, Clogg & Co. in San Francisco, and the following three years he was engaged in the bicycle industry. From 1897 to 1900 Conwell was the Indianapolis, Indiana, manager of the Indiana Bicycle Company, then in 1900 became president of the Wilke Manufacturing Company in Anderson, Indiana. Moving to Los Angeles, he was secretary of the United Motors Company from 1907 to 1913.

In 1899, he built the first Waverly electric pleasure car. He was also the inventor of a gasifier to permit the use of distillate in motor engines.

Conwell and Mae Hopkinson were married in 1891. They had two daughters, Larooka and Delsey. In 1909 they lived at 347 Mount Washington Drive, Mount Washington, Los Angeles, and in the 1910s at 871 Gramercy Drive or Place in today's Koreatown.

Conwell died in Blythe, California, while on a motor trip and vacation. His body lay in state in the Los Angeles City Hall, and then a funeral service was held at St. John's Episcopal Church, Los Angeles, with city and county officials in attendance. Cremation followed. "Never before at the funeral of a city official was there such a profusion of floral offerings and tribute," said the Los Angeles Times. "The Council chamber was a mass of flowers, and so was the church."

== Public life ==
Conwell was a town clerk in Evanston in 1881 and 1882 and was a member of the United States Life Saving Crew. In San Francisco, he was a member of the Charter Committee of One Hundred in that city and president of the Motor Dealers Association there in 1911 and 1912. He served a term as president of the city's Cycle Board of Trade.

He was elected to the Los Angeles City Council in 1913 and reelected in 1915 and 1917, leading a fight for a city ordinance that would exclude billboards from residential areas. He was president of the council.

Conwell was a member of the University Clubs of Los Angeles and San Francisco, the Society of Automobile Engineers, Phi Kappa Sigma, the Los Angeles Athletic Club, the Automobile Club of Southern California, Gamut Club, Annandale Country Club and the Methodist Episcopal Church.
