= Chávez Ravine (disambiguation) =

Chavez Ravine is an area in Los Angeles, California, where Dodger Stadium is located.

Chávez Ravine may also refer to:

- Chávez Ravine Stadium, a nickname for Dodger Stadium itself
- The Battle of Chavez Ravine, controversy surrounding the 1951–1961 government acquisition of land in Chavez Ravine largely owned by Mexican Americans

== Other uses ==
- Chavez Ravine, a 1992 film by Norberto Barba
- Chávez Ravine: A Los Angeles Story:, a 2003 documentary by Jordan Mechner
- Chávez Ravine (album), a 2005 concept album by musician Ry Cooder
