= First Jewish site in Los Angeles =

California Historic Landmark

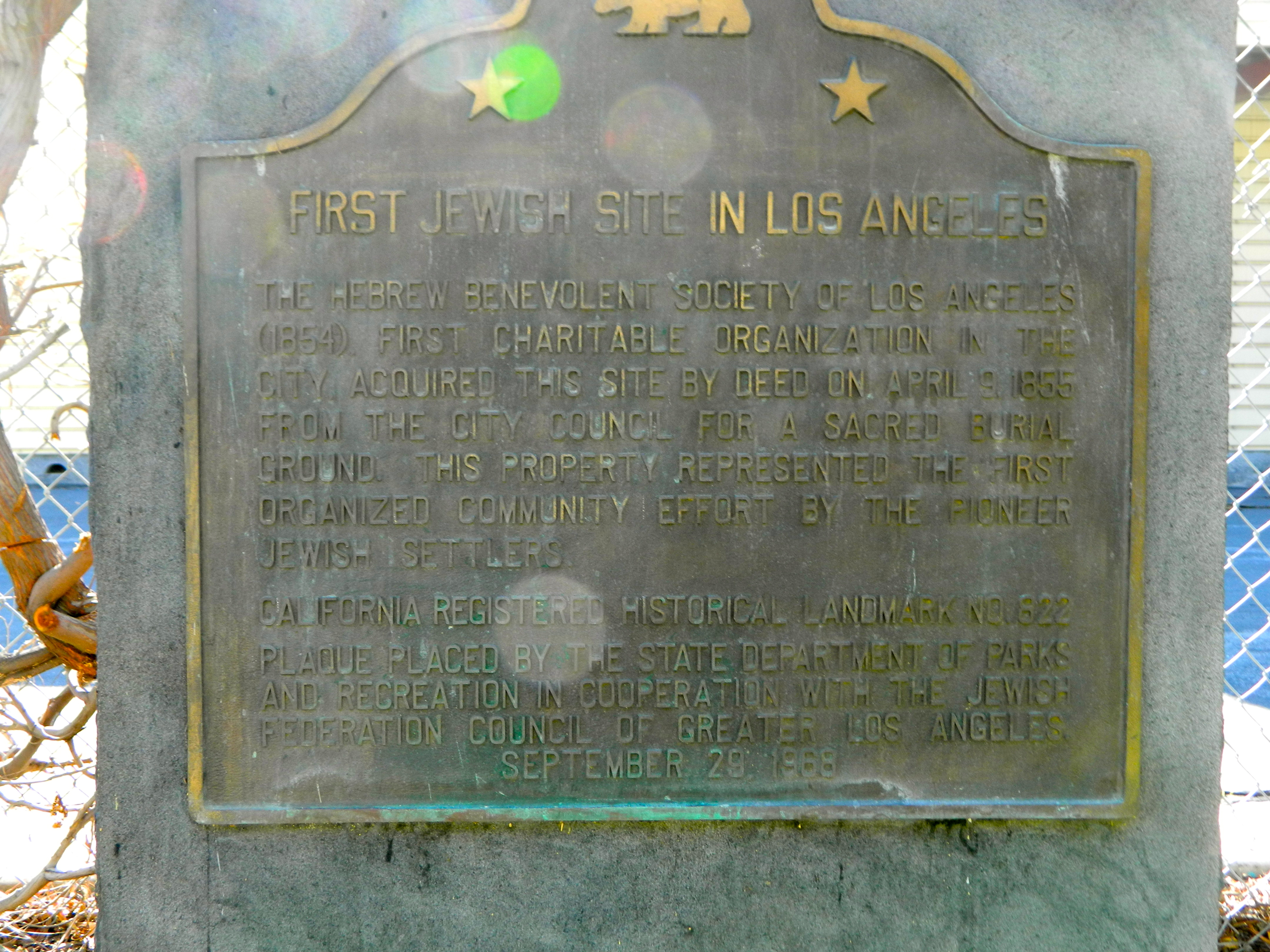
- Marker for the First Jewish Site in Los Angeles County

- Location within the Los Angeles metropolitan area
- 34°04′10″N 118°14′28″W
- Location: Chavez Ravine in Los Angeles

History
- Built: 1855

California Historical Landmark
- Designated: Jan. 26, 1968
- Reference no.: 822

The First Jewish site in Los Angeles is the first Jewish cemetery in the City of Los Angeles, opened in 1855 by Hebrew Benevolent Society of Los Angeles, the first charitable organization in Los Angeles. The First Jewish site in Los Angeles was designated a California Historic Landmark (No. 822) on January 26, 1968.

== History ==
The First Jewish site in Los Angeles is located at Chavez Ravine in Los Angeles in Los Angeles County. In 1902, the cemetery was moved, a California Historic Landmark is at the place of the original cemetery. The Hebrew Benevolent Society of Los Angeles was founded in 1854 for the purpose of "procuring a piece of ground suitable for the purpose of a burying ground for the deceased of their own faith, and also to appropriate a portion of their time and means to the holy cause of benevolence". The Hebrew Benevolent Society of Los Angeles received the deed to land from the Los Angeles City Council on April 9, 1855. With this land they established the first Jewish cemetery in Los Angeles at Lilac Terrace and Lookout Drive in Chavez Ravine. The site is now the current site of Dodger Stadium and the Los Angeles Fire Department's Frank Hotchkin Memorial Training Center.

In 1902, because of poor environmental conditions due to the unchecked expansion of the oil industry in the area, it was proposed by Congregation B'nai B'rith to secure a new plot of land in what is now East Los Angeles, and to move the buried remains to the new site, with a continued provision for burial of indigent people. This site, the Home of Peace Cemetery in East Los Angeles, remains operational and is the oldest Jewish cemetery in Los Angeles. The original society is now known as the "Jewish Family Service of Los Angeles". Solomon Lazard, a Los Angeles merchant, served on the Los Angeles City Council in 1853, and also headed the first Los Angeles Chamber of Commerce.

== Marker ==
Marker on the site reads:

- NO. 822 FIRST JEWISH SITE IN LOS ANGELES - The Hebrew Benevolent Society of Los Angeles (1854), first charitable organization in the city, acquired this site from the city council by deed of April 9, 1855. This purchase of a sacred burial ground represented the first organized community effort by the pioneer Jewish settlers.'

== See also ==
- California Historical Landmarks in Los Angeles County
- Chevra Kaddisha Cemetery, Sacramento, first Jewish cemetery in the state
