= Adam Kokesh =

American political activist (born 1982)

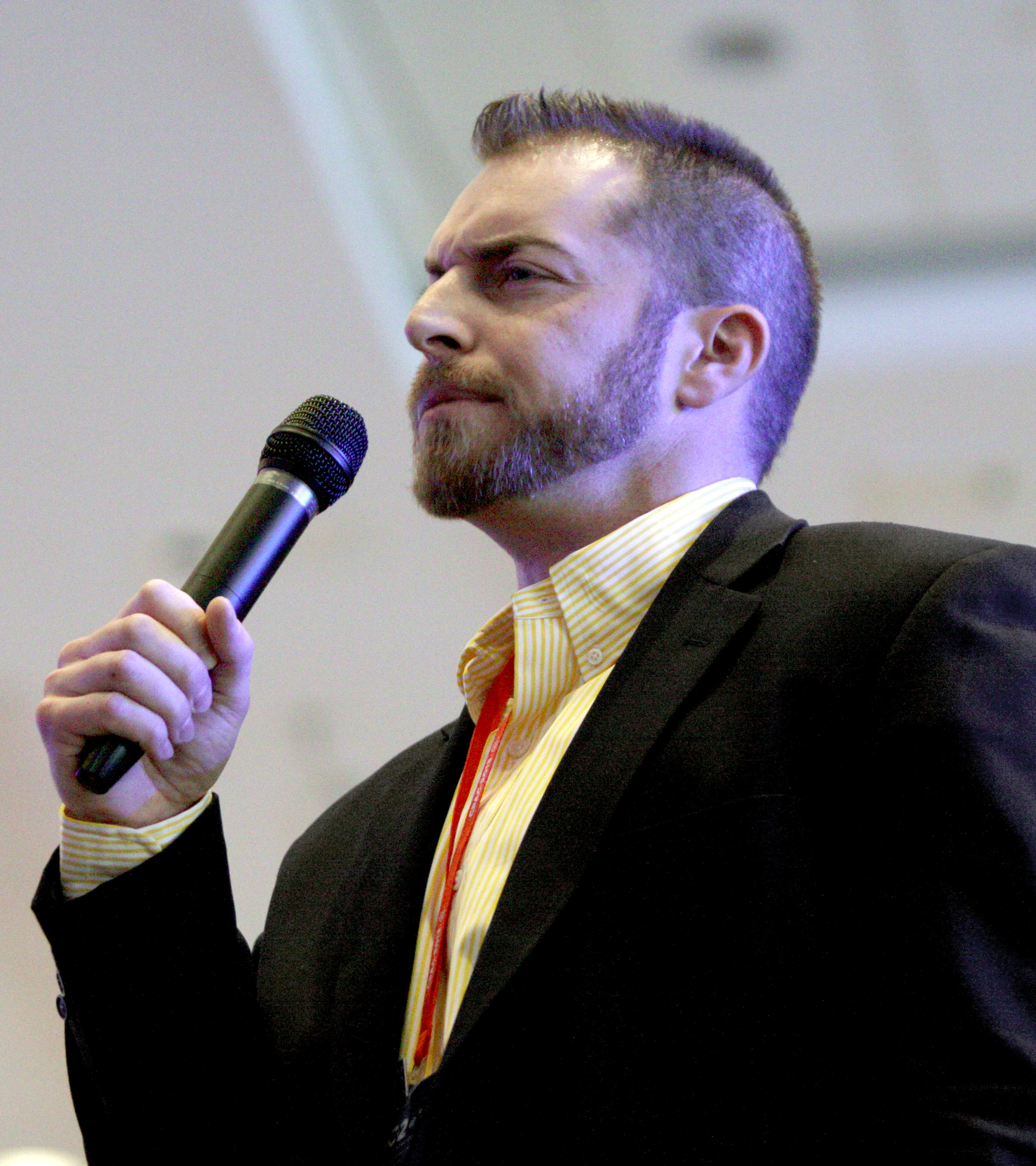
- Kokesh in 2013

Personal details
- Born: Adam Charles Kokesh; February 1, 1982 (age 44) San Francisco, California, U.S.
- Party: Libertarian (2013–present)
- Other political affiliations: Republican (before 2013)
- Education: Claremont McKenna College, George Washington University
- Occupation: Activist, author, independent journalist

Military service
- Allegiance: United States
- Branch/service: United States Marine Corps
- Years of service: 1999–2007
- Rank: Corporal
- Unit: 3rd Civil Affairs Group
- Battles/wars: Iraq War

Adam Charles Kokesh (/ˈkoʊkɛʃ/; born February 1, 1982) is an American political activist, radio host, and author. He was a candidate in the U.S. 2020 Libertarian Party presidential primaries, running on the single-issue platform of an "orderly dissolution of the federal government."

Kokesh is a former U.S. Marine Corps corporal, serving in the Iraq War in 2004. Upon his return from Iraq, he became an anti-war activist and an advocate for Iraq Veterans Against the War. He emerged as a radio talk show host in 2011 when his TV, radio, and web access show Adam vs. The Man was licensed by RT America; this show was cancelled months later due to an FEC complaint.

== Early life ==
Adam Kokesh was born on February 1, 1982, in San Francisco, California, and is of German and Jewish heritage. He was raised in a middle-class family, and is the oldest of five siblings. His parents divorced when he was 10, after which Kokesh says he took refuge in punk rock.

His father, Charles Kokesh, is a businessman, trophy hunter, and at one time the owner of Santa Fe Horse Park.

As an adolescent, Kokesh had an interest in sports, science and technology, and was encouraged by his parents to read numerous books. When Kokesh was fourteen, he attended Devil Pups junior base camp at Camp Pendleton in San Diego County, California.

He attended Stevenson School, a boarding school in Pebble Beach, for his first year of high school, until he was kicked out for possession of alcohol.

He later attended the Native American Preparatory School in San Miguel County, New Mexico. During high school, Kokesh founded the campus radio station.

Kokesh received a bachelor's degree in psychology from Claremont McKenna College. He was the president of the Libertarian Club in college. He later enrolled in graduate studies in political management at George Washington University.

=== Military service ===
Kokesh says he was inspired by his grandfather to enlist in the United States Marine Corps reserves at the age of seventeen, while still attending high school.

Following graduation from high school, Kokesh volunteered to go to Fallujah, Iraq, with the 3rd Civil Affairs Group. For his tour in Iraq from February to September 2004, he received a Navy Commendation Medal, Combat Action Ribbon, and was promoted to the rank of a sergeant. He worked in schools and mosques, observed house raids, and says he was in a couple of convoys hit by IEDs.

After completing his first tour, he became disillusioned with the war. Kokesh learned Arabic during his tenure in Iraq.

After Kokesh was honorably discharged in September, he remained a member of the Individual Ready Reserve. He was scheduled to return to Iraq for a second tour, however Kokesh was demoted to a corporal and discharged from the Marine Corps after he wore his Marine uniform during an anti-war demonstration.

== Activism ==
=== Iraq Veterans Against The War ===
In February 2007, he became an active participant in the Iraq Veterans Against the War (IVAW) campaign. On March 19, to mark the 4th anniversary of the 2003 U.S. invasion of Iraq, Kokesh and twelve other IVAW members participated in an occupation-like mock patrol of Washington, D.C.

Kokesh first came to national attention after he was interviewed on CNN and ABC, and his photograph appeared in various newspapers, including the front page of the Los Angeles Times at a protest during Alberto Gonzales's testimony to Congress regarding the dismissal of U.S. attorneys. Kokesh, wearing his Marine Corps Boonie hat, held up a sign counting the number of times Gonzalez said "I don't remember" or "I don't recall" (Kokesh claimed Gonzalez used such phrases 74 times).

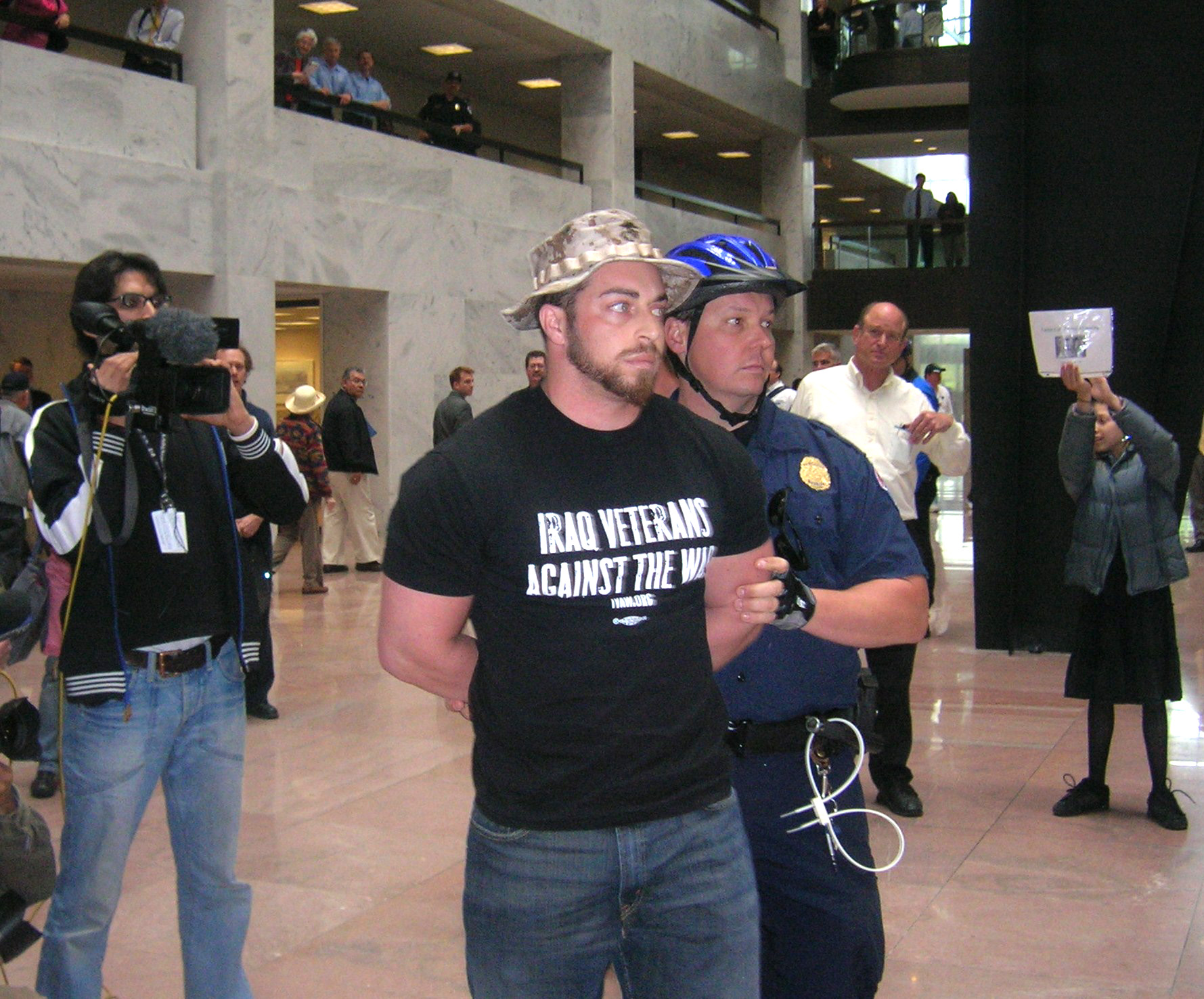
Kokesh being arrested at Senate Hart office building on April 26, 2007.

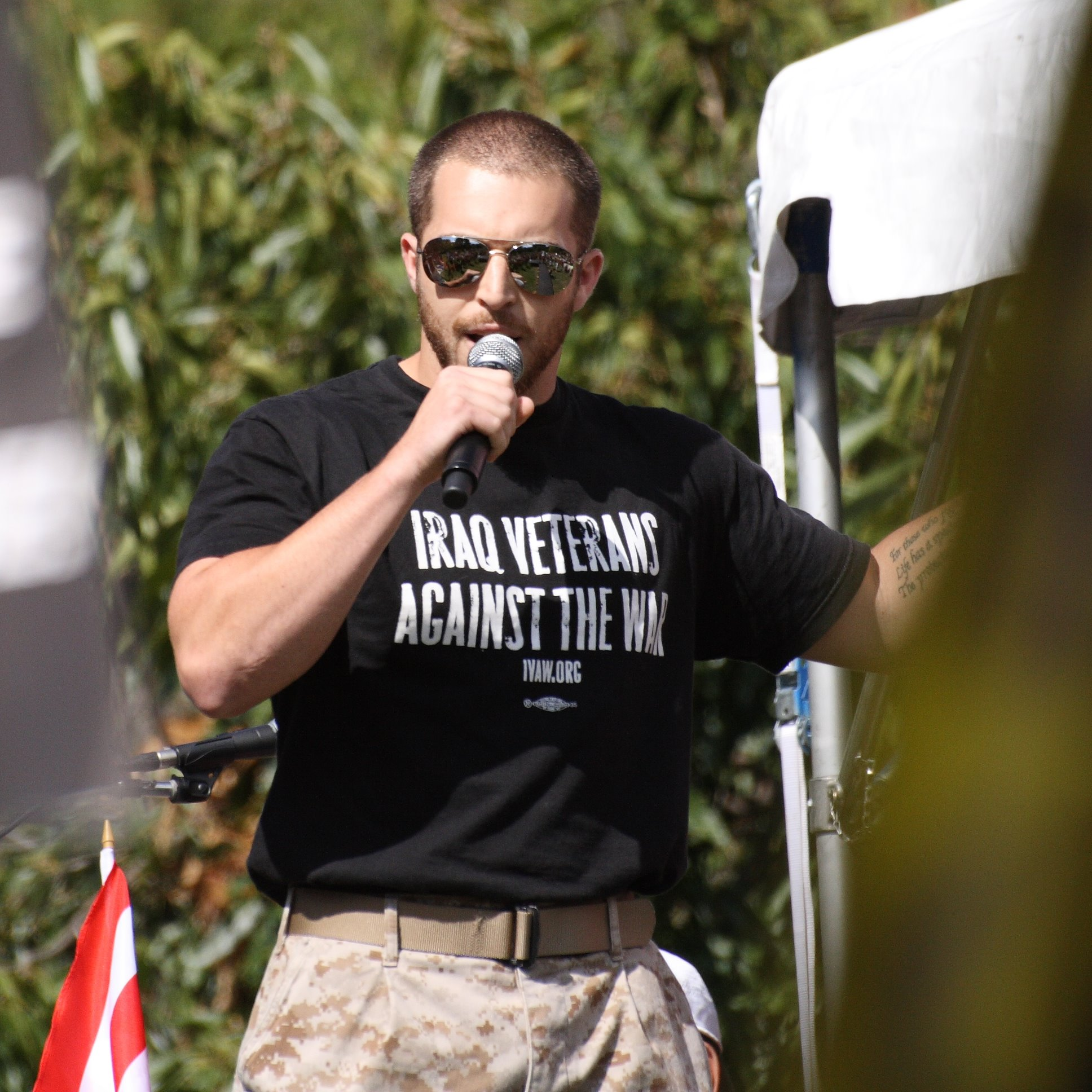
Kokesh speaking at an anti-war protest in September 2007 wearing combat uniform.

In April 2007, Kokesh and a number of other activists were arrested after protesting the Iraq war in the Senate Hart Office Building. Kokesh had performed a ceremony for lost service members using an American flag.

During the Senate Hart Office Building demonstration, Kokesh was wearing combat fatigue pants (with name tags and emblems removed), which the Marine Corps prohibits reserve troops from wearing during anti-war demonstrations. After Kokesh was contacted via e-mail with a warning for violating uniform regulations, he responded with a refusal to comply and used an expletive in his reply. He contends that the warning was an attempt to silence and punish members of the military for exercising their constitutional rights; while the Marine Corps said it was a matter of ordinary discipline and Kokesh was not singled out. In June, a panel of officers stripped Kokesh of his "honorable discharge" status as a result of his conduct.

Supporters of Kokesh from around the country later staged a protest, holding banners and signs in support of Kokesh, and criticizing George W. Bush over the war. Many of the protestors wore red badges bearing the number "3,495", the number of U.S. military deaths in Iraq at the time.

In June 2007, Kokesh, along with IVAW members Liam Madden and Nate Lewis, was arrested for crossing onto Fort Benning during an anti-war protest. A spokesperson for the IVAW said the three had accidentally stepped onto the base while talking to a guard. The trespass charges were dismissed.

=== Ron Paul 2008 presidential campaign ===
On September 2, 2008, Kokesh spoke at Ron Paul's Rally for the Republic in Minneapolis, Minnesota.

=== Thomas Jefferson Memorial silent dance ===
On May 28, 2011, Kokesh and other activists participated in a flash mob-silent dance at the Jefferson Memorial in Washington, D.C., in protest of a recent ruling against dancing within the monument.

Kokesh, along with four others including Medea Benjamin of Code Pink, were arrested by the U.S. Park Police for demonstrating without a permit. Kokesh was told he was under arrest after dancing a jig. He refused officers orders and was subsequently violently body-slammed onto the marble floor, put in a choke hold, then cuffed. The aggressive nature of the arrests raised concerns about the actions of some of the officers and prompted an internal investigation by the Park Police.

A much larger protest on June 4 organized by Kokesh and Code Pink involved about 200 protesters and 75 dancers. About 10 minutes after the dancing began, police began clearing the monument. No arrests were made. When asked by a journalist if he had a permit to protest, Kokesh reportedly produced a copy of the Constitution and said, "Actually I got a permit. It's the same one I swore an oath to when I enlisted in the Marine Corps. And it says something about 'freedom of assembly.'"

=== Veterans for Ron Paul (2012) ===
Kokesh was a spokesperson for "Veterans for Ron Paul", a grassroots group in support of the Ron Paul 2012 presidential campaign.

On February 20, 2012, after a "Veterans for Ron Paul" rally organized by Kokesh, 500 marchers, including veterans, active-duty service, and their families, marched towards the White House. There they engaged in ceremonial flag-folding in memory of deceased soldiers and periods of silence for soldiers who died in battle and for those who committed suicide after returning.

=== Cursing ban in Middleborough, Massachusetts ===
On June 26, 2012, Kokesh organized a protest against the decision of Middleborough, Massachusetts, to ban cursing in public with punishment of a $20 fine. Kokesh said efforts to limit citizens' free speech was "more offensive, vulgar and obscene than any curse word."

In October 2012, the decision was overturned by the state's attorney general on the grounds that it was unconstitutional.

=== Open Carry March on Washington ===
In May 2013, Kokesh announced an "Open Carry March on Washington" where thousands of marchers bearing arms would cross from Virginia into Washington, D.C., on Independence Day to protest strict gun laws. He described the event as a nonviolent demonstration to be coordinated with DC law enforcement and that marchers should respond "with Satyagraha" and peacefully turn back if met with force, and should be prepared to "submit to arrest without resisting."

On July 4, 2013, Kokesh posted a YouTube video of himself allegedly loading a shotgun in Freedom Plaza in the District of Columbia in open defiance of DC law. Police indicated they believed he may have used a green screen, though on his return to the plaza on July 8 he insisted data from government surveillance cameras in Freedom Plaza would show he was there.

On the evening of July 9, a U.S. Park Police SWAT team raided Kokesh's house in Herndon, Virginia, executing a search warrant for the shotgun and raw footage from the July 4 video. With helicopters providing air support, the police officers knocked then kicked in the door and lobbed a flash grenade in the foyer, filling the house with smoke. Police clad in body armor stormed in and handcuffed Kokesh and his housemates, who alleged mistreatment during the raid and the ensuing five-hour search, which allegedly turned up the shotgun and Psilocybin mushrooms. Kokesh was charged with possession of Schedule I or II drugs and possession of a gun with Schedule I or II drugs, both felonies. Kokesh refused to leave his cell to be arraigned and fingerprinted, but was arraigned by a judge in his cell the next day.

In a jailhouse interview on July 18 Kokesh denied any connection to the drugs found in the raid, implying they were planted. On the same day, Kokesh announced his plans to run for President of the United States in 2020 on a platform of an orderly dissolution of the U.S. Federal Government.

On July 26, Kokesh posted bail in Virginia and was immediately rearrested by U.S. Park Police for breaking a D.C. law forbidding bearing arms which carries a penalty of up to five years in jail, in connection with his Freedom Plaza video. Magistrate Judge Lori Parker ordered Kokesh to remain in the D.C. jail over the weekend because, she said, he had violated the rules of his release in another case. Specifically, she noted that in June 2013, Kokesh was charged with possession of marijuana after he was arrested on the south side of the White House allegedly smoking a marijuana cigarette. On July 29 D.C. Superior Court Judge Frederick Sullivan, calling Kokesh "a very dangerous man," ordered him to remain in D.C. jail until trial.

On November 6, 2013, Kokesh was released from jail after waiving his right to a trial and pleading guilty to the July 4 weapons charges and a marijuana possession charge from the June 8 White House protest. On January 16, 2014, Kokesh was sentenced to two years of probation.

On June 12, 2014, Kokesh, after entering an Alford plea in Circuit Court to two felonies related to his possession of hallucinogenic mushrooms while possessing a gun, was convicted of drug and gun charges, which he did not contest. In September, Kokesh received a suspended sentence.

=== Protest against the war in Syria ===
In April 2017, Kokesh had organized a demonstration in front of the White House as a protest against the Syrian bombing campaign, but before it could start Kokesh was arrested on an outstanding warrant for failing to appear in court on charges related to him disrupting a TSA security line in Maryland in 2015.

== 2010 New Mexico 3rd Congressional District bid ==
On October 15, 2009, Kokesh filed with the FEC to run for the U.S. House of Representatives from New Mexico's 3rd congressional district as a Republican.

He finished second in the Republican primary with 29 percent of the vote, losing the nomination to businessman Tom Mullins, who went on to lose the November general election to incumbent Democrat Ben Ray Luján.

== FREEDOM! ==
While in jail after his 2013 arrest stemming from his civil disobedience at Freedom Plaza, Kokesh began work on his book FREEDOM!

Kokesh got the idea for the book while reading other libertarian tracts during his stay in jail. The book advocates for the use of cryptocurrency and claims the safest populace is a well-armed one. FREEDOM! was published on Independence Day (July 4) in 2014.

=== Book tours ===
In August 2016, Kokesh embarked on the "For the Love of FREEDOM!" tour. The tour, featuring over 60 stops and including all of the 48 contiguous states, served as an exploratory tour for his 2020 Presidential run. Free copies of his book were given away to all in attendance at each event.

In January 2019, 204,453 copies of FREEDOM! were mailed for free to residents in many neighbourhoods of New Orleans, Louisiana. The distribution cost around US$131,000, which was primarily raised from cryptocurrency-related companies.

== 2020 presidential campaign ==
On July 23, 2013, Kokesh announced his candidacy for U.S. president in 2020 from a jailhouse interview with Fox 5, after he was arrested for the Open Carry incident earlier that month. He stated he was running on the single-issue idea of an "orderly dissolution of the U.S. Federal Government". He was the first Libertarian Party candidate to announce a presidential bid for the 2020 election.

On January 16, 2018, Kokesh reaffirmed his candidacy for president. He was pulled over by Texas Department of Public Safety Troopers twice that day and arrested the second time on marijuana and controlled substance charges. He was bailed out on January 25.

In April 2020, he announced John McAfee, the software developer running his own campaign for the nomination, as his running mate; McAfee also endorsed Kokesh.

Kokesh was eliminated in the second round of the 2020 Libertarian National Convention, and after initially not endorsing a candidate, eventually endorsed Libertarian nominee Jo Jorgensen's campaign after public backlash.

=== Endorsements ===
- Arvin Vohra, endorsed after he was eliminated in primary
- Cynthia McKinney, former Democratic Representative and Green Party politician
- John McAfee, software developer

=== Political positions ===
Kokesh views government as the greatest cause of violence in the world today and believes that governmental coercion is just as undesirable as coercion performed by a private citizen. He believes that government should be abolished in order to reduce violence and build a society based on respect. Kokesh has stated he does not hate the people running the U.S. government, however he believes government has invalidated itself by betraying the principles from which it was founded.

Kokesh ran for President of the United States in 2020 on the platform of an orderly dissolution of the federal government. Kokesh stated that if elected, he would immediately sign his one-and-only executive order to declare the federal government bankrupt and of no authority. He would then resign to become "Custodian of the Federal Government" to oversee the process as a bankruptcy agent. Every federal agency would then either be liquidated, localized to the state level or privatized, over the next four years.

Kokesh supports a non-interventionist foreign policy. Kokesh is a prominent anti-war activist.

== Adam vs. The Man ==
=== Radio ===
Adam vs. The Man was a talk show which was available in a variety of formats, such as AM radio, web-access, podcast and Facebook-linked YouTube channel. Initially airing in 2011 as an evening two-hour broadcast on KIVA AM 1550 talk radio in Albuquerque, New Mexico, Adam vs. The Man then shifted to a half-hour video news format on RT before fully moving to the internet as an hour-long video podcast. On April 7, 2014, AVTM 4.0 was launched from Los Angeles, California, and could be viewed live daily from noon to 2 PM, Pacific Time Zone.

=== RT America ===
Adam vs. The Man was licensed by the Russian affiliated RT America in April 2011.After only a few months on RT, Adam vs. The Man was canceled in August by the network to avoid potential legal problems stemming from a Federal Election Commission complaint filed against RT by the group America's Survival, Inc. over the matter of Kokesh endorsing Ron Paul for President (thereby allegedly running afoul of the Foreign Agents Registration Act).

=== YouTube channel ===
Kokesh routinely uploads activism videos to his YouTube channel, Adam vs. The Man. As of July 2019, the YouTube channel had 248,000 subscribers. Topics include Kokesh's political views, and videos about how to complete a DUI-checkpoint.

In 2015, the Kokesh renamed the channel to Freedom!

As of December 30, 2020, Adam Kokesh's YouTube channel is named "Adam Kokesh"

== Film appearances ==
Kokesh appears in the role of "A Soldier" in the 2016 film The Prey, and as himself in the documentaries The Road to Fallujah (2008), For Liberty: How the Ron Paul Revolution Watered the Withered Tree of Liberty (2009), Owned & Operated (2012), Derrick J's Victimless Crime Spree (2012), ShadowRing (2015), and Gray State: The Rise (2015).

On January 19, 2013, Kokesh appeared as a future version of himself at an anti-war-debt rally scene in the 2014 sci-fi thriller, Alongside Night. Kokesh wrote the speech he delivered, a tribute to the character of Dr. Martin Vreeland (played by Kevin Sorbo), in the background during an action sequence. Most of the speech plays during the movie's end credits and the unedited full speech is on YouTube.

== Electoral history ==
New Mexico U.S. House District 3 Republican primary, 2010
Party	Candidate	Votes	%
Republican	Thomas E. Mullins	23,301	71.3
Republican	Adam C. Kokesh	9,372	28.7
Total votes		32,673	100

== See also ==
- List of peace activists
