= 3rd Civil Affairs Group =

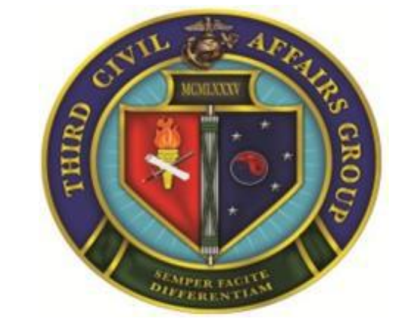
- Active: 2012-present
- Country: United States
- Allegiance: United States of America
- Branch: United States Marine Corps
- Type: Civil Affairs
- Role: Provide civil-military operations support to I MEF or other MAGTF in order to reduce friction between the civilian population and the MEF or other MAGTF.
- Part of: Marine Forces Reserve

Commanders
- Current commander: Colonel Evan B. Hume

3rd Civil Affairs Group (3D CAG) is a civil affairs (CA) unit of the United States Marine Corps based at Naval Station Great Lakes, Illinois. The Marine Corps assigns civil affairs as a primary military specialty for enlisted and additional specialty for officers. The Marine Corps uses its own civil affairs doctrine and runs the Marine Corps Civil-Military Operations School at Marine Corps Base Quantico to train civil affairs Marines.

The Commanding Officer of the 3rd CAG is Colonel Evan B. Hume with Sergeant Michael D. Grant as The 3rd CAG Sergeant Major.

3D CAG has taken part in Operation Balikatan, Cobra Gold, Korea United, and various other global operations. The CAG is made up of 3 detachments made up of Marines from all backgrounds.

== History ==
3D CAG as it exists today was founded in 2012. Originally, 3rd CAG was stood up in 1985 at Chavez Ravine the location of Naval and Marine Corps Reserve Center, Los Angeles, California. The unit relocated to Camp Pendleton following the Northridge earthquake in January 1993.

Some of its history is associated with 1st Civil Affairs Group.

== Mission ==
3D CAG's mission is as follows: "Plan and execute civil military operations while serving as the liaison between military forces and civil authorities, the local population and non-governmental organizations. Conduct activities which enhance the relationship between the military and host nation personnel and organizations facilitated through application of civil affairs specialty skills in areas normally the responsibility of civil governments."
