= Results of the 2020 Libertarian Party presidential primaries =

This article contains the results of the 2020 Libertarian Party presidential primaries and caucuses, non-binding electoral contests by various state affiliates of the Libertarian Party held to gauge support for Libertarian presidential candidates prior to the 2020 Libertarian National Convention.

== Results summary table ==
Date	Contest	2020 Libertarian Party presidential primaries (Note: In the below table, blank cells indicate the candidate was not a ballot option or approved write-in candidate. Shaded cells indicate withdrawn candidates.)												Source
Date	Contest	Jo Jorgensen	Jacob Hornberger	Vermin Supreme	Adam Kokesh	Dan Behrman	Sam Robb	Ken Armstrong	Kim Ruff	Max Abramson	None of the above	Others	Total	Source
January 11	New; Hampshire	17 (12.1%)	9 (6.4%)	26 (18.6%)	1 (0.7%)	13 (9.3%)	8 (5.7%)	5 (3.6%)	22 (15.7%)	1 (0.7%)	13 (9.3%)	25 (Note: Mark Whitney: 6 (4.3%), Arvin Vohra: 6 (4.3%), Lincoln Chafee: 4 (2.9%), Justin Amash: 3 (2.1%), Keenan Dunham: 2 (1.4%), "Straw Poll": 1 (0.7%), Joe Bishop-Henchman: 1 (0.7%), Thomas Knapp: 1 (0.7%), Nicholas Sarwark: 1 (0.7%)) (17.7%)	140	
February 8	Iowa	18 (6.4%)	133 (47.3%)	9 (3.2%)	17 (6.1%)	14 (5.0%)	7 (2.5%)	2 (0.7%)		6 (2.1%)	8 (2.9%)	67 (Note: Lincoln Chafee: 36 (12.8%), John McAfee: 10 (3.7%), Write-in: 8 (2.9%), Mark Whitney: 4 (1.4%), Arvin Vohra: 3 (1.1%), Keenan Dunham: 2 (0.7%), Souraya Faas: 2 (0.7%), Benjamin Leder: 1 (0.4%), John Monds: 1 (0.4%)) (23.8%)	281	
February 25	Minnesota	32 (40.5%)	47 (59.5%)	eliminated	eliminated	eliminated in round 1/7	eliminated	eliminated		eliminated	eliminated		79	
March 3 (Super Tuesday)	California	3,534 (12.4%)	5,530 (19.4%)	3,469 (12.2%)	2,161 (7.6%)	1,695 (5.9%)	1,722 (6.0%)	3,011 (10.6%)	2,330 (8.2%)	1,605 (5.6%)		3,478 (12.2%)	28,535	
March 3 (Super Tuesday)	Massachusetts	141 (3.4%)	369 (8.9%)	399 (9.6%)	125 (3.0%)	294 (7.%)	127 (3.1%)	145 (3.5%)	224 (5.4%)	98 (2.4%)	804 (19.3%)	1,433 (34.5%)	4,159	
March 3 (Super Tuesday)	North; Carolina	267 (4.4%)	584 (9.6%)	387 (6.3%)	163 (2.7%)	144 (2.4%)		346 (5.7%)	469 (7.7%)	160 (2.7%)	2,022 (33.1%)	1,568 (25.7%)	6,110	
March 10	Missouri		1,695 (74.8%)								571 (25.2%)		2,266	
March 16-April 11	Ohio	55 (31.6%)	97 (55.7%)	eliminated in round 8/9	eliminated in round 5/9	eliminated in round 2/9		eliminated in round 7/9			22 (12.6%)		174	
April 25-28	Connecticut	eliminated in round 18/19	85 (50.9%)	eliminated in round 16/19	eliminated in round 17/19	eliminated in round 12/19	eliminated in round 10/19	eliminated in round 7/19			eliminated in round 13/19	82 (49.1%)	167	
April 28	New; York		default winner											
May 12	Nebraska	539 (28.1%)	483 (25.2%)		274 (14.3%)	180 (9.4%)				170 (8.9%)		270 (14.1%)	1,916	
June 2	New Mexico (Note: The New Mexico primary was delayed due to the COVID-19 pandemic, and was therefore held after Jo Jorgensen received the Libertarian Party nomination on May 23.)	520 (33.1%)	154 (9.8%)		124 (7.9%)	58 (3.7%)	90 (5.7%)				330 (21.0%)	281 (18.1%)	1,557	
Popular vote (Percentage)		5,123 (11.2%)	9,186 (20.3%)	4,290 (9.4%)	2,865 (6.3%)	2,398 (5.3%)	1,954 (4.3%)	3,509 (7.7%)	3,045 (6.7%)	2,040 (4.5%)	3,770 (8.3%)		45,389	

== Results by state ==
=== New Hampshire primary ===
Mail-in ballots were due by January 11, at the state convention. The primary was tabulated using Bucklin voting. Percentages shown are percentage of ballots cast.

2020 New Hampshire Libertarian presidential primary
Candidate	1st	2nd	3rd	Total	Percentage
Vermin Supreme	10	3	13	26	17.3%
Kim Ruff	6	9	7	22	14.7%
Jo Jorgensen	5	8	4	17	11.3%
None of the Above (NOTA)	4	6	3	13	8.7%
Dan "Taxation Is Theft" Behrman	0	6	7	13	8.7%
Jacob Hornberger (write-in)	9	0	0	9	6.0%
Sam Robb	1	2	5	8	5.3%
Mark Whitney (write-in)	4	0	2	6	4.0%
Arvin Vohra	1	0	5	6	4.0%
Ken Armstrong	0	2	3	5	3.3%
Lincoln Chafee (write-in)	1	2	1	4	2.7%
Justin Amash (write-in)	1	1	1	3	2.0%
Keenan Wallace Dunham	0	0	2	2	1.3%
Max Abramson	1	0	0	1	nil
Straw Poll (write-in)	1	0	0	1	nil
Joe Bishop-Henchman (write-in)	0	0	1	1	nil
Thomas Knapp (write-in)	0	0	1	1	nil
Adam Kokesh (write-in)	0	0	1	1	nil
Nicholas Sarwark (write-in)	0	0	1	1	nil
Exhausted Ballots/Undervotes	0	5	5	10	
Total	44	44	62	150	

2020 New Hampshire Libertarian vice presidential primary
Candidate	1st	2nd	Total	Percentage
John Phillips	15	6	21	63.6%
None of the Above	9	6	15	45.5%
Spike Cohen (write-in)	2	0	2	6.1%
Larry Sharpe (write-in)	2	0	2	6.1%
Ron Paul (write-in)	1	1	2	6.1%
Darryl W Perry (write-in)	1	0	1	3.0%
Straw Poll (write-in)	1	0	1	3.0%
Nicolas Sarwark (write-in)	1	0	1	3.0%
Mark Whitney (write-in)	1	0	1	3.0%
Exhausted Ballots/Undervotes	11	20	31	
Total	44	33	77	

=== Iowa caucuses ===
The Libertarian Party of Iowa conducted their caucuses on February 8, offering in-person caucus locations and an online virtual caucus. Only registered Libertarians were eligible to participate.

Iowa Libertarian presidential caucus, February 8, 2020
Candidate	Votes	Percentage
Jacob Hornberger	133	47.3%
Lincoln Chafee	36	12.8%
Jo Jorgensen	18	6.4%
Adam Kokesh	17	6.0%
Daniel Behrman	14	5.0%
John McAfee	10	3.6%
Vermin Supreme	9	3.2%
None of the Above	8	2.8%
Write In	8	2.8%
Sam Robb	7	2.5%
Max Abramson	6	2.1%
Mark Whitney	4	1.4%
Arvin Vohra	3	1.1%
Ken Armstrong	2	nil
Souraya Faas	2	nil
Benjamin Leder	1	nil
John Monds	1	nil
Total	281	100%

County results —Iowa.: Ken Armstrong Dan "Taxation is Theft" Behrman Lincoln Chafee Jacob Hornberger Jo Jorgensen Adam Kokesh / John McAfee Sam Robb Vermin Supreme Tie No votes

=== Minnesota caucuses ===
The Libertarian Party of Minnesota used ranked-choice voting to tabulate the results of their caucus. After 7 rounds, Jacob Hornberger was declared the winner.

Minnesota Libertarian presidential caucus, February 25, 2020
Candidate	Round 1			Round 7	
Candidate	Votes	%	Transfer	Votes	%
Jacob Hornberger	37	38.1%	+ 10	47	59.5%
Jo Jorgensen	12	12.4%	+ 20	32	40.5%
Vermin Supreme	11	11.3%	11	Eliminated	
Adam Kokesh	6	6.2%	6	Eliminated	
John Monds	6	6.2%	6	Eliminated	
Lincoln Chafee	6	6.2%	6	Eliminated	
Mark Whitney	6	6.2%	6	Eliminated	
N.O.T.A.	4	4.1%	4	Eliminated	
Arvin Vohra	2	2.1%	2	Eliminated	
Ken Armstrong	2	2.1%	2	Eliminated	
Sam Robb	2	2.1%	2	Eliminated	
Keenan Wallace Dunham	1	1.0%	1	Eliminated	
Sorinne Ardeleanu	1	1.0%	1	Eliminated	
Abrahamson (write-in)	1	1.0%	1	Eliminated	
Dan "Taxation is Theft" Behrman	0	nil	Eliminated		
Jedi Hill	0	nil	Eliminated		
Souraya Faas	0	nil	Eliminated		
Steven Richey	0	nil	Eliminated		
Round 1 Total	97	100%	Round 7 Total	79	100%

Minnesota Libertarian vice presidential caucus, February 25, 2020
Candidate	Round 1			Round 2	
Candidate	Votes	%	Transfer	Votes	%
Jeff Wood	32	40.0%	+ 0	32	52.5%
Spike Cohen	29	36.3%	+ 0	29	47.5%
NOTA	19	23.8%	19	Eliminated	
Round 1 Total	80	100%	Round 2 Total	61	100%

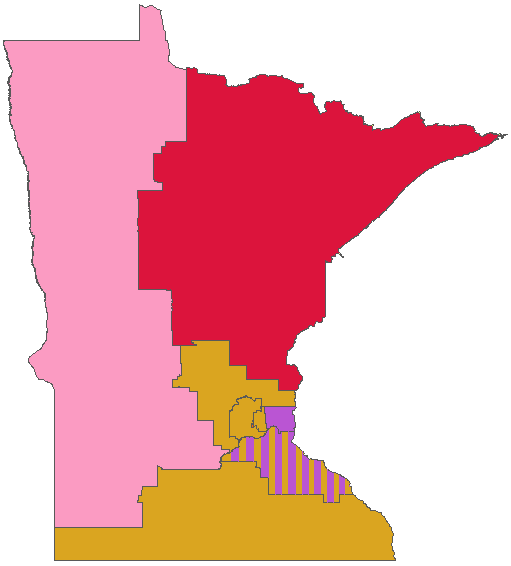
Results by Congressional District —Minnesota. Lincoln Chafee Jacob Hornberger Jo Jorgensen Vermin Supreme

=== California primary ===
California Libertarian presidential primary, March 3, 2020
Candidate	Votes	Percentage
Jacob Hornberger	5,530	19.4%
Jo Jorgensen	3,534	12.4%
Vermin Supreme	3,469	12.2%
Ken Armstrong	3,011	10.6%
Kim Ruff (withdrawn)	2,330	8.2%
Adam Kokesh	2,161	7.6%
Sam Robb	1,722	6.0%
Dan Behrman	1,695	5.9%
Max Abramson	1,605	5.7%
Souraya Faas	999	3.5%
Steven A Richey	982	3.4%
Erik Chase Gerhardt	748	2.6%
Keenan Wallace Dunham	720	2.5%
Sorinne Ardeleanu (write-in)	27	nil
Geby Eva Espínosa (write-in)	2	nil
Nicholas D'Artagnan Dumas (write-in)	0	nil
James Orlando Ogle (write-in)	0	nil
Total	28,535	100%

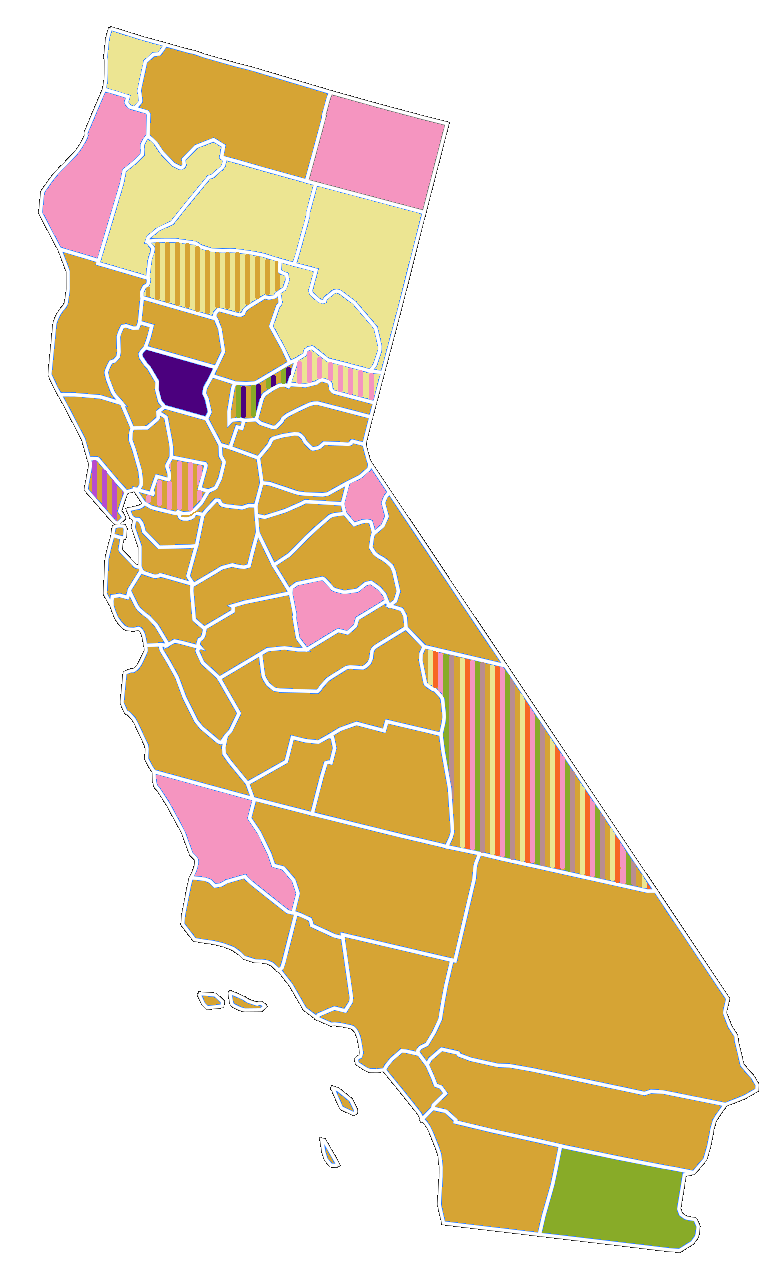
County results —California: Ken Armstrong Dan "Taxation is Theft" Behrman Jacob Hornberger / Erik Gerhardt Sam Robb Vermin Supreme Jo Jorgensen

=== Massachusetts primary ===
Massachusetts Libertarian presidential primary, March 3, 2020
Candidate	Votes	Percentage
No Preference	804	19.3%
Vermin Love Supreme (Note: No preference received the most votes in Massachusetts. Supreme, the candidate who had received the most votes, was recognized as the winner by the Secretary of State. This is unlike what happened in North Carolina, where Hornberger was not recognized as the winner.)	399	9.6%
Jacob George Hornberger	369	8.9%
Blanks	324	7.8%
Dan Taxation Is Theft Behrman	294	7.1%
Kimberly Margaret Ruff (withdrawn)	224	5.4%
Arvin Vohra	151	3.6%
Kenneth Reed Armstrong	145	3.5%
Jo Jorgensen	141	3.4%
Samuel Joseph Robb	127	3.1%
Adam Kokesh	125	3.0%
Max Abramson	98	2.4%
All Others	958	23.0%
Total	4,159	100%

County results —Massachusetts. No preference Jacob Hornberger

No Preference percentage by county —Massachusetts.: 11% 14% 17% 18% / 19% 21% 22% 23%

=== North Carolina primary ===
North Carolina Libertarian presidential primary, March 3, 2020
Candidate	Votes	Percentage
No Preference	2,022	33.1%
Jacob Hornberger	584	9.6% (Note: No preference received the most votes in North Carolina. Hornberger, the candidate who had received the most votes, was not recognized as the winner. This is unlike what happened in Massachusetts, where Supreme was recognized as the winner.)
John McAfee	550	9.0%
Kim Ruff (withdrawn)	469	7.7%
Vermin Supreme	387	6.3%
Ken Armstrong	346	5.7%
Jo Jorgensen	267	4.4%
Steve Richey	227	3.7%
James Orlando Ogle	207	3.4%
Souraya Faas	169	2.8%
Adam Kokesh	163	2.7%
Max Abramson	160	2.6%
Dan Behrman	144	2.4%
Kenneth Blevins	122	2.0%
Jedidiah Hill	117	1.9%
Erik Gerhardt	99	1.6%
Arvin Vohra	77	1.3%
Total	6,110	100%

County results —North Carolina.: None of the above Tie Vermin Supreme Ken Armstrong Jedidiah Hill / Dan Behrman Jo Jorgensen Steve Richey Kim Ruff No votes

=== Missouri primary ===
Missouri Libertarian presidential primary, March 10, 2020
Candidate	Votes	Percentage
Jacob Hornberger	1,693	74.6%
Uncommitted	577	25.4%
Total	2,270	100%

County results —Missouri. Jacob Hornberger Uncommitted Tie No votes

=== Ohio caucus ===
Online voting took place from March 16 to April 11, with 192 participants. The primary was tabulated using instant runoff voting. Percentages shown are percentage of ballots cast.

Ohio Libertarian presidential caucus
Candidate	Round 1			Round 2			Round 3			Round 4			Round 5			Round 6			Round 7			Round 8	
Candidate	Votes	%	Transfer	Votes	%	Transfer	Votes	%	Transfer	Votes	%	Transfer	Votes	%	Transfer	Votes	%	Transfer	Votes	%	Transfer	Votes	%
Jacob Hornberger	61	31.8%	+ 0	61	31.8%	+ 0	61	31.8%	+ 5	66	34.4%	+ 3	69	35.9%	+ 7	76	39.6%	+ 8	84	43.8%	+ 13	97	50.5%
Jo Jorgensen	24	12.5%	+ 0	24	12.5%	+ 2	26	13.5%	+ 1	27	14.1%	+ 6	33	17.2%	+ 5	38	19.8%	+ 8	46	24.0%	+ 9	55	28.6%
NOTA	9	4.7%	+ 0	9	4.7%	+ 0	9	4.7%	+ 0	9	4.7%	+ 0	9	4.7%	+ 1	10	5.2%	+ 2	12	6.3%	+ 10	22	11.5%
Vermin Supreme	33	17.2%	+ 0	33	17.2%	+ 2	35	18.2%	+ 3	38	19.8%	+ 1	39	20.3%	+ 2	41	21.4%	+ 2	43	22.4%	43	Eliminated	
Ken Armstrong	18	9.4%	+ 1	19	9.9%	+ 0	19	9.9%	+ 0	19	9.9%	+ 1	20	10.4%	+ 2	22	11.5%	22	Eliminated				
Lincoln Chafee (withdrew during the voting period)	18	9.4%	+ 0	18	9.4%	+ 0	18	9.4%	+ 0	18	9.4%	+ 1	19	9.9%	19	Eliminated							
Mark Whitney	11	5.7%	+ 0	11	5.7%	+ 1	12	6.3%	+ 0	12	6.3%	12	Eliminated										
Adam Kokesh	11	5.7%	+ 0	11	5.7%	+ 0	11	5.7%	11	Eliminated													
Dan Taxation is Theft Behrman	6	3.1%	+ 0	6	3.1%	6	Eliminated																
Steve Richey	1	nil	1	Eliminated																			
Round 1 Total	192	100%	Round 2 Total	192; 0 exhausted	100%	Round 3 Total	191; 1 exhausted	99.5%	Round 4 Total	189; 3 exhausted	98.4%	Round 5 Total	189; 3 exhausted	98.4%	Round 6 Total	187; 5 exhausted	97.4%	Round 7 Total	185; 7 exhausted	96.4%	Round 8 Total	174; 18 exhausted	90.6%

County results of the 2020 Libertarian presidential caucus: None of the above Jacob Hornberger Vermin Supreme Ken Armstrong Mark Whitney / Jo Jorgensen Lincoln Chafee Adam Kokesh No votes

=== Connecticut primary ===
Voting took place from April 25–28, 2020.

Connecticut Libertarian presidential caucus
Candidate	Round 1			Round 19	
Candidate	Votes	%	Transfer	Votes	%
Jacob Hornberger	47	31.7%	+ 48	85	66.9%
James P. Gray	23	13.8%	+ 19	42	33.1%
Jo Jorgensen	18	10.8%	34	Eliminated in round 18	
Adam Kokesh	14	8.4%	22	Eliminated in round 17	
Vermin Supreme	14	8.4%	16	Eliminated in round 16	
Brian Ellison	6	3.6%	11	Eliminated in round 15	
Souraya Faas	4	2.4%	8	Eliminated in round 14	
N.O.T.A	8	4.2%	8	Eliminated in round 13	
Dan Behrman	5	3.0%	5	Eliminated in round 12	
Sorinne Ardeleanu	4	2.4%	5	Eliminated in round 11	
Sam Robb	4	2.4%	5	Eliminated in round 10	
Arvin Vohra	4	2.4%	4	Eliminated in round 9	
John Monds	4	2.4%	4	Eliminated in round 8	
Ken Armstrong	1	nil	3	Eliminated in round 7	
Phil Gray	2	1.2%	2	Eliminated in round 6	
Steve Richey	1	nil	1	Eliminated in round 5	
Erik Gerhardt	1	nil	1	Eliminated in round 4	
Jedidiah Hill	1	nil	1	Eliminated in round 3	
Louis Vanacore	1	nil	1	Eliminated in round 2	
Kenneth Blevins, James Ogle, Rhett Smith	0	nil	0	Eliminated in round 1	
Round 1 Total	167	100%	Round 9 Total	167 (40 exhausted)	100%

=== Nebraska primary ===
Nebraska Libertarian presidential primary, March 3, 2020
Candidate	Votes	Percentage
Jo Jorgensen	508	27.8%
Jacob Hornberger	444	24.3%
Adam Kokesh	263	14.4%
Lincoln Chafee (withdrawn)	254	13.9%
Max Abramson (withdrawn)	182	10.0%
Dan Behrman	177	9.7%
Total	1,828	100%

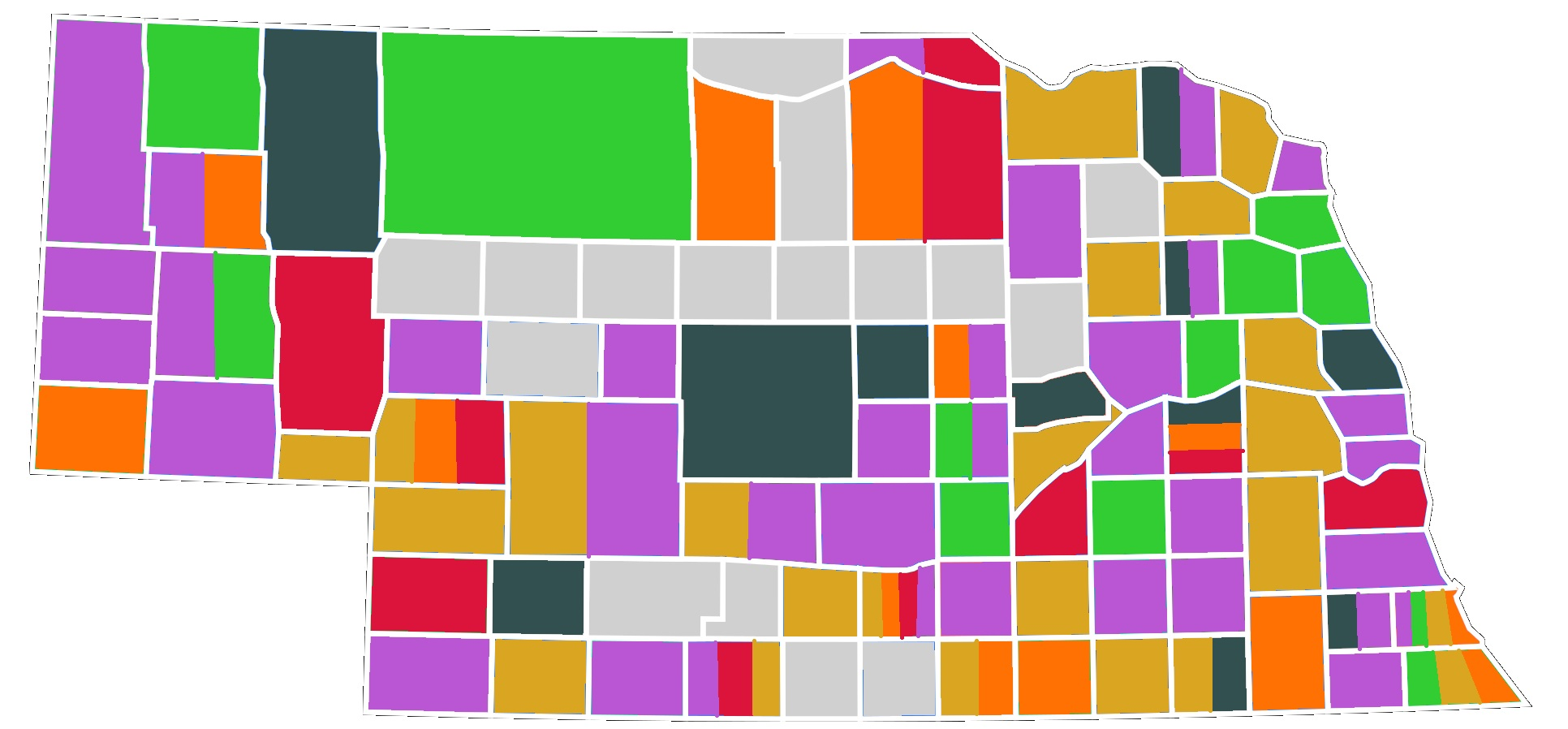
County results — Nebraska.: Jo Jorgensen Jacob Hornberger Adam Kokesh Lincoln Chafee / Max Abramson Dan Behrman No votes

=== New Mexico primary ===
New Mexico Libertarian presidential primary, June 2, 2020
Candidate	Votes	Percentage
Jo Jorgensen	520	33.1%
Uncommitted	330	21.0%
Lincoln Chafee (withdrawn)	158	10.1%
Jacob Hornberger (withdrawn)	154	9.8%
Adam Kokesh (withdrawn)	124	7.9%
Sam Robb (withdrawn)	90	5.7%
John Monds (withdrawn)	63	4.0%
Dan Behrman (withdrawn)	58	3.7%
Arvin Vohra (withdrawn)	39	2.5%
James Ogle (withdrawn)	34	2.2%
Total	1,557	100%

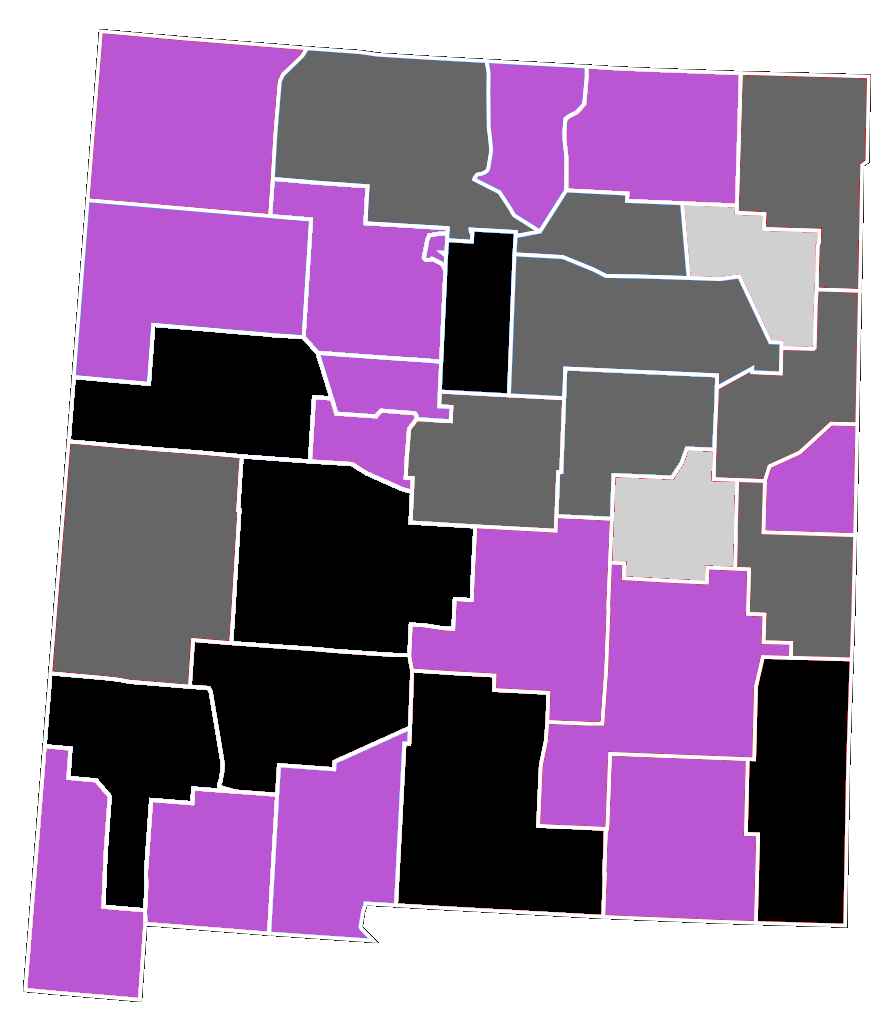
2020 New Mexico Libertarian presidential primary county results

Jo Jorgensen
Uncommitted
Tie
No votes

== See also ==
- 2020 Libertarian National Convention
- 2020 Libertarian Party presidential primaries
- 2020 United States presidential election
