= Gita Lenz =

Gita Lenz (October 1910–January 20, 2011) was an American born New York photographer whose imagery ranged from the humanist to the abstract.

== Personal life and early career ==
Gita Lenz lived for more than sixty years in Greenwich Village on the corner of Carmine and 7th Avenue. She married twice; widowed by her first husband George Zoul’s death fighting Franco's forces in the Spanish Civil War, she married her second husband, Richard Lenz, in 1940 and divorced him eighteen months later. There were no children from either marriage.

Now on her own, an amateur photographer in the 1940s, Lenz strove to find professional work from commercial and editorial clients and was quite successful through the 50s and 60s. Her subject matter was the city and the urban life and environment around her with social documentary, reminiscent of that by Walker Evans and Helen Levitt, being her initial focus before an interest in abstraction emerged. It was her fine art photography that brought her considerable attention.

== Recognition ==
In 1951, following the success of the exhibition Abstract Painting and Sculpture in America at the Museum of Modern Art, Edward Steichen curated its photographic follow-up Abstraction in Photography, introducing “work of photographers concerned with evolving another reality by probing into the realm of the abstract.” Lenz’s pictures shared the walls beside those of Erwin Blumenfeld, Josef Breitenbach, Alexey Brodovitch, Harry Callahan, Henri Cartier-Bresson, Ralston Crawford, Walker Evans, Lotte Jacobi, György Kepes, László Moholy-Nagy, Man Ray, Charles Sheeler, Arthur Siegel, Aaron Siskind, Frederick Sommer, Alfred Stieglitz, Paul Strand and Edward Weston.

A major exhibition of Lenz’s work was in a three-person show, The Third Eye with John Reed and Don Normark, at the Brooklyn Museum of Art in 1952. In 1955, Steichen included her work, a picture of a little girl asleep in the sun, in another exhibition at the MoMA, this time in the world-touring The Family of Man, which was seen by 9 million visitors around the world.

Lenz continued taking photographs into the early 1960s, much of it fine art but with some commercial commissions for photo stories, one on the New York cab industry, another for Standard Oil, with other series on coal miners, city children and botanical gardens, amongst formal portraits. However, her financial situation forced her to seek a more reliable income in copywriting, proofreading and research positions. Though she was still photographing views from her apartment window, gradually she abandoned photography to pursue a less expensive creative interest in writing, mainly poetry.

== Obscurity and rediscovery ==
With the coming of the millennium, Lenz had been forgotten as a photographer and was living alone in her fifth floor walk-up apartment. When she became dependent on a wheelchair the accommodation became impractical. Neighbour-cum-friend Timothy Bartling (a chef) helped Lenz move into an assisted living facility near her old neighbourhood and looked after her personal affairs. Amongst her belongings he discovered a large archive of photographs that he felt might be valuable and took her in 2002 to meet his friend the photographer Gordon Stettinius during his exhibition opening at Robin Rice Gallery. Subsequently, on seeing her imagery and impressed by its quality, Stettinius offered to archive Lenz’s work which he put into storage at his home in Richmond, Virginia. In 2006 he asked expert friends at Virginia Commonwealth University to assist in sorting through the disorganised mass of negatives, prints and documents.

Stettinius sought institutions, galleries, museums and publishers who might be interested in her discovery. Among her papers was correspondence with Aaron Siskind, a friend whom she described as ‘great man’, but given the state of Lenz’ fading memory few other details of her career emerged. Most importantly, her work is quite an early example of the abstraction that Siskind promoted in photography. Stettinius approached the Aaron Siskind Foundation to seek further connections between the two artists and there met Charles Traub, president of the Board of Directors of the foundation, who connected him to Tom Gitterman of Gitterman Gallery in New York, with the prospect of an exhibition by the newly rediscovered photographer’s work.

Stettinius founded Candela Books and its first publication was the monograph on Lenz, for which he wrote an introduction. It was published in conjunction with the exhibition from September 23 to November 20, 2010 at Gitterman Gallery, which preceded the death of Gita Lenz, at 100, only by months.

== Links ==
- Gordon Stettinius (2011) Gita Lenz: New York Views. The mid-century photographer’s long neglected work is gaining new recognition. Places Journal April 2011.
- Gordon Stettinius: Gita Lenz Blog
