= Don Normark =

American photographer (1928–2014)

Donald V. Normark (April 26, 1928 – June 5, 2014) was an American photographer best known for his photographic documentation of Chávez Ravine, a Mexican-American community in Los Angeles, California, taken in 1949 shortly before its demolition to make way for Dodger Stadium.

Born in Sedro-Woolley, Washington, Normark grew up in Washington State. He pursued photography classes while serving in US Marine Corps at El Toro Marine Base, taking night courses at Anaheim Junior College, and later studied photography at the Art Center School in Pasadena, California. In 1949, while exploring Los Angeles, he discovered Chávez Ravine, a rural settlement comprising the neighbourhoods of La Loma, Bishop and Palo Verde. He photographed its residents, homes and everyday life, producing an extensive visual record of the community before its displacement to make way for Dodger Stadium. Shortly after he completed his work, the residents were evicted and the neighborhood was destroyed. The Battle of Chavez Ravine lasted until 1961 and resulted in the complete removal of all inhabitants.

Normark subsequently worked as a freelance photographer, contributing many photographs to the magazine Sunset over approximately three decades. He also worked for Look magazine and studied with photographer Minor White.

In 1999, his book Chavez Ravine, 1949: A Los Angeles Story was published. It collects interviews and his photographs documenting the Ravine's culture at the time. A 2005 PBS documentary directed by Jordan Mechner made use of the Normark photos in telling the story of how a Mexican American community was destroyed, thinking their community was going to be replaced with a low-income public housing project, however it was replaced with Dodger Stadium. As a soundtrack to the film the director used Chávez Ravine, a concept album recorded by Ry Cooder. Norman also worked as a travel phptpgrapher. In Africa he met Jane Goodall and documented her work. He was a member of the Society of American Travel Writers and served a term as its president. In 1985 he was selected through the Bill Muster Showcase as their Photographer of the Year.

Normark married Priscilla Stokes, with whom he had two children. He spent his later years in Seattle, Washington, where he continued writing and reflecting on his photographic career. He died in Seattle on June 5, 2014, aged 86.

== Collections ==
His photographs have been exhibited at several institutions including the Los Angeles County Museum of Art, the J. Paul Getty Museum and the Santa Barbara Museum of Art. Several collections hold his photographs in their permanent collection:

- Brooklyn Museum
- Massachusetts Institute of Technology (MIT)
- Smithsonian Institution
- George Eastman Museum
- Princeton University Art Museum

== Orbituaries ==
- Don Normark, who photographed Chavez Ravine residents, dies at 86 by Elaine Woo (Los Angeles Times)
- Photographer Don Normark, Who Got to Dodgers Stadium Before It Did, Dies at 86 by Jen Graves (The Stranger)
