= Naval and Marine Corps Reserve Center =

California historic landmark

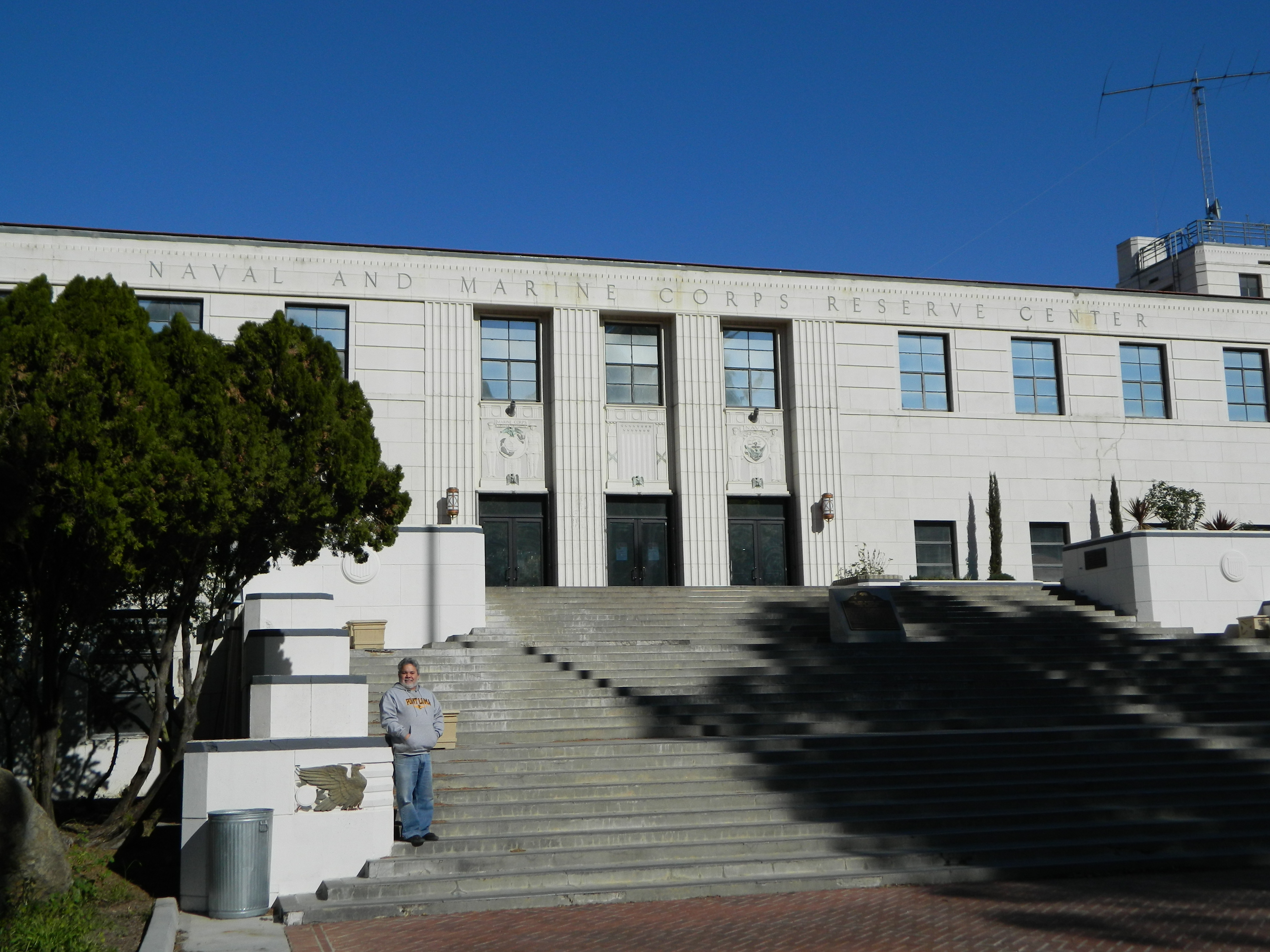
- Naval and Marine Corps Reserve Center Los Angeles, now The Frank Hotchkin Memorial Training Center

- Location within the Los Angeles metropolitan area
- 34°04′11″N 118°14′33″W
- Location: 1700 Stadium Way, Los Angeles, CA 90012

History
- Built: 1938

California Historical Landmark
- Designated: Sept. 19, 1989.
- Reference no.: 972

The Naval and Marine Corps Reserve Center was built between 1938 and 1941 by the Works Progress Administration (WPA) in the Art Deco style as part of the "New Deal". The Naval and Marine Corps Reserve Center was designated a California Historic Landmark (No.972) on Sept. 19, 1989. The site is currently known as the Frank Hotchkin Memorial Training Center and serves as the training center for the Los Angeles Fire Department. The Naval and Marine Corps Reserve Center is located just north of Downtown Los Angeles in Chavez Ravine, next to Dodger Stadium at 1700 Stadium Way. The Naval and Marine Corps Reserve Center was the second Navy Reserve Center built in the United States. During its operation it was the largest Reserve Center, training over 250,000 sailors and Marines. The main building is two-stories tall and has 90,000 square-feet of floor space. The United States Armed Forces ended operations in the building in 1995. Naval and Marine Corps Reserve Center was built with a pool, damage control training room, rifle range and the mock up of a deck of a ship, a space that looked and worked like a sea vessel. The "deck of the ship" has World War II antiaircraft guns and cannons. During World War II 20,000 sailors were trained at the center. California architects Robert Clements and Associates declared the building "Designed as the largest enclosed structure without walls". The 1st Civil Affairs Group was activated June 6, 1985, originally as 3rd Civil Affairs Group, and stationed at Naval and Marine Corps Reserve Center in Los Angeles, between 1987 and 1988, the group recruited and trained Marines to fulfill its mission of providing civil affairs support to active forces in training exercises in the United States and overseas. In 1988 the 1st Civil Affairs Group moved to Marine Corps Base Camp Pendleton.

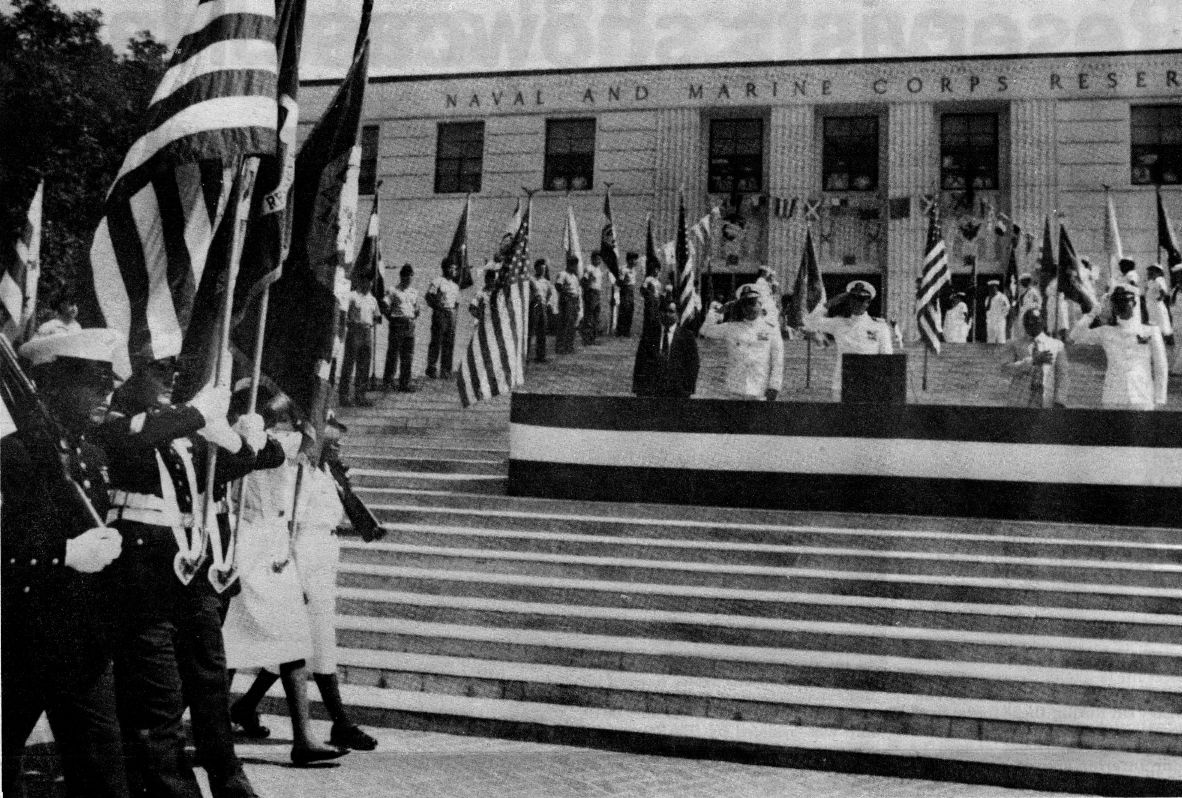
Reopening ceremony of the Naval and Marine Corps Reserve Center Los Angeles in August 1986, after fire repairs

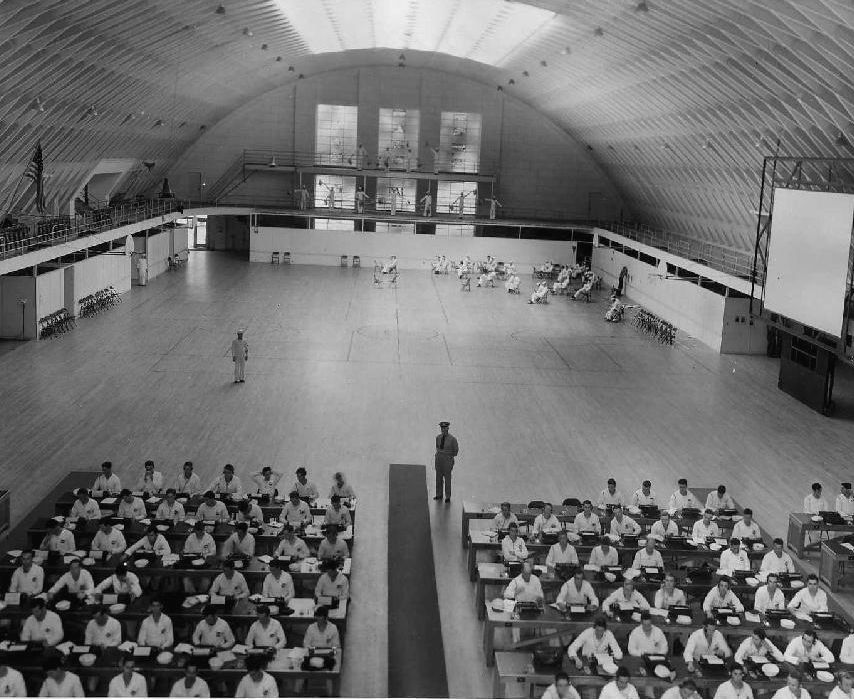
Main hall of the Naval and Marine Corps Reserve Center in 1941

== Frank Hotchkin Memorial Training Center ==
Naval and Marine Corps Reserve Center is now the training center for the Los Angeles Fire Department. The training center was named after LAFD firefighter Frank Hotchkin (July 17, 1956 – Sept. 27, 1980), who died during a fire on September 27, 1980, after falling through a roof of the Naval and Marine Corps Reserve Center. Frank Hotchkin and other firefighters were on the roof cutting vent holes the building to reduce smoke and spread of the fire. The roof had been weakened by the fire and collapsed. Four other firefighters were injured in the firefight. The funeral service for Frank Hotchkin was at St. David's Episcopal Church in North Hollywood. Hotchkin was interred at Forest Lawn Memorial-Park in Hollywood Hills. Over 700 firefighters in uniform attended the service. Hotchkin was stationed at Fire Station 1 on Pasadena Avenue. The fire had been burning for 2 hours before the fire department arrived. It took 2 hours and about 160 firefighters to put out the Reserve Center fire, which resulted in roughly $500,000 in damage. Destroyed or damaged at the center were the banquet hall, admiral quarters, rifle range, the indoor pool and 40 years of centers documents. Trailers were set up to house up to 500 reservists in training. The repairs took six years and cost $4.5 million. The main center building did not reopen until August 1986.

The training facility has on display a pylon from the New York World Trade Center in memory of the Firefighters lost in the attacks on September 11, 2001.

The site has been used for many motion pictures and television shoots.

The FHMC is where the official weather readings for Downtown Los Angeles are taken, effective May 20, 2024.

== Marker ==
Marker on the site reads:

- NO. 972 NAVY AND MARINE CORPS RESERVE CENTER – Designed as the largest enclosed structure without columns in the world by noted California architects Robert Clements and Associates, this Art Deco building, constructed between 1938 and 1941 by the WPA, is the largest and second-oldest Navy Reserve Center in the United States. It has served as the induction, separation, and training center for more than 100,000 sailors since World War II well as the filming site for countless motion pictures and television shows.

== See also ==
- California Historical Landmarks in Los Angeles County
- List of California Ranchos
- Ranchos of Los Angeles County, California
- California during World War II
