= Battle of Chavez Ravine =

Removal of resident population of Chavez Ravine before Dodger Stadium was constructed

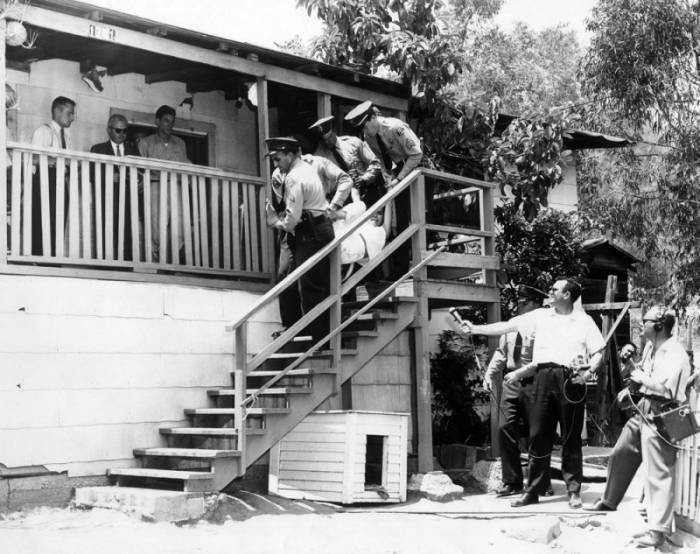
Los Angeles County Sheriffs forcibly evicting Aurora Vargas from her home on Malvina Avenue in Chávez Ravine; May 9, 1959.

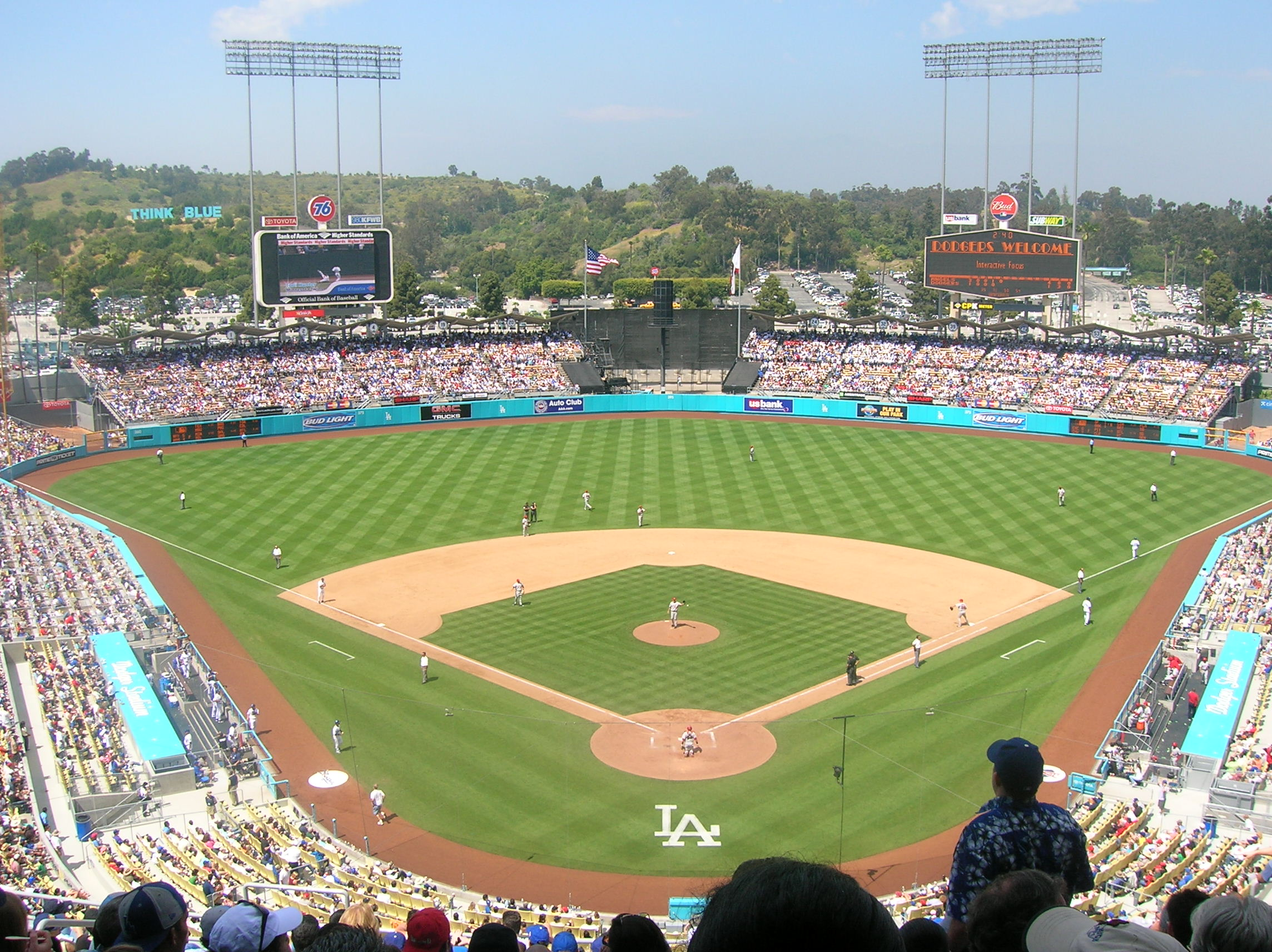
Dodger Stadium in Chavez Ravine

The Battle of Chavez Ravine refers to resistance to the government acquisition of land largely owned by Mexican-Americans in Los Angeles' Chavez Ravine. The efforts to repossess the land, which lasted approximately ten years (1951–1961), eventually resulted in the removal of the entire population of Chavez Ravine from land on which Dodger Stadium was constructed. The majority of the Chavez Ravine land was initially acquired by eminent domain by the City of Los Angeles to make way for proposed public housing. The public housing plan that had been advanced as politically "progressive" and had resulted in the removal of the Mexican-American landowners of Chavez Ravine was abandoned after the passage of a public referendum prohibiting the original housing proposal and the 1953 election of a conservative Los Angeles mayor opposed to public housing. By 1958, the public housing plans were abandoned and the land was conveyed by the city to the Dodgers. The new plans were advanced to construct Dodger Stadium on the site, and in 1959, the Los Angeles County Sheriff's Department forcefully removed the last residents occupying Chavez Ravine. The "Red Scare" ultimately stopped advancements made by the city to provide more public housing for those of lower income, as public housing was seen as a communist trait. This, in turn, affected both the Dodgers and the Mexican-American community who had been displaced from the promises that the city failed to keep, as the stadium was ultimately built on land formerly slated for public housing.

== History of the community ==
In the first half of the twentieth century, Chavez Ravine was a largely independent, semi-rural Mexican-American community in the suburbs of Los Angeles. The area was split up into three smaller neighborhoods: La Loma, Palo Verde, and Bishop. By 1951, right before the public housing proposal, Chavez Ravine was home to over 1,800 families. The residents of Chavez Ravine were generally poor and relied on farming for income. Many of the families living in Chavez Ravine by the 1950s moved there because of ethnic housing discrimination within the city of Los Angeles. Due to its reputation as a poor, rural area, the neighborhood of Chavez Ravine was viewed as an example of urban decay. Areas seen as suffering from urban blight were targeted by progressive legislation like the National Housing Act of 1949. Even though these areas were often depicted as poor, for Mexican-Americans during this time, the residents were doing well, with a good number of residents owning their own homes. Adding to this notion these residents had what can be described as possessing "community cultural wealth" meaning that, despite the struggle of resources these residents faced, they were almost living on their own terms due to connections and bonds shared within the neighborhood. This shared usage of their knowledge and values allowed them to thrive and push past their struggles despite how the cities viewed it (as slums) in wanting to remove these people out.

== Acquisition for public housing ==
By 1951, Chavez Ravine was slated for redevelopment under the National Housing Act of 1949, which provided federal money to build public housing. The Los Angeles Housing Authority began acquiring the land of Chavez Ravine in 1951 through both voluntary purchases and the exercise of eminent domain. In furtherance of the public housing proposal, the city acquired almost all of the land of Chavez Ravine and razed nearly the entire community over the period from 1952 to 1953. The planned public housing development was entitled "Elysian Park Heights" and was designed by Austrian architect Richard J. Neutra. Planned on 54 acres, the development included 24 thirteen-story towers and 163 low-rises providing nearly 3,600 new low-cost apartments. Social critics of the era have argued that the urban renewal efforts of the 1950s under the National Housing Act often included significant and even dominant elements of racial and ethnic oppression, sometimes reflected in the dispossession of minority landowners in "renewed" areas. Residents were encouraged to sell property through a tiered buy-out scheme that offered increasingly lower amounts to sellers who stalled, exploiting their fear of losing out on the maximum payment. In reality, the prices paid were well below market value. Those who held out were ultimately forcefully removed in 1959 by Los Angeles County Sheriffs.

== Walter O'Malley and the Dodgers ==
Walter O'Malley, who gained full control over the Dodgers organization in 1950, orchestrated the deal that eventually led to the construction of Dodger Stadium in Chavez Ravine between 1959 and 1962. O’Malley instantly had much success with multiple World Series appearances and one World Series championship during the 1950s, while also breaking the color barrier with Jackie Robinson in April 1947. However, Ebbets Field, the home of Brooklyn Dodgers, was quickly becoming outdated. At first, Walter O’Malley desired a new state-of-the-art stadium in Brooklyn, but due to political strife with local officials, O’Malley's plans were rejected. O’Malley ultimately turned his sights west after it was clear that he would not obtain what he wanted in New York. He decided to move the Dodgers to Los Angeles in 1958, almost a decade from the start of the displacement of the Chavez Ravine residents. Not only was O’Malley successful in moving the Dodgers to Los Angeles, but he was also instrumental in moving the New York Giants to San Francisco – decisions that proved to be beneficial for both franchises.

== Resistance to development ==
In 1953 Norris Poulson, a political conservative, was elected mayor of Los Angeles on a platform that included opposition to construction of all new public housing projects. In addition, a public referendum was then passed barring all public housing in Los Angeles. Poulson's election and the referendum resulted in the termination of the "Elysian Park Heights" development. The city also agreed with the federal government to abandon the public housing project with the stipulation that the by then nearly-vacant land be used for a "public purpose." For years the nearly vacant Chavez Ravine land lay unused but for a tiny number of remaining original residents, and the land was offered by the city to various potential developers without success. Eventually, in the late 1950s, the city proposed to Brooklyn Dodgers owner Walter O'Malley that an entirely separate plot of land (a plot not part of or close to Chavez Ravine) be used as the site of a baseball stadium for the Dodgers team, which was exploring a move from Brooklyn's Ebbets Field to Los Angeles. O'Malley declined the original offer, but expressed an interest in Chavez Ravine, which he had seen from the air.

As of September 1957, prior to O’Malley's decision to move west, the territory of Chavez Ravine was still reserved for “public purposes.” On these grounds, the proposal that Chavez Ravine be used for a baseball stadium received considerable backlash. Many did not believe that a professional baseball team was a "public use" required by the Constitution as a limit on the use of eminent domain. Some Los Angeles officials argued that the area should be used to establish a zoo, citing that a zoo would provide “public recreation” to the city. In 1957, the Los Angeles City Council approved the transfer of the land to the Dodgers. This process was halted by a successful petition that established the need for a public vote to decide whether or not the Dodgers could obtain the land. The referendum to stop the land transfer, in June 1958, failed by 25,000 out of 677,000 votes. The city ended up conveying the Chavez Ravine site to the Dodgers for small consideration. Dodger Stadium was then constructed with private funds and remains privately owned.

== Resistance to final evictions ==
There was significant resistance to the eviction by the residents. After nearly 10 years, by 1959 Manuel and Abrana Arechiga (often cited as "Avrana"), with their daughter Aurora Vargas (a war widow, later surnamed Fernandez), were among the last of the tiny number of residents to hold out against the government land acquisition effort undertaken for the original public housing project. Forced removal by the Los Angeles County Sheriff's Department on May 9, 1959, resulted in Vargas' arrest. Vargas was fined and briefly sent to jail for her resistance. Manuel Arechiga was the final holdout, living in a tent on the site of his demolished home for months. Public sympathy for the Arechigas quickly waned, however, when subsequent news reports indicated that the Arechigas owned twelve rental houses elsewhere in Los Angeles. This was, however, a false representation, as it was cousins, relatives, and children who owned these houses. Arechiga eventually relented and accepted the city's offer of $10,500. In the few decades that followed this displacement, there were many efforts made to help and preserve the lasting memory of the Chavez Ravine community. One such example being Judy Baca's Great Wall of Los Angeles, an enormous mural (840m in length and 4m in height) that helps encapsulate how people often try to forget or erase the past of these minorities. Judy Baca including Chavez Ravine in her mural showcasing the iron will of those who resisted this displacement and the legacy that those people left behind them.
