= 1st Civil Affairs Group =

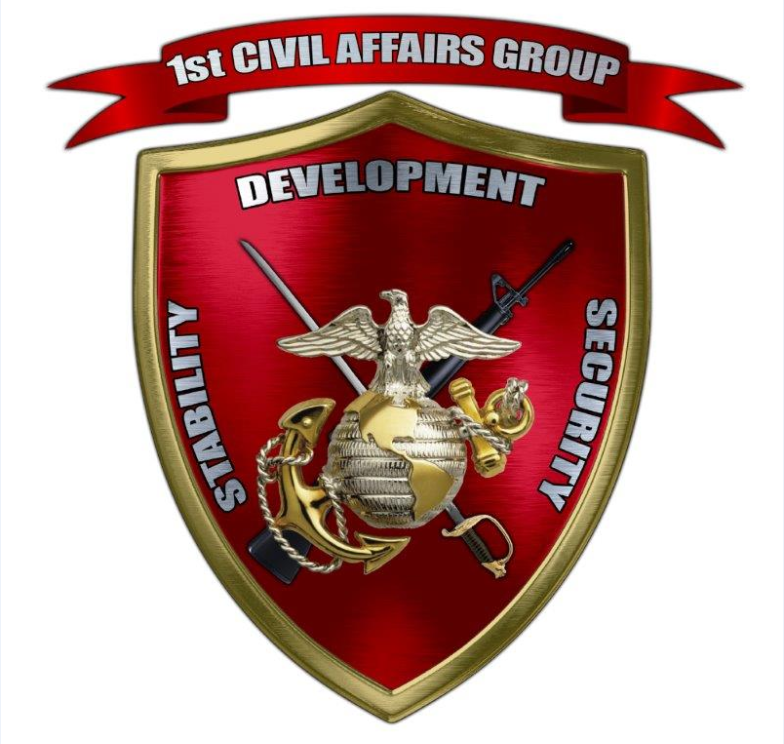
- Active: 1985-present
- Country: United States
- Allegiance: United States of America
- Branch: United States Marine Corps
- Type: Civil Affairs
- Role: Provide civil-military operations support to I MEF or other MAGTF in order to reduce friction between the civilian population and the MEF or other MAGTF.
- Part of: Marine Forces Reserve
- Garrison/HQ: Marine Corps Base Camp Pendleton
- Engagements: Operation Desert Storm; Kosovo Force; Operation Iraqi Freedom

Commanders
- 2026 - Present: Colonel Troy M. Tofflemeyer
- Sergeant Major: SgtMaj Preston D. Silverstein
- 2024-2026: Colonel Michael T. Alderidge
- 2022-2024: Colonel David J. Fennell

1st Civil Affairs Group (1st CAG) is a civil affairs (CA) unit of the United States Marine Corps based at Camp Pendleton, California. It is one of three civil affairs units in the Marine Corps, all of which are reserve units. 1st CAG tends to support I Marine Expeditionary Force activities.

== Mission ==
Plan and execute civil military operations while serving as the liaison between military forces and civil authorities, the local population and non-governmental organizations. Conduct activities which enhance the relationship between the military and host nation personnel and organizations facilitated through application of civil affairs specialty skills in areas normally the responsibility of civil governments.

== History ==
1st CAG was activated 6 June 1985, originally as 3d CAG, at Naval and Marine Corps Reserve Center, Los Angeles. Between 1987 and 1988, the group recruited and trained Marines to fulfill its mission of providing civil affairs support to active forces in training exercises in the United States and overseas.

=== As the 3rd CAG ===
During mid-August 1990, a provisional CA detachment deployed to Saudi Arabia to support I MEF in Southwest Asia for Operation Desert Shield. CA teams worked with I MEF personnel to reduce the chemical threat posed by the extensive chemical storage facilities at the commercial port of Al Jubail. CA Marines assisted in formalizing relations with Saudi civil defense and police forces to coordinate civil and military traffic patterns. In late December the majority of 3rd CAG Marines returned to the United States. The entire 3rd CAG was activated and deployed to Saudi Arabia in January 1991 for Operation Desert Storm. In April 1991, 3rd CAG returned home from deployment and was released from active duty.

In addition to conducting civil affairs activities, 3rd CAG provided limited tactical psychological operations support for mission accomplishment. 3rd CAG also relocated from Los Angeles to Camp Pendleton, California. The unit began providing liaison officers to I MEF, 1st Marine Division, 1st Marine Logistics Group, Marine Expeditionary Units, and the I MEF MAGTF Pacific, increasing 3rd CAG's accessibility and support to fleet units. In the summer of 1994, 3rd CAG proposed a revised table of organization to Headquarters Marine Corps that added a psychological operations planning detachment. 3rd CAG responded to potential hostilities in Iraq in October 1994 by deploying two Marines to Saudi Arabia..

As a reserve unit, 3rd CAG developed programs to better support active duty units to include training and deployments with the 11th MEU, 13th MEU, 15th MEU, and 31st MEU. 3rd CAG assumed the mission of military support to civilian authorities, as a liaison for I MEF.

From November 1995 through February 1996, 3rd CAG operated a displaced civilian refugee camp in Guam for Kurdish refugees during Operation Pacific Haven. The unit supported Operation Joint Guard in Bosnia from June 1997 to January 1999.

In the late 1990s, 3rd CAG Marines and Sailors supported the active components of all branches of the U.S. military during exercises and operations in Thailand, Korea, Kenya, Central America, South America, the Caribbean, Japan, and the United States.

In 2001, 3rd CAG supported civic action programs for United States Southern Command in Central and South America, relying heavily upon the bilingual capabilities of its many Spanish-speaking Marines. 3rd CAG also provided staff planning support to I MEF and its forward operating units engaged in Operation Enduring Freedom, as well as to III MEF in support of exercises in Thailand and Korea. In November 2001, 3rd CAG activated and deployed a detachment of ten Marines to Kosovo to support United Nations peacekeeping operations. In May 2002, a second detachment of ten Marines was deployed to Kosovo. From 2001 to 2003, 3rd CAG also deployed Marines to Kuwait as part of Combined Joint Task Force – Consequence Management (C/JTF-CM), to serve as the primary liaisons between the Task Force and the Kuwaiti national government during Operations Enduring Freedom and then Iraqi Freedom.

==== Iraq War ====
In January 2003, 3rd CAG mobilized for Operation Enduring Freedom and deployed to Kuwait in anticipation of combat operations in Iraq. With the commencement of the ground war in March 2003, 3rd CAG helped restore Iraq's infrastructure and government, concluding its first tour of Operation Iraqi Freedom in September 2003.

In January 2004, 3rd CAG mobilized and deployed for a second tour in Iraq to support I MEF in al-Anbar province and returned to Camp Pendleton in August.

A detachment from 3rd CAG mobilized and deployed to Iraq from January to October 2005 as part of provisional 5th CAG in support of II MEF in al-Anbar. Major Ricardo A. Crocker died on 26 May 2005, from a rocket propelled grenade explosion while conducting combat operations in Hadithah, Iraq.

In December 2005, 3rd CAG mobilized and deployed in March 2006 for a third tour in Iraq to support I MEF in al-Anbar and returned to Camp Pendleton in October 2006.

==== Afghanistan War ====
In 2008, a detachment from 3rd CAG deployed to Afghanistan in support of the Marines in Farah Province and Helmand Province. In 2010, another detachment deployed to Helmand Province in support of II MEF Forward.

=== 1st CAG ===
In 2012, 3d CAG was designated as 1st CAG, to recognize its geographical location complemented by its historical association and relationship with I MEF.

== Unit awards ==
A unit citation or commendation is an award bestowed upon an organization for the action cited. Members of the unit who participated in said actions are allowed to wear on their uniforms the awarded unit citation. 3rd CAG has been presented with the following awards:

| Ribbon | Unit Award |
|---|---|
| | Presidential Unit Citation |
| | Navy Unit Commendation with two Bronze Stars |
| | National Defense Service Medal with one Bronze Star |
| | Southwest Asia Service Medal with three Bronze Stars |
| | Afghanistan Campaign Medal with two Bronze Stars |
| | Iraq Campaign Medal with three Bronze Stars |
| | Global War on Terrorism Service Medal |
