= Chavez Ravine =

Canyon in Los Angeles, California, United States

Coordinates: 34.075°N 118.239°W

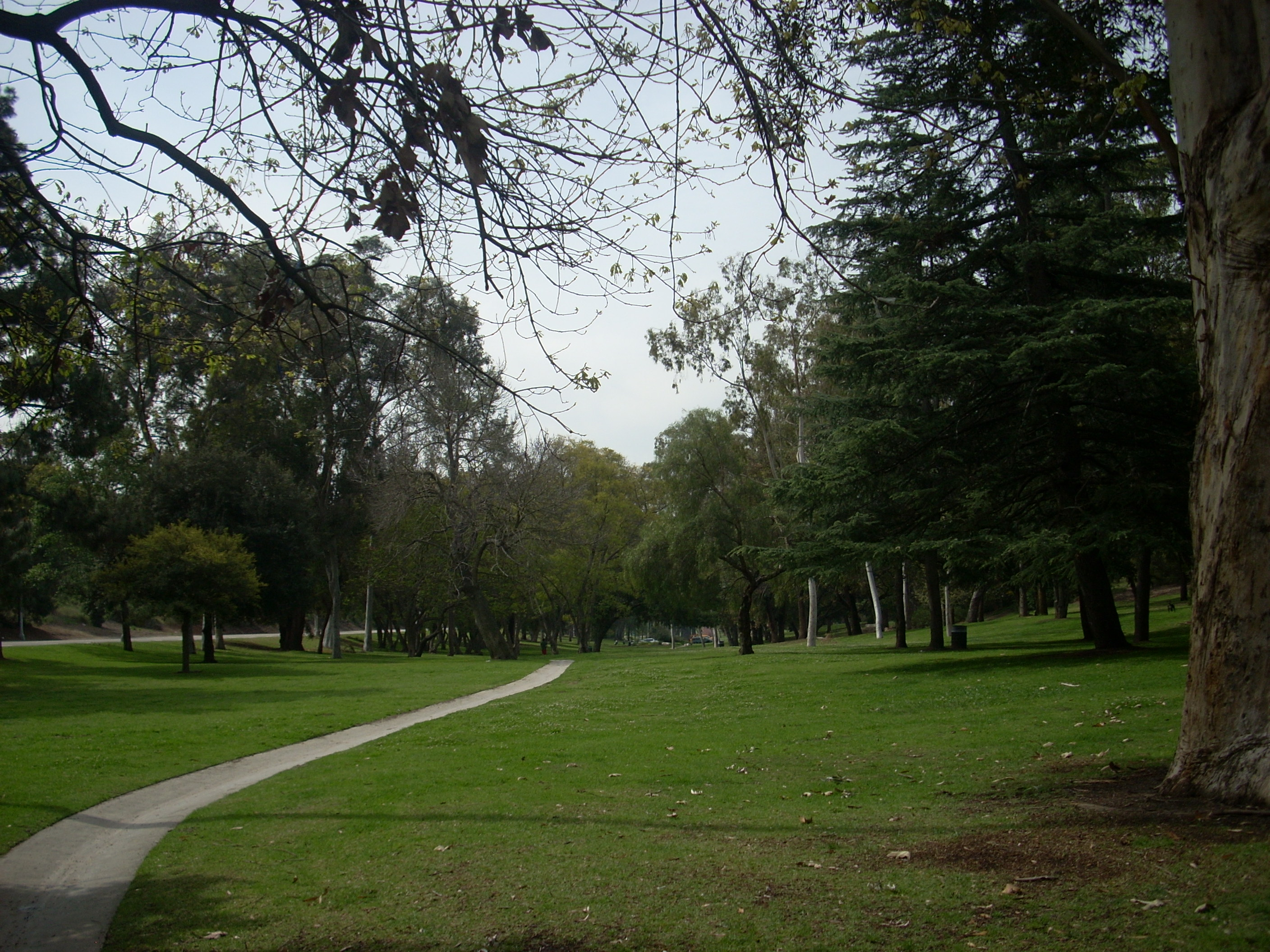
Chavez Ravine Arboretum - Elysian Park - Los Angeles, California

Chavez Ravine, or Chávez Ravine, is a shallow canyon in Los Angeles, California. It sits in a large promontory of hills north of downtown Los Angeles, next to Major League Baseball's Dodger Stadium. Chavez Ravine was named for a 19th-century Los Angeles councilmember who had originally purchased the land in the Elysian Park area.

== History ==
=== 1800s ===
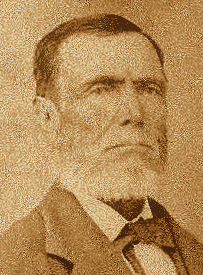
Chavez Ravine is named after 19th century Angeleño politician Julián A. Chávez.

Chavez Ravine was named for Julian Chavez (né Julián A. Chávez), the first recorded owner of the ravine. He was born in New Mexico and moved to Los Angeles in the early 1830s. He quickly became a local leader. In 1844, Chavez purchased 83 acres (34 ha) of the long, narrow valley northwest of the city. There are no records of what Chavez did on his land, but during the 1850s and 1880s there were smallpox epidemics; Chavez Canyon was the location of a "pest house" which cared for Chinese-Americans and Mexican-Americans suffering from the disease.

In addition to the notable Mexican-American presence, there was also a notable early Jewish-American presence in the neighborhood beginning in the 1850s. The First Jewish site in Los Angeles was a Jewish cemetery located in Chavez Ravine, which opened in 1855 and was owned by the Hebrew Benevolent Society of Los Angeles, a Jewish charity which was also the first charity in Los Angeles. The Hebrew Benevolent Society purchased a 3-acre plot of barren land for the cemetery for $1 from the city. The Hebrew Benevolent Society of Los Angeles was founded in 1854 for the purpose of "procuring a piece of ground suitable for the purpose of a burying ground for the deceased of their own faith, and also to appropriate a portion of their time and means to the holy cause of benevolence". The Hebrew Benevolent Society of Los Angeles received the deed to land from the Los Angeles City Council on April 9, 1855. With this land they established the first Jewish cemetery in Los Angeles at Lilac Terrace and Lookout Drive in Chavez Ravine. The site now includes Dodger Stadium and the Los Angeles Fire Department's Frank Hotchkin Memorialized Training Center.

The land was very rugged which prevented further development of the area at the time. However the area did provide an important watershed and part was used by the Los Angeles Water Company for a canal bringing water from what is now Griffith Park and storing it in a reservoir (today called Buena Vista Reservoir) in Reservoir Ravine. Some of Chavez Canyon and the surrounding hills became Elysian Park in 1886. That same year, two brick manufacturers moved into Chavez Ravine and began blasting operations in the hillsides.

=== 1900s ===
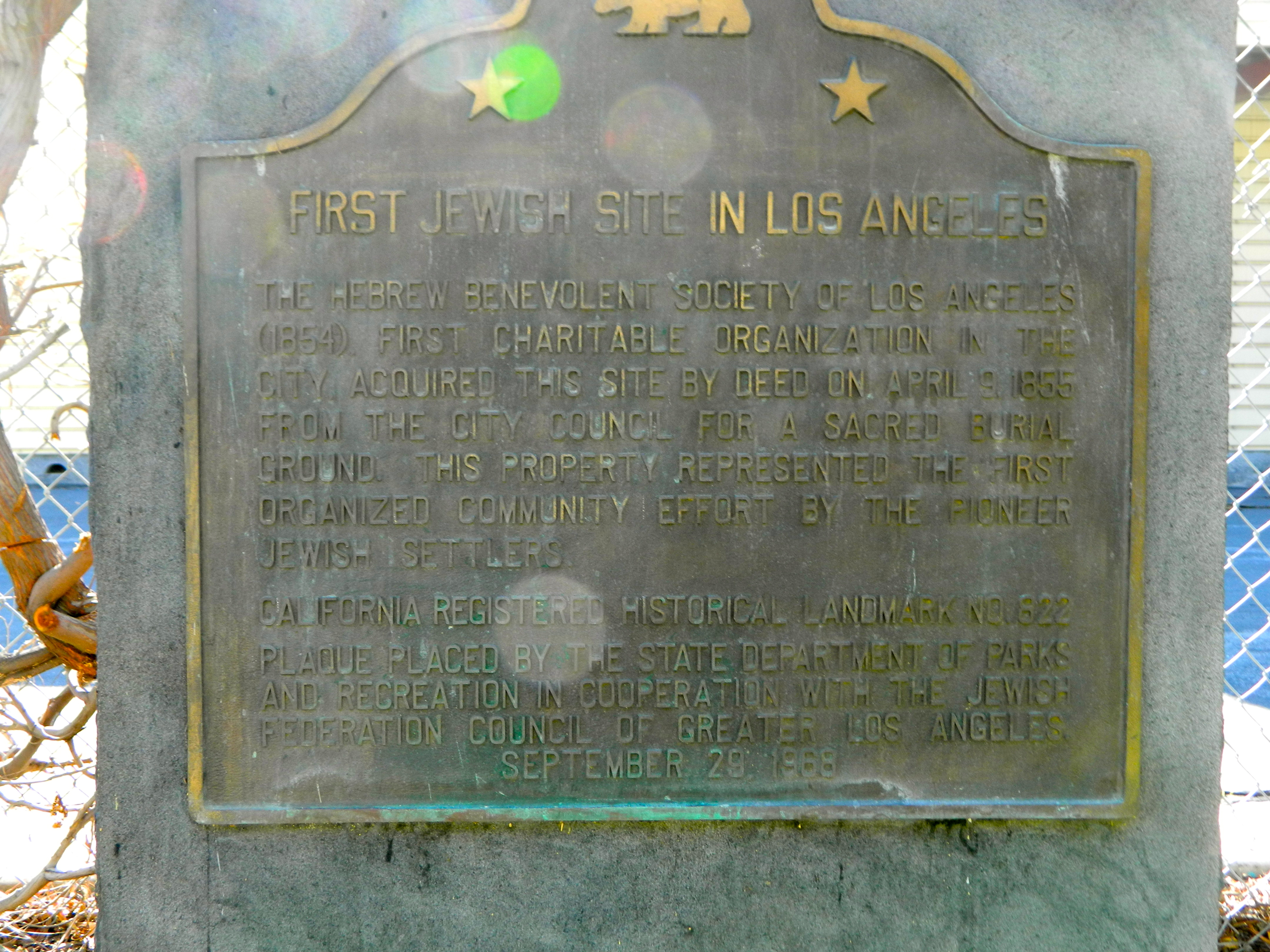
A memorial plaque marking the location of the first Jewish site in Los Angeles, in Chavez Ravine.

In 1902, because of poor environmental conditions due to the unchecked expansion of the oil industry in the Chavez Ravine area, it was proposed by Congregation B'nai B'rith to secure a new plot of land in what is now East LA, and to move the buried remains to the new site, with a continued provision for burial of indigent people, this became the Home of Peace Cemetery in East Los Angeles.

By the early 1900s, in the hills above and around the ravine, a semi-rural Mexican-American community had grown up. Eventually, three distinct neighborhoods formed: Palo Verde, La Loma, and Bishop mostly on the ridges between the neighboring ravines. In 1913 a progressive lawyer named Marshall Stimson subsidized the movement of around 250 Mexican-Americans to these communities from the floodplain of the nearby Los Angeles River. There was a local grocery store, a local church, and Palo Verde Elementary. There was a nearby brick factory which caused local problems from the smoke and dust released. In 1926 the residents of Chavez Ravine organized to shut the company down. On August 20, 1926, the Los Angeles City Council unanimously adopted an ordinance prohibiting the blasting and zoned the area around Chavez Ravine for residential use.

=== 1940s ===
Chavez Ravine was made up of the three mostly Mexican-American communities of La Loma, Palo Verde, and Bishop.

In the 1940s, the area was a poor, though cohesive, Mexican-American community. Many families lived there because of housing discrimination in other parts of Los Angeles. With the population of Los Angeles expanding, Chavez Ravine was viewed as a prime, underutilized location. The city began to label the area as "blighted" and thus ripe for redevelopment. Through a vote, the Housing Authority of the City of Los Angeles, with the assistance of federal funds from the Housing Act of 1949, was designated the task to construct public housing, in large part to address the severe post-World War II housing shortage. Prominent architects Richard Neutra and Robert Alexander developed a plan for "Elysian Park Heights." The city had already relocated many of the residents of Chavez Ravine when the entire project came to a halt.

=== 1950s ===
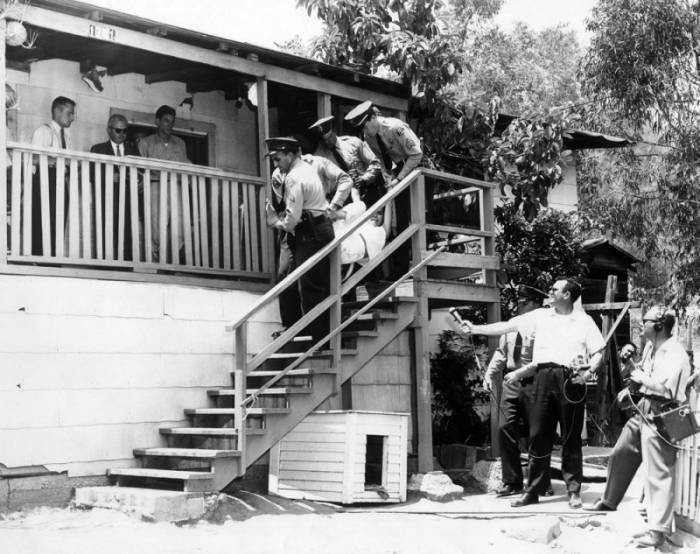
Los Angeles County Sheriffs forcibly evicting Aurora Vargas from her home on Malvina Avenue in Chávez Ravine, as part of the "Battle of Chavez Ravine".

The land for Dodger Stadium was purchased from some local owners/inhabitants in the early 1950s by the City of Los Angeles, using eminent domain, with funds from the Federal Housing Act of 1949. The city had planned to develop the Elysian Park Heights public housing project, which was to include two dozen 13-story buildings and more than 160 two-story townhouses, in addition to newly rebuilt playgrounds and schools.

Los Angeles–based author Mike Davis, in his history of the city, City of Quartz, discussed the process of gradually convincing Chavez Ravine homeowners to sell. Davis asserted that with nearly all of the original Spanish-speaking homeowners initially unwilling to do so, "developers", representing the city and its public housing authority, resorted to offering immediate cash payments, distributed through their Spanish-speaking agents. Once the first sales had been completed, it is said that remaining homeowners were offered lesser amounts of money, allegedly to create a sense of community panic that people would not receive fair compensation, or that they would be left as one of the few holdouts. According to historian John Laslett, the Housing Authority employed high pressure tactics to coerce property owners to sell their home. Some residents continued to resist, despite the pressure being placed upon them by the "developers," resulting in the Battle of Chavez Ravine, an unsuccessful ten-year struggle by a small number of remaining residents of Chavez Ravine to maintain control of their property, after the substantial majority of the area had been transferred to public ownership.

Before construction of the Elysian Park Heights project could begin, the local political climate changed greatly when Norris Poulson was elected mayor of Los Angeles in 1953. Poulson opposed the provision of public housing, claiming that it was "un-American", and support for projects like Elysian Park Heights faded. Following protracted negotiations, the City of Los Angeles was able to repurchase the Chavez Ravine property from the Federal Housing Authority at a drastically reduced price, with the stipulation that the land be used for a public purpose.

Following the "baseball referendum", promoted by the Taxpayers Committee for Yes on Baseball, which was approved by Los Angeles voters on June 3, 1958, the city made the controversial decision to trade 352 acres (142 ha) of land at Chavez Ravine to the Brooklyn Dodgers and team's owner Walter O'Malley in exchange for land around the minor league park, Wrigley Field, with the aim of providing incentives for migration to Los Angeles. From their arrival in Los Angeles in 1958 until 1961, the Dodgers played their home games at the Los Angeles Memorial Coliseum; Dodger Stadium officially opened in 1962.

An overlay of modern and older municipal map information to show the relationship between the community of Palo Verde/Chavez Ravine, larger Echo Park; and current position of Dodger Stadium.

=== Later years ===
During the years when the expansion Los Angeles Angels were tenants of the Dodgers (1962 through 1965), the Angels referred to the stadium as "Chavez Ravine Stadium" or simply "Chavez Ravine". Los Angeles City Council designated the property as "Dodgertown" in October 2008. The United States Postal Service assigned postal code "Dodgertown, CA 90090" in April 2009.

A number of structures from Chavez Ravine were spared demolition and sold by the developers of Dodger Stadium to nearby Universal Studios for one dollar apiece. Universal moved the structures to its back lot where they subsequently appeared in various Universal productions, most notably the 1962 film To Kill a Mockingbird. The house of Atticus Finch, for example, was an erstwhile Chavez Ravine home.

However, according to the film's art director, Henry Bumstead, as cited in an article in Andrew Horton's "Henry Bumstead and the World of Hollywood Art Direction", the houses used on the Mockingbird set were actually purchased by the studio after they had been condemned and slated for demolition to make way for new freeway construction.

=== Today ===
Most of Chavez Ravine remains in Elysian Park, where the Chavez Ravine Arboretum still stands. The arboretum was founded in 1893 by the Los Angeles Horticultural Society where trees were added to through to the 1920s. Most of the Arboretum's original trees are still standing and many are the oldest and largest of their kind in California and even the United States. Further south in the ravine is Barlow Respiratory Hospital which was founded in 1902 and continues to treat patients today. At the open end of the ravine immediately adjacent to Dodger Stadium is the Naval and Marine Corps Reserve Center which was built in 1937 but is today a training facility, Frank Hotchkin Memorial Training Center, for the Los Angeles City Fire Department.

== References in the arts ==
Chavez Ravine is mentioned in Joe Strummer & the Mescaleros' song "All in a Day" in their 2003 album Streetcore.

Chavez Ravine, 1949: A Los Angeles Story (1999) collects interviews and photos by Don Normark documenting the Ravine's culture at the time.

Chávez Ravine is a concept album recorded by Ry Cooder which tells the story of Chávez Ravine. It was nominated for "Grammy Award for Best Contemporary Folk Album" in 2006. It was used as a soundtrack to a 2005 PBS documentary directed by Jordan Mechner. The film makes use of the Normark photos in telling the story of how a Mexican American community was destroyed, thinking their community was going to be replaced with a low-income public housing project, however it was replaced with Dodger Stadium.

The Provisional City (2000) recounts the postwar history of housing in Los Angeles by Dana Cuff, and devotes a section of the book to the politics of transforming Chavez Ravine into a modern housing development designed by Richard Neutra and Robert Alexander, and the demise of that utopian plan.

A portion of the Great Wall of Los Angeles, a mural by Judith F. Baca in the Tujunga Wash Drainage Canal in San Fernando Valley, California, is titled "The Division of the Barrios and Chavez Ravine." It depicts families separated by freeways and the Dodger Stadium in the air like a spaceship.

In 2003, the Urban Performance Troupe Culture Clash, comprising three writers and performers Richard Montoya, Ric Salinas and Herbert Siguenza, premiered a stage show titled Chávez Ravine at the Mark Taper Forum.

The 1952 crime drama film Without Warning! has several scenes that take place in Chavez Ravine.

During Dave Dameshek's "Number One Sports" segment on The Adam Carolla Show, Dodger Stadium was often humorously referred to as Chavez Ravine.

At the end of the Twilight Zone episode "The Whole Truth" (1961) Rod Serling says "be particularly careful in explaining to the boss about your grandmother's funeral when you are actually at Chavez Ravine watching the Dodgers."

"Chavez Ravine" is mentioned in episode "Community" of the TV police drama Southland when a fraud victim describes how he was "born on home plate" and lived in his family home in Chavez Ravine until May 9, 1959, when the city came in and bulldozed his home to make way for Dodger Stadium.

In the Amazon TV series Bosch, Police Commissioner Bradley Walker, played by John Getz, states that "My father bulldozed Bunker Hill so that lawyers could have an ocean view, *his* father destroyed Chavez Ravine for low cost housing he knew would never happen."

Dick Valentine, lead singer of Electric Six, has the song named "The Ghost of Chavez Ravine."

Wayne and Shuster mention Chavez Ravine in their sketch "A Shakespearean Baseball Game": "I thought I saw the ghost of Dizzy Dean/Calling a game in the Chavez Ravine."

The 2009 novel by Thomas Pynchon, Inherent Vice, and its 2014 film adaptation both make mention of a "Long, sad history of L.A. land use... Mexican families bounced out of Chavez Ravine to build Dodger Stadium".

== See also ==
- Don A. Allen, Los Angeles City Council member, favored building a zoo and a golf course, as well as a baseball stadium, in the Ravine
- City Council member Harold A. Henry, opposed the contract with the Dodgers
- John C. Holland, Los Angeles City Council member, 1943–1967, also opposed the pact
- Patrick D. McGee (1916–1970), Los Angeles City Council member who opposed the contract
- City Council member L.E. Timberlake, favored the contract
- City Councilwoman Rosalind Wiener Wyman, leader of fight to bring the Dodgers to Los Angeles
