= Nordhoff =

Nordhoff may refer to:

- Ojai, California, a city that was formerly named Nordhoff
- Nordhoff High School, a public high school in Ojai, California
- Nordhoff station, a metro station in Chatsworth, Los Angeles
- Nordhoff Street, a major thoroughfare in Los Angeles
- Heinrich Nordhoff (1899–1968), German automotive engineer, managing director of Volkswagen
- Charles Nordhoff (1887–1947), English-born author
- Charles Nordhoff (journalist) (1830–1901), German-born, American journalist
