= Nordhoff, California =

Nordhoff, California may refer to:

- Archaic name for Ojai, California
  - Nordhoff High School, a public high school in Ojai, California
- Nordhoff station, Chatsworth, Los Angeles
- Nordhoff station (Metro Rail)
- Nordhoff Street in the San Fernando Valley
