= Sherwood Forest, Los Angeles =

Sherwood Forest
- Neighborhood of Los Angeles
- Location within Los Angeles/San Fernando Valley Sherwood Forest (the Los Angeles metropolitan area)
- Coordinates: 34°13′56″N 118°31′12″W
- Country: United States
- State: California
- County: Los Angeles
- City: Los Angeles
- City Council District: District 12
- Neighborhood Council: Northridge South

Population (2012)
  - Total: 5,000
- Time zone: UTC-8 (PST)
  - Summer (DST): UTC-7 (PDT)
- ZIP code: 91325
- Area codes: 818 and 747

Sherwood Forest is a residential neighborhood in the San Fernando Valley region of the City of Los Angeles, California.

== Geography ==
Sherwood Forest is located in the central area of the San Fernando Valley region in the City of Los Angeles; it is within the Northridge South Neighborhood Council District. The neighborhood is bounded by Nordhoff Street in the north, Balboa Boulevard in the east, the Southern Pacific Railroad in the south, and Lindley Avenue in the west. It is an enclave in the neighborhood of Northridge and is near the neighborhoods of Lake Balboa to the south, Van Nuys to the southeast and North Hills to the east.

The overlapping 818 and 747 area codes serve the area and it lies in the 91325 ZIP code.

== History ==
The area of Sherwood Forest had a subdivision of large estates with small ranches and one to a couple of acres of land with tall trees; the main thoroughfare, Parthenia Street, was lined with cedar trees and the subdivision was named Sherwood Forest by realtors.It had the residences of multiple local celebrities like character actor Walter Brennan, Lloyd Bridges, Jim Davis, Richard Pryor who lived on Parthenia Street in the 1980s, and Hollywood animator Abe Levitow, plus Founder and President of Rocketdyne, William Guy.

The neighborhood existed informally for decades within the neighborhood of Northridge and eventually had its own Homeowners Association, becoming one of the most active in the region. In 2012, the community won the Los Angeles City Council's official recognition as a separate neighborhood with an 11–0 vote.

== Government ==
=== Local government ===
Sherwood Forest is governed locally by the City of Los Angeles and is represented in the Los Angeles City Council by the member elected for district 12. The current member representing the district is John Lee.

==== Neighborhood Council ====
Sherwood Forest lies in the district of the Northridge South Neighborhood Council. The Neighborhood Council was certified by the City of Los Angeles Board of Neighborhood Commissioners on May 4, 2010.

=== Federal and State legislature representation ===
The neighborhood is represented federally by the congress member elected for California's 32nd congressional district and both senators from California. On the state level, it is represented by the state assembly member elected for California's 40th State Assembly district and the state senator elected for California's 27th State Senate district.

Federal representatives
United States Congress
- Brad Sherman (California's 32nd congressional district)
United States Senate
- Adam Schiff
- Alex Padilla

State representatives
California State Assembly
- Pilar Schiavo (California's 40th State Assembly district)
California State Senate
- Henry Stern (California's 27th State Senate district)

== Demographics ==
In 2012 the neighborhood had a population of about 4,848 on around 1,200 properties.

== Education ==
There are no schools within the neighborhood boundaries; however, it is served by nearby schools in surrounding neighborhoods. The neighborhood is adjacent to California State University, Northridge. The nearest public library is the Northridge Branch of the Los Angeles Public Library.

=== Public schools ===
The community is served by the Los Angeles Unified School District.

Elementary school students in the neighborhood are in the attendance boundaries of Calahan Street, Dearborn, and Parthenia Street Elementary Schools; the majority of the neighborhood is covered by Dearborn Elementary School. Middle school students may attend Oliver Wendell Holmes International Middle School and Northridge Middle School. High school students may attend Grover Cleveland Charter and James Monroe High Schools.

==== Local School District Administration ====
The neighborhood is in the Northwest Local District in the North Region of LAUSD, both headed by Superintendent David Baca. The neighborhood is in the 3rd District of the LAUSD Board of Education, represented by board member and Board Vice President Scott Schmerelson.

== Infrastructure ==
The major west-east thoroughfares in the neighborhood are Nordhoff Street, which forms the neighborhood's northern boundary, and Parthenia Street which passes through the center of the neighborhood. The major north–south thoroughfares are Lindley Avenue and Balboa Boulevard, which bound the neighborhood on the west and east respectively and the latter being the most important of the two. White Oak and Louise Avenues are two smaller but notable north–south streets that provide more local connections in the neighborhood. These major and secondary roads are arranged in a grid pattern, as is the case in most of the San Fernando Valley's roads; residential streets are also generally arranged in a grid, but some are more curved and are cul-de-sacs. There is no designated bicycle infrastructure in the neighborhood.

The Los Angeles County Metropolitan Transportation Authority operates Metro Bus local lines 166, 167, 236, and 237 on the bounding thoroughfares. The Los Angeles Department of Transportation operates Commuter Express routes 573 and 574 along Balboa Boulevard.

== See also ==
- Northridge
