= Pacoima (disambiguation) =

Pacoima may refer to:

- Pacoima, Los Angeles
- Pacoima Wash
- Pacoima Dam
- "Pacoima" (Wonder Man), an episode of Wonder Man
