= North Hills, Los Angeles =

North Hills Sepulveda
- Neighborhood of Los Angeles
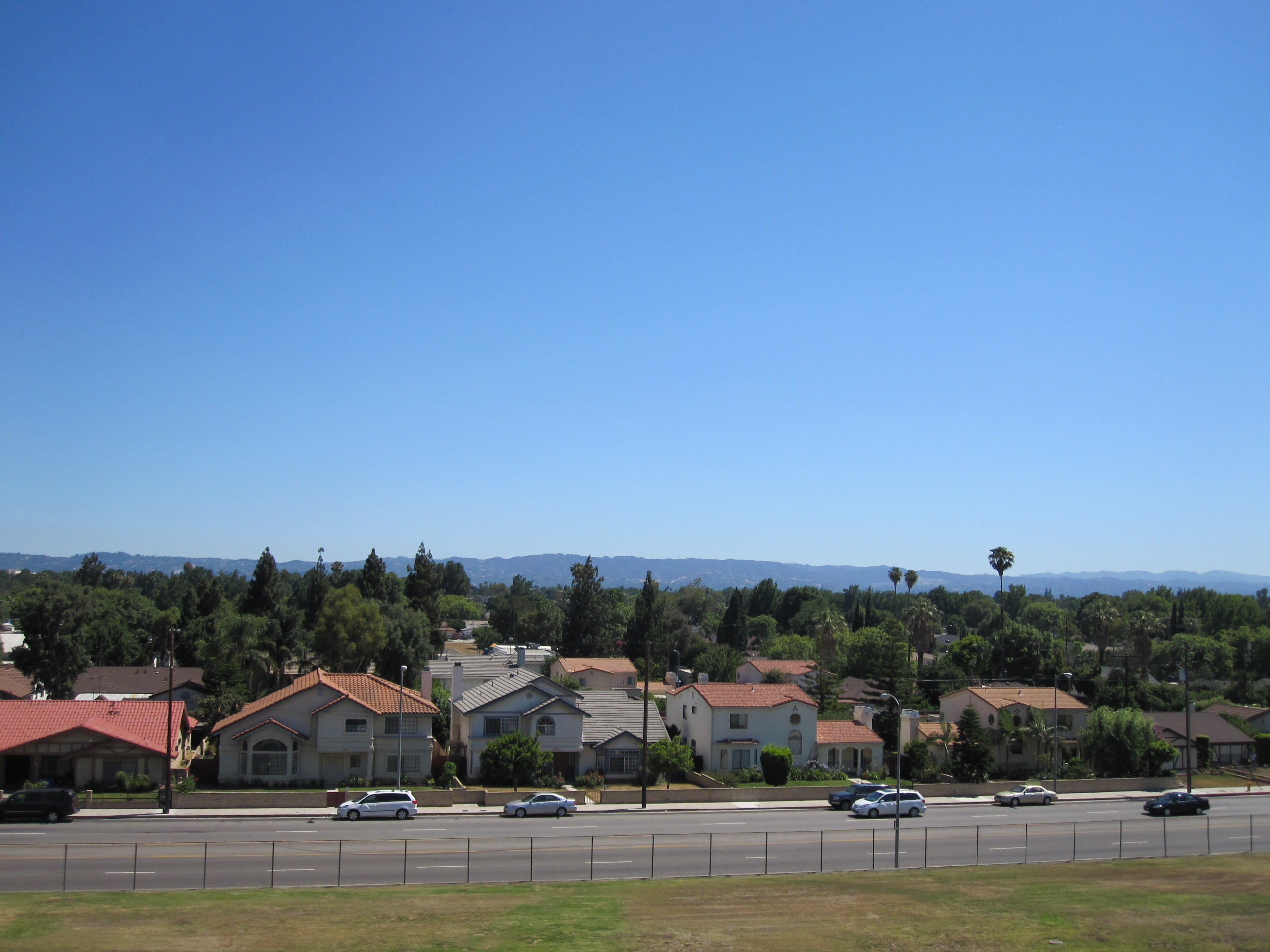
- North Hills and the valley from the VA Hospital.

- Location within Los Angeles/San Fernando Valley North Hills (the Los Angeles metropolitan area)
- Coordinates: 34°14′08″N 118°29′06″W
- Country: United States
- State: California
- County: Los Angeles
- City: Los Angeles
- City Council Districts: • District 6 • District 7 • District 12
- Neighborhood Councils: • North Hills East • North Hills West
- Named for: Location in the north of Los Angeles
- Elevation: 840 ft (256 m)

Population (2000)
  - Total: 56,946
- Time zone: UTC-8 (PST)
  - Summer (DST): UTC-7 (PDT)
- ZIP code: 91343
- Area codes: 818 and 747

North Hills, known previously as Sepulveda, is a neighborhood in the San Fernando Valley region of Los Angeles, California.

North Hills was originally part of an agricultural community known as Mission Acres. After World War II, the newly developed suburban community was renamed Sepulveda, after the prominent Sepúlveda family of California. In 1991, it was renamed North Hills.

== Geography ==
=== Location ===
The neighborhood of North Hills is located in the central San Fernando Valley, a region of the city of Los Angeles. It is intersected by the 405 Freeway and lies between Bull Creek and the Pacoima Wash. By road, it is 21 miles northwest of downtown; In relation to the cities surrounding Los Angeles, the neighborhood is about 17 miles north of Santa Monica, 16 miles east of Simi Valley, 14 miles northeast of Calabasas, 13 miles northwest of Burbank, 12 miles south of Santa Clarita, and 4 miles southwest of San Fernando. Surrounding neighborhoods are Northridge to the west, Panorama City to the east, Van Nuys to the south, and Granada Hills and Mission Hills to the north.

Overlapping Area codes 747 and 818 serve the area. The North Hills ZIP code is 91343.

=== Boundaries ===
==== Neighborhood council district boundaries ====
While neighborhood boundaries in the Los Angeles area are generally informal, the official boundaries used by the North Hills East and West neighborhood council districts would make the neighborhood a 4.31 square miles (11.2 km^{2}) area between Bull Creek and the Pacoima Wash on the west and east respectively. The southern boundary is Roscoe Boulevard between Bull Creek and the Pacoima Wash; North Hills East neighborhood council district includes a panhandle of land extending south of Roscoe Boulevard to the Coast Line railroad between the 405 Freeway and Sepulveda Boulevard. The northern boundary is Lassen Street from the Pacoima Wash to Woodley Avenue; Since 2012, the northwest of North Hills is bounds the community of Woodley Hill in Northridge, which occupies the square area which bounds North Hills on Woodley Avenue in the west and Plummer Street in the south. The neighborhood council districts are separated by the 405 Freeway. The West district has an area of 2.38 square miles (6.2 km^{2}) and the East has an area of 1.93 square miles (5.0 km^{2}).

==== ZIP code area ====
When ZIP codes were introduced in 1963, the 91343 code designated for Sepulveda, now North Hills, was applied to an area which extended further than what was considered part of Sepulveda. This broad boundary has informed politics regarding neighborhood nomenclature. Some sources, notably the Los Angeles Times' Mapping L.A. project, extend the neighborhood's boundaries to Balboa Boulevard and Bull Creek ("the wash") on the west, and Lassen and Devonshire Street on the north, mostly conforming to the 91343 ZIP code area.

The area which had been considered part of Granada Hills, bounded by Devonshire and Lassen streets on the north and south, and Balboa Boulevard and the San Diego Freeway on the west and east, was made part of North Hills following a petition by its residents in August, 1991; however, the North Hills Fashion center was not included in the petition, as shop owners opted to remain in Granada Hills and its chamber of commerce, and this whole area north of Lassen Street is now included in the Granada Hills South Neighborhood Council District.

The portion of the 91343 ZIP code area west of Bull Creek to Balboa Boulevard, between the North Hills Shopping Center to the north and Roscoe Boulevard in the south, has historically been considered part of Northridge and is included in the Northridge South and East neighborhood council districts. Despite efforts by residents to have a ZIP code coinciding with their neighborhood, they fall under the area that was designated for North Hills.

== Toponymy ==
The current name, "North Hills," originated in 1991, when residents of the western half of the neighborhood, formerly named Sepulveda, voted to secede from the eastern section, divided by the 405 freeway, and form a new community with that name; the city subsequently applied the name to the entirety of Sepulveda. Eventually, the city divided the neighborhood council district into "North Hills West" and "North Hills East" along the same lines proposed in 1991. Sepulveda continues to be a recognized name for addresses in the ZIP code covering North Hills.

Historically, the community has gone by two previous names. When it began as an agricultural-residential community in 1914, the land tracts corresponding to the modern community of North Hills in San Fernando Mission Land, then owned by the homonymous land company, were advertised as "Mission Acres." The name stuck until 1927 when residents renamed the community "Sepulveda." It had been proposed that the community be named "Brand", but residents rallied around the name Sepulveda because of the newly named Sepulveda Boulevard crossing the town, and the formal name change was celebrated on May 6.

In 1930 valley newspaper article noted that valley communities' names were pronounced inconsistently and outline what valley a businessman, Charles E. Racha, considered to be correct pronunciations for several of them; for Sepulveda, he wrote that the pronunciation "should be 'say-pull-vay-da' with the accent on the second syllable," and that "the pronunciation in common use would be correct if the second syllable were pronounced like our English word 'pull'." A 2021 explanation of the pronunciation of the name "Sepulveda" noted that while previous explanations "emphasized the penultimate 'E,' [...] the correct pronunciation is 'seh-POOL-vay-dah, [...] Anglicized as 'seh-PULL-vuh-duh.'"

== History ==
The San Fernando Valley is in the traditional homeland of Tongva people, as well as Tataviam and Chumash people. In the valley, most native settlements, later called rancherías by the Spanish, were located in the south, where the land had better irrigation in the dry season and provided shelter from winter floods. The north valley was the location of the settlements of Paséknga in the area of San Fernando city, Pakoinga, of Tataviam etymology, located in modern Pacoima, and Ceegenga, a Tongva village in the area of Granada Hills. The area of North Hills would have been a flatland in the center of the valley, subject to winter floods from the Pacoima Wash and located between the northern and southern valley rancherías.

=== Colonization and mission era ===
Europeans first arrived at the valley during the Spanish Portolá expedition on August 5, 1769, and named it Valle de Santa Catalina de Bononia de los Encinos. They set up camp in the southern valley and had friendly encounters with the native people. The expedition left their camp on August 7 and followed native routes to cross the valley, likely passing through the area where North Hills is now located, and set up camp at the northern valley foothills before proceeding in their expedition. The colonization of the upper Californias began with the Portolá expedition and advanced in the following years. The San Gabriel Mission was founded in 1771, and the Pueblo de Los Ángeles was settled in 1781.

With the pueblo's founding and by royal edict, all the waters of the Porciúncula River were reserved for use by the new pueblo, including valley lands, and royal concessions for grazing land were issued. Francisco Reyes, alcalde of Los Ángeles from 1793 to 1795, established a grazing operation of Rancho Los Encinos near Paséknga which included the agricultural settlement of Achooykomenga, worked by Chumash, Tongva, and Tataviam laborers. The rancho was acquired by Franciscan missionaries after being identified as a suitable site for a mission, and on September 8, 1797, the San Fernando Rey de España Mission was founded, placing most of the valley's land, including the area of North Hills, and its indigenous inhabitants under the mission's jurisdiction.

After the independence of Mexico from Spain, an 1833 government decree led to the secularization of the missions in Alta and Baja California and the San Fernando Mission was officially secularized in 1834. The mission became the head of a parish and the government commissioned a mayordomo to oversee the process of secularization and to administer the former mission land.

=== Rancho land ===
In 1845, governor Pío Pico signed a 9-year land lease, at $1,120 per year, to his brother Andrés Pico and his business partner Juan Manso who used it for cattle ranching. In the wake of the American intervention in Mexico, the governor put the land up for sale as the Rancho Ex-Misión de San Fernando to raise funds. The ranch lands were sold to Spanish merchant Eulogio de Celis for $14,000 on June 17, 1846. A portion of land lying just north of modern North Hills surrounding the mission complex was reserved for Andrés Pico and became known as the Pico Reserve.

The Mexican armed resistance to the American intervention ceased in the beginning of 1848 and the Treaty of Guadalupe Hidalgo ceded the California Territory to the United States. The Treaty provided that the Mexican land grants would be honored and American officials acquired Spanish and Mexican records to confirm titles.

Eulogio de Celis filed his claim to the rancho lands in October 1852, but the land grant was not formally upheld by the U.S. District Court until January 1873, after he had returned to Spain and four years after his death. In the meantime, Andrés Pico paid de Celis' lawyer, Edward Vischer, $15,000 for an undivided half-interest in the rancho in 1854, the same year Pico's lease expired. The land was divided along a line which roughly follows Roscoe Boulevard, now considered North Hills' southern boundary, and the southern half was sold to Pico. Andrés eventually sold his half-interest in the rancho to his brother Pío in 1862, retaining the 2,000-acre Pico Reserve; in turn, Pío sold the interest to the San Fernando Farm Homestead Association for $115,000 in 1869; this association went through several name changes, eventually becoming the Los Angeles Farming and Milling Company.

In a 1871 plat of the rancho, the North Hills area is shown to be an undeveloped land crossed by a road which led to the Pico Reserve and the mission in the north from the Rancho Los Encinos in the south. A sheep camp is shown to have been located just north of the ranch partition line on the west bank of the Pacoima Wash, which corresponds to the southeast end of modern North Hills. De Celis died in Spain in 1869 and his son Eulogio F. de Celis returned as the administrator of his father's estate which was later finally patented to his father by the government on January 8, 1873. After negotiations between the heirs of de Celis and the San Fernando Farm Homestead Association, the valley was formally divided into north and south. The heirs then sold the remaining northern half of the rancho, which includes present-day North Hills, to Charles Maclay and George K. Porter in 1875 for $125,000. With this, the Rancho era essentially ended in the San Fernando Valley; land divisions continued, what remained of the original mission agriculture fell into disuse, and the remaining indigenous population nearly disappeared from the region.

=== Porter land ===
The former rancho land was placed under Porter's name and he owned a three-fourths interest in the property, with Maclay owning the remaining quarter. Porter saw the valley as a site with potential for agricultural development, whereas Maclay was more focused on its colonization. In order to pay off the de Celis mortgage, they counted on the success of the town of San Fernando, which had then been newly platted along the Southern Pacific Railroad. A local bank failure and the departure of railroad workers led to a collapse in the real estate boom which made Maclay turn to renting land for sheep pasture and farming; then, a drought in 1876 and 1877 led to the failure of grain fields and the death of tens of thousands of sheep.

Maclay was unable to meet the mortgage and de Celis filed for foreclosure in July 1876; the Los Angeles district court found Maclay personally liable for the mortgage payment in June 1877 and ordered the sale of his quarter interest, and that if the sale was insufficient to meet the mortgage, then Porter's interest would also be sold. While they managed to delay the foreclosure for two years, the interest accumulated. In July 1879, the Maclay portion was sold to Benjamin F. Porter and, because the sale amount was insufficient, George Porter's remaining share was sold to Josefa A. de Celis. George managed to reobtain his interest in April 1880 thanks to his agent, Francis M. Wright, a valley farmer. In February 1881, Maclay and the Porters reached an agreement to partition the land. Maclay kept a third of the land lying north of the railroad and east of the Pacoima Wash called the Maclay Rancho, the Porters kept the remaining two-thirds to the west. In 1881, the Porter cousins split their holdings and George received the portion between the Pacoima Wash in the east and Aliso Canyon, about current-day Zelzah Avenue, in the west. George Porter's land included all of current North Hills.

In 1887, George K. Porter subdivided the land and established the Porter Land and Water Company to take advantage of a land sales boom. Nearly 17,000 acres were subdivided into ten and forty acre lots with an irrigation system sufficient for 4,000 acres. John B. Baskin, a partner and sales agent of the company began an extensive marketing and promotional campaign for the land subdivision; a frequent motif of the marketing is the remains of the mission which was surrounded by the tract. Baskin also hired California State Engineer William Hammond Hall to develop an irrigation plan for water derived from the local springs and arroyos like the Pacoima Wash. The boom began to fade by the end of 1888 and went bust the next year with internal company problems and declining national and local economies which preceded the Panic of 1893; the decline would also be exacerbated by severe droughts in the 1890s. In October 1903, Porter sold his firm and transferred remaining lands to a syndicate led by Leslie C. Brand which was incorporated as the San Fernando Mission Land Company.

=== Community development ===
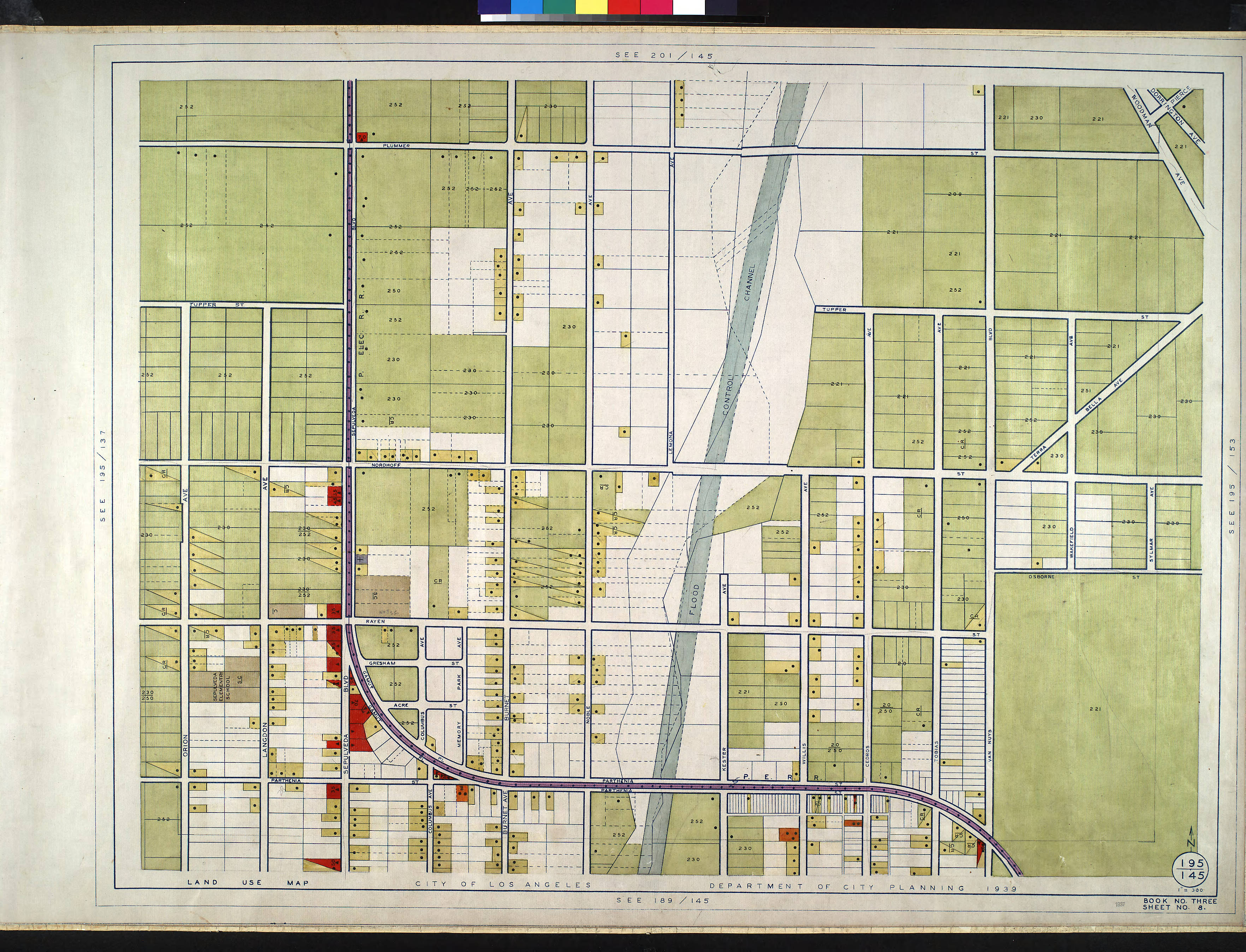
1930's WPA Land use map depicting a portion of Sepulveda.

The 20th century began with important developments for the San Fernando Valley which led to its rapid settlement. In 1905, the City of Los Angeles announced its plans to bring water to the city from the Owens Valley and began construction on the Los Angeles Aqueduct in 1908; the future arrival of water to the valley spurred development. The southern half of the former rancho lands were bought from the Los Angeles Farming and Milling Co. by a syndicate incorporated as the Los Angeles Suburban Homes Company, and the towns of Van Nuys, Marion, and Owensmouth were planned out along with a system of highways. The Pacific Electric Railway also began an expansion into the valley which reached the burgeoning community of Van Nuys in December 1911, and was completed with its arrival in the city of San Fernando in March 1913, allowing better connections to Los Angeles from the valley. The San Fernando Mission Land Co. began to market its then over 16,000 acres of land to the public in April 1912, advertising five, ten, and fifteen acre tracts adapted to citriculture and other agricultural uses.

In October 1912, The Angeles Mesa Land Company purchased Henry E. Huntington's one-tenth share in the Mission Land property holdings. The companies began to invest in the extension of the railway to San Fernando and the construction of a 4-mile boulevard, named Brand Boulevard, to connect San Fernando to Van Nuys on Sherman Way, hoping to open it for use when the Los Angeles Aqueduct is inaugurated. Work on Brand Boulevard advanced and workers began to spread asphalt on the first mile by mid-1913; one side of the road was designed for exclusive use by automobiles, while the other was multi-use for trucks, heavy wagons, and horse-drawn vehicles. The aqueduct water reached the valley in November, 1913.

Mission Acres was an agricultural community made by early developers who created 1 acre plots for agricultural activities, with irrigation supplied by the Los Angeles Aqueduct in 1913. The community was a stop for the Pacific Electric railway streetcars that transported passengers from downtown Los Angeles to the San Fernando Valley.

Residents of Mission Acres renamed the area Sepulveda in 1927. The Californio Sepulveda family, going back to the founding of the Pueblo of Los Angeles, is the source of various Los Angeles place-names, including the post-war community of Sepulveda. Sepulveda Boulevard is the primary north–south street through North Hills, crossing Sepulveda Pass to the south. The community saw significant growth between the 1930s and the 1950s.

In 1930, it was reported that residents in Sepulveda were unclear as to whether they lived in Sepulveda or Van Nuys. The communities in the valley, which were regarded of towns in their own right within the city, were growing rapidly and were developing their own senses of individuality; but there was confusion regarding the boundaries of these communities. In March of that year, the district engineering department of the valley drew up a map showing boundary lines of the various communities in the valley, the first map of its kind. The boundary lines for Sepulveda were drawn along Saticoy, Balboa, Lassen, and Payton (Now Woodman Avenue). According to figures taken from the 1930 census by Guy E. Marion of the Los Angeles Chamber of Commerce, the neighborhood had a population of 1563 people.

The water department employed 130 men in the construction of a 54-inch water main along Hayvenhurst Avenue between Plummer Street and Roscoe Boulevard in the beginning of 1931. This line, which was to end on Roscoe Boulevard and Corbin Avenue, was being built to accommodate the increased water storage in the lower San Fernando reservoir.

In 1937, councilman Jim Wilson offered a resolution that instructed the city's real estate agent to make the right of way cost appraisal for diverting flood waters from Wilson and East Canyons into Pacoima Wash to protect the community of Sepulveda from floods that occurred during heavy storms. This same year, the Our Lady of Peace Catholic Church was built and the parish was established years later in 1944.

=== Post World War II ===
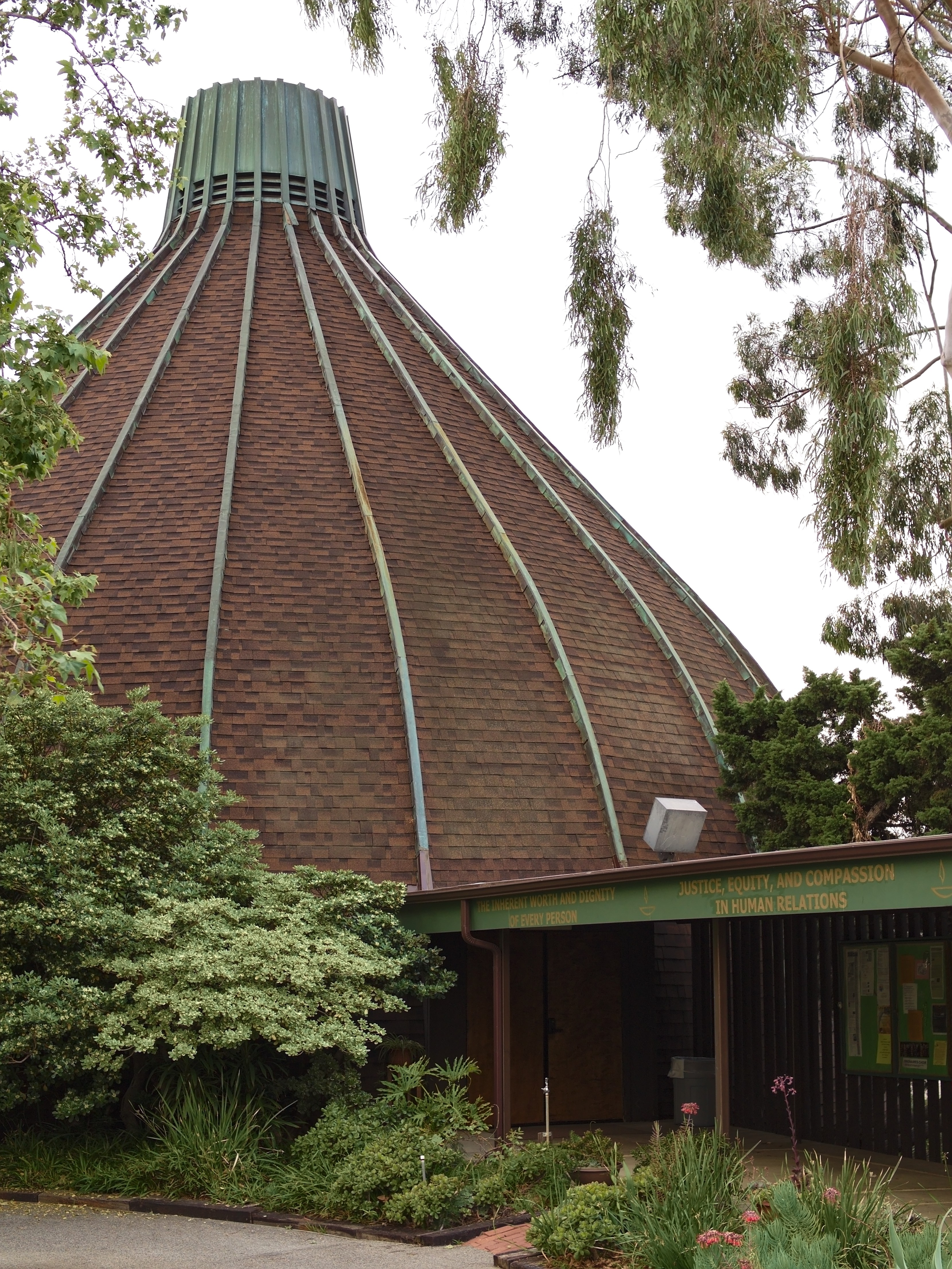
Sepulveda Unitarian Universalist Society Sanctuary, also known as The Onion, built in 1964

The area remained mostly rural through the 1940s, urbanization initiated during the 1950s during which the entire San Fernando Valley was experiencing a transition from semi-rural and agricultural uses into suburban development patterns. Multi-family residential units began to be developed in the 1960s.

Before the construction of the 405, Sepulveda Boulevard was a major highway and the neighborhood became a stopping point for travelers to and from Los Angeles. Motels began to be established along Sepulveda. Among these motels is the Good Knight Inn, which began construction in 1945 and featured a façade designed to resemble a castle; by 2023, the motel has continued to run and has retained much of its original form.

The Our Lady of Peace Catholic school was being built by 1951 and began to hold classes that year, the school building was officially completed in 1954, followed by various additions. Later that year of 1954, the new Our Lady of Peace church designed by Armet and Davis was completed; the former church structure was repurposed by the parish as Schneider's Hall. By 1956, the school was the largest elementary school in the Archdiocese of Los Angeles and remained so for two more years.

Noble Elementary School's construction completed in 1949, opening in November of that year. The opening of the Noble school eliminated the half-day sessions which Sepulveda students had been attending for three years. The Sepulveda school (Now Langdon Elementary) added six classrooms for first and second grade students as well as an auditorium. Plummer Elementary School, designed in the International style by E. R. C. Billerbeck for LAUSD, was completed in 1952.

The Sepulveda Veterans Administration Hospital was completed in a 160-acre property in 1955.

After four years of construction, Francisco Sepulveda Junior High School, designed by architect Arthur Froelich in the International style, was completed in 1960.

With school enrollments expected to surge as the valley's population continued to grow, the 1960 county ballot propositions D and E, which approved bonds of $128,300,000 for elementary schools and $24,700,000 for junior colleges respectively, were passed in the November 8 elections. About a third of the proposed projects, totaling 233 and including 10 new elementary schools, and more than $50,000,000 were assigned to the valley. The propositions found support of valley residents and teachers, with proposition D receiving 139,642 favorable votes against 50,257. Among the projects built from using proposition D funds was Lassen Elementary School in the then recently developed northeast of Sepulveda. The new elementary school's seven original buildings were constructed at a cost of $504,950, with its auditorium and lunch shelter constructed under separate contracts costing $113,448 and $13,000, respectively. A year later, Lassen, along with one other valley elementary school, opened on January 29, 1962. It started its first spring semester with 700 enrolled students, and 19 faculty members with Mrs. Bonnavier Wildes as the first principal.

In 1976, the first Korean-owned autobody shop in the San Fernando Valley was founded in Sepulveda by Ki Hwan Kim, reflecting the migration of members of the Korean community in Los Angeles into the valley, mostly from Korea Town.

Sepulveda Village, a 21,000-square-foot shopping center valued at $2.5-million and developed by Encino-based Windsor Financial Corporation was completed in March, 1980, providing retail locations along Sepulveda Boulevard and Plummer, across from Sepulveda Middle School. Initial tenants included 7-Eleven, Winchell's Donuts, and Baskin-Robbins.

By the end of the 1980s, Sepulveda had become associated with crime, including gang activity and prostitution. Columbus Street became notorious for drug trafficking and had begun to be called "'C' Street", with the "C" referring to cocaine. In 1989, the city set up barricades in an effort to stave off the drug trade, restricting access to the street. This was one of the early experiments by the city in the use of barricades for crime management. Residents feared that this would simply move the activity to another street, but it was reported that the amount of drug traffic did dissipate by the next year; however, questions as to their effectivity would be raised in the following years. In 1990, a graffiti buster organization associated with the Greater Van Nuys Area Chamber of Commerce was formed, sponsoring several beautification days.

Despite its negative reputation, homebuyers were moving to Sepulveda for its central location in the valley which provided ease of access to the freeway and allowed easy commute to the rest of Los Angeles; in addition, the area was providing relatively low prices for new housing. Developers were continuing to replace older houses with new residential developments, especially single-family detached homes in gated communities. Among these residential developers were Urban RealCorp., which was one of the most active in the area, MWH Development, West Wilshire Development, and Concept Developers. The neighborhood's reputation, however, was preventing Sepulveda from being considered a "hot spot."

=== Name change ===
In 1990, residents of Sepulveda living west of the San Diego Freeway began organizing to secede from the eastern half of the neighborhood. West Sepulveda residents wanted to disassociate from the connotations of the name with the east side of the neighborhood, which had begun to be associated with "crime and prostitution."

Campaigners argued that the freeway formed "a natural dividing line between two very distinct communities," a later proponent asserted that since the construction of the freeway, "Sepulveda [had] never been the same whole community." The west neighborhood was categorized as a community of almost exclusively single-family dwellings while describing streets in the east as "lined with apartment buildings, condominiums and high-density business developments." Real-estate broker Michael Ribons who became a secession campaign spokesman argued that the community simply wanted to have its own identity and sense of community pride, and that the name change would stimulate involvement from the west part of the neighborhood in the east. East Sepulveda residents questioned the arguments of the campaign, arguing that much of the east portion also consisted of single-family dwellings, some being larger and more expensive than the average home in the west portion, with apartment buildings only being the norm along Sepulveda Boulevard; furthermore, some questioned the motivations of the campaign and one resident classified it as "a plot by real estate brokers and developers to lower property values in east Sepulveda," which Ribons denied. Opponents also argued that the community would be better served if the community stuck together to improve problem areas, and questioned that the west would contribute to the aiding problems in the east. In an article written the year after, LA Times editor Steve Padilla questioned the name itself, noting that besides the hill on Woodley Avenue and the grade on which the Veteran's Hospital lies, the neighborhood is "so flat that it takes a keen eye to appreciate its rolling hills, as they mostly roll only a few yards at a time." A resident of the Woodley Avenue hill quoted by Padilla also noted that the neighborhood is located in the middle of the valley rather than the north, calling the name "incongruous." In addition, several business bearing "North Hills" were located in other surrounding neighborhoods. Questions surrounding the name would later be echoed by opponents; however, one proponent argued that the name "is actually an obvious combination of Northridge and Granada Hills," and that it was chosen decades before by developers who expected that the area southeast of the North Hills Shopping Center in Granada Hills would have the same name.

The campaign began with door-to-door canvassing and continued with a mailing campaign largely coordinated by Ribons. An estimated 3500 signatures were needed for the petition to be brought to a vote by the city council, and by mid-September, more than 1300 west Sepulveda residents signed the petition. A month later, more than half of the approximately 4000 residents had signed the petition and gained support of their councilman, Hal Bernson. East Sepulveda residents, while not having formed an organized opposition, expressed it to their councilman, Joel Wachs. Wach's office said it would support the majority of homeowners in the area he represents in the east. Arline DeSanctis qualified some of the arguments made by the petition against the east neighborhood as greatly exaggerated. Brigitte Siatos of Wachs' office began petitioning against dividing the neighborhood but said, "if it gets divided, we want to be part of the new community, it would devalue out property values otherwise." Residents in the east were beginning to petition to be included in the proposed name change.

In November, 1990, another group of about 1000 homeowners living in Northridge but falling within Sepulveda's 91343 ZIP code began to argue for a new ZIP code, having been convinced that being associated with Sepulveda's was lowering their property values; however, the original petitioners did not argue for changing the neighborhood's ZIP code, and local postal officials rejected requests for a ZIP code change. Granada Hills residents echoed sentiments from Northridge residents, with some beginning to petition to include portions of Granada Hills between Lassen and Devonshire in North Hills, excluding the North Hills shopping center, whose shop owners opted to remain members of the Granada Hills Chamber of Commerce.

By April 1991, 2800 residents signed the petition to secede and the petition was presented to councilman Bernson. With 86% of west Sepulveda residents approving the name change, councilman Bernson approved the change, announcing that the name change was official at a news conference on 13 May 1991. North Hills is one of the communities whose support is cited to have helped Bernson's re-election in the 1991 runoff after he lost some support in his district for his backing of development in Porter Ranch. The next day, residents of the remaining Sepulveda, who now felt isolated and stigmatized, renewed their petition to be included in the name change, a campaign that was not welcomed by the new North Hills homeowners. They began with 500 signatures, mostly left over from previous efforts, and would need two-thirds of the approximately 22,000 residents of Sepulveda to sign.

Residents the portion of Northridge west of North Hills continued to advocate for a new ZIP code not associated with a separate neighborhood; on June 17, residents presented a petition signed by more than 1600 of the approximately 2000 residents in the area to councilman Bernson, who passed the request to postal officials. In a meeting with postmaster general Anthony Frank and congressman Elton Gallegly, Bernson appealed postal officials' previous decision denying ZIP code changes to Granada Hills and Northridge and added that the new community of North Hills should receive a new ZIP code separate from Sepulveda. The new ZIP code for North Hills was not expected to pass, and by the end of August, postal officials denied the request; however, officials conceded that the community may use the new name, and suggested to the Northridge petitioners that they may use the name "North Hills" as well. The Northridge group, who had been dubbed "The Northridge Orphans," were dissatisfied, and continued to push for a new ZIP code. The petition for the portion of Granada Hills south of Devonshire Street, bounded by the San Diego Freeway and Balboa Boulevard on the east and west, to become part of the adjacent community of North Hills was approved on August 23.

In the summer of 1991, the Valley 2000 Council, a grass-roots organization sponsored by the Valley Interfaith Council, formed to discuss issues and develop community sentiment in the San Fernando Valley, included discussions of what was seen as increasing balkanization of valley communities, citing North Hills and the ZIP code change requests as an example of the phenomenon. This community balkanization continued to be criticized, and was seen as an attempt by the middle-class of the valley to retain the status-quo and maintain property values as suburban communities were increasingly urbanizing. The new names were also causing complications in postal sorting, leading to confusion and mail delays, and postal authorities continued to complain that the councilmembers were approving the name changes unilaterally and without consultation from the postal service. Meanwhile, a resident in Northridge under Sepulveda's ZIP code felt that postal officials were making exceptions to certain businesses in that community that are allowed to use Northridge in their address while others were being pushed to use North Hills.

On the night of November 21, councilmember Wachs announced to a gathering of about 500 residents in Sepulveda Junior High School that the petition by the remaining east of Sepulveda reached the necessary numbers and was approved. With this, the entirety of the neighborhood formerly named Sepulveda was renamed North Hills. The original petitioners of former west Sepulveda felt that their original intention to establish a separate identity had been subverted, and campaign spokesman Ribons said that the original North Hills residents may sue the city to block the reunion of the neighborhoods, though it was not clear if there was a legal basis for such a suit. Following the second renaming, councilmember Bernson's office called for the establishment of standards, rules, and guidelines for neighborhood name changes. Ribons further argued that the process was unfair, as the east Sepulveda petition collected signatures from apartment dwellers and business owners, not just homeowners as was the case for the west, and the wording of the east petition included mentions of property values, which he qualified as misleading. Meanwhile, some businesses and institutions in the neighborhood opted to continue to use the historic name, including the Sepulveda Unitarian Universalist Society, whose pastor, Charlotte Shivvers, had qualified the original petition as "a racist and classist kind of move," and stated that while she embraced that the entire neighborhood was united again, the society would keep the original name "as a reminder that people can't separate themselves from problems that affect us all." The east Northridge community within the old Sepulveda ZIP code continued to be directed to use North Hills as well as Sepulveda in their addresses, as they were still not able to use Northridge in accordance with postal guidelines.

The city eventually formed a new sub-neighborhood of "North Hills West" which begins west of the 405 freeway and goes to Bull Creek Wash/Balboa Blvd. and from Roscoe Blvd. to Devonshire St. The eastern section became the sub-neighborhood of North Hills East. North Hills East boundaries are east of the 405-San Diego Freeway, along the Pacoima Wash, South of Lassen, and North of Roscoe.

Development continued in the neighborhood, and homebuyers were attracted by its affordable housing and convenient location. The president of the San Fernando Valley Board of Realtors set the median sale price of single-family homes in Sepulveda for March 1991 at $207,000, with 256 active properties on the market in August. Some members of the community felt that the new developments were improving the community and helping to dissipate crime. Residents, including apartment building owners and churches, were forming community watch groups to improve the neighborhood.

In September 1991, despite a pending lawsuit by valley homeowners, Mobil Oil began construction in Granada Hills on a $90-million crude oil pipeline that would run through Granada Hills, North Hills, and Van Nuys. It was part of a 90-mile-long pipeline which carried oil from Mobil's Kern County fields to its refinery in Torrance.

During the 1992 riots, despite pleas for peace from political and religious leaders, sporadic civil unrest occurred throughout the San Fernando Valley, including North Hills. In an appliance store on Parthenia Street, young looters were halted by residents who beat them until police arrived and arrested them. A liquor store near Sepulveda and Nordhoff was also looted soon after a group of 25 police officers swept the sidewalk; the same group of police arrested eight people for refusing to disperse on Columbus and Parthenia, but were forced to retreat as they were surrounded by protesters. Hundreds of Latino residents taunted police in North Hills, chanting Rodney King's name and refusing orders to disperse to their apartments from police in riot gear.

In December 1992, California Market, a supermarket chain based in Los Angeles which catered to the Korean community, opened a location in North Hills on the site of a former Alpha Beta supermarket on Sepulveda Boulevard. Previously, Korean residents had relied on four smaller markets or traveled to Koreatown to do their shopping. This new location along with a new H.K. Supermarket in Van Nuys was planned to serve the approximately 35,000 valley residents of Korean heritage. The owner of California Market, Richard Rhee, also said that he planned to stock products catering to Latino customers. The owners of the existing Korean markets protested the new supermarkets, fearing that they would lose their livelihood.

By 1993, following the name change and riots, more residents and business owners began to participate in crime-watch groups, resident associations, and other community groups to counter crime and urban decay in North Hills. Among community building efforts, a Multi-Cultural Festival was held in May, organized by councilmember Ernani Bernardi, the North Hills Community Coordinating Council and the LAPD in Sepulveda Middle School.

Residents living in streets where barricades were raised in 1989 began to voice concerns over the barricades and in June, 1993, members of the North Hills Community Coordinating Council asked the police department to remove the four barricades in the neighborhood and opposed plans for a new barricade on Orion Street at Nordhoff Street. Residents felt that the barricades were isolating them from the rest of the community, and they were being blamed for the high apartment vacancy rates and low property values. The barricades were also creating what one resident described as "comfort zones" for criminals, as they used the barricades to their advantage, and their use by gangs in Blythe Street which led to the removal of the barricades in March, 1992, there raised even more doubts as to their effectivity in the war on drugs.

In June, 1993, city officials prevented Ramgarhia, a Sikh group, from establishing a place of worship and daycare center in North Hills, citing too much activity on the lot and a detrimental impact to the character of the neighborhood. Residents objected to the establishment, on the grounds of preventing further traffic and noise in the neighborhood. The vice president of the North Hills Community Coordinating Council which headed resident opposition to the establishment stated, "we feel we're being inundated by outsiders and the traffic they bring," referencing the other ethnic churches and places of worship in the neighborhood, and questioned "how many East Indian people or Sikhs live in North Hills." For their part, Sikh community spokesmen felt that the community, having mostly kept to themselves, had failed to reach out to the community to dissipate misunderstandings about their religion which they felt may have accounted for the opposition they received. It would have been the second Sikh religious center in the San Fernando Valley, and the Sikh group issued charges of discrimination and appealed the decision. Despite promises to scale back use in the facility, the appeal was denied.

As a result of the 1994 Northridge earthquake, the Veteran's Hospital in North Hills was forced to close temporarily, with patients having to evacuate to the Long Beach facility; the hardest hit structure in the hospital was the inpatient service building, including intensive care and emergency rooms. Following the earthquake, residents rushed to protect equipment in the North Hills police substation from looters. Residents began to sleep outside of their homes in cars and tents, and while building inspectors and police noted that earthquake damage in North Hills had not been as severe as in other communities, as of January 23, 39 structures were declared unsafe and 77 were designated for limited entry. Some businesses in North Hills remained closed due to lack of potable water supply.

In June 1999, a damaged airplane landed safely on Hayvenhurst Avenue on its way to Van Nuys Airport.

By the year 2000, the neighborhood had a population of 52,333; Compared to 1990, North Hills had a population increase of 22% by the year 2000, among the highest total increase in the Valley, with a significant increase in Latino American (73.7%) and Asian/Pacific Islander (52.6%) residents.

Between January 2010 and January 2011, 300 residents of the community of Woodley Hill signed a petition, initiated by resident Estelle R. Goldman, to separate from North Hills, citing that their issues and property values relate more to Northridge. Woodley Hills is bounded by Lassen and Plummer on the north and south, and by Bull Creek and Woodley on the west and east. The petition was received and filed by the city in April, 2011. The Northridge East Neighborhood Council supported the petition; meanwhile, North Hills West opposed the renaming, stating that property values effects would be minimal and insignificant, that Woodley Hill is a desirable area along with western North Hills and that it would turn Woodley Hill into a less desirable part of Northridge, that stakeholders would potentially want to extend Northridge to the 405 Freeway, that their issues are substantially similar to those of North Hills, and that the change would cause confusion. In early 2012, Goldman stated that she then felt that her statement concerning property values and issues was naïve and she wished to correct it. She amended the reasoning, stating that residents' concerns were that they did not send their children to North Hills Schools, they did not shop in North Hills, and that the nature of the community is purely residential with no businesses or apartments compared to North Hills; she further stated that residents identify more with Northridge because of community interests and socio-economic background. The application eventually gained approval and was adopted on August 3, 2012. While it was initially claimed that neighborhood council boundaries would not be changed, the North Hills West Neighborhood Council approved the transfer of Woodley Hills to Northridge East on March 22, 2013, followed by approval by Northridge East on April 17, and the Board of Neighborhood Commissioners in July.

On December 6, 2014, a celebration was held for the opening of the over 13,000 square foot Nanak Sadan Sikh Temple and Community Center at Nordhoff Street, followed by the celebration of a regular evening diwan.

In late March 2016, a local man, Shehada Issa, murdered his wife, Rabihah, and later his son, Amir "Rocky" Issa, at their home on the 1500 block of Rayen Street in North Hills East. Prosecutors found that Amir's sexual orientation was a motivating factor for his murder, later also classified as a hate crime. It was the second killing of an LGBTQ person in the San Fernando Valley in two years, occurring a year after the murder of a trans woman in neighboring Van Nuys. The murder quickly drew attention from the gay community, and local community group Somos Familia Valle organized a rally on April 4 at Sepulveda Boulevard and Nordhoff Street calling for family acceptance towards LGBTQ children and an end to discrimination and violence in the valley's neighborhoods. In September 2017, Shehada Issa was convicted of two counts of first degree murder with Amir's murder being enhanced as a hate crime, and was sentenced to life in prison; there was an attempt to appeal the conviction, but the state appellate court ruled that there was overwhelming evidence of Issa's guilt and in May 2020 the state's Supreme Court refused to review the case.

As of 2020, about 242 (1.3%) of the approximately 17,977 occupied structures in North Hills were built in 1939 or earlier, 34.9% were built from 1940 to 1959, 34% from 1960 to 1979, 5.2% from 2000 to 2009, 0.9% from 2010 to 2013, and 1% from 2014 or later.

== Government ==
=== Local government ===
North Hills is governed locally by the City of Los Angeles and is represented in the Los Angeles City Council by the members elected for districts 6, 7 and 12; each district includes three different sections of the neighborhood.

Los Angeles City Council Members
Council District	Council Member	Neighborhood area served
City Council District 6	Imelda Padilla	South portion of North Hills East
City Council District 7	Monica Rodriguez	North portion of North Hills East
City Council District 12	John Lee	North Hills West

==== Neighborhood Councils ====
Both North Hills East and North Hills West Neighborhood Councils work together to improve the overall quality of life in North Hills communities.

North Hills West Neighborhood Council was certified in 2003. Their slogan is "Fostering Community," and its logo is of a green tree in the city. The 2012–2014 North Hills West Neighborhood Council was seated into office on September 20, 2012. A northwestern section became part of the Northridge East Neighborhood Council in 2013.

North Hills East Neighborhood Council was certified in 2010. It has a growing, multicultural group of neighbors dedicated to service and community activism. In early 2014, North Hills East Neighborhood Council was approved as an Official Certifying Organization for the President's Volunteer Service Awards program, which is an initiative of the Corporation for National and Community Service, the same organization responsible for AmeriCorps and Senior Corps. This status as an Official Certifying Organization has enabled the North Hills East Neighborhood Council to verify hours and eligibility for volunteers to receive an award, which, depending on number of hours worked can range from a pin to a personalized letter from the President of the United States. More about the awards can be found here: www.presidentialserviceawards.gov Volunteers do not have to be a resident or stakeholder of North Hills East to qualify for a President's Volunteer Service Award.

=== Federal and State legislature representation ===
The neighborhood is represented federally by the congress member elected for California's 29th congressional district and both senators from California. On the state level, it is represented by the state assembly member elected for California's 46th State Assembly District and the state senator elected for California's 20th State Senate district.

Federal representatives
United States Congress
- Tony Cardenas (California's 29th congressional district)
United States Senate
- Laphonza Butler
- Alex Padilla

State representatives
California State Assembly
- Jesse Gabriel (California State Assembly District 46)
California State Senate
- Caroline Menjivar (California State Senate District 20)

== Demographics ==
=== 2020 census ===
In the 2020 census, North Hills had a total population of 53,764 just within its Neighborhood Council boundaries. (Note: This includes people counted in the census tracts and census block groups located within the boundaries of the North Hills West and North Hills East Neighborhood Councils.) The population in the 91343 ZCTA was 62,595; this covers all of North Hills West and most of North Hills East boundaries, while including portions within Northridge East and Granada Hills South's boundaries. The average population density is about 10,591.4 per square mile within the ZTCA's 5.91 square miles. 31,132 people (49.7%) were identified as male and 31,463 (50.3%) as female. The 2020 age distribution was 14,684 people (23.5%) under 18, 6,599 people (10.5%) from 18 to 24, 17,925 people (28.6%) from 25 to 44, 15,458 people (24.7%) from 45 to 64, and 7,929 people (12.7%) who were 65 or older, The median age was 35.8.

==== Housing ====
There were 18,545 housing units, at an average density of 3,137.9 units per square mile, of which 18,117 units were occupied and 428 were vacant. 9,127 occupied units (50.4%) were owned; 7,470 (81.8% of owner-occupied units) were owned with a mortgage or a loan and the remaining 1,657 (18.2%) were owned free and clear. 8,990 units (49.6% of occupied units) were rented. In terms of household size, 2,828 units (14.6%) were 1-person households, 4,005 units (22.1%) had 2 people, 10,281 (56.7%) had 3 to 6 people, and 1,003 (5.5%) had 7 or more. 14,173 units (78.2%) were family households; 8,942 (63.1% of family households) were married couple family households and the remaining 5,231 (36.9%) were occupied by families with unmarried householders. 3,944 units (21.8%) were nonfamily households. Of vacant units, 211 were for rent and 13 were rented but not occupied, 17 were for sale and 21 were sold but not occupied, and 11 were for seasonal, recreational, or occasional use.

==== Race and ethnicity ====
In 2020, the makeup of racial identity in North Hills included: 16,580 (26.5%) people who identified as White, 2,704 (4.3%) as Black or African-American, 1,035 (1.7%) Native American, 9,606 (15.3%) Asian, 98 (0.02%) Pacific Islander, 23,701 (37.9%) identified as other races, and 8,871 (14.2%) as two or more races. 12,012 people identified as Non-Hispanic White (19.2% of total pop., 72.4% of White people).

36,701 people (58.6%) identified as Hispanic or Latino of any race. At 23,290 people, most Latinos (63.5%) identified as some other race, followed by 7,532 (20.5%) who identified with two or more races; 4,568 (12.4%) Latinos identified as White, 966 (3%) identified as Native American, and 166 (0.5%) identified as Black.

=== Other data ===
In 2009, the Los Angeles Times's "Mapping L.A." project supplied these North Hills community statistics: median household income: $52,456. Population size is 60,254 according to 2010 Census data. This summarizes both sides of the 405 freeway. The North Hills West neighborhood had 24,000 residents in 2009. The North Hills East neighborhood had nearly 40,000 residents in 2010.

According to Mapping L.A., Mexican (38.4%) and German (2.8%) were the most common ancestries. Mexico (47.3%) and El Salvador (12.2%) were the most common foreign places of birth in 2000.

The 91343 ZCTA had a 60.9% employment rate and had a median household income of $77,790 according to 2022 estimates.

== Education ==
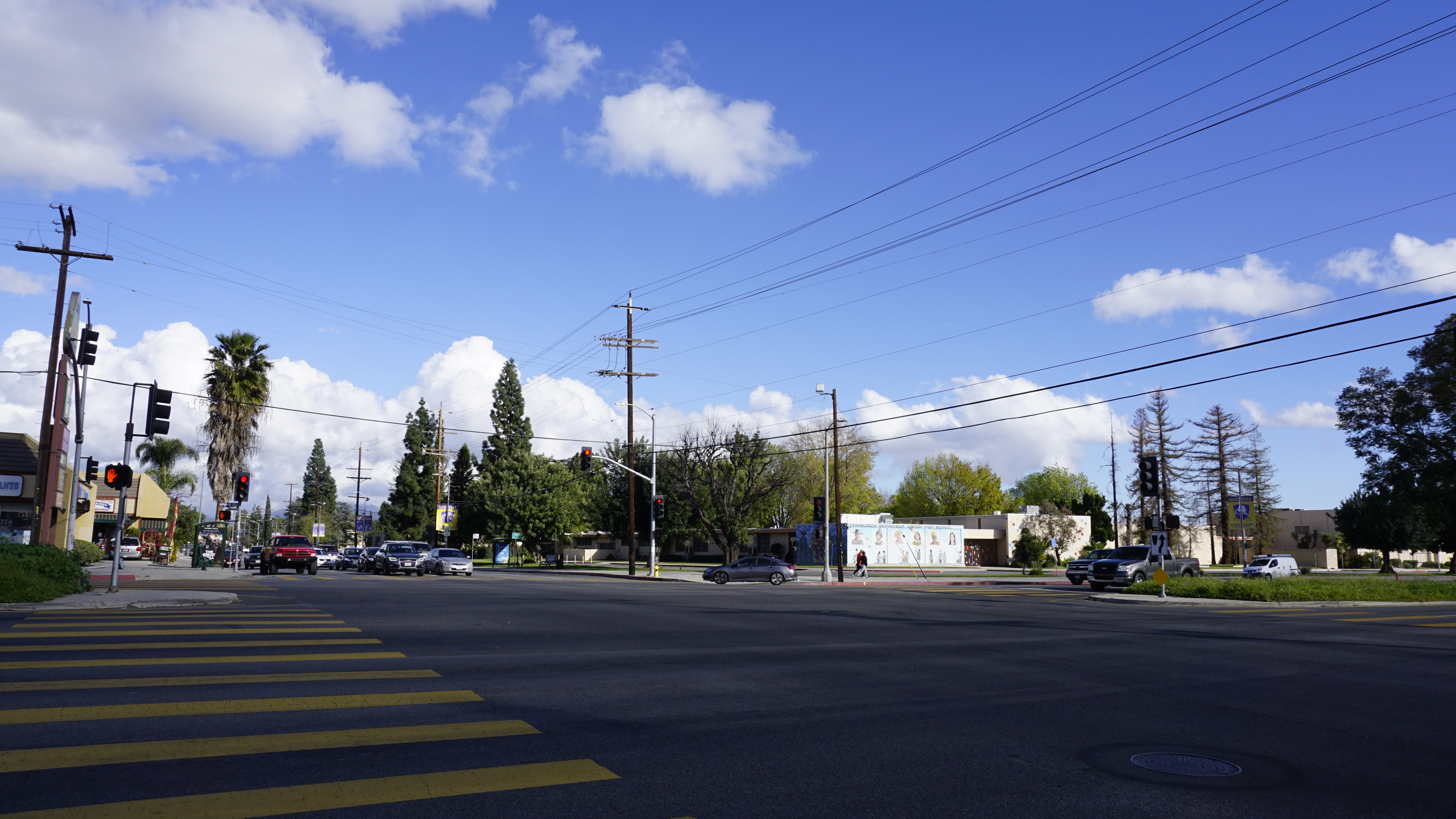
Sepulveda Middle School

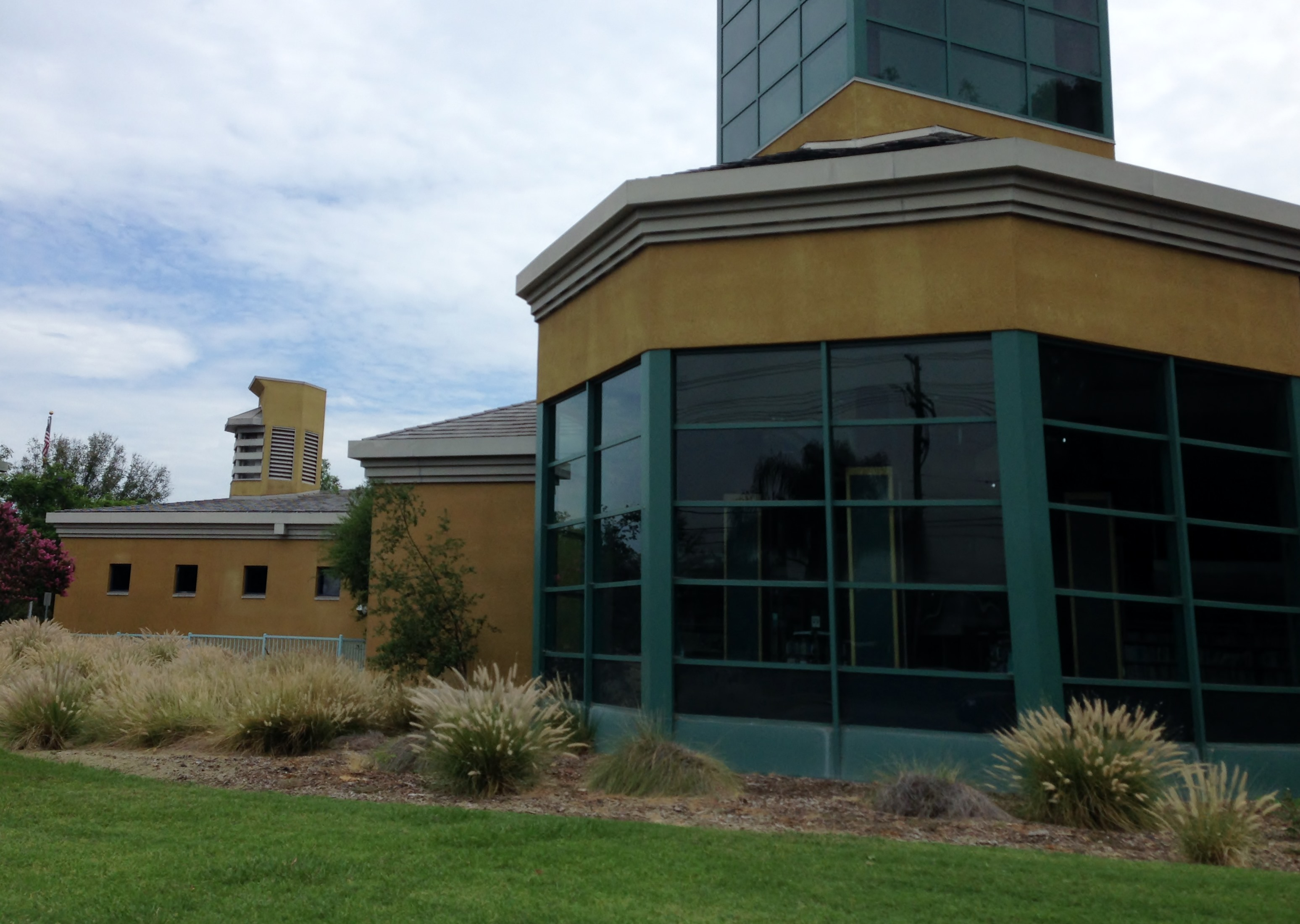
Mid-Valley Regional Branch of the Los Angeles Public Library.

=== Public schools ===
The community is served by schools in the Los Angeles Unified School District.

Gledhill Street Elementary School, Langdon Avenue Elementary School, Mayall Street School, and Parthenia Street School serve North Hills.

Most students attend Sepulveda Middle School. Those students residing west of Woodley Avenue attend Holmes Middle School.

North Hills high school students attend James Monroe High School.

There are magnet programs in some schools, such as the Sepulveda Middle School which has a Gifted / High Ability Magnet, and Kennedy High School which has an Architecture/Digital Arts Magnet. A school bus is provided if pupils are more than 5 miles away from the school. North Hills West is also served by charter schools of all grades.

Public Schools in North Hills
Name	Grades
Mayall Street Elementary	K-5
Vintage Math/Science/Technology Magnet	K-5
Lassen Elementary	K-5
Francisco Sepulveda Middle	6-8
Gledhill Street Elementary	K-5
Albert Einstein Continuation	9-12
Valley Region Elementary No. 12	K-5
Plummer Elementary	K-5
James Monroe High	9-12
Valley Charter Elementary	K-5
Our Community Charter	K-8
Rosa Parks Learning Center	K-5
Langdon Avenue Elementary	K-5
Noble Avenue Elementary	K-5
Vista Middle	6-8

==== Local school district administration ====
North Hills schools are locally administered by the Regional Superintendent for LAUSD Region North. The neighborhood schools are represented in the LAUSD Board of Education by the members for district 3, which covers most of North Hills West, and district 6, which covers North Hills East and a portion of West including Gledhill Street Elementary and Monroe High.

LAUSD Regional Superintendents
Region	Superintendent	Neighborhood area served
North	David Baca	Whole neighborhood

LAUSD Board of Education Board Members
District	Board Member	Neighborhood area served
3	Scott Schmerelson	Most of North Hills West
6	Kelly Gonez	North Hills East and small portion of West

=== Public Charter Schools ===
Valor Academy High School is a free public charter high school in North Hills. It is under the Bright Star Schools administration which operates eight other schools across Los Angeles. Valor Academy Elementary School and Valor Academy Middle School are also in North Hills and within close distance of each other. As of 2025, there are 530 students attending Valor Academy High School.

=== Private schools ===
The private and parochial schools in North Hills include Valley Park Baptist, Valley Presbyterian School, Heritage Christian, Our Lady of Peace, and Church of the Living Word. Los Angeles Baptist High School also serves the community and in 2012, was combined with Heritage Christian High School.

Several North Hills residents serve as host families to international students studying in the US. As of early 2014, about 50 foreign exchange students are attending school in the North Hills area. Host families get to share their way of life and culture with the students, and at the same time learn more about the students and their home countries.

Private Schools in North Hills
Name	Grades
Los Angeles Baptist Middle School/High School	6-12
North Hills Prep	7-12
Valley Presbyterian Elementary	K-6
Our Lady of Peace Elementary	K-8
Centers of Learning	K-12
New Generation	K-6
Holy Martyrs Armenian Elementary	K-5
Valley High School/Site 1	6-12
Valley High School/Site 2	6-12

=== Public library ===
The Los Angeles Public Library Mid-Valley Regional Branch, one of the biggest in the San Fernando Valley, is located on Nordhoff Street at Woodley Avenue in North Hills.

== Infrastructure ==
=== Transport ===
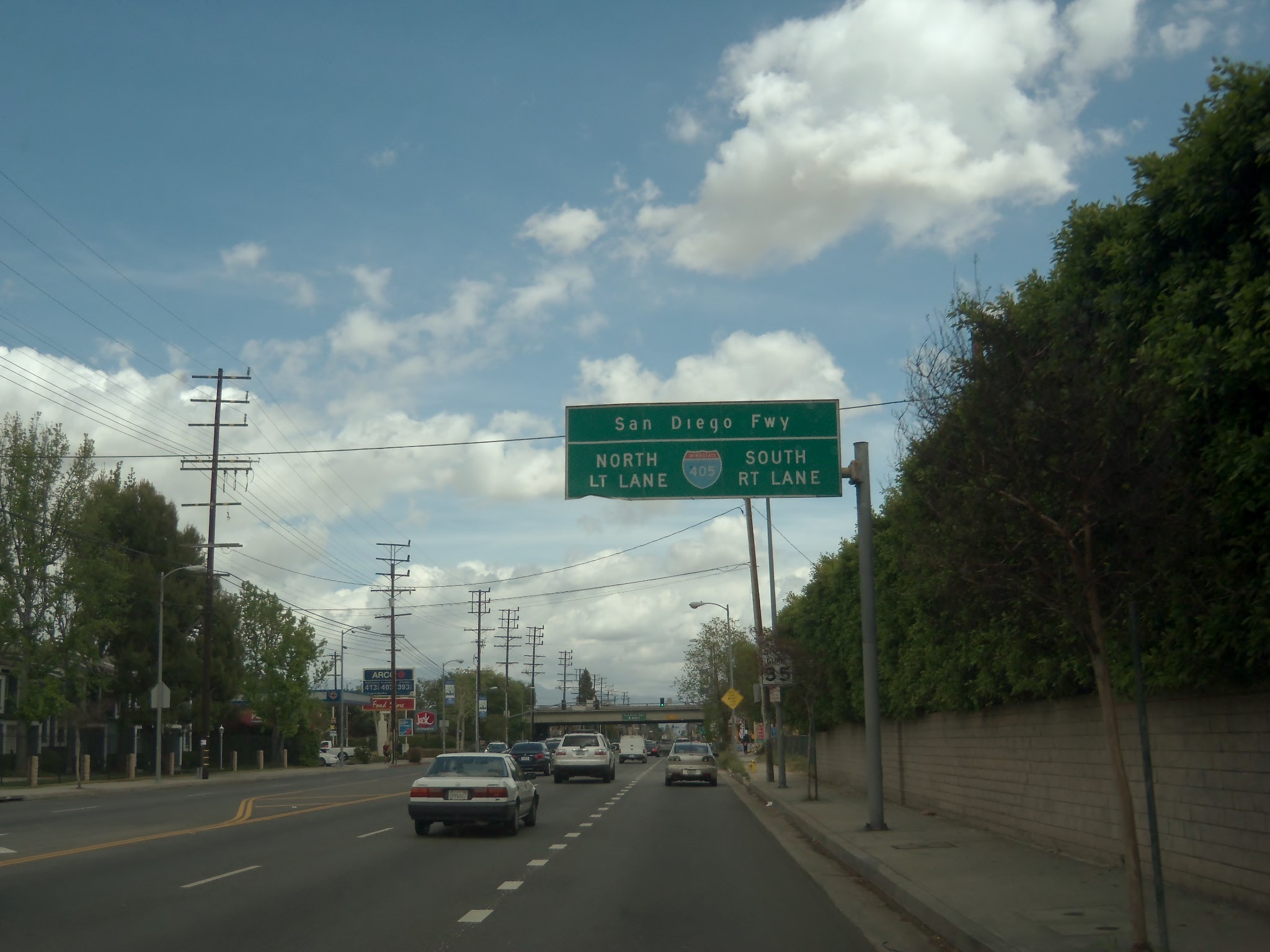
405 Freeway over Nordhoff Street.

California Interstate 405 has direct access to the neighborhood on two points: exit 68 on Roscoe Boulevard and exit 69 on Nordhoff Street. Main thoroughfares include Sepulveda and Roscoe boulevards; Hayvenhurst, Woodley, and Haskell avenues; Lassen, Plummer, and Nordhoff streets. These thoroughfares, as is the case in most of the San Fernando Valley, are arranged in a grid pattern with north–south ways labeled as avenues and east–west ways labeled as streets.

Bicycle infrastructure in the neighborhood includes marked street-side bike lanes on Devonshire Street, on Nordhoff Street starting eastward from Orion Avenue, Parthenia Street eastward from Burnet Avenue, and south–north lanes on Woodley Avenue. Plummer Street is designated as a bike route, allowing cyclists to share space with other vehicular traffic.

The Los Angeles County Metropolitan Transportation Authority operates Metro Bus local lines 152, 166, 167, 234, and 237 through the neighborhood and the Los Angeles Department of Transportation's Panorama City/Van Nuys DASH route also runs through part of the neighborhood.

=== Parks and recreation ===
There are few public parks and recreational facilities within the neighborhood. North Hills Community Park is a 3.895-acre (1.576 ha) recreational space in the more densely populated area of North Hills East, with a children's play areas and sports facilities which host several youth sports programs. The park was established in 2001 as Sepulveda Park West, and it continues to be the only proper recreational park within the neighborhood as of 2024. The Mid-Valley Library in North Hills West is in a 7.5-acre (3.0 ha) site which had been previously dedicated as the Nordhoff Recreation Center in 1978 before funds were available to build the library. The library building and parking spaces covered more than half of the original site when the park became the library campus in 1996, but an open grassy area with paved footpaths and benches remains.

More parkland and recreational facilities are located outside the neighborhood. The large, 10.587-acre (4.284 ha), Sepulveda Recreation Center provides access to parkland and recreational facilities to residents, especially those in North Hills East. Despite sharing North Hills' former name, it is actually located in Panorama City, just outside the neighborhood's east boundary on the Pacoima Wash. Other parks near North Hills East include the Albert Piantanida Intergenerational Center, and Marson Street Pocket Park, both in Panorama City, as well as Devonwood Park in Mission Hills. To the west, Dearborn Park in Northridge also provides recreation and parkland to residents.

In 2022, there was an unsuccessful movement by community members and residents to prevent the construction of a new charter school on Plummer Street in North Hills East and promoting the creation of a park. They cited a desire to preserve and create a public use for a historic house on the site which dates to the settlement of Mission Acres and was designated as a Los Angeles Historic-Cultural Monument, and the lack of green space in the neighborhood. While the house is to be preserved, plans went forward for the construction of the Valor Academy Elementary School.

=== Healthcare ===
North Hills is home to the large Veterans Administration Sepulveda Ambulatory Care Center campus, which serves veterans in the San Fernando Valley, with residential and outpatient care.

== Landmarks ==
A 12 feet (3.7 m) ivy poodle living sculpture is located on a utility pole at Plummer Street and Hayvenhurst Avenue, next to Bull Creek. The poodle was originally sculpted by North Hills resident Brian Welch in the 1980s and it quickly became a local celebrity. The Los Angeles Department of Water and Power ordered the sculpture removed in 1987, but Welch ignored the order. In the 2010s, the Welches began a tradition of turning the poodle to a reindeer each December.

=== Filming locations ===
Many locations in North Hills have been used for various films, including Terminator 2: Judgment Day, Halloween, Halloween II, American Beauty, and Step Brothers. Several of these films shot in the Sepulveda VA Clinic, such as Step Brothers, where the area was used to film a fight between two men and a group of kids. Additionally, one of the most famous moments in Terminator 2: Judgment Day, in which the T-1000 drives a semi-truck through an overpass wall and into a channelized river, was filmed at Bull Creek's Plummer Street/Hayvenhurst Avenue overpass.

== Notable people ==
- Bart Andrus, professional football coach and former collegiate player
- Kerry Rossall, stuntman and actor
- Sharon Shapiro, gymnast

== Bibliography ==
- Gumprecht, Blake (1999). The Los Angeles River: Its Life, Death, and Possible Rebirth. Baltimore, Maryland: Johns Hopkins University Press. ISBN 0-8018-6642-1. OCLC 607227293 – via Internet Archive.
- Jorgensen, Lawrence C. (1982). The San Fernando Valley Past and Present. Los Angeles, California: Pacific Rim Research. ISBN 0-941014-00-2. OCLC 8668305.
- Link, Tom; Cordova-Molmud, Laura; Kelly, Robert J. (1991). Universal City – North Hollywood: a centennial portrait: an illustrated history (1st ed.). Chatsworth, California: Windsor Publications. ISBN 0-89781-393-6. OCLC 22812623.
- Pauley, Kenneth E. (2005). San Fernando, Rey de España : an illustrated history. Spokane, Washington: Arthur H. Clark Company. p. 199. ISBN 978-0-87062-338-7 – via Internet Archive.
- Roderick, Kevin (2002) [2001]. The San Fernando Valley: America's Suburb (2nd ed.). Los Angeles Times Books. ISBN 1-883792-55-X. OCLC 611202438.
