= Mission Acres, California =

Archaic place name in Los Angeles

Coordinates: 34.23564°N 118.47645°W

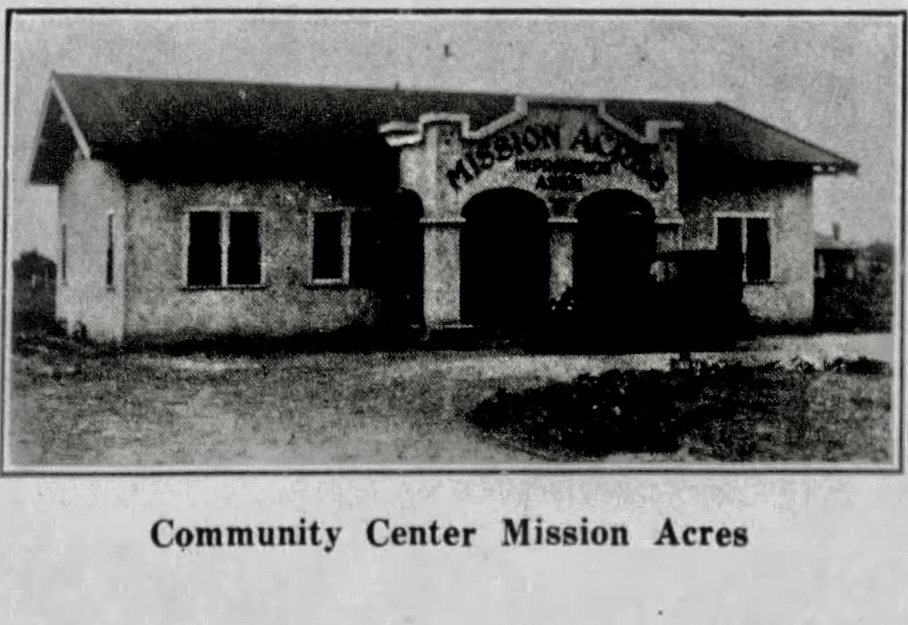
Community Center Mission Acres (The Van Nuys News and Valley Green Sheet, December 19, 1924)

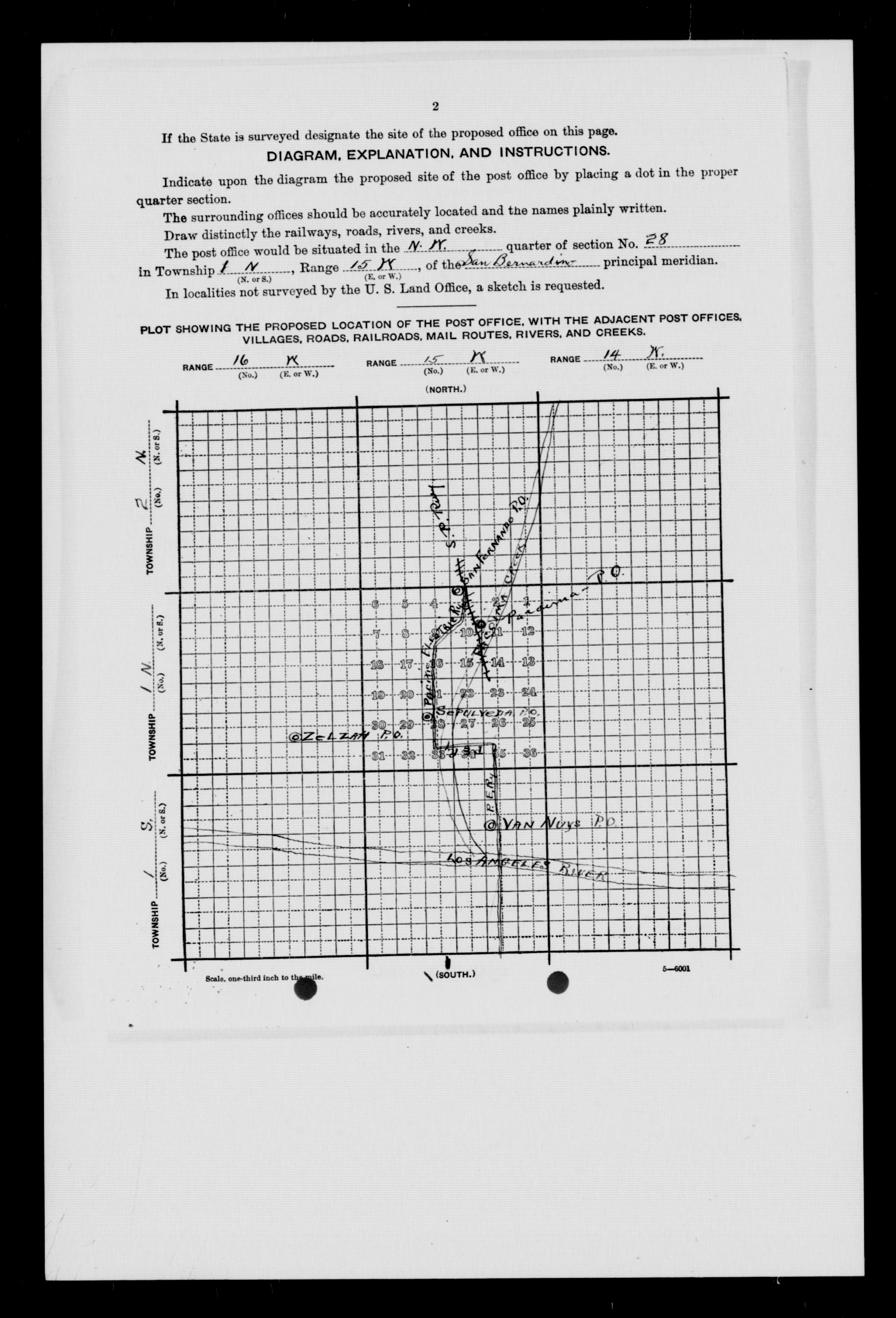
Map attached to 1928 application to establish a post office at Sepulveda, at the Mission Acres railway stop

Mission Acres was a rural community in the northern San Fernando Valley. Its historic boundaries correspond roughly with the former community of Sepulveda and present day community of North Hills within Los Angeles, California. The community's western border was Bull Creek, which flowed south out of Box Canyon in the western San Gabriel Mountains near San Fernando Pass.

== History ==
In the 19th century, the site was originally part of the Mission San Fernando Rey de España, and then the Rancho Ex-Mission San Fernando of Andrés Pico, near the Andrés Pico Adobe.

In the early 20th century, it was accessible from the Pacific Electric Red Car San Fernando Line, a route from Downtown Los Angeles to the ranches, orchards, and towns of the northwestern San Fernando Valley.

The real estate firm Patton & Longley Company advertised the future sale of tracts in the San Fernando Mission Lands called Mission Acres in April 1914. Realtor R. G. Davis, who was recently associated with the Harry H. Culver Company, publicly announced a new affiliation with the Angeles Mesa Land Company as a sales manager in February 1915 as a preliminary to his opening of the Mission Acres tracts which were under preparatory work at the time. The subdivision comprised about 80 acres of the 2,000-acre tract acquired from the San Fernando Mission Land Company; the remaining 3,000 acres held by Angeles Mesa had been subdivided into tracts of 5 to 40 acres for agricultural development and a considerable portion was adapted to citriculture while San Fernando Mission still held about 14,000 acres.

The Mission Acres tracts were opened to the public market by the Angeles Mesa Land Company on Thursday March 4, 1915. As a part of the selling campaign, the company held lectures by experts on poultry culture, squab-raising, Belgian hares and intensive cultivation to prepare potential buyers to use the new land which was advertised as "one of the richest soils sections suburban to Los Angeles." During this time Frank Wiggins, secretary of the Los Angeles Chamber of Commerce owned a 20-acre orange grove in the area along with other notables like Stoddard Jess, vice president of the First National bank who owned a 40-acre lemon grove, and H. R. Wilkinson, secretary of the California Fruit Growers' Exchange who had a 25-acre lemon grove.

The tracts were sold starting at $495 per acre, with $50 being paid up front and $10 per month and free excursions took potential buyers to the site starting on opening day. The main selling points of the site were the fertility of the soil for all kinds of cultivation thanks to the irrigation provided by the new Owens Valley aqueduct as well as its location around the recently completed and spacious boulevard North Sherman Way as well as the Pacific Electric Railway which had stops within the area; this in addition to its proximity to the booming communities of San Fernando and Van Nuys. The company also used the lands' history as part of the San Fernando Mission's land as part of its advertising campaign, describing it as "The 'chosen lands' of the mission fathers". By the first week many sales had been made and several buildings were already under construction. By the end of March $50,000 worth of land in the first single-acre subdivision were sold.

On March 29, 1915, just under a month after the opening of the tracts, the majority of land in the San Fernando Valley were annexed to the City of Los Angeles; this included Mission Acres. The annexation to the city allowed valley farmers to buy surplus water from the Owens Valley aqueduct, this guaranteed a nearly unlimited supply of irrigation water. By the end of October, 28 homes were reported to have been built and the general manager of the sales campaign of San Fernando Mission Lands, Fred W. Forrester, reported that the amount of land sold since opening amounted to $125,400 worth, including 247 acres sold to forty different buyers. The company continued to hold lectures and model acre was being established for the benefit and guidance of purchasers; this model farm was located on an irregular lot west of Columbus Avenue between Parthenia Street and Parthenia Place. Across from the model, east of Columbus, is a half-acre triangular parcel which was being advertised as a prime potential business property; $2,000, the price of the lot, were promised to buyers who built immediately, preferably a grocery, to encourage commercial development of the burgeoning community.

By May 1916, about 50 homes had been built in the vicinity in a year. Angeles Mesa began work on a $5,000 store and café building designed to replicate the San Fernando Mission's convent building; the replica fronted what was then called Brand Boulevard, now Sepulveda. In September 1916, the Los Angeles Board of Education adopted a recommendation that three acres be bought by the board at a cost of $1,200 so that it would be reserved for the eventual construction of a school for Mission Acres.

After two years, the value of land sold amounted to over $1,000,000. At this same time, February 1917, the company initiated another active sales campaign, which this time emphasized the high cost of living in the city compared to the new rural communities, and by the first week $15,000 worth of closed sales were made. The model acre farm continued to attract attention as an example of how an acre of land could be used to sustain a home while producing a surplus for profit; it contained avocados and other fruit trees, vegetables, a model poultry plant, and quarters for pigeons and rabbits. By this time, Mission Acres was recognized by the Los Angeles Times as "one of the best poultry sections of the state."

As the community began to consolidate, the establishment of a new club house was proposed and $2500 of private subscriptions were donated for its construction. Designed by architect Alexander G. Shaw, a resident of the Mission Acres townsite, it was expected to be completed by the end of April 1917. In June, one of the roads that crossed the site, Orange avenue, had its name changed to Betkouski avenue in honor of the president of the city council, Martin F. Betkouski; this change did not satisfy the residents of Orange avenue and so the Mission Acres Improvement Association asked the council to remove the name and substitute it for Burnet avenue, a name which continues to this day.

In August 1918, 50 year old resident J. T. Matthews, who was employed as a watchman at the Newhall tunnel was taken into custody, had his work instruments confiscated, and was charged in violation of the espionage act after neighbors complained of his disagreement with Wilson's declaration of war against Germany. In April 1919, the women's committee of Mission Acres reported $1050 in Victory Drive returns.

=== 1920s ===
The 1920s, especially starting at 1924, brought rapid growth to the community; it was transitioning from subdivision into a full fledged town. By 1921, Mission Acres had a grammar school under the Los Angeles school district. In April 1924, the Woman's Club of Mission Acres was conducting elections and C. M. Beecher was elected club president that month. In mid-1925, the Women's Club had devoted itself to documenting the history and landmarks of the early valley and had interesting historical records among its documents. In September, under an agreement with Victor Girard, the Southern California Gas Company began the installation of gas mains to supply gas to communities in the western San Fernando Valley. Work started at Mission Acres, with the laying of a six-foot main pipe running on Parthenia Street; the company planned to have 36,357 feet of two-inch laterals supplying Mission Acres. In November, residents along Parthenia Street from Woodley Avenue to Gamut Place (Now Parthenia Place) were advised that work would commence on paving that stretch of road. Work on road improvement continued into 1925, with petitioned works including improvements to Plummer Street, Parthenia Street (including a portion which was then called North Sherman Way), and Saugus Avenue (now Sepulveda Boulevard).

For 1925, the City was planning on reforming the city charter to replace the at-large system of voting for city councilmembers with a district system modelled after the 1922 gubernatorial election, with districts that had approximately equal populations. In January 1925, an association of valley chambers of commerce, including Mission Acres, along with other clubs and associations, made a statement to the City Council through a delegation headed by Public Service Commissioner W. P. Whitsett; in their joint statement, they called on the Council's District Representation Map Committee to assure that the valley will be properly represented in the City Council, citing the need for improvements in flood control, bridges, sewer lines, highways, recreation, and transit, as well as the opportunity for improved agricultural development. The new city charter was approved by voters and the reformed City Council was installed on July 1, 1925; the 1st district covered the valley and its first representative under the new charter was councilman Charles Hiram Randall.

In April 1925, city engineer Harvey Arthur Van Norman announced that in the summer of 1925 there would be major road improvements in the San Fernando Valley, including the paving of Saugus Avenue (now called Sepulveda Boulevard) from Ventura Boulevard up to Parthenia Street. This improvement was projected to turn Saugus Avenue, already an important valley highway, into an important artery for Mission Acres and the city of San Fernando to the north. Improvement on Saugus Avenue was also projected to extend up to Brand Boulevard, but before work could commence, a 100-foot dedication had to be made by property owners along the road, which then had dedications ranging from 25 to 40 feet. Later in 1925, it was announced that the Sepulveda Road was to be extended into the San Fernando Valley through the Sepulveda Pass, creating a direct route from the Harbor district and the coastal areas of the Los Angeles Basin to the Valley. This development also became a topic of discussion by the community chamber of commerce. The road known until then as Saugus Avenue would become Sepulveda Boulevard. By the end of January, 1926, the portion of the highway from Gamut Place (Near Rayen Street) down nearly to the Los Angeles River had been completed.

By March 1925, residents of Mission Acres were becoming more vocal about wanting to change the name of the community; according to the LA Times, they believed that Mission Acres was "nor the right sort of designation for a growing community." L. C. Hine, president of the Mission Acres Chamber of Commerce, planned to circulate a petition to determine whether or not a new name would be chosen. In May 1925, the chamber of commerce of Mission Acres called a mass meeting to change the town name.

1926 brought notable events to the Mission Acres community, most notably the completion of a large swath of the Saugus Avenue improvement project along with the paving of more local roads. On January 2, 1926, the Mission Acres post office was formally opened at 8893 Gamut Place, being a sub-office of the San Fernando post office with Mrs. Viva Williams in charge. By June 1926, Burnet Avenue from Roscoe to Lassen, and Rayen Street from Brand Boulevard to Noble, had been paved, providing more local arteries to the community. During a convention of editors, the leading valley residents turned out on July 2 to take part in the reception of 600 editors from across the country upon their visit to the valley; the Valley Scribes Club moved to have residents wear Spanish style costumes during their visit. In August, Mission Acres coordinated with Van Nuys and San Fernando to prevent the proliferation of puncture vine which, as the name suggests, threatened motorists' car tires. The weed had been spreading quickly and valley residents were being instructed how to grub up and burn it; local high school teacher, Seth F. Van Patten, gathered specimens of the weeds and took them to public places where those unfamiliar with it could learn to identify it. In September 3, 1926, the chamber of commerce sent an endorsement of councilman Randall's bond issue proposal to build a trunk line sewer through the San Fernando Valley.

In February 1927, heavy rains caused severe flooding in valley communities and washed away portions of the unfinished Sepulveda Boulevard. The chambers of commerce of Van Nuys and Mission Acres, who bore the brunt of flooding, conducted meetings and determined to start a plan for a drainage system to protect the central valley from rainwater.

Residents of Mission Acres renamed the area Sepulveda in 1927. A year before, it had been decided to name the town Brand; however, some residents objected and rallied around the name Sepulveda because of the new Sepulveda Boulevard which passed through the town. The formal changing of the name was celebrated on May 6 with a barbecue. According to Alexander G. Shaw, a long-time resident, there was some division and confusion regarding the new name. Some residents felt that the community would soon face a new name change soon. Meanwhile, the community had been confused for another location called Sepulveda which was located between Burbank and Glendale according to a Rand, McNally map. In 1930 the Los Angeles Times commented, "Sepulveda was once small station siding over in the eastern part of the valley. The Sepulveda of today is now in the central part of the valley, being the name taken by the old Mission Acres section when residents about three years ago decided to give the old settlement a new cognomen in honor of the famous California family. At the time of the name change everybody apparently had forgotten that the old railway siding ten miles to the east still flourishes under such title."

Shaded by coast live oaks (Quercus agrifolia) and California two-petal ash (Fraxinus dipetala), major products were citrus, eggs, whiteface cattle, quail, truck produce, and gladioli.

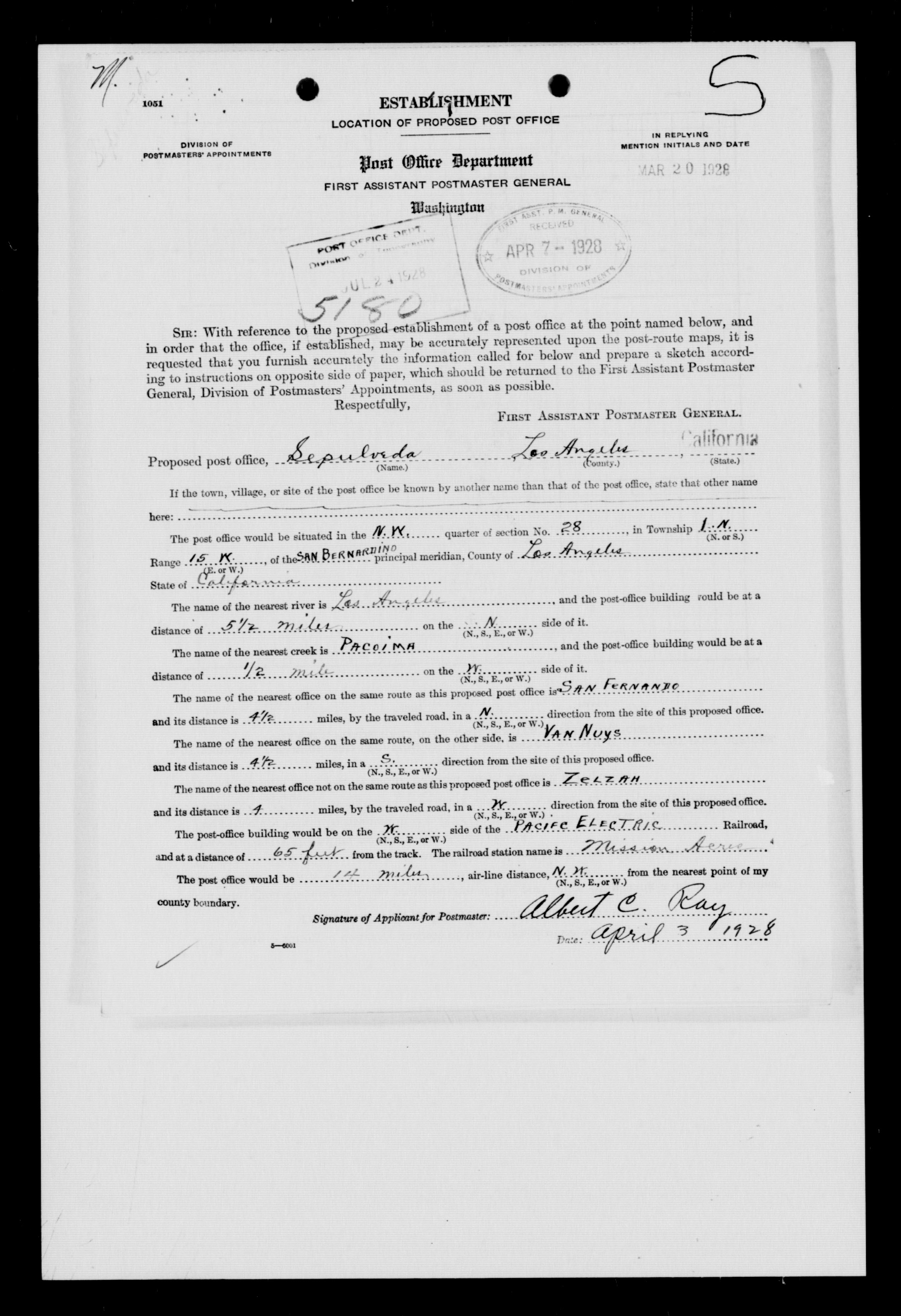
Additional detail from 1928 post office application

== See also ==
- San Fernando Valley Historical Society

== Bibliography ==
- Roderick, Kevin (2001). San Fernando Valley: America's Suburb. Los Angeles Times Books. ISBN 1-883792-55-X.
