= Van Norman Dams =

Former dam complex in Los Angeles County, California, US

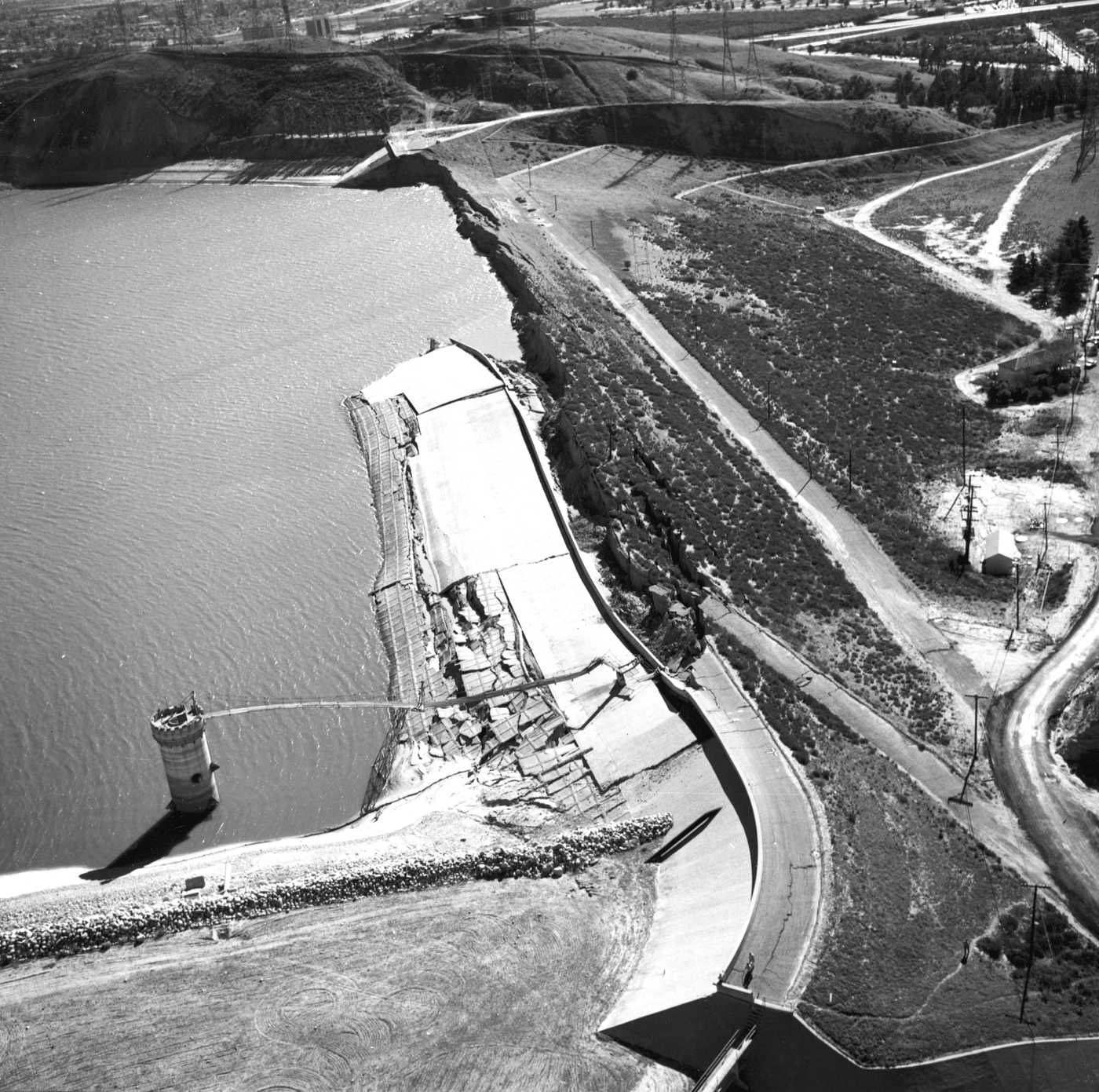
- An oblique aerial view of the Lower Van Norman Dam, taken after the February 9, 1971, San Fernando Earthquake
- Interactive map of Van Norman Dams
- Country: United States
- Location: Los Angeles County, California
- Coordinates: 34.2862°N 118.4796°W
- Purpose: Water supply
- Status: Decommissioned
- Construction began: 1919; 107 years ago (upper dam); 1911; 115 years ago (lower dam)
- Opening date: 1921; 105 years ago (upper dam); November 5, 1913; 112 years ago (lower dam)
- Demolition date: February 9, 1971; 55 years ago
- Built by: Los Angeles Bureau of Water Works and Supply

Upper dam and spillways
- Type of dam: Earth fill dam
- Impounds: Los Angeles Aqueduct; Bull Creek
- Height (foundation): 60 feet (18 m)
- Length: 1,200 feet (370 m)
- Elevation at crest: 1,218 feet (371 m)
- Width (crest): 20 feet (6.1 m)

Upper reservoir
- Total capacity: 1,800 acre⋅ft (2.2×10^{6} m^{3})
- Normal elevation: 1,213.2 feet (369.8 m)

Lower dam and spillways
- Type of dam: Earth fill dam
- Height (foundation): 142 feet (43 m)
- Length: 2,080 feet (630 m)
- Elevation at crest: 1,144.6 feet (348.9 m)

Lower reservoir
- Total capacity: 20,000 acre⋅ft (25×10^{6} m^{3})
- Normal elevation: 1,134.6 feet (345.8 m)

Power Station
- Commission date: October 1922
- Type: Conventional
- Turbines: 2× 2.8 MW

The Van Norman Dams, also known as the San Fernando Dams, were the terminus of the Los Angeles Aqueduct, supplying about 80 percent of Los Angeles' water, until they were damaged in the 1971 San Fernando earthquake and were subsequently decommissioned due to the inherent instability of the site and their location directly above heavily populated areas.

== Construction ==
The Upper Van Norman Dam initially was constructed with 42 feet (13 m) of hydraulic fill. In 1922, the dam was raised 18 feet (5.5 m) with rolled fill.

The Lower Van Norman Dam was constructed with hydraulic and rolled fill. Hydraulic fill height was about 102.4 feet (31.2 m), while rolled fill was added at least five times in the dam's history, each time increasing the dam's height, totaling 39.6 feet (12.1 m) rolled fill. The last addition was made in 1929–30.

== 1971 San Fernando earthquake ==
The 1971 San Fernando earthquake significantly damaged the dams, resulting in evacuation of thousands of people from the San Fernando Valley immediately below. 80,000 were evacuated for three days. Later, it was estimated that a dam failure could have killed 123,400.

=== Upper Van Norman dam ===
The Upper Van Norman reservoir was operating at about one-third capacity at the time of the earthquake. The quake lowered dam height 3 feet (0.91 m) and displaced the dam laterally 5 feet (1.5 m).

=== Lower Van Norman dam ===
Originally, the Lower Van Norman reservoir was operated near full capacity of 1,134.6 feet (345.8 m). However, the maximum operating height was reduced to 1,125 feet (343 m) in 1966 following seismic hazard review. Fortuitously, at the time of the 1971 San Fernando earthquake the water height was 1,109 feet (338 m) (about half capacity: 3.6 billion US gallons (14×10^{6} m^{3}) of water) as a large landslide fell into the reservoir along with 30 feet (9.1 m) of the crest and upstream face reducing the freeboard to about 5 feet (1.5 m). This failure was predominantly due to liquefaction of the hydraulic fill. To reduce the risk of catastrophic failure, the water level was lowered as rapidly as possible, 13.5 feet (4.1 m) in 3 1/2 days, at the rate of 700 cubic feet per second (20 m^{3}/s). This rate was limited by earthquake damage to the outlet lines and drainage towers.

== Aftermath ==
Reconstruction was proposed, but abandoned after geologic evaluation showed the inherent instability of the dams' foundations.

As a replacement, the Los Angeles Dam was constructed between the original Lower and Upper Van Norman Dam structures in a more stable location. During the 1994 Northridge earthquake, the Lower Van Norman reservoir area was again severely damaged, but as then it was in use only as a holding basin, the consequences were minor.

== Lessons learned ==
The near failure of the Lower Van Norman Dam brought about major changes in the way public agencies and engineers viewed seismic safety, particularly regarding embankments of fine sands and silts and numeric dynamic analysis of dams. Also, it resulted in many mandated dam safety reassessments.

== See also ==
- List of dams and reservoirs in California
- Dam failure
- Baldwin Hills Reservoir
- St. Francis Dam
