= Bicycle transportation planning in the San Francisco Bay Area =

Like many metropolitan regions in the United States, the San Francisco Bay Area is politically fragmented into many local jurisdictions. There is one regional transportation planning agency, the Metropolitan Transportation Commission, but there are 9 counties, 85 cities, and 16 towns, each separately responsible for making bicycle infrastructure improvements. A few of these jurisdictions publish and implement their own bicycle plans, while most defer this responsibility to the county or the region in which they are situated. Written bicycle plans are required to qualify for many sources of funding from regional, state, and federal agencies.

== Region ==
Created by the California state legislature in 1970, the Metropolitan Transportation Commission is the transportation planning, coordinating, and financing agency for the San Francisco Bay Area, defined as the nine counties that border the San Francisco Bay. This agency plans and distributes funds to projects throughout the region for all modes of transportation: automobile, transit, bicycle, and pedestrian. Their 2009 Regional Bicycle Plan Update is an update to their original 2001 Regional Bicycle Plan. Its principal goals are "to ensure that bicycling is a safe, convenient, and practical means of transportation and healthy recreation throughout the Bay Area, reduce traffic congestion and risk of climate change, and increase opportunities for physical activity to improve public health." It surveys the existing Regional Bikeway Network (47% completed), summarizes bicycle access to public transit, and lists anticipated bicycle projects (called "Unbuilt Regional Bikeway Network links") and their costs.

== Counties ==
Each of the nine counties in the San Francisco Bay Area has developed a bicycle plan. Except for Marin County, each plan is countywide, meaning it covers both incorporated and unincorporated areas of the county. Marin County's plan only covers the unincorporated areas. Six of the counties fund their bicycle programs with dedicated sales taxes, and three of the counties have full-time bicycle program coordinators. Details for each of the counties' bicycle plans are summarized in the table below.

County	Plan name	Year adopted	Bicycle coordinator	Sales tax measure	Measure expiration	Annual revenue
Alameda	Alameda Countywide Bicycle Plan	2006	yes	Measure B	2022	$4,000,000
Contra Costa	Contra Costa Countywide Bicycle and Pedestrian Plan	2009	no	Measure J	2034	$1,200,000
Marin	Marin County Unincorporated Area Bicycle and Pedestrian Master Plan	2008	no	Measure A	2025	$600,000
Napa	Napa Countywide Bicycle Plan	2003	no	none	none	none
San Francisco	San Francisco Bicycle Plan	2009	yes	Proposition K	2034	$3,000,000
San Mateo	San Mateo County Comprehensive Bicycle Route Plan	2000	no	Measure A	2033	$1,800,000
Santa Clara	Santa Clara Countywide Bicycle Plan	2008	yes	none	none	none
Solano	Solano Countywide Bicycle Plan	2004	no	none	none	none
Sonoma	Sonoma County Transportation Authority Countywide Bicycle and Pedestrian Master Plan	2008	no	Measure M	2025	$1,000,000

== See also ==
- Bicycle transportation planning in Los Angeles
