= Pacoima Dam =

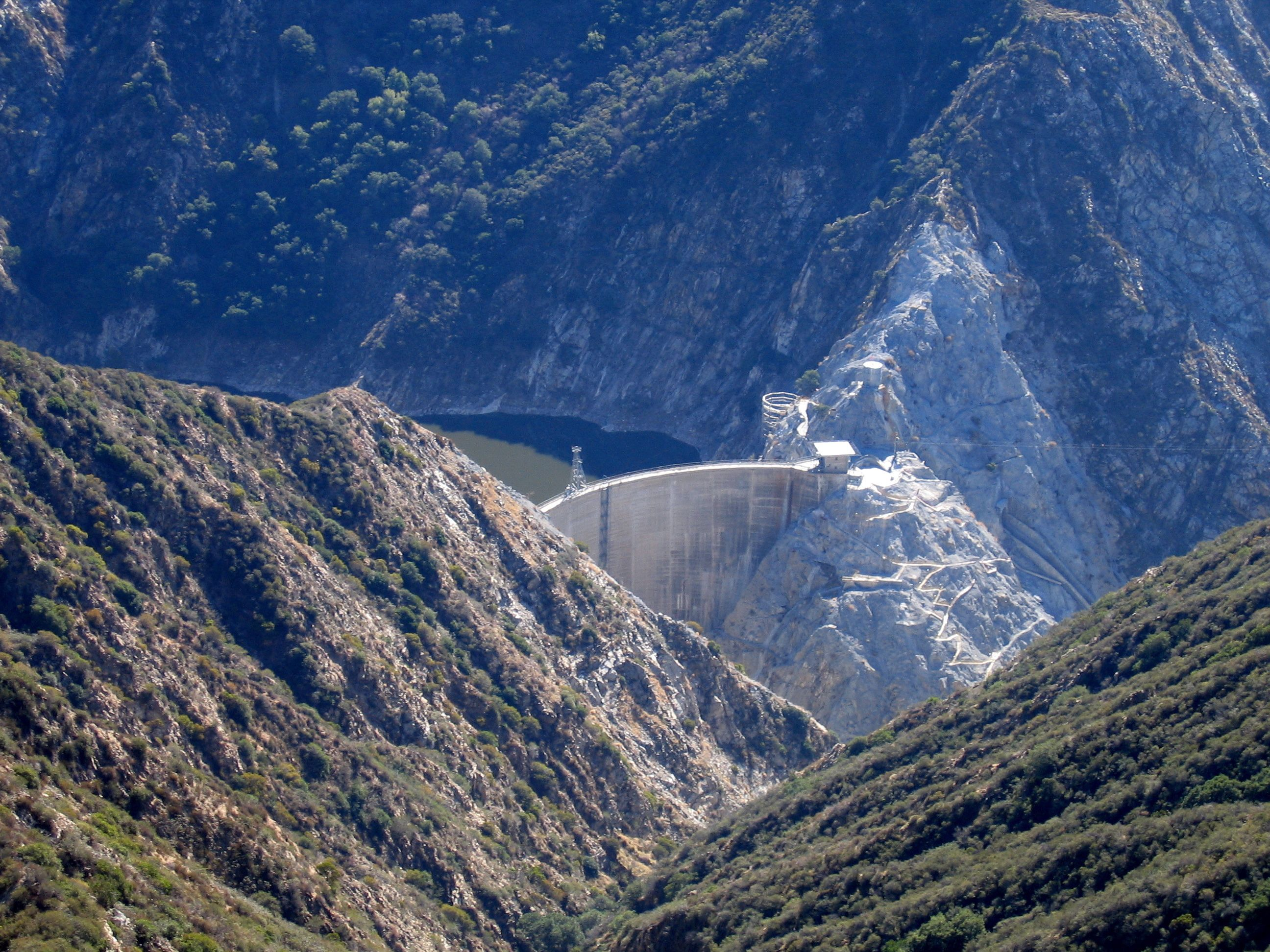
- The Pacoima Dam, viewed from Contract Point.
- Interactive map of Pacoima Dam
- Country: United States
- Location: Los Angeles County, California
- Coordinates: 34°20′05″N 118°23′47″W
- Status: In use
- Construction began: 1925; 101 years ago
- Opening date: 1928; 98 years ago
- Owner: Los Angeles County Department of Public Works

Dam and spillways
- Type of dam: arch
- Impounds: Pacoima Creek
- Height: 371 feet (113 m)
- Length: 640 feet (200 m)
- Spillways: 1
- Spillway type: Service, concrete tunnel
- Spillway capacity: 24,700 cubic feet per second (700 m^{3}/s)

Reservoir
- Creates: Pacoima Reservoir
- Total capacity: 3,777 acre⋅ft (4,659,000 m^{3})
- Catchment area: 27.8 square miles (72 km^{2})
- Surface area: 68 acres (28 ha)

Pacoima Dam is a concrete arch dam on Pacoima Creek in the San Gabriel Mountains, in Los Angeles County, California. The reservoir it creates, Pacoima Reservoir, has a capacity of 3,777 acre⋅ft (4,659,000 m^{3})

Built by the Los Angeles County Flood Control District, which became part of the Department of Public Works, it was completed in 1928. At the time, the 371 foot (113m) high dam was the tallest arch dam in the U.S.

The dam is situated approximately 1 mile (1.6 km) northeast of Sylmar, above the San Fernando Valley. As a flood control structure, district routinely compensates for hydraulic deficiencies in downstream areas by restraining flows of stormwater released from the dam.

== Instrumentation ==
As construction of Pacoima Dam began, the County of Los Angeles hired Roy W. Carlson as their concrete and soil testing engineer. He developed the world's first strain meter which could be embedded in concrete. He also developed an adiabatic calorimeter and electrical-resistance thermometers to find why the temperature of concrete increased during curing and how best to avoid cracking caused by these stresses.

== Earthquake monitoring ==
The Pacoima Dam withstood, but was damaged by the very strong (>1 g) ground movement which occurred during both the 1971 San Fernando and 1994 Northridge earthquakes. Because of concerns about the stability of the dam and especially its response to potential future earthquakes, the County of Los Angeles, with the technical support of the USGS, began monitoring the dam using continuous GPS.

== See also ==
- Angeles National Forest
- List of dams and reservoirs in California
- List of lakes in California
