= Charles Nordhoff (journalist) =

American journalist (1830–1901)

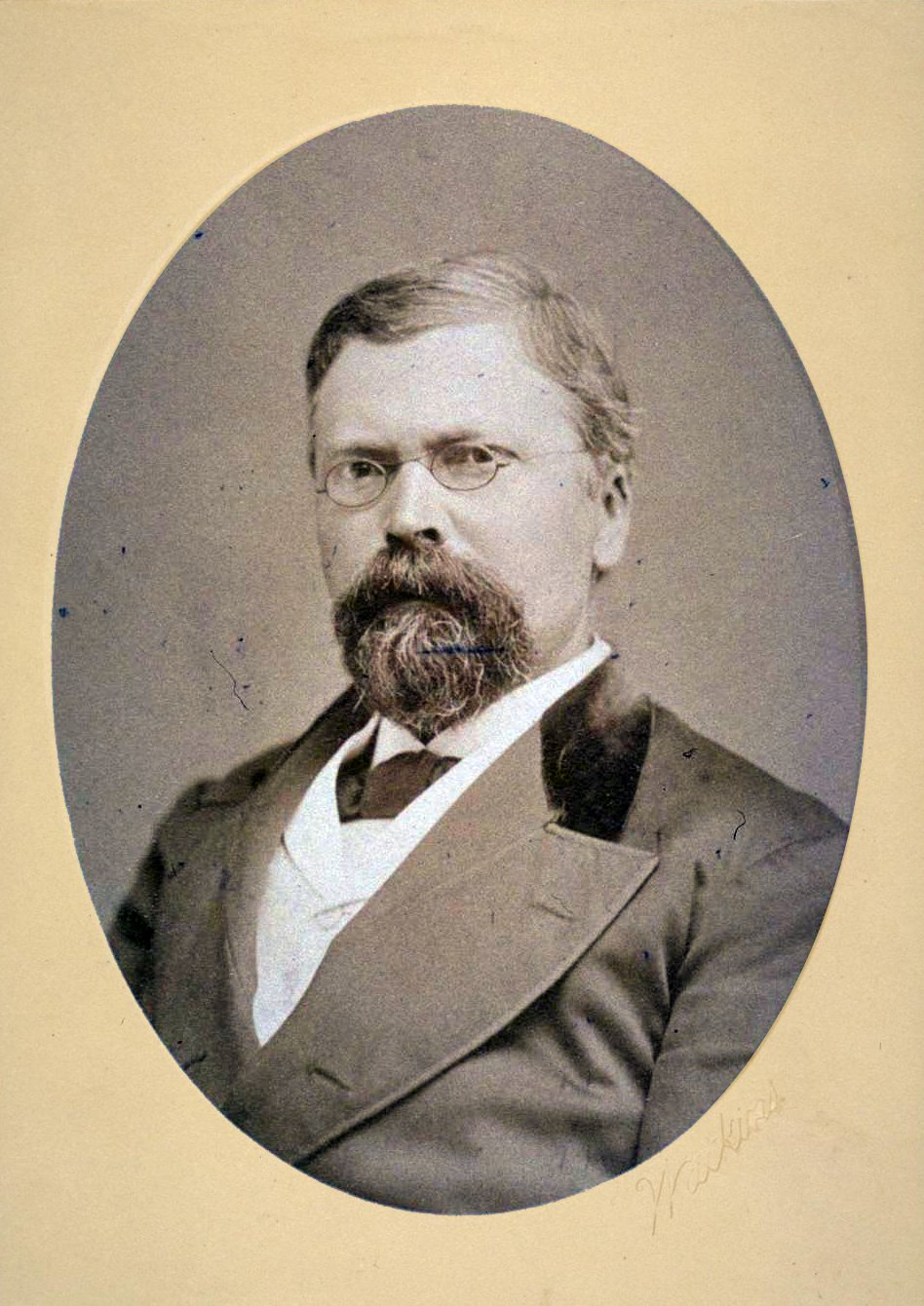
Charles Nordhoff; photograph by Carleton Watkins

Charles Nordhoff (31 August 1830 – 14 July 1901) was an American journalist, descriptive and miscellaneous writer.

== Biography ==
He was born in Erwitte, Kingdom of Prussia, in 1830, and emigrated to the United States with his parents in 1835. He was educated in Cincinnati, and apprenticed to a printer in 1843. In 1844, he went to Philadelphia where he worked for a short time in a newspaper office.

He then joined the United States Navy in 1845 (aged 15), where he served three years and made a voyage around the world in the USS Columbus (1819), which was engaged in first attempts at opening up Japan to the U.S.A., and in establishing full diplomatic relations with China. After his Navy service, he remained at sea from 1847 in the merchant service, and then whaling, mackerel fishery ships until 1854 (aged 24).

From 1853 to 1857, he worked in various newspaper offices, first in Philadelphia, then in Indianapolis. He was then employed editorially by Harpers from 1857 to 1861, when he went to work on the staff of the New York Evening Post from 1861 to 1871; he later contributed to the New York Tribune.

From 1871 to 1873 Nordhoff traveled in California and visited the Hawaiian Kingdom. He then became Washington correspondent of the New York Herald 1874-1890. Nordhoff died in San Francisco, California.

The Valley of Cross Purposes, an extensive biography by Carol Frost, was published in 2017.

== Family ==
He was the father of Walter Nordhoff (1855-1937), author of The Journey of the Flame, penned under the name "Antonio de Fierro Blanco", and of Evelyn Hunter Nordhoff (ca. 1865–1898), America's first female bookbinder and printmaker.

He was the grandfather of Charles Bernard Nordhoff, co-author of Mutiny on the Bounty.

== Legacy ==
Nordhoff High School in Ojai, California and Nordhoff Street in the San Fernando Valley of Los Angeles are named in his honor. Ojai, California, was formerly named Nordhoff.

Nordhoff is a major character in Gore Vidal's historical novel, 1876.

== Works ==
His most widely known books are Communistic Societies of The United States, and California for Health, Pleasure and Residence.

- Kern, Practical Landscape Gardening, editor (Cincinnati, 1855)
- Man-of-War Life: a Boy's Experience in the U. S. Navy, largely autobiographical (Cincinnati, 1855)
- The Merchant Vessel (1855)
- Whaling and Fishing (1855; new edition, 1903)
- Nine Years as a Sailor (1857)
- Stories from the Island World (New York, 1857)
- Secession Is Rebellion: the Union Indissoluble (1860)
- The Freedmen of South Carolina: Some Account of their Appearance, Character, Condition, and Customs (1863)
- America for Free Working Men! (1865)
- Cape Cod and All Along Shore, a collection of stories (1868)
- California: For Health, Pleasure, and Residence (1873)
- Northern California, Oregon, and the Sandwich Islands (1874)
- Politics for Young Americans (1875) This was adopted as a school textbook.
- The Communistic Societies of the United States (1875)
- The Cotton States in the Spring and Summer of 1875 (1876)
- God and the Future Life (1881)
- A Guide to California, the Golden State (1883)
- The merchant vessel - a sailor boy's voyages around the world (1884)
- Peninsular California (1888)
