= Bull Creek (Los Angeles County) =

Coordinates: 34.17889°N 118.49786°W

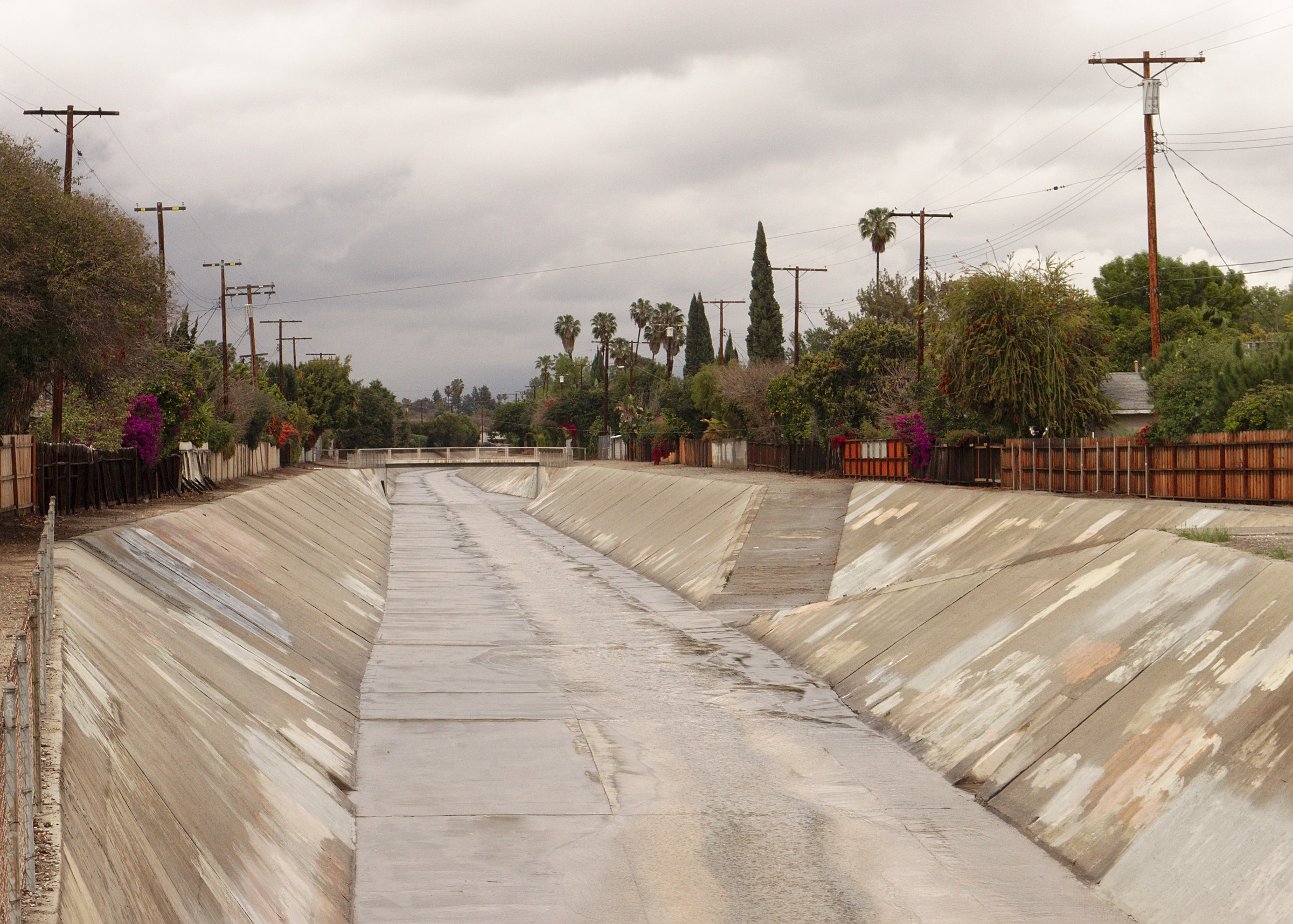
- Bull Creek, looking north from Victory Blvd.

Location
- Country: United States

Physical characteristics
- Source
  - location: Granada Hills, California
- Mouth
  - location: Los Angeles River, California

Bull Creek is a 9.6-mile-long (15.4 km) tributary of the Los Angeles River in the San Fernando Valley of Los Angeles County, California.

The creek rises in Bull Canyon on Oat Mountain. After leaving its canyon, it is encased in a concrete flood control channel, wherein it runs south from Granada Hills though North Hills, Van Nuys (including its airport), and Lake Balboa. South of Victory Boulevard, the river reverts to a free-flowing stream and joins the Los Angeles River inside the Sepulveda Dam Recreation Area. Since 2009 this section has been restored under a federally funded ecosystem restoration project, in part to protect the important riparian habitat.

In 1971, on the morning of the Sylmar earthquake, residents of Granada Hills, Northridge, North Hills, and Van Nuys who were living between Balboa Boulevard and the San Diego Freeway were evacuated after the Lower Van Norman Dam nearly broke. However, a great flood down the banks of Bull Creek was averted.

In 1991, part of the truck chase scenes from Terminator 2: Judgment Day were filmed in Bull Creek, starting at the Hayvenhurst Avenue/Plummer Street crossing.

== Crossings and tributaries ==
From mouth to source (year built in parentheses):

- Road in Lake Balboa Park
- Metro G Line
- Bicycle path
- Victory Boulevard (1955)
- Haynes Street [Pedestrian Bridge]
- Vanowen Street (1954)
- Sherman Way (1954)
- Saticoy Street (1954)
- Stagg Street (1955)
- Road in Van Nuys Airport
- Taxiway in Van Nuys Airport
- Roscoe Boulevard (1955)
- Railroad: Union Pacific Coast Line
- Parthenia Street (1955)
- Nordhoff Street (1955)
- Hayvenhurst Avenue & Plummer Street (1974)
- Granada Channel enters
- Lassen Street (1973)
- Mayall Street [Pedestrian Bridge]
- Devonshire Street (1956)
- Chatsworth Street (1956)
- Celtic Street (1976)
- Bull Creek Canyon Channel Bridge carrying State Route 118 (Ronald Reagan Freeway) - twin bridges (original 1978, rebuilt 1994 after the Northridge earthquake)
- San Fernando Mission Road (1962)
- John F. Kennedy High School
- Simonds Street (1978)
- Rinaldi Street & Woodley Avenue (1962)
- Stranwood Avenue
