= Pacoima Wash =

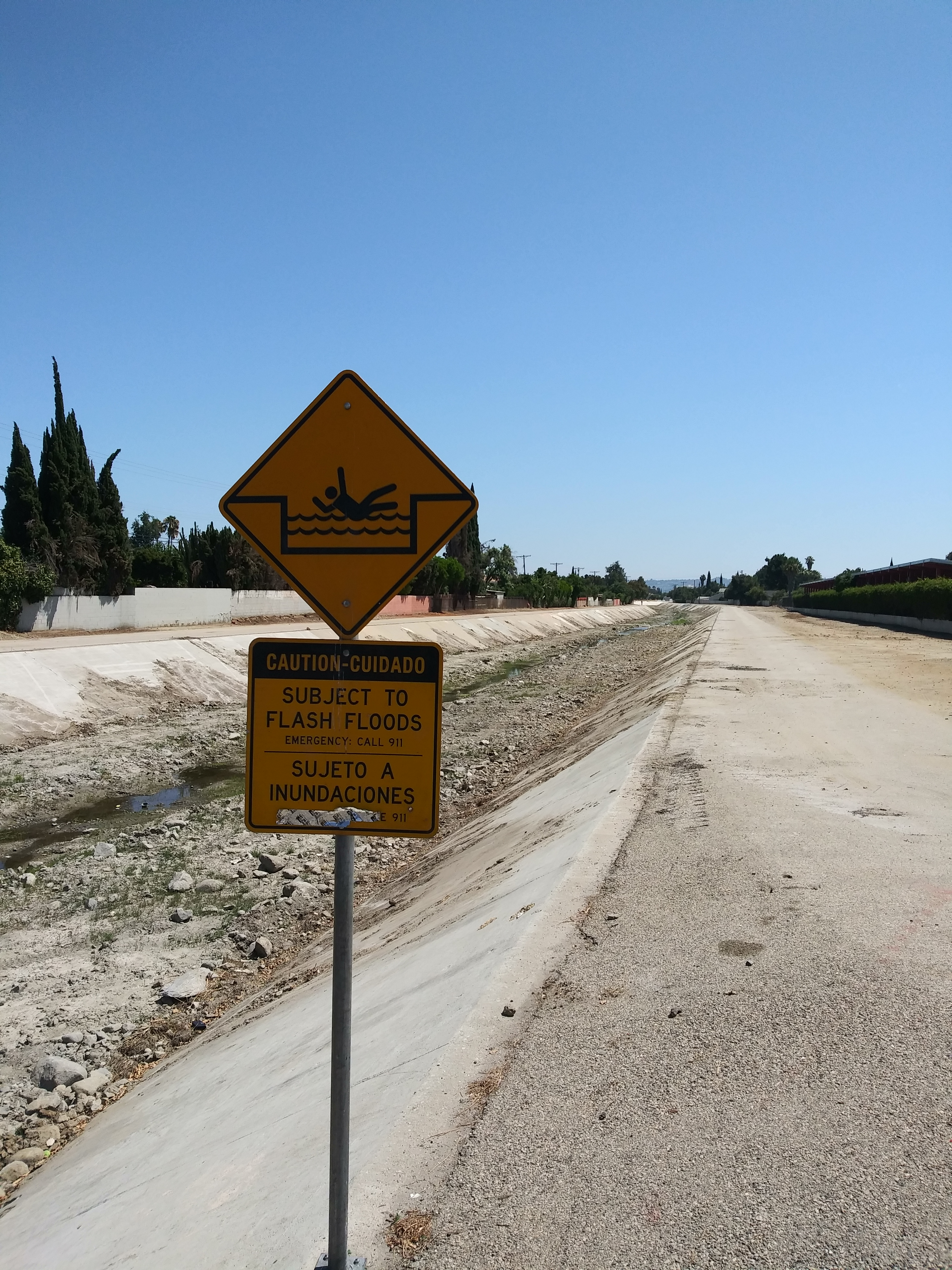
- Pacoima Wash in Panorama City

Location
- Country: United States

Physical characteristics
- Source
  - location: Pacoima Dam, California
  - elevation: 1,990 feet (610 m)
- Mouth
  - location: Tujunga Wash, California

Pacoima Wash, 33 miles (53 km) long, is a major tributary of the Tujunga Wash, itself a tributary of the Los Angeles River, in the San Fernando Valley of Los Angeles County, California.

The stream begins at Mount Gleason, elevation: 6,502 ft (1,982 m), in the western San Gabriel Mountains of the Angeles National Forest. The upper reaches, sometimes known as Pacoima Creek, flow through Pacoima Canyon as a rapid mountain stream. It then reaches the Pacoima Dam Reservoir in the western San Gabriel Mountains of the Angeles National Forest and proceeds south in a free-flowing stream alongside Pacoima Trail Road. Below the dam, it is generally known as the Pacoima Wash. From there, it joins several other unnamed streams that drain the nearby mountains, collecting at Lopez Dam. South of that dam, Pacoima Wash is encased in a concrete flood control channel, and travels south from Kagel Canyon in Sylmar though San Fernando, Pacoima, Mission Hills, Panorama City, and Van Nuys.

== History ==
In 1911, the developers of the Van Nuys townsite altered the Pacoima Wash from Sherman Way to the Los Angeles River, for 3 miles (4.8 km) by adding a 50-foot-wide (15 m) street/flood channel.

The Pacoima Spreading Grounds were opened in 1933 by the Los Angeles County Flood Control District, providing a source of groundwater for the then agriculturally oriented area and controlling the natural flooding of the Pacoima Wash.

Years of flooding downstream followed, and Van Nuys flooded in the great Los Angeles Flood of 1938.

In the 1950s, many drastic efforts were made to protect residents along the Pacoima Wash.

Just after flowing below Interstate 5, the stream is diverted to the Pacoima Diversion Channel, joining Tujunga Wash further upstream. The Pacoima Wash Headworks were created where the Interstate 5 interchange is for settling of high flood volumes. The threat of flooding was diminished greatly. 41 years later, Congressman Tony Cardenas won funding to turn the headworks, bare ground used only to settle flood volumes, into parkland. The earlier attempts to channelize the wash from the Pacoima Headworks south were left alone, and the channel was redirected closer to Van Nuys Blvd.

Because of the flash floods in the Pacoima Wash, flooding in Van Nuys was an issue every year. In the great 1938 Los Angeles rains and flood, many parts of Van Nuys flooded severely.

Through the 1960s, Van Nuys Elementary School kept a pontoon bridge for students to cross the flood channel when it flooded. Parts of the original streambed disappeared and can be traced behind the YMCA. The Knights of Columbus is shoehorned in a 100-foot-wide (30 m) channel.

The flooding issues remained until the 1950s, when the Pacoima Diversion Channel took the stream east from Laurel Canyon and the I 5-CA 118 interchange to the Tujunga Wash. several miles of Pacoima Wash remained, drained by several miles of adjoining storm drains. And from Vanowen to the Los Angeles River, the historic Pacoima Wash disappears.

In 1991, the section between Lassen Street and Parthenia Street was one of the last sections of natural stream beds in the San Fernando Valley to be made a concrete channel.

In 2007, the wash was cleaned up after being cited as a fertile breeding ground for mosquitoes carrying the West Nile virus.

Pacoima Wash has been the site of several rescues of people, mostly of children and teenagers trapped in the spring runoff. Incidents occurred in 1985, 1993, 1995, 1996, 1998, and 2006.

There have been efforts to create a greenway along the Wash connecting the communities of the Northeast San Fernando Valley. In 2004 the Pacoima Wash Greenway Master Plan was created by Department of Landscape Architecture at Cal Poly Pomona which focuses on the portion of the Wash within the City of San Fernando. The Pacoima Wash Greenway had a grand opening on August 27, 2026.

In 2008, environmental non-profit Pacoima Beautiful started the Pacoima Wash initiative. The goal of this project is to create a linear greenway composed of bike lanes and a walking path along a 12-mile (19 km) stretch of the Wash between the Pacoima Dam in Sylmar and the Tujunga Wash in Arleta. The Pacoima Wash Vision Plan, which covers the Sylmar and Pacoima portions of the Wash was produced in 2011. An addendum to the plan focusing on the Arleta portion of the Wash is currently being produced.

Several new parks along the Wash are in various stages of completion. 8th Street Park is a 4.75-acre (1.92 ha) park in the City of San Fernando which will be completed in spring of 2014. The city of Los Angeles is creating preliminary designs for a park along the wash between El Dorado and Telfair Street.

== Crossings and tributaries ==
From mouth to source (year built in parentheses):

- Van Nuys Boulevard (1948)
- Saticoy Street (1933)
- Raymer Street
- Railroad: Union Pacific Railroad Coast Line
- Unnamed channel departs
- Roscoe Boulevard (1957)
- Chase Street [Pedestrian Bridge]
- Parthenia Street
- Rayen Street (1996)
- Nordhoff Street
- Tupper Street [Pedestrian Bridge]
- Plummer Street
- Lassen Street
- Parking lot
- Woodman Avenue
- Devonshire Street and Pacoima Spreading Grounds
- Arleta Avenue
- Pacoima Diversion Channel departs
- Interstate 5 Golden State Freeway and Paxton Street ramps (1963 and 1976)
- Laurel Canyon Boulevard (1954)
- State Route 118 Ronald Reagan Freeway (1969)
- San Jose Street/Haddon Avenue [Pedestrian Bridge]
- San Fernando Road (1925)
- Railroad: Metrolink Antelope Valley Line
- Bradley Avenue/4th Street (1954)
- 5th Street (1953)
- Glenoaks Boulevard (1953)
- Foothill Boulevard (1923)
- Interstate 210 Foothill Freeway (1975)
- Lopez Dam
- Harding Street
- Gavina Avenue
- Pacoima Trail Road and private roads
