= Nordhoff station =

Bus rapid transit station in Los Angeles, California

Nordhoff
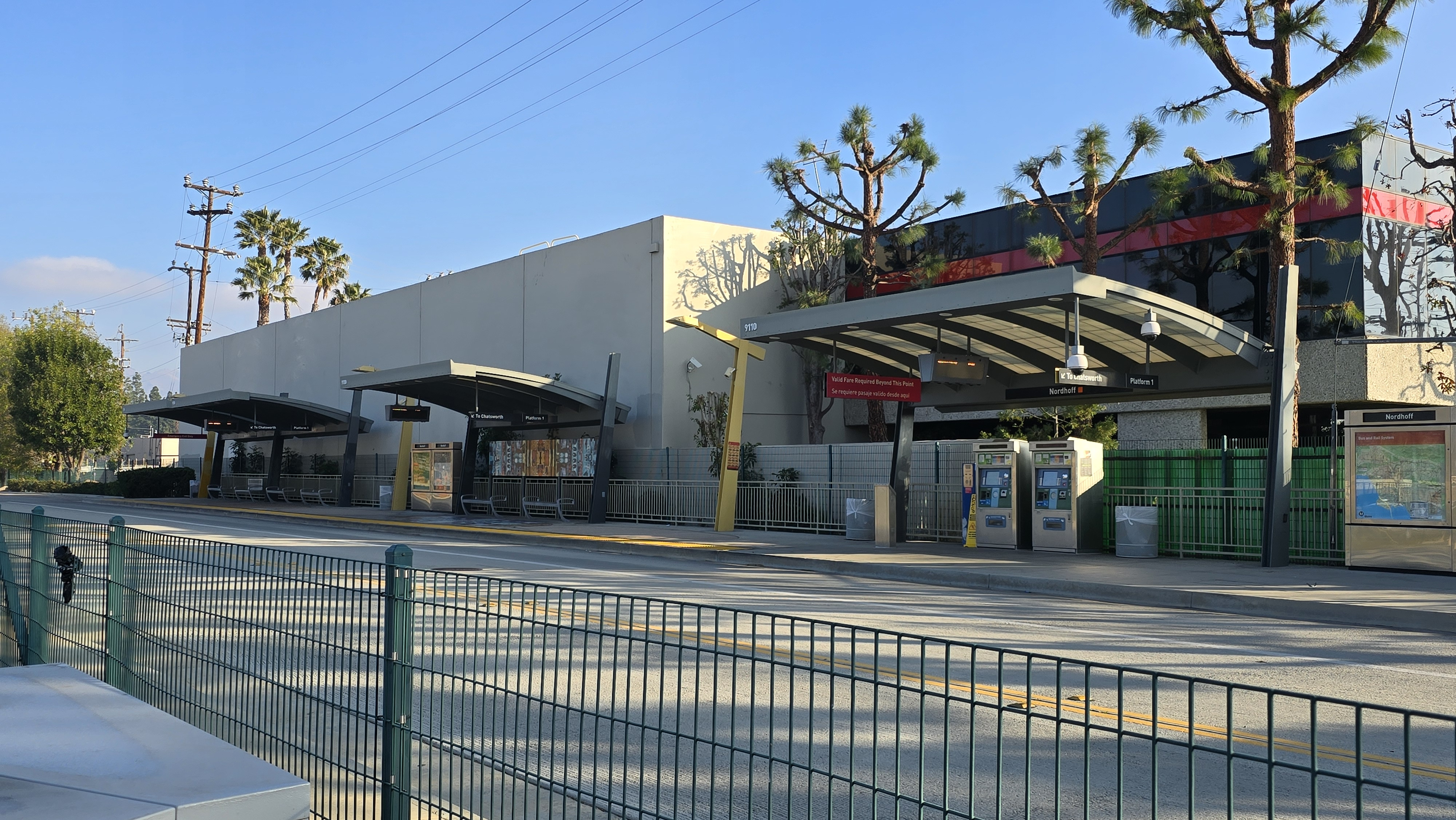
- Nordhoff station northbound platform, 2025

General information
- Location: 21385 Nordhoff Street; Los Angeles, California
- Coordinates: 34.23554°N 118.59696°W
- Owner: Los Angeles County Metropolitan Transportation Authority
- Platforms: 2 side platforms
- Connections: Los Angeles Metro Bus

Construction
- Cycle facilities: Racks and lockers
- Accessible: Yes

History
- Opened: June 30, 2012

Passengers
- FY 2026: 350 (avg. wkdy boardings)

Services
Preceding station	Metro Busway	Following station
Chatsworth Terminus	G Line	Roscoe toward North Hollywood
Location

Nordhoff Station is a station on the G Line of the Los Angeles Metro Busway system located in the Chatsworth neighborhood of Los Angeles in the western San Fernando Valley. The station opened in June 2012 and was built as part of the Metro Orange Line Chatsworth Extension.

Metro's Division 8 (West San Fernando Valley) bus depot is located directly west of the station. This is the assigned bus division where all Metro Orange Line vehicles are parked and where maintenance is done. A direct bus-only lane connection to the bus division was built as part of the Chatsworth Extension.

The G Line station is located at the intersection of Canoga Avenue and Nordhoff Street. The station's amenities include bicycle lockers and public art in the form of a 27-foot mosaic. A parking lot was not assigned for this station.

== Service ==
=== Hours and frequency ===
G Line buses run 24 hours a day. Buses operate every eight minutes during peak hours on weekdays. They operate every ten minutes during the daytime on weekdays and most of the day on weekends. Night service on all days is every 20 minutes.

=== Connections ===
As of January 19, 2025, the following connections are available:

- Los Angeles Metro Bus: 166
