= Bicycle transportation planning in Los Angeles =

Los Angeles can refer to both the City of Los Angeles and Los Angeles County, as well as the larger Los Angeles region (consisting of a continuous urban landscape stretching from Ventura County in the north down to Orange County in south).

There are a myriad of different agencies and authorities engaged in bicycle transportation planning, funding, design and construction in the Los Angeles area. This is an attempt to find the members of these agencies and authorities responsible for transportation projects and issues as they relate to bicycles.

== Entities in the City of Los Angeles ==
In the City of Los Angeles there are several city level departments which oversee transportation related issues. The individual sections and divisions responsible for bicycle matters are enumerated below. These are the people who work directly with bicycle projects:

=== Los Angeles Department of Transportation ===
Los Angeles Department of Transportation has a special portion of its Office of Transportation Development set aside for bicycle project planning, design, funding, and construction. Within the Office of Transportation Development, Bureau of Capital Programming (run by Haripal Var), is the Project Grants, Bikeways and Enhancement Division (headed by Michael Uyeno).

The Project Grants, Bikeways and Enhancement Division is further subdivided into a Bikeways Section and a position for a Senior Project Coordinator. During 2009 funding crisis Department head Rita Robinson proposed to eliminate Bikeways Division entirely and discontinue Safe Routes to School Work. (Inter Departmental Correspondence, 4 May 2009, addressed to Budget and Finance Committee, "Shared Responsibility and Sacrifice")

The LADOT has been granted the authority to issue vehicle and driver permits for pedicabs (a.k.a. bicycle taxis or rickshaws). The LADOT's forms, and the City's ordinances typically refer to pedicabs as "nonmotorized transportation". Permit applicants must submit the applications to the Franchise Regulation Division of the LADOT along with several fees.

==== Bikeways Section ====
- Bikeways Section (made up of a team of engineers) is headed by Paul Meshkin and Senior Bicycle Coordinator, Michelle Mowery.

==== Franchise Regulation Division ====
This division of the LADOT has been assigned to process pedicab vehicle and driver permits, though in 2007 a Central District Transportation Engineer (from the Office of Transportation Operations), "expressed concern that pedicabs could pose a road hazard, blocking traffic and frustrating drivers."

The Franchise Regulations Division licenses companies, tests and permits drivers, regulate and monitor the operations of companies and individuals authorized by the Board of Transportation Commissioners and the Board of Taxicab Commissioners to operate for-hire passenger vehicles within the City of Los Angeles. The Division inspects vehicles and enforces compliance with associated City ordinances and orders of the Board of Transportation Commissioners and the Board of Taxicab Commissioners and investigates complaints relating to taxicab, ambulance and other for-hire vehicles. It also administers the franchise of the gas distribution system and over 40 pipeline companies.

=== Los Angeles Planning Department ===
- Los Angeles Planning Department

=== Los Angeles Department of Public Works ===
The Los Angeles County Department of Public Work is responsible for the Los Angeles County Bicycle Master Plan. The plan was updated in 2012 and then again in winter of 2023. The Goal of the Bicycle Master Plan is to improve bicycle experience in Los Angeles County with priorities in safety, equity, mobility, and accountability. The department aims finalize the initiative in 2026.

==== Los Angeles Bureau of Street Services ====
Within the Los Angeles Bureau of Street Services Engineering Division is the Bikeways & Grants Management Section (LA):

===== Bikeways & Grants Management Section (LA) =====
The Bikeways & Grants Management Section (LA) prepares plans, specifications, and manages construction of bikeway projects in the City of Los Angeles. Bikeway projects recently constructed include the Los Angeles River Bike Path Phase 1-A and Phase 1-D, and the Culver Blvd. Median Bikeway. Upcoming projects include Los Angeles River Bikepath Phase 1-B and San Fernando Bikepath Phase I.

== Los Angeles County Metropolitan Transportation Authority ==
The Los Angeles County Metropolitan Transportation Authority (MTA) is a large, county-wide, authority. It affects cycling with its funding policies in two major ways.

First, the MTA spends money creating planning documents, surveys, etc. that allow the MTA itself or entities within Los Angeles County to apply for funds for bicycle projects. That is, the MTA gets paperwork ready for local entities to apply for money. The planning documents are produced in the Bikeway Planning (or Metro Bike Program) section of the MTA. Lynne Goldsmith runs the Metro Bike Program, and is part of the Transportation Development and Implementation (TDI) department.

Second, the MTA distributes funds for transportation projects. The MTA's policies prevent bicycle projects from being funded. Some big sources of general transportation funding that the MTA keeps from bicycle projects are: Proposition A and Proposition C Local Return sales tax dollars; and money available as part of the Transportation Improvement Program Call for Projects. This is a biennial process for allocating selected local, state, and federal transportation funds to cities (and other agencies) in Los Angeles County. The selection criteria for the CFP emphasise brick and mortar or innovative technologies. They exclude bicycle encouragement or education projects which are considered "marketing". Both of these sources of funding are doled out using the Transportation Development and Implementation unit.

=== Transportation Development and Implementation ===
The MTA's Bikeway Planning (or Metro Bike Program) is in the Transportation Development and Implementation (TDI) department of the MTA's Countywide Planning and Development Department. The Chief Planning Officer, currently Carol Inge, oversees the Countywide Planning and Development Department.

The Transportation Development and Implementation (TDI) department is responsible for project development, management, and/or implementation of multiple modes of transportation within Los Angeles County, including Highway/Freeway, Arterials, Transportation Demand Management (TDM), Rail and Busway, Signal Synchronization, Intelligent Transportation Systems, Bicycle, Pedestrian, Goods Movement and others.

In addition, this department approves and administers the utilization of Call for Projects (CFP) funds by the cities and county and provides assistance on joint development activities. This department also serves as the project planning lead in the Long Range Transit Plan (LRTP) and CFP. The department is organized into two geographic sub-regions with three area planning teams in each sub-region. One sub-region includes the Central, Gateway Cities/Southeast and San Gabriel Valley. The South Bay, San Fernando Valley/No County and Westside area planning teams are in the other sub-region. Each team is responsible for corridor planning, project management and implementation of multiple modes of transportation within its geographic area.

== See also ==
- Bicycle transportation planning in the San Francisco Bay Area
