= Nordhoff Street =

Arterial road in Los Angeles's San Fernando Valley

- Namesake: Charles Nordhoff
- Maintained by: Bureau of Street Services, Los Angeles Department of Water and Power
- Length: 10 mi (16 km)
- Nearest metro station: Nordhoff
- West end: Chatsworth Nature Preserve
- Major junctions: SR 27; I-405
- East end: Osbourne Street in Arleta

Nordhoff Street is a major east–west arterial road that runs for 10 miles (16 km) in the northwest San Fernando Valley in Los Angeles, California.

== Name ==
Nordhoff Street was named after Charles Nordhoff, a 19th-century a journalist whose writings about California attracted many transplants.

== Route ==
Nordhoff Street travels east–west across the northern San Fernando Valley. From west to east, it travels through Chatsworth, Northridge, North Hills, and Panorama City, and into Arleta. Nordhoff also marks the northern boundary separating Northridge from Sherwood Forest. The street is four lanes or more for almost its entire length, and it contains a gap at Corbin Avenue, although the gap is bridged by Nordhoff Way.

== Transit ==
Metro Local Line 166 runs along Nordhoff Street and the G Line's Nordhoff station is located at Nordhoff and Canoga Avenue in Chatsworth.

The East San Fernando Valley Light Rail Transit Project plans to have a stop at Nordhoff and Van Nuys Boulevard in Panorama City.

Nordhoff is a major contributor to the North San Fernando Valley Transit Corridor. In 2019, Bus Rapid Transit was proposed on Nordhoff as part of this corridor, but it was blocked by local residents.

== Notable landmarks ==
Notable landmarks on Nordhoff include (from west to east): Chatsworth Nature Preserve, Northridge Fashion Center, Rancho Del Norte, and Dearborn Park. Northridge Branch Library and Mid-Valley Regional Library are also located on Nordhoff.

Schools on Nordhoff include (from west to east): California State University, Northridge, Dearborn Elementary Charter Academy, James Monroe High School, Valor Academy Middle School, and Primary Academy-Success School.
