= 2019 Los Angeles special elections =

- June 4, 2019; August 13, 2019

1 out of 15 seats in the City Council 8 seats needed for a majority
	Majority party	Minority party
Party	Democratic	Republican
Seats before	14	1
Seats won	0	1
Seats after	14	1
Seat change	Steady	Steady
- March 5, 2019; May 14, 2019

1 out of 7 seats in the LAUSD Board of Education 4 seats needed for a majority
	Majority party	Minority party
Party	Democratic	Republican
Seats before	5	1
Seats won	1	0
Seats after	6	1
Seat change	▲1	Steady

The 2019 Los Angeles special elections were held on March 5, 2019, and June 4, 2019. Voters elected candidates in a nonpartisan primary, with runoff elections scheduled for May 14, 2019 and August 13, 2019. One of the fifteen seats in the City Council were up for election while one of the seven seats in the Board of Education were up for election.

Two seats were up for election due to the vacancy of two members, councilman Mitchell Englander of District 12 and Ref Rodriguez of Board District 5, who both resigned in the wake of felony charges against them. The Board District 5 did not have an appointed representative unlike Council District 12, who had previous councilmember Greig Smith installed to finish the term.

Municipal elections in California are officially nonpartisan; candidates' party affiliations do not appear on the ballot.

== City Council ==
2019 Los Angeles City Council District 12 election special
- August 13, 2019
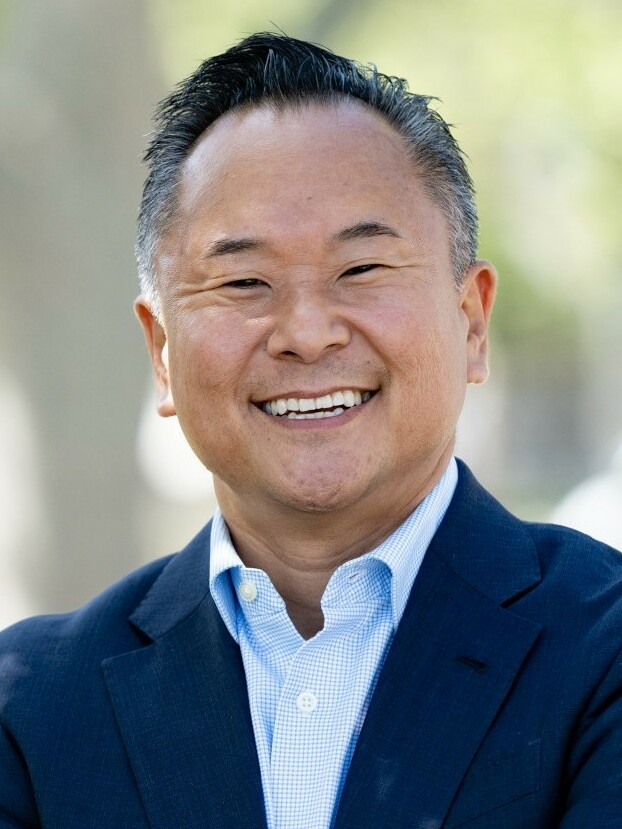

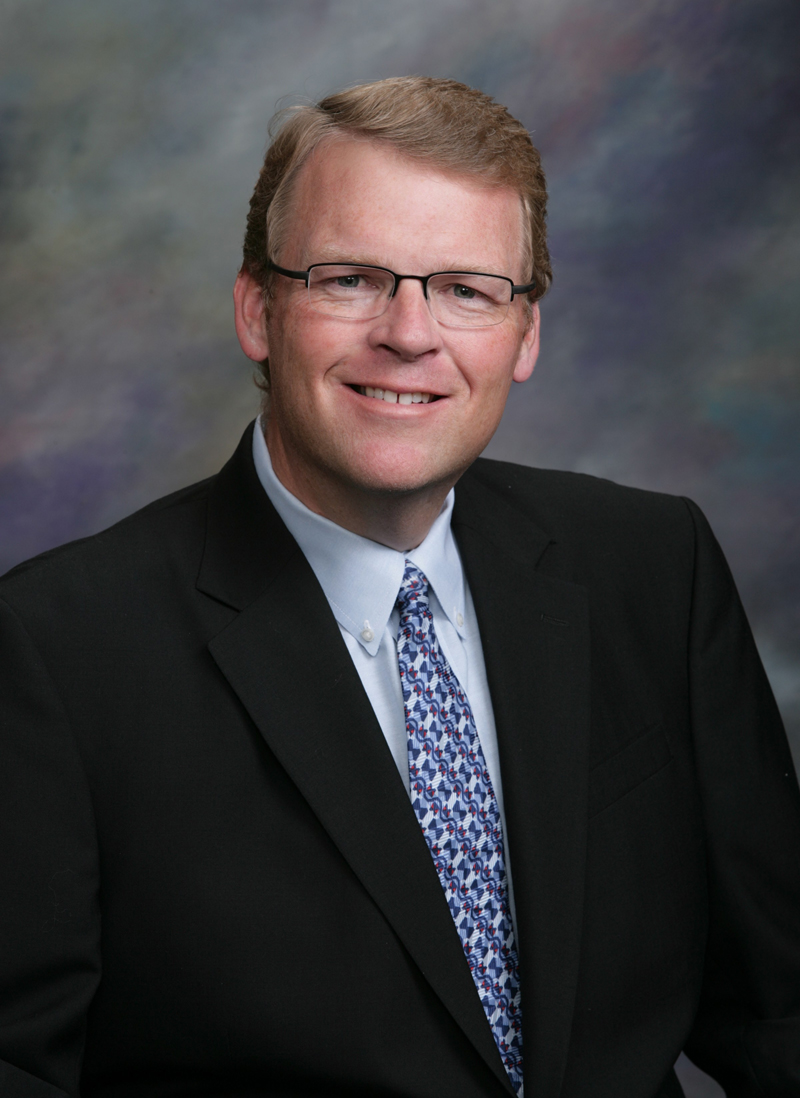
Candidate	John Lee	Loraine Lundquist	Scott Abrams
First round	8,197; 18.74%	8,635; 19.74	5,300; 12.12%
Runoff	19,426; 51.55%	18,259; 48.45%	Eliminated
Candidate	Jay Beeber	Frank Ferry	Charles Sean Dinse
First round	4,169; 9.53%	3,791; 8.67%	3,149; 7.20%
Runoff	Eliminated	Eliminated	Eliminated
City Councilor before election
Greig Smith
City Councilor
John Lee

=== District 12 ===
==== Candidates ====
- John Lee, chief of staff of vacated councilmember Mitchell Englander
- Loraine Lundquist, educator and scientist
- Scott Abrams, director of constituent service offices for Congressman Brad Sherman
- Carlos Amador, human rights and civil rights advocate
- Jay Beeber, executive director of Safer Streets L.A.
- Annie Cho, entrepreneur
- Jeffery Daar, attorney
- Frank Ferry, former mayor of Santa Clarita
- Jack Kayajian, administrator for the office of City Attorney Mike Feuer
- Stella T. Maloyan, executive at Los Angeles Alliance for a New Economy
- Raji Rab, pilot and flight instructor
- Brandon Saario, actor
- Navraj Singh, small business owner
- Joshua Michael Yeager, Chatsworth Neighborhood Council member

==== Did not make ballot ====
- Jason Aula
- David F. Balen
- Michael Benedetto, President of the Granada Hills South Neighborhood Council
- Pamela Bolin, Northridge West Neighborhood Council member
- Daniel Garcia, principal at Praetorian Resource
- Jose Luis Gonzalez, recreation facility director
- Hugh Schurtz, consultant and spokesperson
- Daniel Tsurif, vice president of Artist Management & Digital Strategy at BRXND
- Serena Oberstein, former L.A. Ethics Commissioner

==== Withdrew ====
- Charles Sean Dinse, police senior lead
- Brandii Grace, game designer and educator

==== Results ====
2019 Los Angeles City Council District 12 special election
Primary election
Candidate	Votes	%
Loraine Lundquist	8,635	19.74
John Lee	8,197	18.74
Scott Abrams	5,300	12.12
Jay Beeber	4,169	9.53
Frank Ferry	3,791	8.67
Charles Sean Dinse	3,149	7.20
Jeff Darr	1,668	3.81
Stella Maloyan	1,532	3.50
Carlos Amador	1,411	3.23
Brandon Saario	1,406	3.21
Jack Kayajian	1,233	2.82
Navraj Singh	987	2.26
Annie Eunwoo Cho	864	1.98
John Yeager	734	1.68
Raji Rab	669	1.53
Total votes	43,745	100.00
General election
John Lee	19,426	51.55
Loraine Lundquist	18,259	48.45
Total votes	37,772	100.00

== LAUSD Board of Education ==
=== District 5 ===
==== Candidates ====
- Jackie Goldberg, former Assemblymember for the 45th district, Councilmember for District 13, and board member for District 3
- Heather Repenning, director of external affairs for Mayor Eric Garcetti
- Allison Bajracharya, former operations and strategy chief at the Camino Nuevo Charter Academy
- Ana Cubas, professor at East Los Angeles College and founder and president of Latina Public Service Academy
- Cynthia Gonzalez, principal at Diego Rivera Learning Complex
- Graciela Ortiz, Huntington Park councilwoman and social worker
- Rocio Rivas, community representative
- Salvador "Chamba" Sanchez, professor at Los Angeles City College, community activist and former janitor union organizer
- David Valdez, Los Angeles County arts commissioner
- Nestor Enrique Valencia, City of Bell councilmember

==== Did not make ballot ====
- Laura Garza, politician and garment worker

==== Withdrew ====
- Erika Alvarez, teacher
- Eduardo Cisneros, director of National Census Program and former field director for former Board member Yolie Flores
- Scott Cody, teacher, Instructional Support Specialist, and adjunct professor at USC Rossier School of Education
- Bennett Kayser, former Board member
- Fidencio Joel Gallardo, City of Bell councilmember
- James O'Gabhann III, teacher
- Justine Gonzalez, president of the City of Los Angeles Human Relations Commission

==== Results ====
2019 LAUSD District 5 special election
Primary election
Candidate	Votes	%
Jackie Goldberg	15,935	48.18
Heather Repenning	4,341	13.13
Graciela Ortiz	4,310	13.03
Allison Bajracharya	1,986	6.00
Ana Cubas	1,145	3.46
David Valdez	678	2.05
Rocio Rivas	545	1.65
Salvador "Chamba" Sanchez	522	1.58
Nestor Enrique Valencia	382	1.15
Total votes	29,844	100.00
Jackie Goldberg	20,552	71.35
Heather Repenning	8,253	28.65
Total votes	28,952	100.00
