= 2013 Los Angeles City Attorney election =

Local election in California

- May 21, 2013
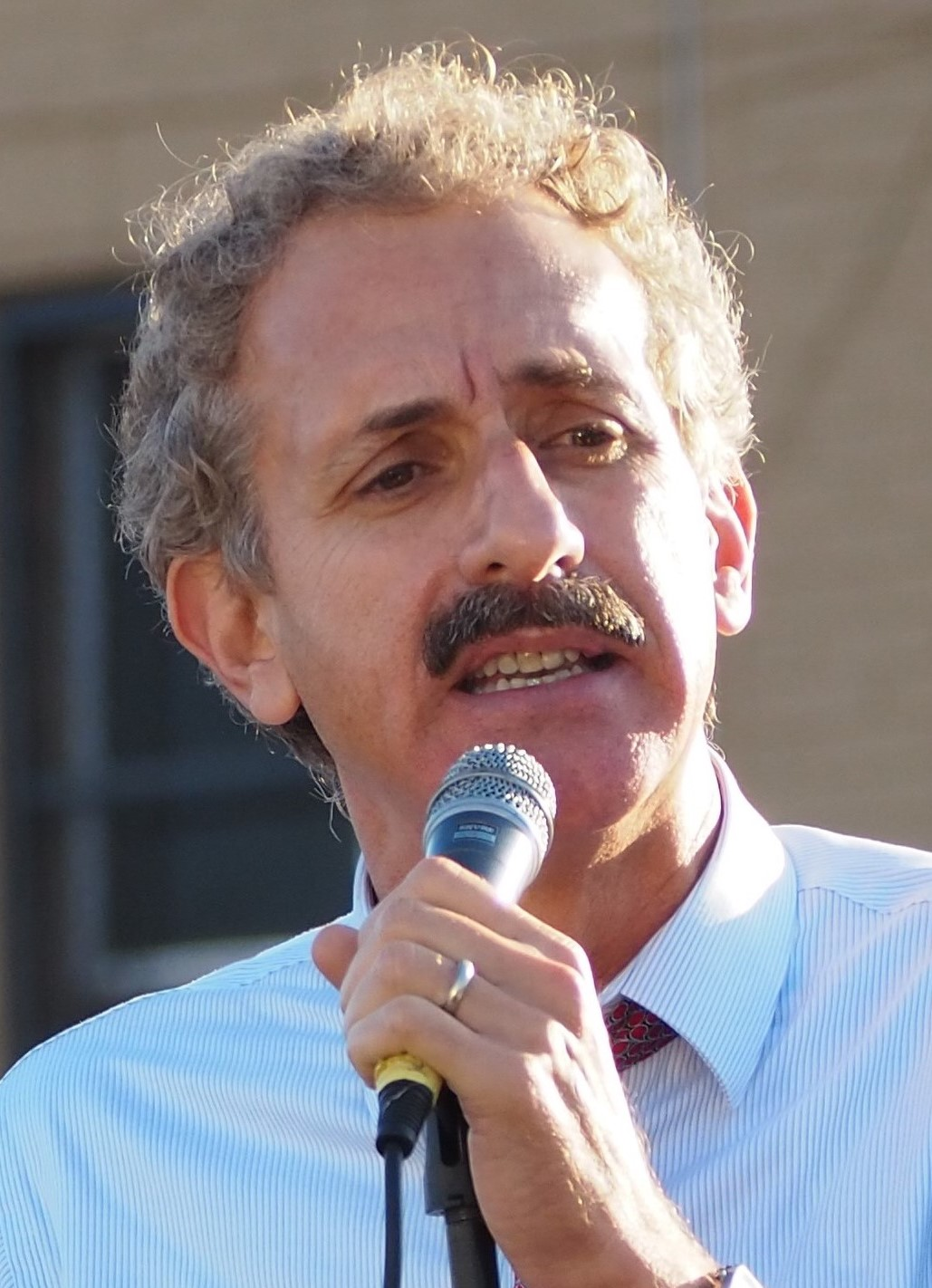

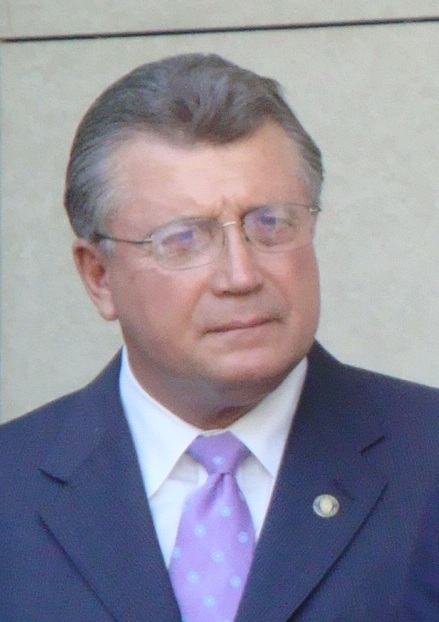

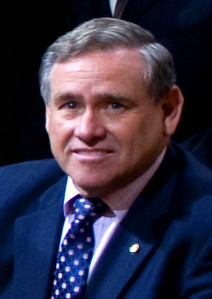
Candidate	Mike Feuer	Carmen Trutanich	Greig Smith
Party	Nonpartisan	Nonpartisan	Nonpartisan
First round	116,883; 43.76%	80,587; 30.17%	46,578; 17.44%
Runoff	238,237; 62.27%	144,334; 37.73%	Eliminated
City Attorney before election
Carmen Trutanich
Democratic
City Attorney
Mike Feuer

The 2013 Los Angeles City Attorney election begun on March 5, 2013 with a nonpartisan top-two primary. As no candidate received a majority of the vote, the top two candidates, Mike Feuer and incumbent Carmen Trutanich, advanced to a runoff election held on May 21, which Feuer won in a landslide victory.

== Nonpartisan primary ==
=== Candidates ===
==== Advanced to runoff ====
- Mike Feuer, state assemblyman from the 42nd district (2006-2012)
- Carmen Trutanich, incumbent mayor

==== Eliminated in primary ====
- Greig Smith, Los Angeles city councilman from the 12th district (2003–2011; 2019)
- Noel Weiss, attorney and policy advocate

=== Endorsements ===
Carmen Trutanich

Local officials

- ~~Lee Baca, sheriff of Los Angeles County (1998–2014)~~ (rescinded, later endorsed Feuer)
Mike Feuer

State legislators

- John Pérez, former Speaker of the California State Assembly (2010–2014) from the 46th district (2008–2012) and 53rd district (2012–2014)

Local officials

- Jackie Lacey, district attorney of Los Angeles County (2012–2020)
- Lee Baca, sheriff of Los Angeles County (1998–2014)
- Zev Yaroslavsky, supervisor of Los Angeles County (1994–2014)

Party officials

- Eric Bauman, chair of the Los Angeles Democratic Party (2000–2017) and vice chair of the California Democratic Party (2009–2017)

Labor unions

- Los Angeles County Federation of Labor

Newspapers

- Los Angeles Daily News
- Los Angeles Times

=== Results ===
2013 Los Angeles City Attorney election
Primary election
Candidate	Votes	%
Mike Feuer	151,488	44.10%
Carmen Trutanich (incumbent)	102,050	29.70%
Greig Smith	60,253	17.54%
Noel Weiss	29,078	8.64%
Total votes	343,499	100.00%

== Runoff ==
=== Results ===
2013 Los Angeles City Attorney runoff election
Candidate	Votes	%
Mike Feuer	238,237	62.27%
Carmen Trutanich (incumbent)	144,334	37.73%
Total votes	382,571	100.00%
