= 2015 Los Angeles elections =

- March 3, 2015; May 19, 2015

8 out of 15 seats in the City Council 8 seats needed for a majority
	Majority party	Minority party
Party	Democratic	Republican
Seats before	14	1
Seats won	6	1
Seats after	14	1
Seat change	Steady	Steady

The 2015 Los Angeles elections were held on March 3, 2015, in Los Angeles, California. Voters elected candidates in a nonpartisan primary, with runoff elections scheduled for May 19, 2015. Seven of the fifteen seats in the City Council were up for election.

Municipal elections in California are officially nonpartisan; candidates' party affiliations do not appear on the ballot.

== City Council ==
=== District 2 ===
2015 Los Angeles City Council District 2 election
Primary election
Candidate	Votes	%
Paul Krekorian (incumbent)	8,312	75.43
Eric Preven	2,708	24.57
Total votes	11,020	100.00

=== District 4 ===
2015 Los Angeles City Council District 4 election
Primary election
Candidate	Votes	%
Carolyn Ramsay	3,719	15.26
David Ryu	3,634	14.91
Tomas O'Grady	3,427	14.06
Wally Knox	2,669	10.95
Teddy Davis	2,631	10.79
Steve Veres	2,332	9.57
Sheila Irani	1,990	8.16
Joan Pelico	1,418	5.82
Jay Beeber	1,164	4.78
Ross Sarkissian	530	2.17
Tara Bannister	309	1.27
Mike Schaefer	268	1.10
Fred Mariscal	182	0.75
Step Jones	105	0.43
Total votes	24,378	100.00
General election
David Ryu	13,161	54.83
Carolyn Ramsay	10,844	45.17
Total votes	24,005	100.00

=== District 6 ===
2015 Los Angeles City Council District 6 election
Primary election
Candidate	Votes	%
Nury Martinez (incumbent)	6,625	61.13
Cindy Montañez	4,212	38.87
Total votes	10,837	100.00

=== District 8 ===
2015 Los Angeles City Council District 8 election
Primary election
Candidate	Votes	%
Marqueece Harris-Dawson	7,631	62.18
Robert Cole	1,735	14.14
Forescee Hogan-Rowles	1,574	12.83
Bobbie Jean Anderson	1,333	10.86
Total votes	12,273	100.00

=== District 10 ===
2015 Los Angeles City Council District 10 election
Primary election
Candidate	Votes	%
Herb Wesson (incumbent)	8,889	63.28
Grace Yoo	4,174	29.71
Delaney Smith	985	7.01
Total votes	14,048	100.00

=== District 12 ===
2015 Los Angeles City Council District 12 election
Primary election
Candidate	Votes	%
Mitchell Englander (incumbent)	13,836	100.00
Total votes	13,836	100.00

=== District 14 ===
2015 Los Angeles City Council District 14 election
Primary election
Candidate	Votes	%
José Huizar (incumbent)	13,704	65.34
Gloria Molina	5,099	24.31
Nadine Momoyo Diaz	913	4.35
Mario Chavez	774	3.69
John O'Neill	483	2.30
Total votes	20,973	100.00
