= 1969 Los Angeles mayoral election =

- April 1, 1969 and May 27, 1969

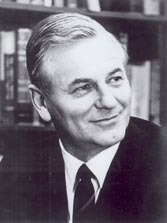
Candidate	Sam Yorty	Tom Bradley
First round	183,334; 26.09%	293,753; 41.80%
Runoff	447,030; 53.26%	392,379; 46.74%
Candidate	Baxter Ward	Alphonzo E. Bell Jr.
First round	116,555; 16.59%	99,172; 14.11%
Runoff	Eliminated	Eliminated
Mayor before election
Sam Yorty
Elected Mayor
Sam Yorty

The 1969 Los Angeles mayoral election took place on April 1, 1969, with a run-off election on May 27, 1969. Incumbent Sam Yorty was re-elected over councilmember Tom Bradley, a win that had a record-breaking turnout. Yorty used race against Bradley to paint him as a mayor who would be open to Black nationalism and that he was inefficient against fighting crime. Both were denied by Bradley, as he was a police officer in the Los Angeles Police Department before his election to the council.

Municipal elections in California, including Mayor of Los Angeles, are officially nonpartisan; candidates' party affiliations do not appear on the ballot.

== Candidates ==
- Eileen Anderson
- Alphonzo E. Bell Jr., U.S. representative from the Westside
- Tom Bradley, member of the Los Angeles City Council from Leimert Park
- Saxon Cameron Elliott
- Don Frederick
- William E. Hathaway
- Fred W. Kline
- Jack Rourke
- Lawrence M. Schulner
- Robert K. Steinberg
- Baxter Ward, television news anchor for KABC-Channel 7
- Arthur Whizin
- Robert M. Wilkinson, member of the Los Angeles City Council from Porter Ranch
- Sam Yorty, incumbent mayor since 1961

== Campaign ==
Yorty had been criticized by newspapers, mainly with the Los Angeles Times which had published a newspaper on the city's harbor commission and his refusal to endorse Democratic presidential candidate Hubert Humphrey. He was mainly challenged in the race by councilman Tom Bradley, television news anchor Baxter Ward, U.S. Representative Alphonzo E. Bell Jr., and councilman Robert M. Wilkinson. In the primary election, Bradley held a substantial lead over Yorty but did not win the race outright.

In the campaign for the runoff, Yorty questioned Bradley's credibility in fighting crime and said that he would supposedly open up the city to Black Nationalists, as well as saying that he accepted money from developer Bryan Gibson. To the surprise of many pollsters, Yorty won a majority of the vote and was re-elected as mayor. The election had a record breaking turnout of more than 75% with more than 860,000 votes; the vote count would not be broken until the 2022 election. Bradley and Yorty spent a combinded total of $2 million in their election campaigns, with Yorty spending $817,450 and Bradley spending $1.4 million.

== Results ==
=== Primary election ===
Los Angeles mayoral primary election, April 1, 1969
Candidate	Votes	%
Tom Bradley	293,753	41.80
Sam Yorty (incumbent)	183,334	26.09
Baxter Ward	116,555	16.59
Alphonzo E. Bell Jr.	99,172	14.11
Robert M. Wilkinson	2,682	0.38
Eileen Anderson	1,600	0.23
Robert K. Steinberg	1,574	0.22
Saxon Cameron Elliott	1,160	0.17
Jack Rourke	760	0.11
Fred W. Kline	718	0.10
Arthur Whizin	659	0.09
William E. Hathaway	375	0.05
Don Federick	277	0.04
Lawrence M. Schulner	169	0.02
Total votes	702,788	100.00

=== General election ===
Los Angeles mayoral general election, May 27, 1969
Candidate	Votes	%
Sam Yorty (incumbent)	447,030	53.26
Tom Bradley	392,379	46.74
Total votes	839,409	100.00
