= Renaissance Summit =

Gated community in Los Angeles, California

Coordinates: 34.2967°N 118.5739°W

Renaissance Summit (also known simply as Renaissance or Renaissance at Porter Ranch) is a gated housing subdivision in the northwest San Fernando Valley of the city of Los Angeles, at the highest point in the Porter Ranch neighborhood. Its building and opening was championed by major local political figures in the 1980s and 1990s but was also an ongoing source of controversy in the area.

== Opening ==
The development opened in August 1999. The building of Renaissance Summit and the surrounding areas was mired in controversy and Los Angeles politics in the late 1980s and early 1990s. Existing residents of the Porter Ranch area feared the increased traffic that would be brought by the planned building of an area commercial complex to service the new homes being built. The community had also been criticized for destroying the natural beauty of the brush and wild areas that inhabited the space before the houses were built.

The ceremony for the opening of the subdivision was unusually packed with Los Angeles political elite, including Mayor Richard Riordan, City Council President John Ferraro, City Councilman Hal Bernson, and Police Chief Bernard Parks.

It was built by Shapell Homes, a company founded by Nathan Shapell, an Auschwitz survivor, philanthropist, and major Los Angeles builder .

== Homes and administration ==
Renaissance Summit has been described as a "bastion of luxury" located on the slopes of the Santa Susana Mountains. It offers a high viewpoint looking down on other neighborhoods of the San Fernando Valley, including Reseda, Canoga Park, and Sherman Oaks.

Houses average 4,000 square feet. Design styles include Spanish Colonial, classic Italianate, Tuscan, coastal, and American traditional.

The development's security is strict, with visitors unable to enter through the community gate unless their names are on a guest list.

In 2006, the development's homeowner association and property management firm, Ross Morgan & Company, drew attention when they demanded that a homeowner remove a flagpole from her property on which an American flag was hoisted.

== See also ==
- Porter Ranch
- Santa Susana Mountains
