= Robert M. Wilkinson =

American politician

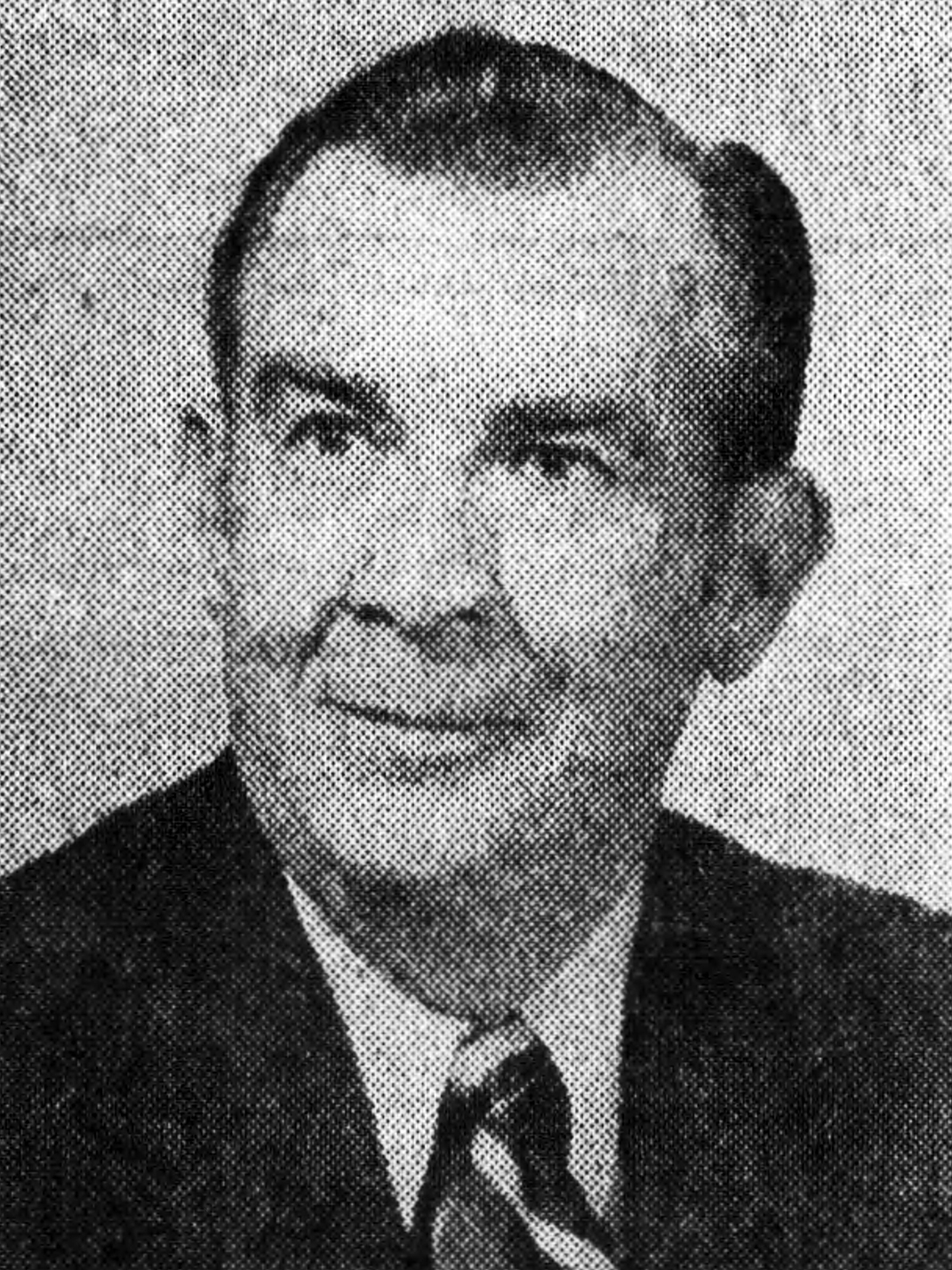
- Wilkinson in 1975

Member of the Los Angeles City Council
- In office July 1, 1953 – June 30, 1957
- Preceded by: J. Win Austin
- Succeeded by: Patrick D. McGee
- Constituency: 3rd district
- In office July 1, 1967 – June 30, 1979
- Preceded by: John P. Cassidy
- Succeeded by: Hal Bernson
- Constituency: 12th district

Personal details
- Born: Robert Melvin Wilkinson; April 11, 1921 Ansley, Nebraska
- Died: September 27, 2010 (aged 89) Northridge, California
- Party: Republican

Robert Melvin Wilkinson (April 11, 1921 – September 27, 2010) was a political figure and lobbyist in the San Fernando Valley in California. He was a member of the Los Angeles City Council from 1953 to 1957 and from 1967 to 1979.

== Biography ==
Wilkinson was born in Ansley, Nebraska, to David and Kathryn Wilkinson. The family moved to the San Fernando Valley in 1936, where Robert attended Canoga Park High School. After serving in the Navy, he earned a bachelor's degree in engineering from the University of Southern California in 1947. He was a licensed real estate broker. He was later a sales-promotion manager for a showcase-manufacturing firm in Los Angeles. Wilkinson was married about 1944 to Marjorie Merta Philp of Grover, Colorado. They had a son, Robert Wilkinson, Jr.; and two daughters, Barbara Lima and Noreen Hodapp. Marjorie Wilkinson died in 1990.

He died in Northridge, California, after surgery necessitated by a broken arm and hip suffered in a fall. Services were in First Lutheran Church, Northridge. He was survived by his wife, Rosetta Kurmann-Wilkinson, son Robert M. Jr. and daughters Noreen Hodapp and Barbara Lima.

== Public service ==
=== City Council ===
==== Elections ====
Wilkinson was elected in 1953 at the age of 32 to a four-year term to represent Los Angeles City Council District 3. At that time, the 3rd District included UCLA and contiguous territory, some of the Santa Monica Mountains and a portion of the San Fernando Valley, including Tarzana and Woodland Hills. He did not run for reelection in 1957, because, he said, he was starting to get ulcers.

Ten years later, 1967, Wilkinson took on incumbent John P. Cassidy in Los Angeles City Council District 12, which had been shifted by the City Council in a 1964 decision from Downtown to the northwestern Valley. Wilkinson beat Cassidy in the new geography by a lopsided 14,485-to-4,167 vote. He was easily reelected in the 1971 primary, but in 1975 his victory was narrower—20,391 for Wilkinson in the final and 20,068 for challenger Barbara Klein. He did not run for reelection in 1979.

==== Highlights ====
Wilkinson was known as a hard-line conservative who could be loud at times. Some of the highlights of his Council service:

Trout. Trout-fishing trips that he organized for Valley politicians to Mammoth Lakes aroused controversy when it was found that the groups received free use of cabins owned by the city's independent Los Angeles Department of Water and Power. The fishermen then began paying for their lodgings.

Hutchinson. Wilkinson successfully opposed a 1968 attempt by Mayor Sam Yorty to appoint Roger S. Hutchinson to the Library Commission after the councilman cited a series of Los Angeles Times articles that linked Hutchinson to conflicts of interest that occurred when he sat on the city's Board of Zoning Adjustment. Hutchinson later withdrew his name.

Vietnam. In 1970, he submitted a resolution, approved unanimously by the council, condemning "in the strongest terms the repressive, cruel and uncivilized treatment" of American and allied prisoners by the North Vietnamese during the Vietnam War.

Century Plaza. As chairman of a Council committee investigating a 1968 protest against a speech by President Lyndon B. Johnson, which turned into the Century Plaza riot, Wilkinson said that "some undue force" was used by the officers but that "If some of the good citizens were handled rather roughly in the ensuing melee, probably they should blame the parade leaders rather than the police." He said his committee would begin discussion of a new parade ordinance.

Voting, He opposed a 1969 proposal to lower the voting age from 21 to 19 because he feared a leftist trend in younger voters and didn't "buy the argument that if they are old enough to fight in Vietnam they are old enough to vote."

Pro tem. Wilkinson was elected president pro tem of the council in 1973.

=== Other ===
After his first stint on the council, he was the executive secretary of the city's Harbor Commission for nearly nine years until, he said, he was ousted by Mayor Sam Yorty. He sued four former Harbor commissioners, claiming they forced him out of the department in 1965 because he interfered with their "Illegal and unethical practices for their personal profit." The defendants included former City Council member Karl L. Rundberg, who was facing jail after being convicted of bribery at the Harbor.

Wilkinson was later on the board of the 51st District Agricultural Association, sponsor of the San Fernando Valley Fair.

He was also a candidate for mayor in the 1969 election, challenging Mayor Yorty without risking his council seat. He finished fifth of fourteen in the April primary election with 2,682 of the 702,788 votes cast.

== Lobbying ==
When he left the council, he "created a furor" when he decided to keep for his personal use $44,932.48 in unspent campaign funds.

Wilkinson became a top-paid registered lobbyist, earning nearly half a million dollars from the Porter Ranch Company alone. He was officially a real estate broker and investment counselor. He said his links with City Hall were not important. "I'm just a country boy, doing my thing," he said. "I don't drive a Mercedes-Benz. Nor a Jaguar. I'm a station-wagon person."

One of his clients was pop star Michael Jackson, who sought zoning variances for his Encino district estate on Hayvenhurst Avenue that would have allowed him to add a giraffe to his backyard zoo. Jackson wanted to maintain a seventeen-foot-high fence instead of the legally allowed six feet. He withdrew his request after neighbors objected.

Another client was the Islamic Center of Northridge, which needed planning and zoning permission to build the Valley's first mosque, in Granada Hills.

== Quotations ==
- Mandatory jail sentences and the death penalty should be invoked for drug pushers because their crimes are "worse than murder."
- "I am not a women's libber. My wife isn't either. . . . She is really not for opening the door for me. She likes her femininity and having a husband who is the head of the household. She does have a lot to say, though, and she keeps the bank account."
- "I think Watergate has been sensationalized."
- "I don't have a good feeling toward [French President Charles] De Gaulle, especially what he did to the United States and favoring Communist nations" (opposing a motion to lower city flags in observance of De Gaulle's death).
- "I don't scream very much. I just tell them the facts."

== Legacies ==
A senior center is named for him in Northridge.

Political offices
Preceded by Earle D. Baker	Los Angeles City Council; 3rd District; 1953–1957	Succeeded by Patrick D. McGee
Preceded by John P. Cassidy	12th District; 1967–1979	Succeeded by Hal Bernson
