= John P. Cassidy =

American politician

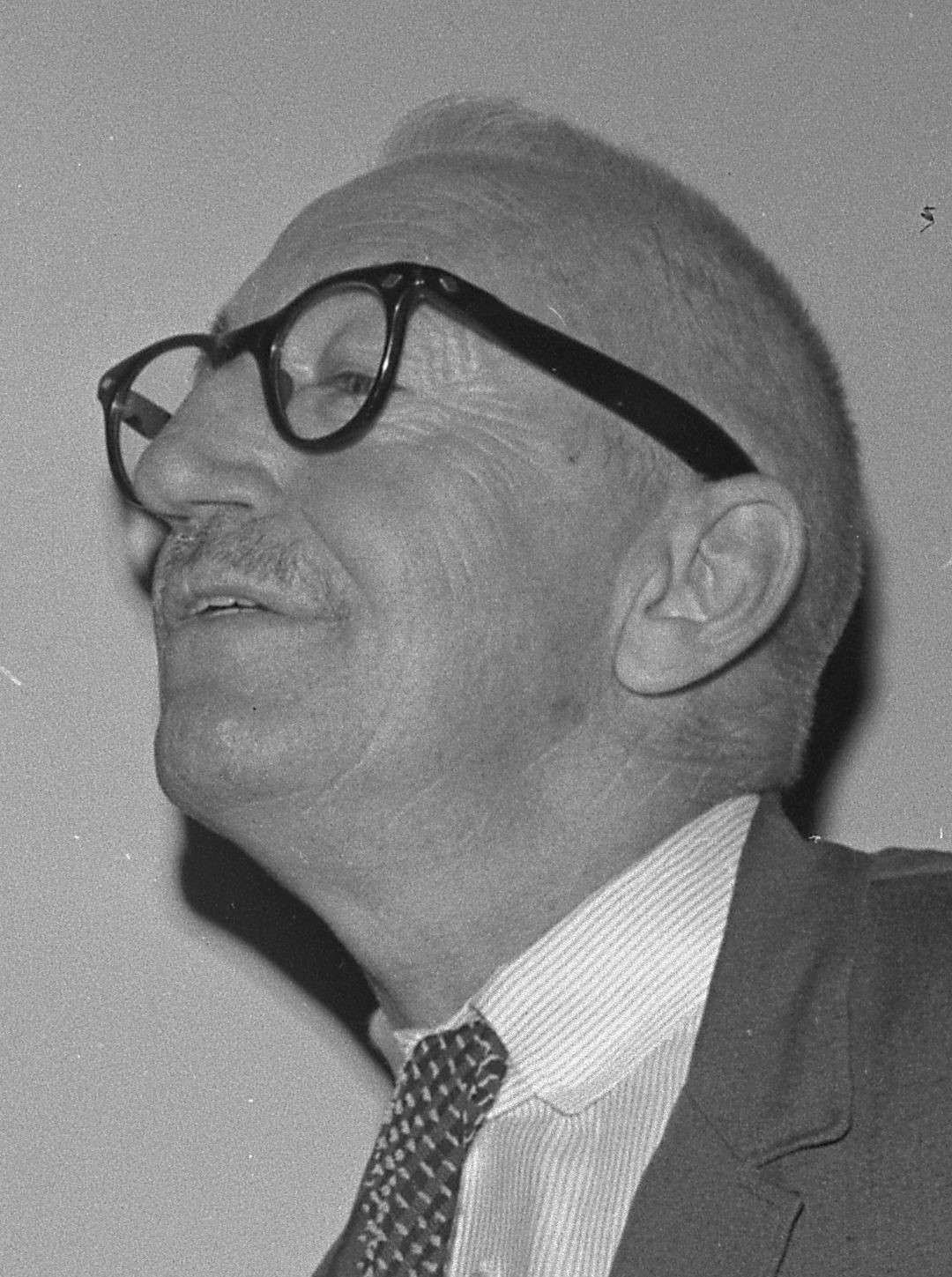
- Cassidy in 1964

Member of the Los Angeles City Council from the 12th district
- In office December 7, 1962 – June 30, 1967
- Preceded by: Ransom M. Callicott
- Succeeded by: Robert M. Wilkinson

Personal details
- Born: May 10, 1903 Boise, Idaho
- Died: September 24, 1989 (aged 86) Los Angeles, California
- Party: Republican
- Occupation: Politician

John Patrick Cassidy (May 10, 1903 – September 24, 1989) was a newspaperman and public relations practitioner who became a Los Angeles City Council member in District 12 between 1962 and 1967. Before and after his term he was a field deputy to two City Council members, and in 1967 he was briefly the head of public relations for the city's Recreation and Parks Department.

== Biography ==
Born May 10, 1903 in Boise, Idaho, Cassidy was the son of Henry Francis Cassidy and Mae Zelette Cassidy. The elder Cassidy was the founder and publisher of The Evening Journal, a newspaper begun in 1908 in Santa Monica, California. Zelette continued as publisher after the death of her husband until the outbreak of World War I. The couple had four children—Henry, Helen, Margaret and John Patrick. Cassidy attended St. Joseph's Academy in Berkeley, California, Los Angeles High School, St. Mary's College, UCLA and USC.

He was a merchant sailor for three years, and during World War II he was in the U.S. Navy. As a journalist, he worked on the Los Angeles Record, Los Angeles Daily News, Los Angeles Examiner, the Associated Press, United Press and International News Service. He directed his own public relations office for 14 years and conducted political campaigns on national, state and local levels over a period of 27 years.

Cassidy was the father of three children—Patricia Colleen (Balyeat), Sue and John Jr. He was later divorced.

== City Council ==
=== Appointment and elections ===
Cassidy was a friend of City Councilman Ransom M. Callicott and served five years as the councilman's field deputy; Callicott had been elected in 1955 to represent the Los Angeles City Council District 12 but died in 1963, with Cassidy appointed at the age of 59 by unanimous vote of the City Council on December 7, 1962, to succeed him until the April 2, 1963, primary election. The Los Angeles Times reported:

Cassidy had been Callicott's personal choice as a successor. . . . Callicott, who died last month, asked Cassidy to move from West Los Angeles into the 12th district two years ago. The late councilman was in poor health and was understood to be grooming Cassidy for the $12,000-a-year job.

Cassidy faced the downtown voters in April 1963 and was elected to a four-year term. In the meantime, though, a move was afoot to shift the 12th District City Council seat into the San Fernando Valley, which had experienced steady population growth over the years, and in July 1964 the councilman agreed to the arrangement and said he would relocate into his new district area.

In 1967 he ran for reelection in his new area but was ousted in the final balloting by Robert M. Wilkinson, who garnered a vote of 24,312 to Cassidy's 7,127. It was "a bitter campaign marked by frequent exchanges of 'smear' charges."

=== Positions ===
- Cassidy generally supported the policies of Mayor Sam Yorty.
- Basing his opposition on a postcard survey of 600 property owners, in 1963 he urged the abandonment of a $250 million controversial urban renewal project of 182 acres in his downtown district, which would establish a complex of high-rise office buildings, apartments and businesses. The "blighted area" was bounded by the Hollywood and Harbor freeways, First Street and Glendale Boulevard.
- He introduced a successful resolution in 1966 honoring Police Chief William H. Parker; it stated that Parker had done "everything in his power to establish a pattern of realistic human relations in all aspects of community life." The resolution was opposed by all three Negro members of the City Council—Tom Bradley, Billy G. Mills and Gilbert W. Lindsay—and favored by the twelve white members. Cassidy said Parker had made "substantial contributions to community life."
- In 1966 he was an advocate of adding fluorides to Los Angeles drinking water to bring all parts of the city up to medical standards.
- Cassidy and nine other council members voted in favor of a resolution commending Police Chief Tom Reddin and his department for their actions in controlling a crowd of ten thousand anti-Vietnam War protesters at the Century Plaza Hotel in June 1967; there were 45 arrests and injuries to 40 marchers and four policemen. Four council members were opposed.

== Post-council ==
On July 1, 1967, a day after Cassidy left his City Council post, General Manager William Frederickson Jr. of the city's Recreation and Parks Department made an "emergency" appointment of Cassidy to a new post of the departmental public relations director at a salary of $17,988—which was $988 more than Cassidy was earning as a councilman. The appointment was castigated by Councilman Robert M. Wilkinson, Cassidy's successful opponent in the 1967 election, who had to drop the matter when it was determined that the council had no authority over the appointment.

In February 1968, though, it was announced that Cassidy had scored ninth in the civil service examination for the position and would have to give it up because the rules required the post be given to one of the top three candidates. He was quickly offered a job as field deputy for 15th District Councilman John S. Gibson, Jr.

In November 1968 Cassidy was subpoenaed to appear before a grand jury investigating a contract to design a $4 million golf complex in the San Fernando Valley, but he refused to testify on the grounds of possible self-incrimination. The hearing led to the indictment of City Councilman Thomas D. Shepard, who was convicted of receiving a bribe and served time in prison. Cassidy took a month's leave from his position as Gibson's deputy, saying he did not want to "embarrass you or your office." There is nothing in the public record about Cassidy subsequent to this.

Preceded by Ransom M. Callicott	Los Angeles City Council; 12th district 1962–67	Succeeded by Robert M. Wilkinson
