= 2011 Los Angeles elections =

- March 8, 2011

8 out of 15 seats in the City Council 8 seats needed for a majority
	Majority party	Minority party
Party	Democratic	Republican
Seats before	13	2
Seats won	6	1
Seats after	13	2
Seat change	Steady	Steady

The 2011 elections for elected officials in Los Angeles took place on March 8, 2011. Seven out of the fifteen members of the city council were up for election.

== Results ==
Officially all candidates are non-partisan. *Incumbent.

=== City council ===
District 2

Los Angeles City Council District 2 general election, March 8, 2011
Party	Candidate	Votes	%	±%
Democratic	Paul Krekorian	12,692	75.54%	
Independent	Augusto Bisani	4,109	24.46%	
Total votes		16,801	100.00	
Democratic hold		Swing		

District 4

Los Angeles City Council District 4 general election, March 8, 2011
Party	Candidate	Votes	%	±%
Democratic	Tom LaBonge	10,629	54.52%	
Independent	Tomas O'Grady	6,088	31.23%	
Independent	Stephen Box	2,778	14.25%	
Total votes		19,495	100.00	
Democratic hold		Swing		

District 6

Los Angeles City Council District 6 general election, March 8, 2011
Party	Candidate	Votes	%	±%
Democratic	Tony Cardenas	4,788	57.69%	
Independent	Rich Goodman	1,539	18.54%	
Independent	James "Jamie" Cordaro	1,238	14.92%	
Independent	David Barron	734	8.84%	
Total votes		8,299	100.00	
Democratic hold		Swing		

District 8

Los Angeles City Council District 8 general election, March 8, 2011
Party	Candidate	Votes	%	±%
Democratic	Bernard C. Parks	9,482	51.21%	
Independent	Forescee Hogan-Rowles	8,058	43.52%	
Independent	Jabari S. Jumaane	975	5.27%	
Total votes		18,515	100.00	
Democratic hold		Swing		

District 10

Los Angeles City Council District 10 general election, March 8, 2011
Party	Candidate	Votes	%	±%
Democratic	Herb Wesson	9,744	73.43%	
Republican	Andy Kim	1,480	11.15%	
Independent	Althea Rae Shaw	668	5.03%	
Republican	Luis Montoya	536	4.04%	
Independent	Chris Brown	490	3.69%	
Independent	Austin Dragon	351	2.65%	
Total votes		13,269	100.00	
Democratic hold		Swing		

District 12

Los Angeles City Council District 12 general election, March 8, 2011
Party	Candidate	Votes	%	±%
Republican	Mitchell Englander	13,751	57.74%	
Independent	Brad Smith	5,917	24.85%	
Republican	Navraj Singh	1,430	6.00%	
Independent	Kelly M. Lord, Jr.	1,298	5.45%	
Republican	Armineh Chelebian	1,027	4.31%	
Independent	Dinesh "Danny" Lakhanpal	392	1.65%	
Total votes		23,815	100.00	
Republican hold		Swing		

District 14

Los Angeles City Council District 14 general election, March 8, 2011
Party	Candidate	Votes	%	±%
Democratic	José Huizar	10,945	63.43%	
Independent	Rudy Martinez	6,310	36.57%	
Total votes		17,255	100.00	
Democratic hold		Swing		
