= John Lee (California politician) =

American politician (born 1970)

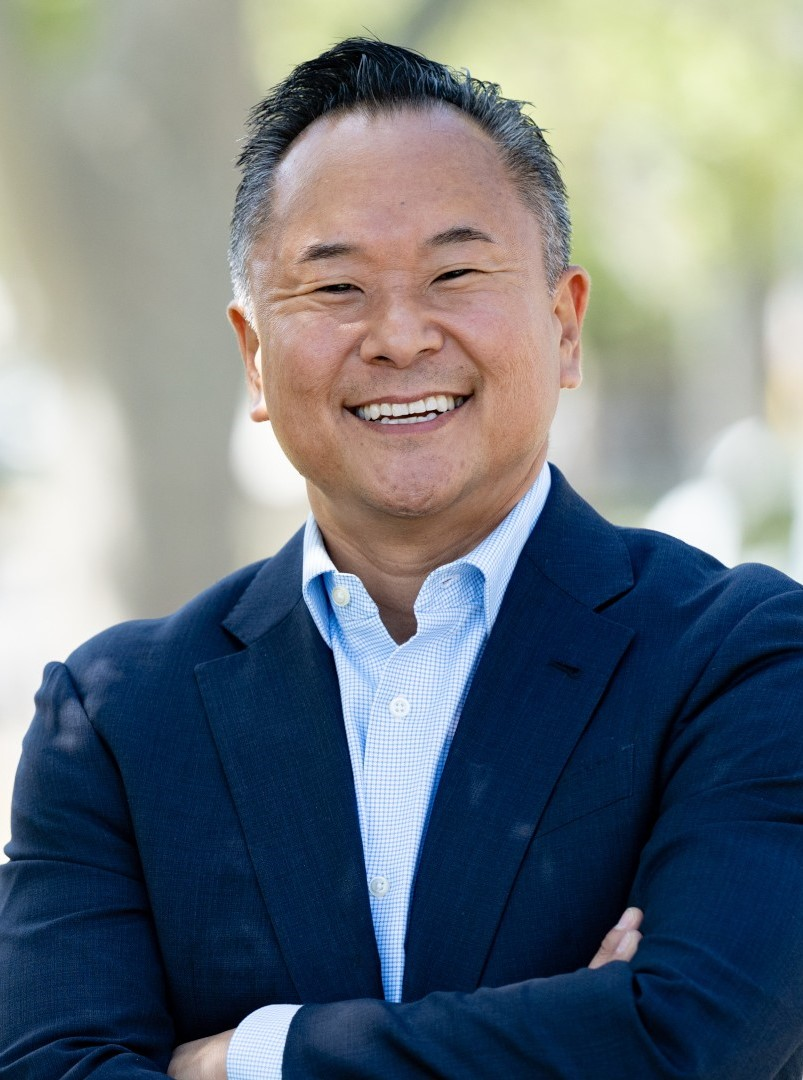
- Official portrait, 2019

Assistant President pro tempore of the Los Angeles City Council
- Incumbent
- Assumed office April 14, 2026
- Preceded by: Nithya Raman

Member of the Los Angeles City Council from the 12th district
- Incumbent
- Assumed office August 30, 2019
- Preceded by: Greig Smith

Personal details
- Born: June 29, 1970 (age 56)
- Party: Republican (before 2020); Independent (2020–present)
- Education: California State University, Northridge (attended)

John S. Lee (born June 29, 1970) is an American politician, serving as a member of the Los Angeles City Council for the 12th district. Formerly a Republican, Lee is now an independent and is the only non-Democrat currently on the city council.

== Early life and education ==
Born in 1970, Lee is the son of South Korean immigrants. He graduated from Granada Hills High School and attended California State University, Northridge, but fell short of his last credits due to personal issues following the 1994 Northridge earthquake.

== Career ==
Prior to being elected as the Councilmember, Lee worked for the City of Los Angeles for two decades, serving in various capacities. In his tenure he has worked for Councilmember Joel Wachs, Greig Smith, and Mitch Englander. Lee was a chief of staff for previous councilmember Mitchell Englander. Mitch Englander pled guilty to federal charges related to the on-going Los Angeles City Hall corruption probe and began serving a 14-month sentence in federal prison in June, 2021. Lee joined David Ryu as the second Asian American on the council, being sworn in on August 30, 2019.

== Los Angeles City Council (2019–present) ==
Lee declared his candidacy for the 2019 special election following the departure of the previous Councilmember. Lee's campaign immediately gained front runner status in a crowded field with 15 total candidates, bolstered by the support from over 100 community leaders and local officials. Lee came in second place after the primary election and moved into the general election versus Loraine Lundquist. After a contentious campaign cycle, Lee won the seat and served out the remainder of the term.

=== Environment ===
Lee has committed to supporting the California Clean Energy Commission's proposal to close down the Aliso Canyon natural gas storage facility. In 2019, Lee proposed a resolution urging Governor Gavin Newsom to make good on the promise of shutting the facility down.

Lee has also worked with LADWP and Electric Power Research Institute on a pilot program focused on sustainable farming located entirely within shipping containers. The container's initial yield will serve as a model for successful and sustainable farming in an urban environment.

=== Homelessness ===
Lee has advocated for Neighborhood Safety Teams that would increase the number of police patrols in business corridors, specifically dedicated to stopping crime stemming from homeless encampments. Lee has also advocated for the creation of a Housing Task Force to build housing that focuses on job training programs.

=== Policing and public safety ===
Lee has been one of the biggest supporters of the Los Angeles Police Department on the council. Lee has stated his opposition for defunding the LAPD, citing the department's many reformations throughout the last decade including de-escalation and implicit bias training. He officially rejected calls to defund the LAPD when he cast one of two votes in opposition of the City Council's decision to slash the department's budget.

=== Transportation ===
Lee supports allowing companies like Uber and Bird to provide e-scooters in his district; however, he stated that it should be limited and not encompass the entire district. He referenced California State University, Northridge as an example of an appropriate location for the scooters.

== Controversies ==
=== Corruption allegations ===
Lee accompanied Englander as his chief of staff along with José Huizar staffer George Esparza on the June 2017 Las Vegas trip that led to Englander's corruption charges and guilty plea. Huizar and Esparza were both later charged with racketeering stemming from a related FBI investigation, to which Esparza pleaded guilty. According to the indictment in the Englander case, a top Englander staffer referred to as "City Staffer B" was given some of the same perks as Englander. Englander sent antedated checks for himself and the unnamed staffer to the businessmen who provided the perks after he was contacted by the FBI. Lee has declined to state whether he is "City Staffer B" repeatedly and claimed that he did everything possible to reimburse expenses for the trip. Multiple groups have called for John Lee's resignation on the assumption that he is the unnamed staffer.

On October 2, 2023, Lee was charged with 10 counts by the Los Angeles City Ethics Commission on October 2, 2023 for conduct related to his 2017 Vegas trip with his predecessor Mitch Englander. Lee filed a lawsuit against the Los Angeles City Ethics Commission in response to the charges against him. On December 13, 2025, a judge recommended a $43,730 penalty for Lee for repeatedly violating Los Angeles's gift laws, including on the 2017 Vegas trip. On December 17, 2025, the Ethics Commission issued Lee a $138,424 fine—the maximum financial penalty they were considering.

=== Sexual harassment lawsuit ===
Lee was accused of sexual harassment and discrimination by a former aide in a 2013 lawsuit. He denied the allegations. Lee was dismissed as a defendant and the lawsuit was settled by the city for $75,000.

== Personal life ==
Lee lives in Porter Ranch, California with his wife Sheila and their two children.

== Electoral history ==
Special general election for Los Angeles City Council District 12, 2019
| Candidate | Votes | % |
|---|---|---|
| John Lee | 16,724 | 52.1% |
| Loraine Lundquist | 15,395 | 47.9% |

Primary election for Los Angeles City Council March 3, 2020
| Candidate | Votes | % |
|---|---|---|
| John Lee | 33,007 | 50.61% |
| Loraine Lundquist | 32,206 | 49.39% |

Primary election for Los Angeles City Council March 5, 2024
| Candidate | Votes | % |
|---|---|---|
| John Lee | 33,574 | 62.30% |
| Serena Oberstein | 20,314 | 37.70% |
