= Neil Papiano =

American lawyer (1933–2019)

Neil Papiano (November 25, 1933 – February 14, 2019) was an American lawyer, and managing partner of Iverson, Yoakum, Papiano & Hatch. He received Bachelor of Arts and Master of Arts degrees from Stanford University, the latter in 1957, and an LL.B. from Vanderbilt University Law School in 1961. He was admitted to the State Bar of California in 1961.

In February 2014, Papiano was declared "not eligible to practice law" by order of the State Bar Court of California.

According to court papers filed by his attorney, Papiano had been diagnosed with dementia and also had financial problems. Papiano's current mental state was outlined in a letter attached to his attorneys' court papers, in which Dr. Helena Chang Chui stated that he had moderate to severe dementia due to Alzheimer's disease.

== Legal career ==
=== Finley v. Kuhn ===
In the mid-1970s, Papiano was hired by Oakland Athletics owner Charlie Finley to file a restraint-of-trade lawsuit against Major League Baseball and Commissioner Bowie Kuhn. In the spring of 1976, Finley commenced a "fire sale" of the team's highly paid players, including Reggie Jackson. When Finley sold Vida Blue to the New York Yankees and Joe Rudi and Rollie Fingers to the Boston Red Sox, Kuhn voided the sales as being contrary to the "best interest of baseball." Papiano and Finley lost the case, as the court ruled that "the Commissioner has the authority to determine whether any act, transaction, or practice is not within the best interest of baseball, and upon such determination, to take whatever preventative or remedial action he deems appropriate, whether or not the act, transaction, or practice complies with the Major league Rules or involves moral turpitude." Charles O. Finley vs. Bowie Kuhn, 7th Circuit, 1978. The judge stated that the question before him was not whether he agreed with Kuhn's action, but whether Kuhn had the power to act.

=== Elizabeth Taylor vs. the National Enquirer ===
In 1990, Papiano represented Elizabeth Taylor in a lawsuit against the National Enquirer for libel and defamation of character. Papiano and Taylor cited two articles, one that said she had brought liquor into her hospital room when she was ill and another that said she was suffering from lupus. While the case was pending, Papiano complained to The New York Times about the Enquirer's litigation tactics, which included filing motions asserting that the complaint was insufficient, seeking to move the case from state to federal court and requesting Ms. Taylor's medical records from the past 30 years. Papiano stated: "I think they'll do everything they can to drag this on for a while. Their object is to drag their feet. Our's is to move forward." The case was settled in May 1991, with the Enquirer issuing an apology and paying an undisclosed amount of money. While neither side would disclose the amount of the settlement, Papiano said, "Miss Taylor is very delighted with it, and small things do not make her happy."

Papiano filed a second suit for Taylor against the National Enquirer in the mid-1990s. That suit alleged that a March 1993 article about Taylor and husband Larry Fortensky's alleged involvement in a property dispute had damaged their reputation and invaded their privacy. The suit was unsuccessful, and in November 1996 Superior Court Judge Fumiko Wasserman ordered Taylor and Fortensky to pay $432,600 to cover the Enquirer's legal costs.

Papiano also represented Taylor in 1995 in an unsuccessful effort to "quash" an NBC mini-series about Taylor's life, and in connection with the dissolution of her marriage to Larry Fortensky in 1996.

=== Steve Garvey ===
The 9th U.S. Circuit Court of Appeals in San Francisco overturned an arbitrator's ruling that found the San Diego Padres' refusal to extend Steve Garvey's contract beyond the 1987 season was not the result of collusion between club owners. The ruling entitled Garvey to more than $3 million, plus interest, from a $280 million fund created by baseball team owners in 1990 for players affected by the collusion.

In the federal appeals court, Garvey won the case of collusion against baseball owners, with the help of a former Padres president who came forward after a decade to support the former first baseman's claim after an arbitration decision found that major-league owners agreed to hold down signings and salaries of free agents from 1985 through 1987.

=== Joan Collins vs. Globe International ===
Papiano also represented Joan Collins in a suit against the publisher of Globe. The tabloid newspaper published a story in 1991 that included photographs taken with a high technology lens of Collins and a male guest and their conduct while on private property. In addition to claims for invasion of privacy and defamation, the suit filed by Papiano on Collins' behalf alleged that the taking of the photographs and the publication and distribution of the article were "racketeering" activities and attempted to allege a Racketeer Influenced and Corrupt Organizations Act (RICO) cause of action. In August 1992, the California Court of Appeal directed the lower court to dismiss the RICO claim. Globe International, Inc. v. Superior Court (Joan Collins), 9 Cal. App. 4th 393 (Cal. Ct. App. 1992).

=== Locke v. Warner Bros. Inc ===
Papiano represented actress-turned-director Sondra Locke in a lawsuit against Warner Bros., accusing the studio and Clint Eastwood of conspiring to keep her out of work. Locke's lawsuit alleged that after Eastwood ended his relationship with her, he settled her palimony claim in part by telling Locke he had set up a three-year, $1.5 million development deal for her at Warner Bros. After the studio rejected all of her projects, she accused the studio of conspiring to keep her from directing and producing as a favor to Eastwood, one of Hollywood's biggest stars. In 1999, the suit was settled, though the terms of Locke's settlement were not disclosed.

=== Peggy Garrity vs. Sondra Locke ===
Papiano defended Locke in a litigious fall-out with her previous attorney, Peggy Garrity, who sued the ex-star in June 1999 for cutting her out of $1 million in fees. Garrity also sought $5 million in punitive damages, citing Locke's loose relationship with the truth. In October 1999, the suit was settled in Garrity's favor.

=== MTA bus strike ===
In 2000, Papiano served as a mediator in the Los Angeles Metropolitan Transportation Authority bus strike. Rev. Jesse Jackson was also involved in the negotiations to end the bus strike.

=== Walter Matthau Estate vs. Columbia Pictures ===
In May 2002, Papiano filed a lawsuit on behalf of the Estate of Walter Matthau, seeking $1 million from Columbia Pictures for payments allegedly due for Matthau's work on the 1969 film Cactus Flower and the 1978 film California Suite. The lawsuit alleged breach of contract and fraud.

In 2007, Papiano represented Matthau's son in a suit with the William Morris Agency, which was Matthau's agent from 1960 to 2000. The agency alleged that, during Matthau's lifetime, he had paid the agency ten percent of his income on contracts negotiated or procured by the agency. The agency also alleged that, after Matthau's death, his wife continued making the payments. When Matthau's son succeeded to his father's interests in 2004, the agency alleged that he ceased making payments. Papiano successfully argued to the Court of Appeal that the arbitration agreement signed by Matthau with the agency was not binding on his son.

=== Laffit Pincay suit against ambulance company ===
In 2007, Papiano represented jockey Laffit Pincay Jr. in a lawsuit against an ambulance company (Huntington Ambulance) alleging that Pincay suffered two broken bones in his neck during a riding accident in 2003, and that the ambulance company failed to follow appropriate procedures when its employees allowed Pincay to walk under his own power to the ambulance. Pincay was awarded $2.7 million. After the award, Papiano said: "This was a justifiable result for the circumstances and the lack of treatment, the jury found that with proper treatment, Laffit would still be riding today."

=== Libel suit by Napa priest ===
In 2004, Papiano filed a libel action on behalf of a Napa priest in a lawsuit filed against the Roman Catholic Archdiocese of Los Angeles stemming from an accusation to the Church that the Monsignor had molested a grade-school girl more than 30 years earlier in Southern California, even though he had never been criminally charged. The libel action was filed in Los Angeles County Superior Court against the woman who made the accusations, as well as the woman's lawyer and the Survivors Network of those Abused by Priests, a national advocacy group for priest sex abuse victims. Papiano said of the priest: "We're defending his honor." The defendants contended that the libel action was intended to silence victims of priest abuse, a move they said contradicted the U.S. bishops' invitation to victims to come forward. The national director of SNAP said of the suit filed by Papiano: "It's clearly an intimidation tactic." Papiano said that his client wanted the woman, the law firm and SNAP to drop their allegations of abuse and issue apologies. "All they have to do is just walk away now", Papiano was quoted as saying. But if the case progressed, Papiano said he would incur costs that he would attempt to recover from the plaintiffs.

In May 2004, Judge Jon M. Mayeda threw out the libel lawsuit as to the Survivors Network. The regional director of the Survivors Network, Mary Grant, noted at the time: "Church leaders for too long have been allowed to isolate victims, blame them as though the crime was their fault. ... This is a public safety issue and we're not going to be silent about it." Grant called tho woman a "brave survivor" and said that because the priest remained in active ministry, "we are worried about the safety of youngsters around him." Papiano noted in court that Alzugaray was cleared by two church investigations. Papiano asserted that his client "is not a molester. He has never been a molester" and added that the judge's decision would be appealed. In September 2004, the libel suit against the woman's lawyer was also stricken by the court, a decision which was subsequently affirmed by the California Court of Appeal.

In September 2006, the Survivors Network filed a lawsuit accusing Papiano and the priest of malicious prosecution.

In July 2007, the Roman Catholic Archiocese of Los Angeles settled the case. Papiano said the Archdiocese reached settlement in his case without his client's permission. Papiano told the Associated Press: "Here's a good man, a real good man who has always been wonderful to the church who just gets left out of this." At the time of the settlement (which included more than 500 other claims), Cardinal Roger Mahony made a public apology, saying: "There really is no way to go back and give them that innocence that was taken from them. The one thing I wish I could give the victims ... I cannot."

=== Raphaelson Trial ===
In 2007, Papiano represented Robert Raphaelson and two others in an eight-day jury trial in Las Vegas federal court. Plaintiffs accused Papiano's client of secretly selling jointly-held season breeding rights to stallions—often years in advance—and later fabricating documents to represent to plaintiffs that they were same-year deals. The jury found in favor of plaintiffs and awarded damages of approximately $1.9 million. Coupled with a partial summary judgment of $510,625 entered against the defendants before trial, total damages approaching $2.4 million were awarded, including $1.6 million in punitive damages. Papiano argued his client was forced into secrecy because plaintiff allegedly sabotaged previous deals by wanting to hold out too long for the highest possible price. Papiano also claimed plaintiff owed Raphaelson $160,000, which he said "will probably be a separate lawsuit." Papiano said he was confident the $1.6 million in punitive damages would be reduced by a post-trial motion. Papiano also said: "You're never happy with damages. But when you get sued for many millions of dollars, and the jury comes down with 280-some thousand dollars -- it sounds like a big number, but not when you are being sued for millions of dollars." Plaintiffs' attorney claimed the actual pre-trial settlement offer was $1,035,625, or $525,000 above the summary judgment damages. In any event, plaintiffs' attorney said that even if damages were reduced, it could hardly be claimed a victory for defendants. Plaintiffs' attorney said: "What do you think is the best outcome: Pay to settle the case … or … have a jury of your peers tell the world that you committed breach of fiduciary duty, conversion and fraud and that you acted with oppression and malice?" Raphaelson's wife, Lucille Raphaelson, was not found liable on any count. Plaintiffs also asked the court to refer aspects of the case to law enforcement for an investigation into alleged fraudulent documents. As of December 5, 2007, final judgment had yet to be entered.

=== Pincay/McCarron vs. Andrews ===
Papiano represented Hall of Fame jockeys Laffit Pincay and Chris McCarron in a lawsuit against Vincent Andrews, Robert Andrews, and Vincent Andrews Management Corp. Defendants had been the jockeys' investment advisors for nearly 20 years from 1969 to 1988. After losing money on investments, the jockeys sued the Andrews in 1989 alleging of breach of contract, breach of fiduciary duty, and violations of the federal Racketeer Influenced and Corrupt Organizations (RICO) statute. A jury returned verdicts on both the state and RICO claims against the Andrews, awarding Pincay $670,685 and McCarron $313,000 in compensatory damages. Pincay also received $2.25 million, and McCarron roughly $1.3 million, in punitive damages for the state law violations. Pincay was ordered to elect a remedy, and he chose to pursue the RICO judgment. This judgment was reversed on appeal on the ground that the RICO claim was barred by the federal statute of limitations. Pincay v. Andrews, 238 F.3d 1106, 1110 (9th Cir. 2001). On remand, Pincay elected to pursue the remedy on his California law claim, and judgment was entered in his favor on July 3, 2002. "Pincay v. Andrews" (PDF). Archived from the original (PDF) on March 9, 2005., No. 02-56577 (9th Cir. Nov. 2004). In December 2005, the U.S. Supreme Court denied the defendants' petition for a writ of certiorari. As of February 2006, the horse-racing publication The Blood-Horse reported that Pincay was owed nearly $4.5 million and McCarron just under $2.4 million. Santa Anita, Pincay Settle Injury Lawsuit - bloodhorse.com

=== Other matters ===
In 2010, in what turned out to be his last jury trial, Papiano defended Robert Rudolph, the recipient of a thoroughbred horse named Alison Cat who claimed that he did not purchase the horse, but rather took the horse on consignment to train, race and sell for the owner with a split of profits in excess of $160,000. Rudolph Weddington, the Plaintiff, prevailed as the jury decided that the horse was either sold to Rudolph or Rudolph stole the horse when he had the Jockey Club registration changed to his name. The horse was placed in a $32,000 claiming race by Rudolph. Weddington successfully had Alison Cat scratched from the race and filed suit against Rudolph. The case was tried in San Diego County Superior Court and the jury awarded Weddington $160,000 alternatively based upon breach of contract or conversion [civil theft]. Weddington was represented by attorney Laurence F. Haines of Escondido. After Rudolph appealed, the judgment was upheld in its entirety in March 2012.

Other clients include Nederlander Organization, The Thoroughbred Corporation, and Lockheed Martin. Papiano appeared on ESPN SportsCentury twice.

== Hal Bernson scandal ==
In 2000, Papiano became involved in an investigation by the Los Angeles Ethics Commission over what the Los Angeles Times called his "long and controversial" relationship with Los Angeles City Councilman Hal Bernson. According to the Times, Bernson paid Papiano $140,000 for a half-interest in an ocean-view condominium with an assessed value of $387,000. Allegations also arose that Papiano's law firm had provided free legal services to Bernson while the Ethics Commission was investigating Bernson for using officeholder accounts to buy season tickets to the Hollywood Bowl. However, these services were not those provided by Papiano, considered a "volunteer" lawyer, but by two lawyers and a paralegal at the firm who at one point used about 10 percent of their time during certain months of 1996–97 on the Bernson matter. Bernson ultimately agreed to pay $3,000 in fines for accepting excessive free legal services, and the commission also imposed a $4,000 fine on Papiano's law firm. The fine was the first of its kind issued by the Ethics Commission. While Papiano's firm claimed that it did not know its free legal work for Bernson could be considered a campaign contribution, Ethics Commissioner Dale Bonner questioned the claim by the law firm. The stipulated agreement signed by Bernson and Papiano's firm admitted: "The councilman and his officeholder expense fund committee were never billed by the firm and the councilman and his officeholder expense fund committee never paid for the legal services . . . " The Los Angeles Times also reported that an independent hearing officer reported that "Papiano told ethics officials that he would provide detailed information about how money from Bernson's officeholder account was used to buy Hollywood Bowl tickets if ethics officials would agree to drop the case against Bernson."

== Civic and political activities ==
Papiano is Senior Managing Partner at Iverson, Yoakum, Papiano & Hatch, a Los Angeles law firm with three members and approximately five other attorneys.

Papiano's civic activities include serving on the board of trustees of American University, Washington, D.C., from 1981 to 1995 and service on the Board of Advisors of the Alzheimer's Association of Los Angeles, 2006–2007. He has served as a member of the Board of Trustees of the Orthopedic Hospital (Los Angeles) and as a lecturer at the UC-Davis School of Law, McGeorge School of Law (part of University of the Pacific), and Georgetown University Law Center. Papiano also has been chairman of the Board of the Los Angeles Civic Light Opera Association and Los Angeles Forward (organization of 350 Los Angeles business persons and labor leaders formed to adopt a new Charter for the city) and member of the Board of Directors of the Los Angeles Performing Arts Council and Los Angeles Music Center Operating Company.

Papiano made a donation to the Los Angeles Zoo for a children's play park which bears his name. He also established the Ruth Papiano Giolman Scholarship at the University of Utah School of Social Work. and co-established the Winefred H. Dyer Scholarship at the University of Utah (please see page 12 of Scholarship Information for 2008–2009)

Papiano was also active in politics, having made contributions to the Republican National Committee ($25,000 in 2004), the Republican Party of Florida ($1,000 in 2001), the Republican Central Committee of Los Angeles County, Republicans Rudy Svorinich, Christopher Cox, Kay Bailey Hutchison, and Democrats Robert Torricelli, Mark Green, Rocky Delgadillo, Zev Yaroslavsky. He was also the leader of the project that led to the construction of an indoor arena in Anaheim, the Honda Center which opened in 1993.
