= Hal Bernson =

American politician (1930–2020)

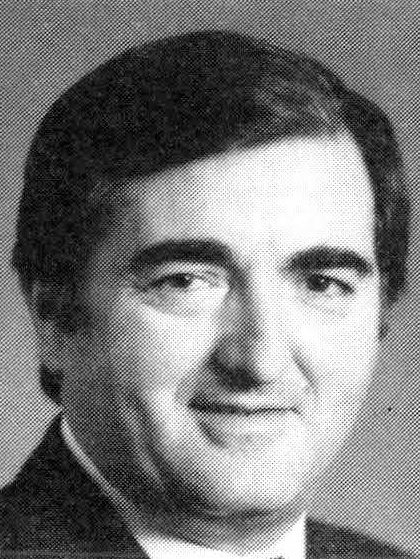
- Official portrait, 1986

Member of the Los Angeles City Council from the 12th District
- In office July 1, 1979 – June 30, 2003
- Preceded by: Robert M. Wilkinson
- Succeeded by: Greig Smith

Personal details
- Born: Harold Melvin Bernson; November 19, 1930 South Gate, California
- Died: July 20, 2020 (aged 89)
- Party: Republican
- Spouse: Robyn Bernson
- Children: 3

Harold Melvin Bernson (November 19, 1930 – July 20, 2020) was an American politician who was a member of the Los Angeles City Council for 24 years, from 1979 until his retirement in 2003. A conservative Republican, he was a leading proponent of the San Fernando Valley seceding from the rest of Los Angeles.

== Early life ==
Bernson was born in South Gate, California, on November 19, 1930, to Jewish parents, his father from Romania and his mother from Poland. He grew up in the Los Angeles neighborhood of Boyle Heights, where he became a bar mitzvah at the historic Breed Street Shul. He recalled that at the age of ten he attended services at the synagogue three times a day to recite a mourner's prayer for his father. As a young man, he served in the Navy and afterward ran a clothing store in Bakersfield. He moved back to Los Angeles in 1956 and to the San Fernando Valley in 1958.

== Civic activities ==
In 1977, he was the Northwest San Fernando Valley chairman for Senator Alan Robbins' anti-busing initiative and amendments before being on the steering committee for Yes on Proposition 13 in 1978. From 1978 to 1979, he was a columnist for the San Fernando Valley Chronicle He was also a cofounder and board member of CIVICC (Committee Investigating Valley Independence for the City/County). In partisan politics, he was a Republican.

== City Council ==
=== Elections ===
Bernson and Barbara Klein led the pack of sixteen candidates who in 1979 ran in Los Angeles City Council District 12, in the northwest San Fernando Valley, to succeed retiring Councilmember Robert M. Wilkinson. In the runoff, Bernson easily beat Klein by a vote of 24,825 to 12,415.

Bernson was reelected in every vote thereafter until his own retirement in 2003, although in 1991 he was forced into a runoff with Julie Korenstein, who was one of the challengers who attacked him for backing the controversial Porter Ranch development in his district (below). It was, however, not strictly true that Bernson was "pro-growth," the Times reported during that campaign, listing several incidents in which the councilmember had voted against developers' wishes. Bernson labeled Korenstein as "at one time . . . a Peace and Freedom member."

=== Highlights ===
==== 'Mister Earthquake' ====
Bernson was dubbed "Mister Earthquake," for his driven attitude toward making city building safe in the event of temblors. The Times said of that Bernson was

the most avid proponent of seismic safety on the Los Angeles City Council for more than a decade, spearheading a slew of safety-minded ordinances, including a widely copied law requiring the retrofitting of thousands of unreinforced masonry buildings. . . . He took an interest in seismic safety and decided to back the proposal, warding off angry building owners and others. . . . But the law did pass, in 1981.

He helped organize the city's first international earthquake conference, attended by 28 countries. He also developed a quake safety booklet for children and help create the "Quakey-Shakey Van," a vehicle that helped teach children about quake safety.

Nevertheless, Bernson refused aid from the Community Redevelopment Agency in rebuilding damage in his district from the 1994 Northridge earthquake on the grounds that the agency was trying to foist "social engineering" off on the area.

In 1997, he was given the Alfred E. Alquist Award for Achievement in Earthquake Safety.

==== Transportation and planning ====
He was chair of the council's Transportation Committee. He also served on the boards of the Los Angeles County Metropolitan Transportation Authority and the Southern California Regional Rail Authority. He was described as "a master of planning issues."

In 2002, at age 71 and cited as the "dean of the Los Angeles City Council, he served as chairman of the LACMTA, the rail authority and the Southern California Association of Governments at the same time. The Times noted that Bernson's service on these boards made him the "Stipend King" of the City Council because he was able to collect thousands of dollars in extra pay for attending their meetings. "I put in an awful lot of extra effort in those things I'm involved in," he said.

Bernson was presented the first Julian C. Dixon Award in November 2002 as "a leader in transportation [who had] made an outstanding contribution to the transportation community."

==== Porter Ranch ====
Bus tour. The councilmember guided his colleagues on a bus tour of his district in May 1989, pointing out such problem sites as the proposed 1,300-acre Porter Ranch development, "where a plan to develop the pristine rolling hills into a major $2-billion residential and commercial city center is at the forefront of public debate," and a development project in the Bryant-Street Vanalden neighborhood (below).

Compromise. Mayor Tom Bradley announced in December 1989 that he and Bernson had reached a compromise on the Porter Ranch project in Chatsworth, the biggest single development project in Los Angeles history.

==== Secession ====
Bernson took a leading role in a drive at the turn of the 20th–21st centuries for the San Fernando Valley to secede from the city of Los Angeles and perhaps even from the county. As well, the councilmember advocated that the Valley pull out of the Los Angeles Unified School District and form its own district for its own schools. He called the proposal the "hottest issue around"" and said the current school system was "a farce."

Later, he was a member of the county's Local Area Formation Commission, even while he was a "vocal advocate of speeding up the process" of getting Valley secession on the November 2002 ballot. Despite his statement that he would be neutral as a commissioner, City Council president Alex Padilla replaced him on the commission in August 2001 with Council Member Cindy Miscikowski, a secession opponent.

==== Ethics ====
In 1992, it was reported that the California Fair Political Practices Commission had opened "five separate inquiries into charges of various improprieties against Bernson, but each time closed its files without formal charges" being made.

The city's Ethics Commission found in 1994 that Bernson had failed to disclose the source of $11,000 in campaign contributions made by a private company and ordered him to repay the funds. While rejecting the commission's authority requiring him to repay the money, he said he would donate an equal sum to the police in his district.

In 1997, Bernson ended a two-year battle with the Ethics Commission by paying a $1,500 fine levied against him for spending $1,140 in officeholder account funds to buy season tickets to the Hollywood Bowl. The account is funded by lobbyists and supporters and can be used only on expenses related to serving and communicating with constituents. It was the first case of its kind brought against an elected official since the commission was created in 1990.

Later the same year, the Ethics Commission rejected a Bernson request to let his staff use Hollywood Bowl tickets that were intended for poor and disabled constituents, after about a hundred of them were left unused because residents who had asked for the complimentary passes never claimed them.

Three years later, the Ethics Commission and Bernson agreed that he would pay a $3,000 fine "for improperly accepting an excess amount of free legal services from the law firm of City Hall lobbyist Neil Papiano," who had represented Bernson in the Hollywood Bowl case. The law firm was also fined.

In 2001, he agreed that he would pay fines of $18,500 for accepting campaign contributions that exceeded legal limits. "There is no evidence that the violations were committed intentionally or willfully," a written agreement stipulated.

==== Travel expenses ====
An investigative feature by the Times found in April 1990 that Bernson was the "top travel spender" in City Hall, having paid out $120,622 of his campaign funds in three years for trips to places like Louisiana, Hawaii, Israel and Italy, in the latter two of which he and his wife stayed in "luxury hotels." Other trips were made by the couple to Paris, Hong Kong, London, Beijing, British Columbia, New York, Seattle, Boston and Carmel, California. He said the trips were proper and enabled him to do a better job as a councilmember.

==== Sunshine Canyon ====
In the 1980s and 1990s, Bernson was "the major foe" of a controversial proposed enlargement of a landfill project, or dump, in Sunshine Canyon in Granada Hills, at the eastern end of the Santa Susana Mountains. In 1992 he sued Browning-Ferris Industries, operator of the landfill, for libel, alleging that the company "leaked to news reporters a dossier containing false claims about Bernson's spending of public and private funds on travel" (above) in an attempt to discredit him. A Superior Court judge dismissed the action, but the State Supreme Court reinstated it in June 1994, ruling 4–2 that " the usual one-year time limit for filing libel lawsuits can be extended when defendants accused of disseminating allegedly defamatory material intentionally conceal their identities."

==== Other ====
Slum conditions. Bernson pushed a proposal through the City Council in 1985 that would have made it easier to evict some of the three thousand tenants in the crime-plagued, predominantly Latino Bryant Street-Vanalden Avenue neighborhood of Northridge, but backed off when Mayor Tom Bradley said he would veto it.

The councilmember said he "packed" a meeting in December 1985 with more than seven hundred Northridge residents, most of them Anglos who "repeatedly cheered" their approval of Bernson's controversial proposal to force out some of the tenants. He said he did so because Mayor Bradley had not invited him to the meeting even though the problem neighborhood was in Bernson's district.

Four years later, he said his efforts had paid off in transforming "some of the worst slums in L.A." into an "ornate gated community."

Pornography. He won approval in 1985 of an ordinance prohibiting new adult businesses, such as sexually oriented movie theaters, bookstores and night clubs, from opening within 500 feet of churches, homes and schools.

Salvadorans. Bernson was the only "no" vote in 1987 on a City Council offer of $10,000 for relocation assistance for Central American refugees allegedly threatened by El Salvador death squads.

Prostitution. The City Council acceded to his idea of publicizing the names of the men (and the few women) who were arrested for patronizing prostitutes.

Lieutenant governor. In 1989, Bernson's opening a campaign fund for a purported race for lieutenant governor drew criticism from California Common Cause as a way to circumvent the city's campaign contribution limits. He rejected the charge.

Toilets. The councilmember submitted an ordinance in 1993 requiring twice the number of toilets for women as for men in any future construction of public facilities.

Environment. In response to some criticism of his appointment to the South Coast Air Quality Management Board by Mayor Richard Riordan in January 1999, Bernson cited his defense of the Chatsworth Reservoir as a nature preserve and his authorship of the city's oak-tree preservation ordinance as evidence for his "solid" environmental credentials. A Times reporter wrote that "Bernson has lobbied for two decades" to preserve the reservoir that "he says should stand as a legacy of the San Fernando Valley's past for future generations."

== Personal life ==
Bernson and his wife, Robyn, had three daughters, Nicole, Holleigh and Sarah. They lived in Northridge, California. Holleigh Bernson, an "aspiring film director," was killed in a one-car traffic accident in October 1995 when she lost control of her car in a night drive through Griffith Park and it went off the road. Named in tribute to Holly Golightly, the Audrey Hepburn character in "Breakfast at Tiffany's," she had changed her name to Holleigh Rox-Anne Bernson. A city park in the Porter Ranch area of the San Fernando Valley was named in her honor, and Bernson gave $70,000 from his City Council discretionary fund to the American Film Institute to fund a scholarship named for her.

Bernson was known as "a man with a volatile temper, a tenacious politician with little tolerance for bureaucratic delays and council members who question his efforts." He was also said to be "often gruff" and "impatient with schmoozing."

In 2008, he was consulting on land use, transportation, environmental and government affairs.

Bernson died on the night of July 20, 2020, at the age of 89.

== Legacy ==
There is a Hal Bernson Meeting Room at 10038 Old Depot Plaza Road, Chatsworth.

Political offices
Preceded by Robert M. Wilkinson	Los Angeles City Council; 12th District; 1979–2002	Succeeded by Greig Smith
