= Los Angeles's 12th City Council district =

American legislative district

Councilmember
John Lee; I–Porter Ranch
since August 30, 2019
- Registration: 44% Democratic; 24% Republican; 32% No party preference
- Demographics: 47.7% White; 4.3% Black; 28.1% Hispanic; 16.4% Asian; 0.5% Other
- Population (2020): 262,032
- Registered voters (2017): 161,523
- Website: cd12.lacity.gov

Los Angeles's 12th City Council district is one of the fifteen districts in the Los Angeles City Council. It is currently represented by Independent John Lee since 2019 after he was elected to finish Mitchell Englander's term. Lee is the only Independent on the nonpartisan City Council, previously being a Republican much like his predecessors.

The district was created in 1925 after a new city charter was passed, which replaced the former "at large" voting system for a nine-member council with a district system with a 15-member council. At the time of creation, it was situated in Downtown Los Angeles before being moved to the San Fernando Valley in 1964. Within recent years up until 2020, the seat was held by Republicans and was considered a Republican stronghold within a Democratic city. It is the second largest district behind the 11th district.

== Geography ==
The district covers the northwestern San Fernando Valley communities of Chatsworth, Granada Hills, Northridge, Porter Ranch, West Hills, North Hills, Sherwood Forest and Reseda.

The district is completely within California's 32nd congressional district, California's 27th State Senate district, and overlaps California's 38th and 45th State Assembly districts.

=== Historical boundaries ===
From 1925 to 1964 the district occupied the same general area in northwest Downtown Los Angeles, Bunker Hill, and Westlake, with a district office at 1209 Huntley Drive. Between 1928 and 1954, the boundaries expanded the district. In 1954, it was now Downtown, between Figueroa and Catalina streets. In 1955, it bordered Venice Boulevard, Sunset Boulevard, and Figueroa Street.

In 1964, the council had discussed moving the 12th district to the northwest San Fernando Valley which had grown in population over the years, and incumbent John P. Cassidy agreed to do so, saying he would relocate to the area. At the time, the area included Granada Hills, Northridge, Chatsworth, Panorama City, and the northern half of Canoga Park and had a population of about 190,000.

== List of members representing the district ==
Councilmember	Party	Dates	Electoral history
District established July 1, 1925.
A. J. Barnes (Westlake)	Progressive	July 1, 1925 – June 30, 1927	Elected in 1925. Lost re-election.
Douglas E. Foster (Westlake)	Republican	July 1, 1927 – June 30, 1929	Elected in 1927. Lost re-election.
Thomas W. Williams (Silver Lake)	Socialist	July 1, 1929 – April 13, 1931	Elected in 1929. Died.
Vacant		April 13, 1931 – June 3, 1931	
Thomas F. Ford (Silver Lake)	Democratic	June 3, 1931 – March 1, 1933	Elected and appointed to finish Williams's term. Resigned when elected to the U.S. House of Representatives.
Vacant		March 1, 1933 – March 17, 1933	
James T. Carroll (Westlake)	Democratic	March 17, 1933 – June 30, 1933	Appointed, then elected to finish Ford's term. Not a candidate in the next election.
John W. Baumgartner (Westlake)	Democratic	July 1, 1933 – June 30, 1945	Elected in 1933. Re-elected in 1937. Re-elected in 1941. Re-elected in 1943. Retired.
Ed J. Davenport (Westlake)	Democratic	July 1, 1945 – April 16, 1948	Elected in 1945. Re-elected in 1947. Re-elected in 1949. Re-elected in 1951. Died.
Ed J. Davenport (Westlake)	Republican	April 16, 1948 – June 24, 1953	Elected in 1945. Re-elected in 1947. Re-elected in 1949. Re-elected in 1951. Died.
Vacant		June 24, 1953 – September 1, 1953	
Harriett Davenport (Westlake)	Independent	September 1, 1953 – June 30, 1955	Appointed to finish her husband's term. Retired.
Ransom M. Callicott (Westlake)	Republican	July 1, 1955 – November 14, 1962	Elected in 1955. Re-elected in 1959. Died.
Vacant		November 14, 1962 – December 7, 1962	
John P. Cassidy (Westlake)	Republican	December 7, 1962 – June 30, 1967	Appointed to finish Callicott's term. Elected in 1963. Re-elected in 1965. Lost re-election.
Robert M. Wilkinson (Porter Ranch)	Republican	July 1, 1967 – June 30, 1979	Elected in 1967. Re-elected in 1969. Re-elected in 1971. Re-elected in 1975. Retired.
Hal Bernson (Northridge)	Republican	July 1, 1979 – June 30, 2003	Elected in 1979. Re-elected in 1983. Re-elected in 1987. Re-elected in 1991. Re-elected in 1985. Re-elected in 1999. Retired.
Greig Smith (Granada Hills)	Republican	July 1, 2003 – June 30, 2011	Elected in 2003. Re-elected in 2007. Retired.
Mitchell Englander (Granada Hills)	Republican	July 1, 2011 – December 31, 2018	Elected in 2011. Elected in 2015. Resigned.
Vacant		December 31, 2018 – January 15, 2019	
Greig Smith (Granada Hills)	Republican	January 15, 2019 – August 23, 2019	Appointed to serve until next election. Retired.
John Lee (Porter Ranch)	Republican	August 30, 2019 – January 12, 2020	Elected to finish Englander's term. Re-elected in 2020. Re-elected in 2024.
John Lee (Porter Ranch)	Independent	January 12, 2020 – present	Elected to finish Englander's term. Re-elected in 2020. Re-elected in 2024.
