= Greig Smith =

American politician

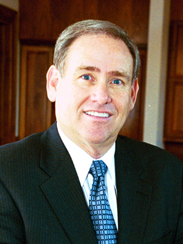
- Official portrait, 2003

Member of the Los Angeles City Council from the 12th district
- In office January 15, 2019 – August 23, 2019
- Preceded by: Mitchell Englander
- Succeeded by: John Lee
- In office July 1, 2003 – July 1, 2011
- Preceded by: Hal Bernson
- Succeeded by: Mitchell Englander

Personal details
- Party: Republican
- Education: University of Southern California

Greig Smith is an American politician, who served as a member of the Los Angeles City Council from 2003 to 2011, and again briefly in 2019. A member of the Republican Party, Smith represented much of the San Fernando Valley.

== City Council ==
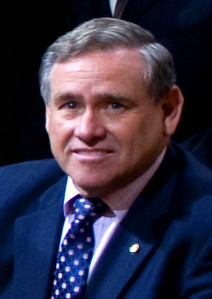
Greig while a member of the City Council in 2008.

Greig Smith was a member of the Los Angeles City Council from 2003 to 2011. On January 15, 2019, Smith was appointed to his previous seat on the Los Angeles City Council on a temporary basis. He represented the 12th District in the Northwestern San Fernando Valley, which includes Chatsworth, Granada Hills, Northridge, and other communities. Smith resigned on August 23, 2019. John Lee, who was elected to succeed Smith, was sworn to Smith's former Council seat on August 30, 2019.

He was elected to the L.A. City Council in 2003 defeating Los Angeles School Board member Julie Kornstein in the race to succeed Hal Bernson. At that time he was one of two Republican Party members of the City Council. His former seat was the only Republican seat on the council before Lee's switch to Independent in 2020.

In his prior service as a Councilmember, he made waste management his main issue and was successful in lobbying his colleagues to unanimously pass his comprehensive blueprint for the city, RENEW LA—Recovering Energy, Natural Resources, and Economic Benefit from Waste for Los Angeles.

Smith wrote the book If City Hall's Walls Could Talk, which was published in 2010. The book details the history of the Los Angeles city government, focusing on notable events that can be described as strange, funny, or intriguing.

== Personal life ==
Smith is also a Reserve Los Angeles Police Department Officer. He currently serves as a Cold Case Homicide Detective with the elite Robbery-Homicide Division. Prior to serving on the council, Smith owned a family clothing business, was the Chief of Staff to former Councilmember Hal Bernson, and was a community activist. He holds two degrees from the University of Southern California and a certificate from the University of California, Los Angeles.

Prior to his 2019 appointment, Smith was president of a consulting firm specializing in governmental liaison and representation, environmental and waste management expertise. The firm is Greig Smith Consulting LLC.

Political offices
Preceded by Hal Bernson	Los Angeles City Councilmember; 12th district July 1, 2003 – July 1, 2011	Succeeded by Mitchell Englander
Preceded by Mitchell Englander	Los Angeles City Councilmember; 12th district January 15, 2019 – August 23, 2019	Succeeded by John Lee
