= Porter Ranch, Los Angeles =

Porter Ranch
- Neighborhood of Los Angeles
- Location within Los Angeles/San Fernando Valley
- Coordinates: 34°16′53″N 118°34′17″W
- Country: United States
- State: California
- County: Los Angeles
- City: Los Angeles
- Named for: Benjamin Porter
- Elevation: 1,280 ft (390 m)

Population (2008 Los Angeles City Planner Estimate)
  - Total: 30,571
- Time zone: UTC-8 (PST)
  - Summer (DST): UTC-7 (PDT)
- ZIP code: 91326
- Area code: 818

Porter Ranch is a suburban neighborhood of the City of Los Angeles, in the northwest portion of the San Fernando Valley.

== History ==
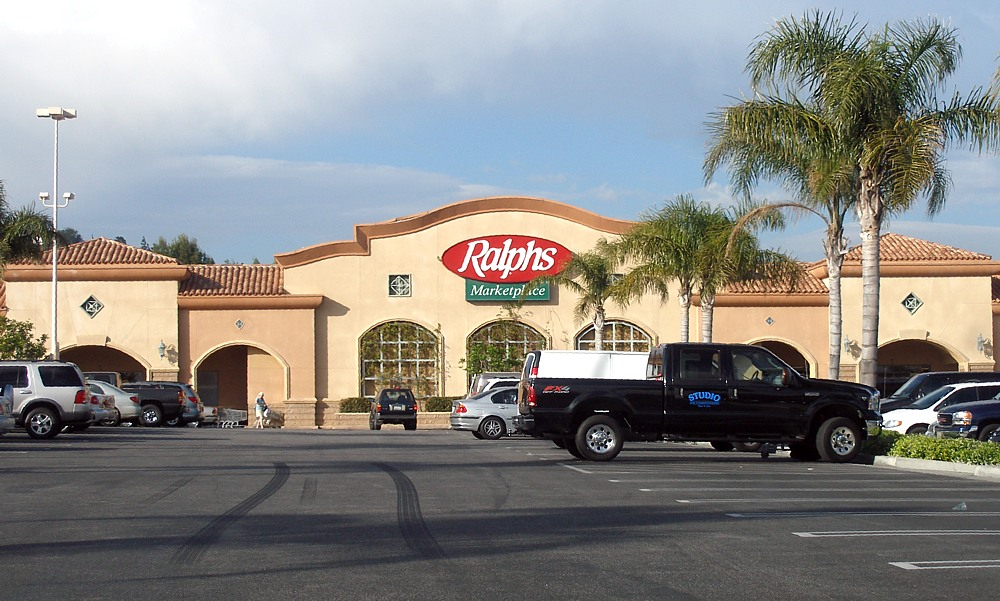
A Ralphs market in Porter Ranch, around 2006

The Porter family acquired part of Rancho Ex-Mission San Fernando in 1874.

Porter Ranch community started as a housing tract in the community of Northridge. This was along San Fernando Mission Blvd west of Reseda Blvd circa 1960–1963. Very few homes existed north of Rinaldi Street before 1965. In that year, the area was annexed by the City of Los Angeles. These homes were only accessible via Tampa Avenue which is a north-south street. Approximately 50 homes of the original tract were destroyed north of San Fernando Mission Blvd to build California State Route 118 which runs parallel to and south of Rinaldi street.

The new home construction projects that were completed in the Porter Ranch area in the 1990s–2000s, including the Renaissance Summit development, were mired in controversy and Los Angeles politics in the late 1980s and early 1990s. A two billion dollar master plan for real estate and commercial development for this largely undeveloped area on the edge of the San Fernando Valley was opposed by the "slow growth" movement. This movement was gaining traction through a combination of ballot initiatives and court cases along with growing environmental concerns. L.A. at that time was experiencing multiple environmental and infrastructure problems due to the previous decades rapid expansion, in terms of air quality, sewage capacity, and flood control. More locally, this combined with the "nimby" sentiment of existing and nearby residents of the Porter Ranch area who feared the increased traffic that would be brought by the planned building of an area commercial complex to service the new homes being built. Developments were also criticized for destroying the natural beauty of the brush and wild areas that inhabited the space before the houses were built.

However, Shapell Homes, a company founded by Nathan Shapell, a major Los Angeles builder, brought together powerful Los Angeles political figures to support the new home building.

=== Aliso Canyon Bridge ===
In the late 1980s, there was an attempt to connect Sesnon Boulevard, the road that flanks the north side of the neighborhood, to its counterpart across the Aliso Canyon, also named Sesnon, via a bridge to be named simply, the "Aliso Canyon Bridge". This plan never came to fruition due to demonstrations from the residents of Porter Ranch, the primary opponents of the bridge, who believed that connecting the road to the neighborhood across the canyon would bring "crime...drag racing, and drug dealing". Residents were also afraid of Sesnon becoming "a [highway] 118 alternate route", which would "send many cars through Porter Ranch".

Proponents of the bridge said that there was a "critical need" to build a bridge because "the city of Los Angeles has installed heavy-duty guard rails to stop any vehicle that is out of control as it moves east at Beaufait. There is a much smaller rail 200 feet farther east...however, the first guard rail is usually partially broken because of out-of-control vehicles hitting it. Before it can be repaired, there is almost no protection to prevent a vehicle from falling into Aliso Canyon. Additionally, if a vehicle heading west on Sesnon becomes lost, there is no barrier to prevent it from falling into this deep canyon." Despite the proponents' argument about the severity of the situation, the bridge was never built.

There is still evidence of the bridge seen from Sesnon heading east towards the canyon, the road (which is now closed off behind multiple guard rails) is visible heading towards the canyon just short of the bridge, and the counterpart is still visible on the west-bound side.

=== Aliso Canyon oil well fire ===
A company of Texas oil well firefighters, headed by the legendary Paul “Red” Adair, came to Oat Mountain and stopped a 1968 blaze after six days.

=== Gas blowout ===
On October 23, 2015, Southern California Gas Company workers discovered a leak in one of the over 110 wells at the Aliso Canyon natural gas storage facility, about one mile (1.6 km) north of homes in Porter Ranch. The gas blowout began spewing 110,000 pounds (50,000 kg) of methane per hour. The blowout involved gas stored under pressure in an underground reservoir; the stored gas included mercaptan (tert-Butylthiol), an odorant added to the odorless natural gas to produce a "rotten egg" smell for safety. The California Air Resources Board estimated that the leak increased California's methane gas emissions by 25%.

By order of the Los Angeles County Dept of Health, the company relocated thousands of families from the Porter Ranch area; the Federal Aviation Administration established a temporary flight restriction over the leak site until March 2016. On December 15, the county of Los Angeles declared a state of emergency, and two days later it approved a plan to close two schools in the area. Officials estimated that the leak would take months to repair.

On January 11, 2016 Mitchell Englander, the LA City Councilman representing Porter Ranch, said "Most people weren't aware that one of the largest gas storage facilities in the United States was in their backyard. There was, from what we're hearing, no disclosure when they bought their homes."

On February 18, 2016, state officials announced that the leak was permanently plugged.

On March 12, 2016, Los Angeles County Public Health Department officials say its test of dust in Porter Ranch homes turned up the presence of metals, including barium, that could have caused the kinds of health symptoms some residents have reported experiencing even after the big gas blowout was plugged.

=== Clampette fire ===
Sept. 25, 1970 this fire made a one-day 20-mile (32 km) run to the sea in Malibu from Newhall pass. This fire was the most destructive to date both in loss of property and life. One fatality was in Porter Ranch; there were four deaths total. The Porter Ranch death occurred as a homeowner tried to drive up Tampa through the flames to get to his family at the family home above the ridge (near Sesnon). Note that Tampa was abutted by brush on both sides north of Rinadi until you pass the ridge. It merged with two other fires. This event was part one of the event nicknamed "Shake and Bake", a combination of wildfire and earthquake. The fire burned along Rinaldi, crossing Rinadi just west of Reseda Blvd. A hill just northeast of Reseda/Renadi was named Cherry Hill after its grasses caused the hill to glow like a cherry.

=== 1971 Sylmar quake ===
This quake had a major impact on Porter Ranch, on the northwest portion along San Fernando Mission Blvd pools were half emptied, many block walls fell over, the area was without running water for a couple of weeks. Many of the homes floor joists were not bolted to the pylons underneath, causing remediation. A major aftershock was on a fault in Porter Ranch. Note: there were no issues with the Aliso Cyn oil field.

=== 1988 brush fire ===
About 5:00 am a brush fire propelled by 70 miles per hour (110 km/h) Santa Ana winds crossed Aliso Creek and destroyed 13 homes and damaged 23 mostly on Beaufait Avenue. The use of wood roof shingles was blamed for the enhanced level of destruction of the fire. Many residents fended off flames on their house roofs with garden hoses. The fire consumed 3,000 acres (1,200 ha) and $10 million (1988) in damages.

=== 2019 wildfire ===
On October 10, 2019, the Saddleridge Fire broke out in the nearby community of Sylmar due to an electrical power line short circuit. Despite efforts to control the fire, the blaze spread to Porter Ranch within a few hours, forcing the entire community to evacuate while burning some of the homes in the eastern part of the neighborhood. During these fires the skies were gray with ashes falling from the sky, and schools were closed for a few days due to the poor air quality and floating debris.

== Geography ==
The neighborhood is bounded by Brown's Canyon/Chatsworth on the south and west, Northridge on the south, and Granada Hills on the northeast and east. The Santa Susana Mountains, which separate the San Fernando and Santa Clarita valleys, lie to the north. The principal thoroughfares are Mason Ave., Corbin Ave., Porter Ranch Drive, Tampa Ave. and Reseda Blvd., running north–south, and Sesnon Blvd., Rinaldi St. and the Ronald Reagan Freeway (State Route 118), running east and west.

Porter Ranch is in the hilly northwestern tip of the San Fernando Valley, where, according to a 2008 Los Angeles Times article, it was a "calm outpost of Los Angeles" that attracted residents "seeking sanctuary from the urban hubbub." It was noted that the neighborhood had "some of the cleanest air in the Valley year-around—some of which is attributable to winds that sweep through the community regularly." Nevertheless, "those same winds, which have been clocked at 70 mph [110 km/h], take down trees and holiday lights." * Renaissance Summit is a neighborhood at the highest point of Porter Ranch.

== Demographics ==
According to the U.S. Census in 2000, the population was 24,923. Based on the Los Angeles Department of City Planning estimates, the population was 30,571 in 2008.

With a population density of 4,462 people per square mile (1,723/km^{2}), Porter Ranch is among the lowest-density neighborhoods of Los Angeles, but average for Los Angeles County as a whole.

=== Ethnic makeup ===
According to Mapping L.A. of the Los Angeles Times, Porter Ranch was "moderately diverse". The figures were 60.9% White, 26.8% Asian, 7.5% Latino, 1.8% Black and 3.0% other races.

A total of 8,385 (33.6%) of residents were foreign born, about average for both the city of Los Angeles and Los Angeles County. Korea (21.4%) and Philippines (9.3%) were the most common foreign places of birth.

=== Household makeup ===
Average household size was three people, about the same as the rest of the city and county. Of the housing units in Porter Ranch, 71.8% were occupied by homeowners, while 28.2% were occupied by renters.

== Arts and culture ==
Los Angeles Public Library operates a branch library within the community.

Porter Ranch is home to number of retail and commercial centers as planned by the Porter Ranch specific plan that was adopted in 1989. With the recent developments being the Vineyards at Porter Ranch, built in 2019 and The Porter Ranch Town Center that opened in 1999.

== Parks and recreation ==
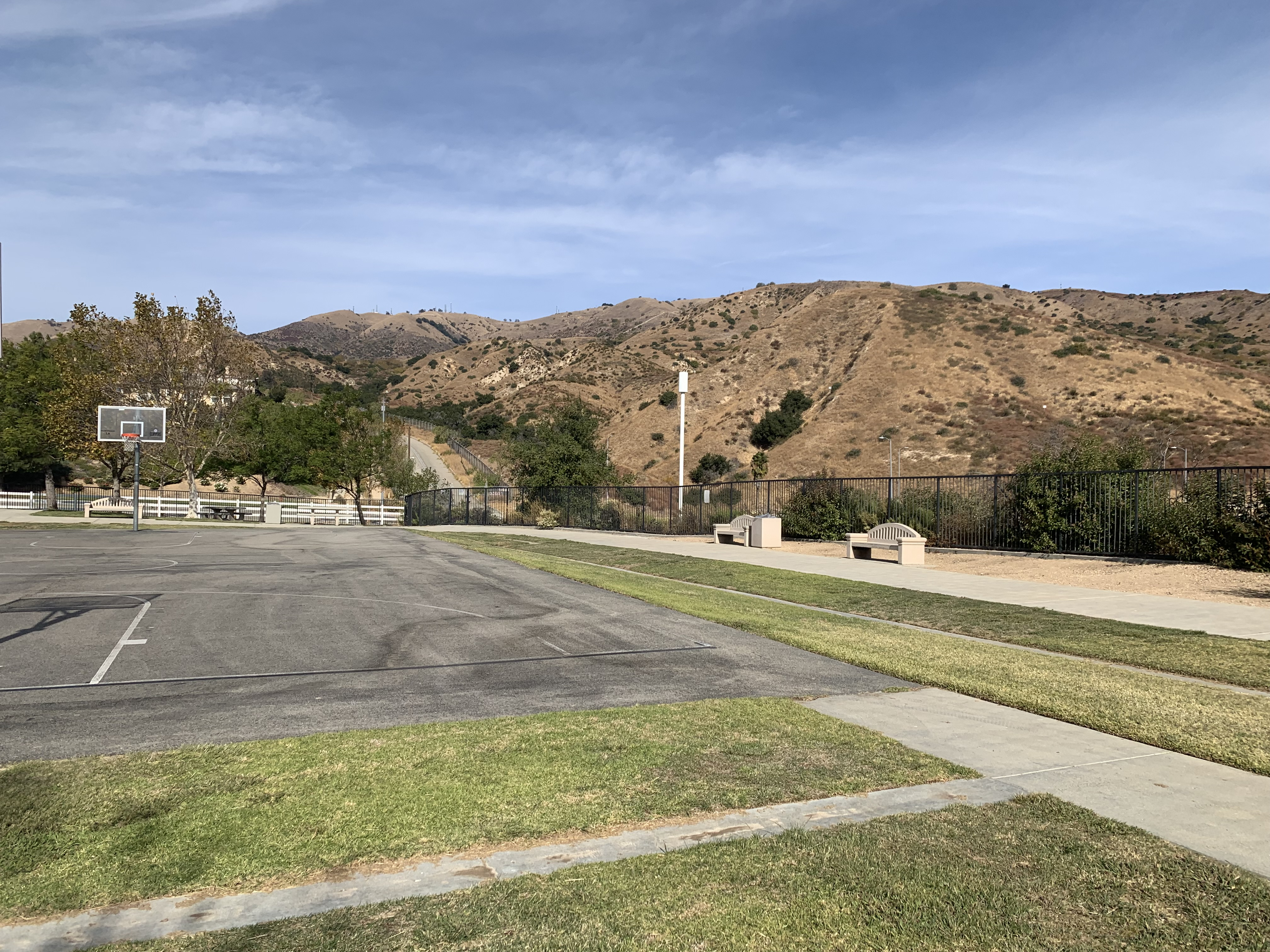
Holleigh Berson Memorial Park

Palisades Park is an unstaffed park in Porter Ranch. Others include Aliso Canyon Park, Rinaldi Park, Viking Park, Porter Ridge Park, Limekiln Canyon Park, Moonshine Canyon Park, and Holleigh Bernson Memorial Park. Porter Ridge Park was a filming location of the movie E.T. the Extra-Terrestrial (1982). In March 2022, the Los Angeles City Council backed a proposal to officially change the park's name to "E.T. Park" as it is commonly referred to by locals.

== Government ==
Porter Ranch is located in California's 27th congressional district, which is represented by Democratic George T. Whitesides. However, under the new congressional map imposed by Proposition 50 after passing in 2025, Porter Ranch is located in California's 32nd congressional district, which is represented by Democratic Brad Sherman under the 2026 election cycle.

The Los Angeles County Department of Health Services operates the Pacoima Health Center in Pacoima, serving Porter Ranch.

Porter Ranch is located in Los Angeles City Council District 12, currently represented by John Lee. It also is represented by the Porter Ranch Neighborhood Council.

== Education ==
Fifty-one percent of Porter Ranch residents aged 25 and older had earned a four-year degree by 2000, a high percentage for the city.

Schools within the Porter Ranch boundaries are:

- Castlebay Lane Charter School
- Porter Ranch Community School

== Infrastructure ==
Los Angeles Fire Department Station 8 and Station 28 are in the area.

Los Angeles Police Department operates from the nearby Devonshire Police Station.

== Notable people ==
- Robert M. Wilkinson (1921–2010), Los Angeles City Council member and Porter Ranch lobbyist
- Hal Bernson (1930–2030), Los Angeles City Council member, 1979–2003, when Porter Ranch development was approved
- Rin Keys (born 2008), rhythmic gymnast
- Lori Nelson (1933–2020), film and TV actress, mostly active in the 1950s and early 60s, died in her Porter Ranch home.
- Tee Grizzley (born 1994), hip hop artist
- Alex Padilla (born 1973), United States Senator
