= Mitchell Englander =

American politician (born 1970)

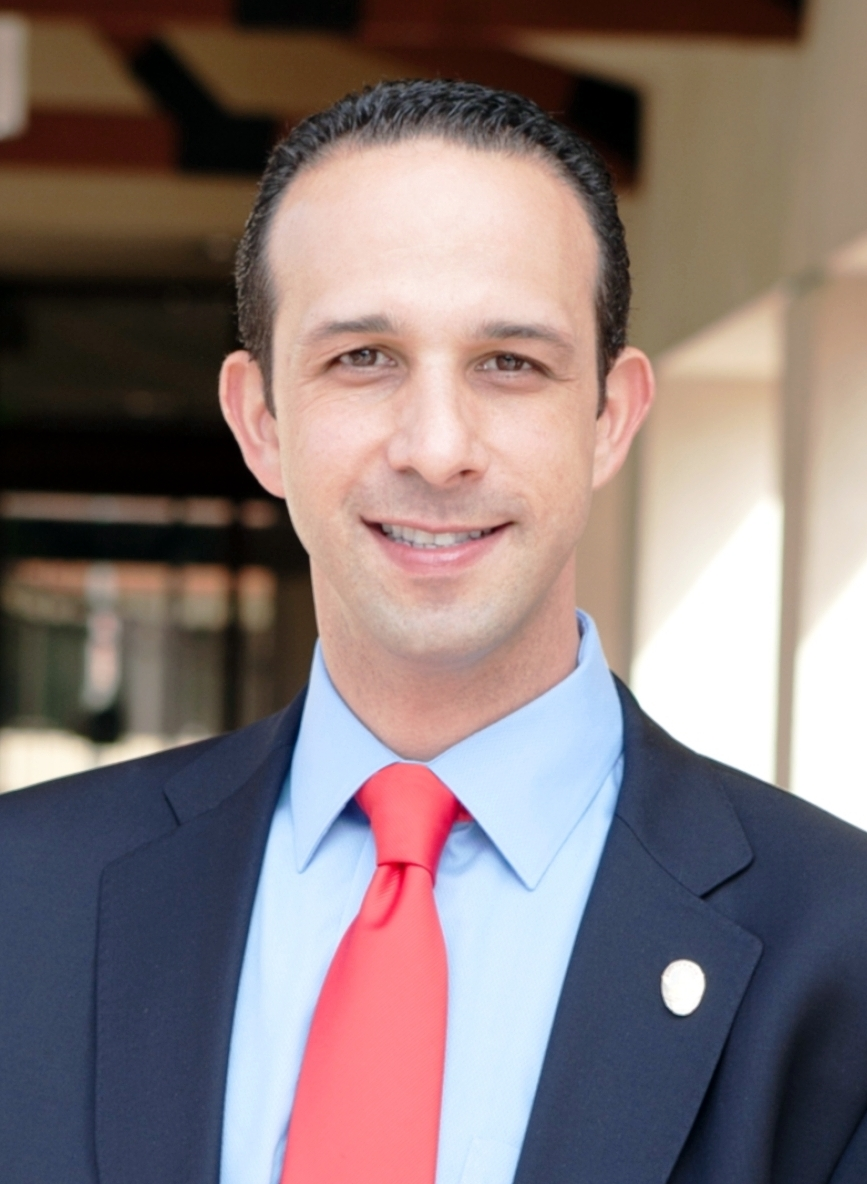
- Official portrait, 2011

Member of the Los Angeles City Council from the 12th District
- In office July 1, 2011 – December 31, 2018
- Preceded by: Greig Smith
- Succeeded by: Greig Smith

President pro tempore of the Los Angeles City Council
- In office July 1, 2013 – January 22, 2019
- Preceded by: Ed Reyes
- Succeeded by: Nury Martinez

Personal details
- Born: July 25, 1970 (age 56) West Hills, Los Angeles, California
- Party: Republican

Mitchell Englander (born 1970) is an American former politician who served as a member of the Los Angeles City Council, representing District 12 in the San Fernando Valley, until he resigned December 31, 2018. While serving in City Council, he was the only member of the city council who was registered as Republican.

Englander resigned in order to take a job with Oak View Group. He was subsequently indicted on corruption charges, as part of a major corruption probe at Los Angeles City Hall. Englander pleaded guilty to one felony charge on June 7, 2020.

== Biography ==
Englander was born in 1970 in West Hills in the San Fernando Valley. According to an interview with the Los Angeles Daily News, his parents separated when he was 5 years old, and his mother, Linda, a real-estate agent, "worked two jobs, but lost a home to foreclosure." They lived in Canoga Park with his uncle Michael, whose janitorial firm Englander worked for as a teenager. Englander attended college in Arizona but returned to California without graduating allegedly in order to care for his ailing mother, who later died of a brain tumor.

In 1994, his uncle Michael, who Englander said was a father figure for him, was shot and killed in a gang-related robbery. Englander became a Los Angeles Police Department reservist in 2005 the same day his uncle was killed, Englander's older sister Natalie suffered an asthma attack and fell into a coma. She was "rushed to an emergency room whose doors were mistakenly locked." She wasn't able to receive medical aid in time and "awoke with brain damage." She lived with the Englander family for a decade before she died.

Prior to elected office, Englander worked as a political consultant for another uncle, and later on his own. Englander is married to his "high school sweetheart". The couple appeared in the first-ever episode of House Hunters.

== City council ==
=== Campaign ===
Englander was chief of staff to City Councilmember Greig Smith from 2003 to 2009, in Los Angeles City Council District 12, then in the Northwest San Fernando Valley. Like the Councilmember before him, Englander joined the LAPD Reserves and used that platform to launch a run for office. In September 2009 Englander launched his campaign to succeed Smith, who had announced retirement upon his term's end.

Noting that Englander was the "consummate City Hall insider," the Los Angeles Times endorsed him as "the best of several good choices." An editorial noted that Englander's "proximity" to Greig Smith had "clearly brought him advantages in fund-raising," with more than $440,000 already raised, "which is 10 times as much as his closest rival (and more than any other candidate for city office this election)." The Times said that Englander had been Smith's "proxy" and "now claims to have played the leading role in a number of Smith's accomplishments." The L.A. Daily News endorsed him as well, saying that Smith presented "common-sense ideas to reform government, such as cutting general managers' base salaries but awarding bonuses to those who provide excellent service on a tight budget."

=== Election ===
Englander was elected to represent City Council District 12 in the March 8, 2011 primary, receiving 57.74% of the total vote.

==== Council activity ====
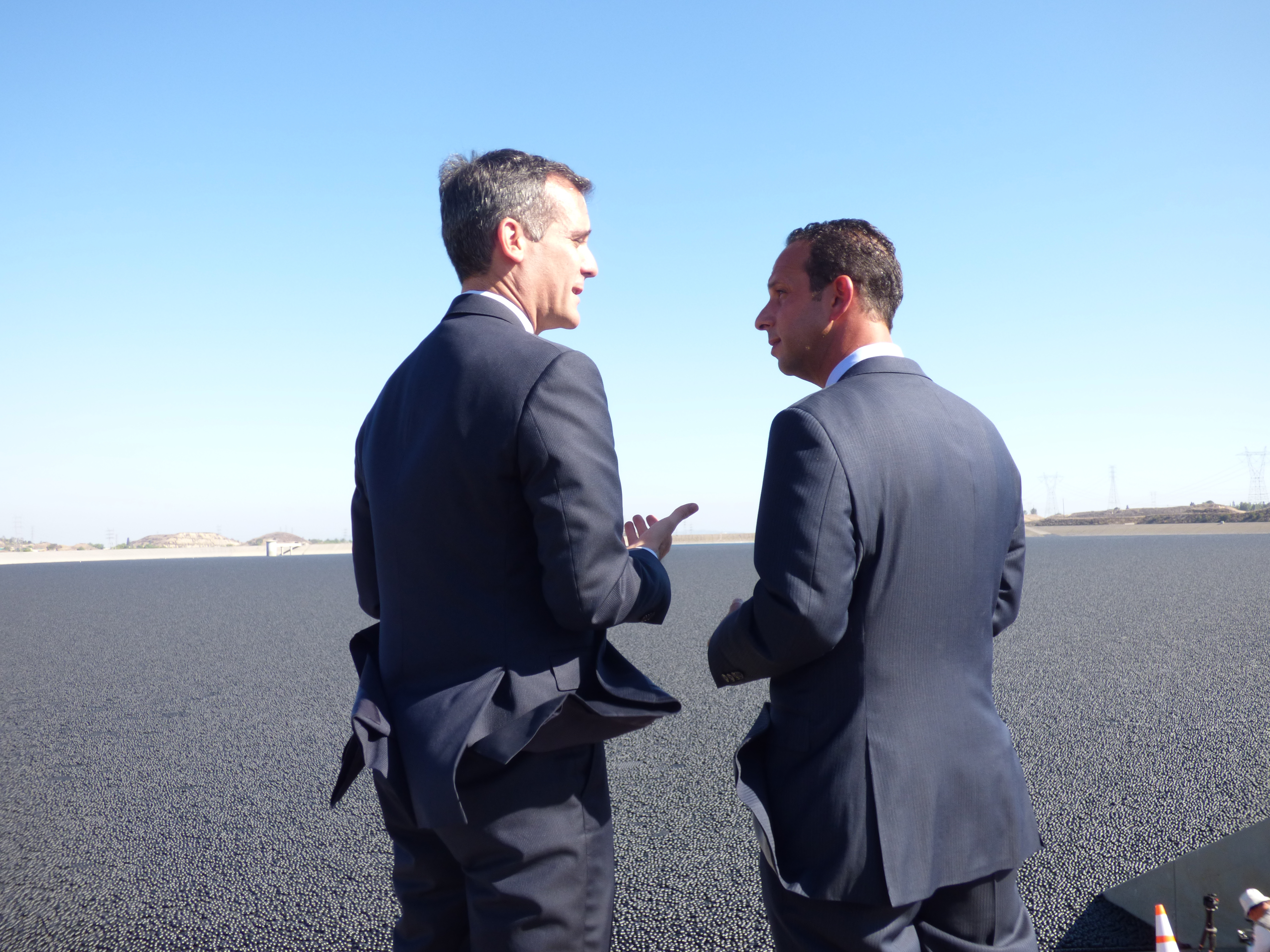
Englander with Mayor Eric Garcetti at the Silver Lake Reservoir in 2015

- Arizona boycott—On October 21, 2011, Englander called for an end to the city's boycott of Arizona, which had been voted in May 2010 after that state adopted Arizona SB 1070, a law requiring law-enforcement officers to ask for proof of U.S. citizenship from people in vehicles pulled over and suspected to be in the United States illegally. He said he would pay his own way to attend a National League of Cities conference in Phoenix, since the city would not do so.
- Minimum Wage-On May 19, 2015 Englander cast the lone dissenting vote when the Los Angeles City Council voted to raise the minimum wage in the city to fifteen dollars per hour in increments by 2020.

=== Resignation ===
On October 11, 2018, Englander announced that he would resign from the council to join Oak View Group, a sports and entertainment advisory, development and investment company, as vice president of government affairs.

=== Corruption conviction ===
Englander was indicted by a federal grand jury on January 16, 2020, for actions taken while still on the council. He was charged with one count of participating in a scheme to falsify material facts, three counts of making false statements, and three counts of witness tampering. The indictment became public when Englander surrendered to the FBI on March 9, 2020.

The indictment stated that this stemmed from trips to Las Vegas and Palm Springs on June 1–2, 2017, and June 10–12, 2017, paid for by unnamed people. In Las Vegas, Englander and at least two city staffers were said to have attended and received hotel rooms, VIP hotel amenities, casino chips (at least some of which were returned), limo rides, escort services, a $2,400 dinner, and a $34,000 visit to a nightclub. Englander is also alleged to have accepted an envelope containing $10,000 in cash given to him in the resort and casino's bathroom. In Palm Springs, Englander is said to have accepted another $5,000 at a casino.

On January 26, 2021, Englander was sentenced to 14 months in federal prison for his conduct. He pleaded guilty in July 2020 to falsifying material facts, and as part of a plea deal admitted lying to investigators over the course of three interviews. He was also ordered to serve three years under supervised release following his prison term and pay a $15,000 fine. Englander surrendered to the U.S. Federal Camp in Tucson, Arizona. He was released in February 2022.

Political offices
Preceded by Greig Smith	Los Angeles City Councilmember, 12th District; 2011–2018	Succeeded by Greig Smith
Preceded by Ed Reyes	President pro tempore of the Los Angeles City Council; 2013–2019	Succeeded by Nury Martinez
