= Los Angeles City Council =

Lawmaking body of Los Angeles, California

Type
- Type: Unicameral
- Term limits: 3 terms (12 years)

History
- Founded: February 25, 1889
- Preceded by: Los Angeles Common Council

Leadership
- President: Marqueece Harris-Dawson since September 20, 2024
- President pro tempore: Bob Blumenfield since September 20, 2024
- Assistant President pro tempore: John Lee since April 14, 2026

Structure
- Seats: 15
- Political groups: Officially nonpartisan: Democratic (14); Independent (1)

Elections
- Last election: June 2, 2026
- Next election: November 3, 2026

Meeting place
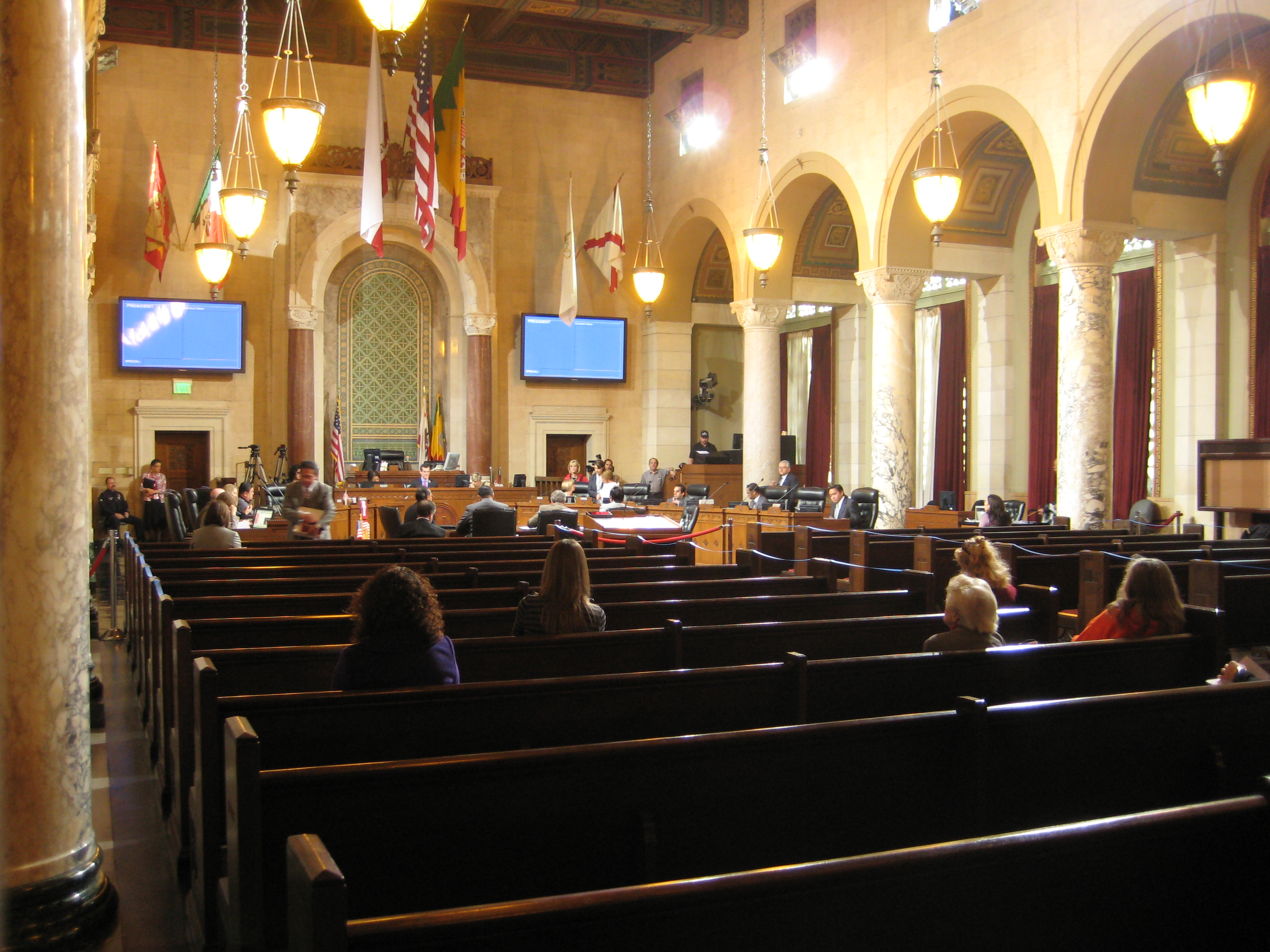
- Los Angeles City Hall; 1 John Ferraro Council Chamber, Room 340; Los Angeles, CA 90012-3224

Website
- lacity.gov/city-council

The Los Angeles City Council is the lawmaking body for the city government of Los Angeles, California, the second largest city in the United States. It has 15 members who each represent the 15 city council districts that are spread throughout the city's 501 square miles of land.

The head of the city council is the president, who presides over meetings of the council, gives assignments to city council committees, handles parliamentary duties, and serves as acting mayor of Los Angeles when the mayor is unable to perform their duties. The current president is Marqueece Harris-Dawson from the 8th district. The current president pro tempore is Bob Blumenfield from the 3rd district. The current assistant president pro tempore is John Lee from the 12th district.

As a nonpartisan council, the city council does not have a majority or minority leader, but the council is currently controlled by a Democratic majority with one independent. The city council has been nonpartisan since the passage of the 1909 city charter.

Council members are elected every four years, with the city council redistricting every ten years based on the previous United States census. Elections happen concurrently with other local and national elections, doing so since 2020.

== Composition ==
Post-2020 redistricting City Council districts map (from 2022) (Interactive version)

=== Council leaders ===
Title	Name	Party	District	Start
President	Marqueece Harris-Dawson	Democratic	8	September 20, 2024
President pro tempore	Bob Blumenfield	Democratic	3	September 20, 2024
Assistant President pro tempore	John Lee	Independent	12	April 14, 2026

=== Current members ===
District	Name	Party	Start	Next Election	Map
1	Eunisses Hernandez	Democratic	December 12, 2022	2030	Map
2	Adrin Nazarian	Democratic	December 9, 2024	2028	Map
3	Bob Blumenfield	Democratic	July 1, 2013	2026 (term-limited)	Map
4	Nithya Raman	Democratic	December 14, 2020	2027 Special (Mayor Elect) 2028 (Term Ends)	Map
5	Katy Yaroslavsky	Democratic	December 12, 2022	2030	Map
6	Imelda Padilla	Democratic	July 5, 2023	2028	Map
7	Monica Rodriguez	Democratic	July 1, 2017	2030 (term-limited)	Map
8	Marqueece Harris-Dawson	Democratic	July 1, 2015	2028 (term-limited)	Map
9	Curren Price	Democratic	July 1, 2013	2026 (term-limited)	Map
10	Heather Hutt	Democratic	September 2, 2022	2028	Map
11	Traci Park	Democratic	December 12, 2022	2030	Map
12	John Lee	Independent	August 30, 2019	2028	Map
13	Hugo Soto-Martinez	Democratic	December 12, 2022	2030	Map
14	Ysabel Jurado	Democratic	December 9, 2024	2028	Map
15	Tim McOsker	Democratic	December 12, 2022	2030	Map

== Salary ==
Members of the City Council earn $218,000 per year, the highest salary in the nation, due to a decision to make elected officials' salary equal with the salary of municipal judges.

City councilmembers can have their salary rescinded if they are suspended from the City Council. The Council can also control who can get pay if a member is suspended; when Mark Ridley-Thomas's pay was suspended by City Controller Ron Galperin after his suspension from the Council, his pay was reinstated after a council vote as he was not indicted. The decision was then reversed by Galperin's successor, Kenneth Mejia.

== Law ==
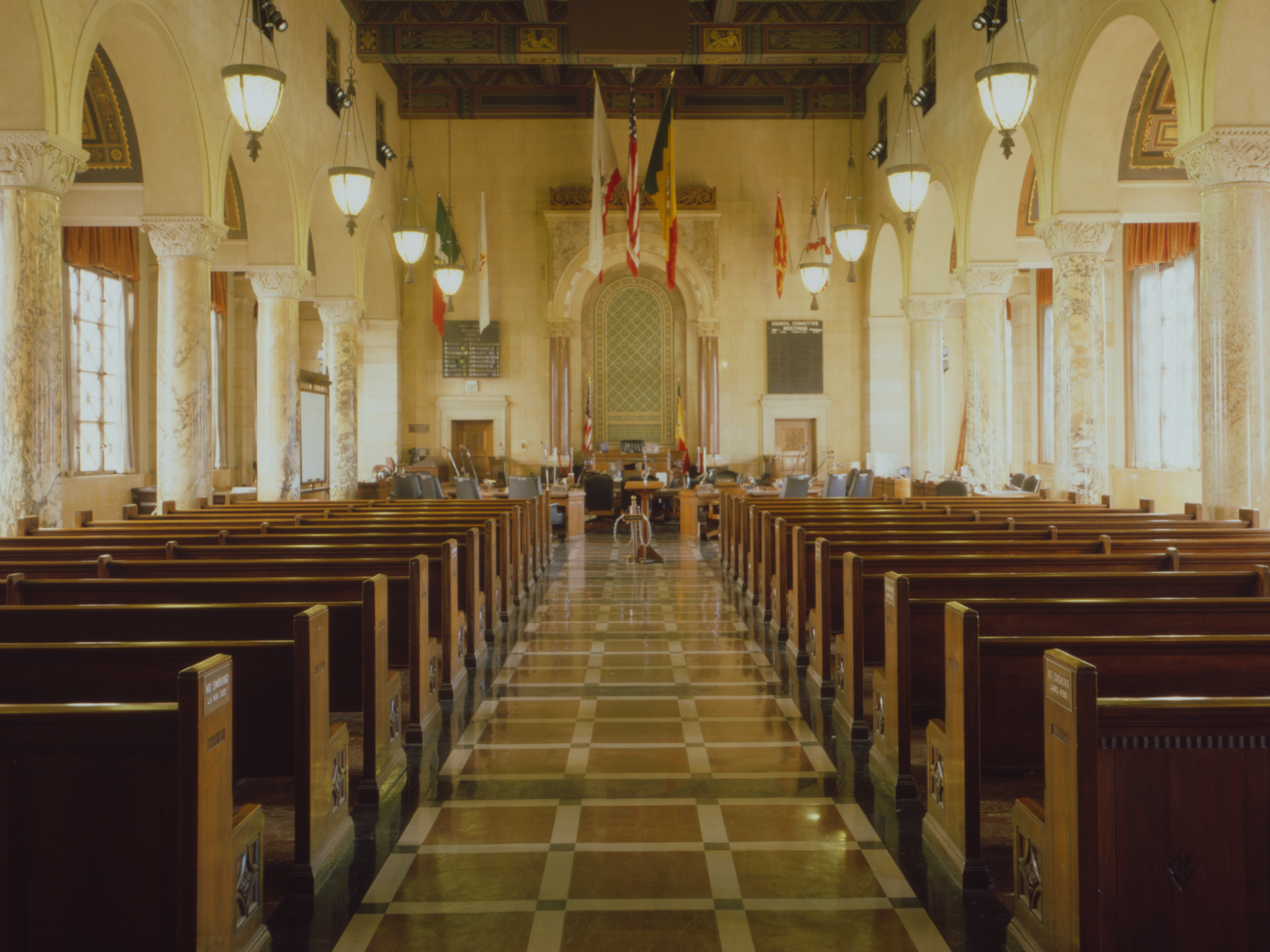
The John Ferraro Council Chamber in 1997.

The Los Angeles City Council is guided by the Los Angeles City Charter. The Charter defines the City Council as the city's legislature, with the Mayor of Los Angeles serving as the executive branch of the city's government creating a strong mayor–council government, though the mayor is weaker than in cities such as New York City. The City Council approves department heads and commissioners picked by the Mayor, amends or approves the Mayor's annual budget, and approve the Mayor's local emergencies to which it reviews afterwards.

The Charter also gives powers for redistricting, as the City Council picks some of the members on the charter commission to advise the council on redistricting but with the City Council having the ability to overrule the commission.

The City Council also has a direct line of communication between it and the 99 local Neighborhood Councils, which serve as advisory groups for the officials.

== History ==
=== Los Angeles Common Council (1850–1889) ===
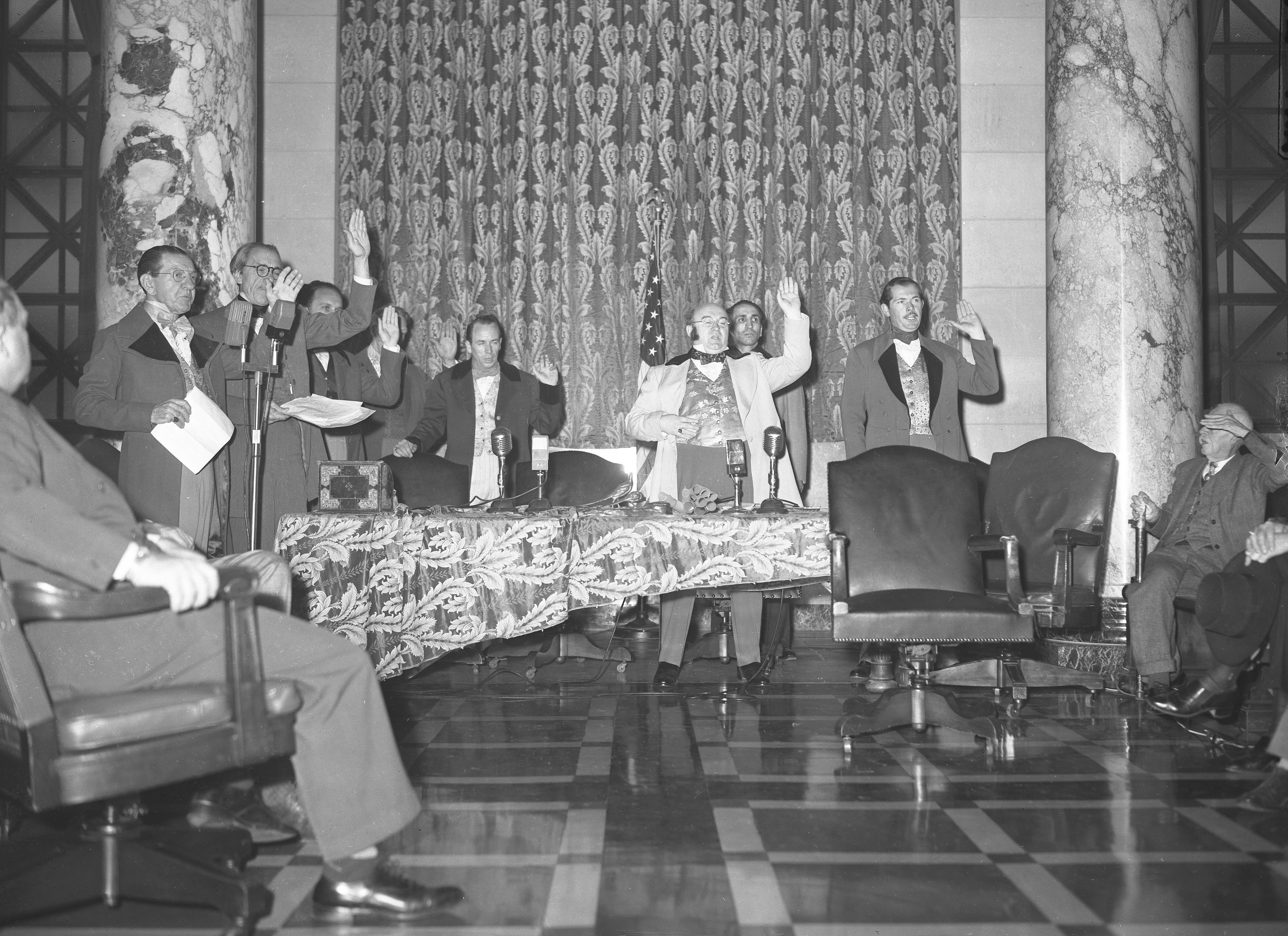
Actors recreating the first meeting of the Los Angeles Common Council in 1948.

Before the incorporation of Los Angeles in 1850, members (regidores) of a municipal council (ayuntamiento) were chosen by the residents of each pueblo since 1812, with the number of regidores being based on the population. By 1835, the new city had four regidores, alongside two Alcaldes (Mayor) and one Síndico Procurador (City Attorney). On April 4, 1850, the Los Angeles Common Council was established alongside the office of Mayor under The Act of Incorporation as the city grew from a remote town of 5,000 residents to a city of 15,000 residents. At its creation, the council had seven seats elected at-large with the members being elected by drawn lots. In 1857, the officials that were elected on May 6 were deposed and the officials from the previous year were reinstated, though they never took office. The council added three seats in 1868.

On July 14, 1870, the council switched to a ward system with three new wards with three seats. The Third ward added a fourth seat in 1871, three years before the First and Second wards added a fourth seat. In 1878, the First and Second wards removed the fourth seat while the third ward removed it in 1881. In 1878, the council created two new wards, the Fourth and Fifth wards, each with three new seats. By the end of the first ward system, the council had fifteen seats.

The councilmembers had various responsibilities for governing the city which included being appointed to committees, which included a school committee which later became the Board of Education for the Los Angeles City School District and later the Los Angeles Unified School District. The office of the President of the Los Angeles City Council was also part of the Council's creation, with the first President being David W. Alexander.

=== Creation of Los Angeles City Council and second ward system (1889–1909) ===
In 1888, voters in Los Angeles passed a new charter that changed the government. The Common Council was now called the City Council and had nine seats for nine new wards. Members were elected to two year terms beginning in 1890, with one member being elected from each of the nine wards by a plurality vote. The change was granted by the California State Legislature, with the first election being in August 1889. The first election under that charter was held on February 21, 1889, and the last on December 4, 1906. Only Austin Conrad Shafer of the 5th ward was re-elected to the new City Council.

During the ward system, the City Council requested the annexation of six parts of the adjacent area: Garvanza, the University area, Colegrove, the shoestring area, Wilmington, and San Pedro.

=== Second at-large system (1909–1925) ===
By 1909, the ward system was leading to corruption within the city council and its elections, and various newspapers suggested that the City Council have ten seats and five at-large seats, resulting in fifteen seats total, or moving to an at-large system. That year, voters replaced the ward system with an at-large system through the Direct Municipal Primary law. They also voted to adjust the party system to have all offices become nonpartisan.

In the first election, candidates were labeled as part of the Good Government Organization, created by political boss Meyer Lissner, or part of the "political machine" with S. P. Yoke, as the city had installed a new nonpartisan election system. In 1923, candidates were either a part of the Municipal Conference, also organized by Lissner, the People's Campaign Committee, the Socialist Party of America, or independent.

In 1915, journalist Estelle Lawton Lindsey was elected to the City Council, being the first female City Councilmember in the City Council just four years after women had voted in municipal elections for the first time. She would be the only woman to serve during this system as well as the only woman to serve in the City Council until the election of Rosalind Wiener Wyman in 1953.

=== Creation of fifteen-member council (1925–2000) ===
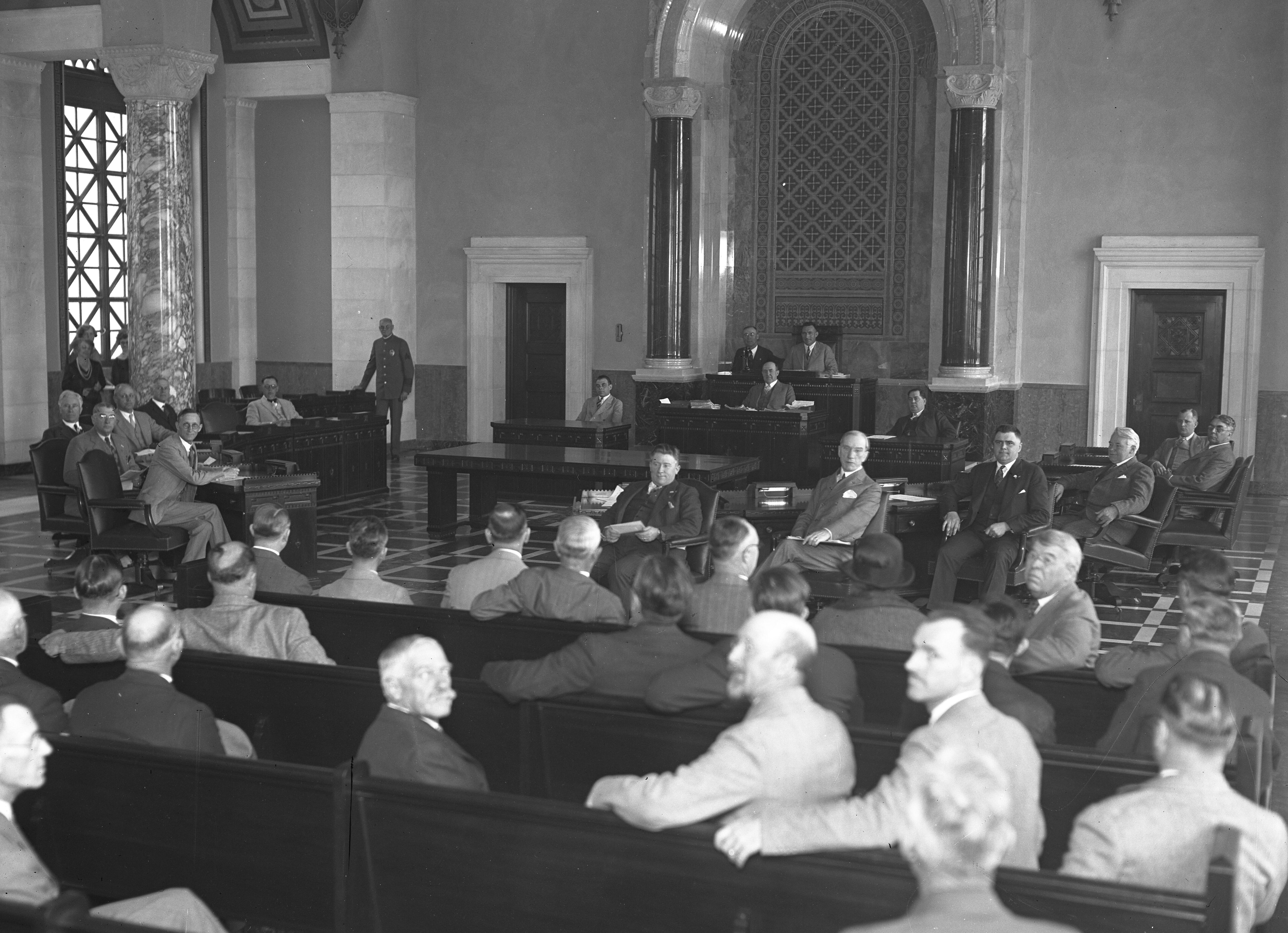
A City Council meeting in session in the new City Hall, 1928.

On July 1, 1925, Los Angeles voters passed a new city charter and replaced the at-large system with a district system with fifteen new single-member districts. Each district was to be approximately equal in population, based upon the voting in the 1922 California gubernatorial election, and would redistrict every four years. The numbering system established for the City Council districts began with the 1st district in the San Fernando Valley and ended with the 15th district in the Los Angeles Harbor Region. In 1928, the new Los Angeles City Hall was completed, and the City Council moved to a room there from the previous Romanesque Revival building used.

By 1986, the City Council was under a court ruling to redistrict itself to provide more representation for Latinos in the city. On August 12, 1986, Councilman Howard Finn died, leaving the 1st district vacant, and the City Council and residents debated how the districts would be redrawn. The City Council voted to have the 1st district drawn to be northwest and north of Downtown Los Angeles while the 2nd district, represented by Joel Wachs, was placed in the Sunland-Tujunga and Van Nuys areas. In 1993, voters approved the adoption of term limits for the City Council, with the new limits being eight years of elected service.

After the creation of the fifteen-member council, politicians who were not white men increasingly were elected to it. On July 1, 1949, Edward R. Roybal became the first Latino American elected to the City Council. On January 28, 1963, Gilbert W. Lindsay became the first African-American to serve on the Council, being appointed to serve out Roybal's term after the latter was elected to Congress. On April 16, 1963, the first elected African-American on the Council, Tom Bradley, was sworn in, which also gave the Council a Democratic majority for the first time in recent history. On July 1, 1985, Michael Woo was sworn in, the first Asian American to serve on the Council. On February 3, 1987, Gloria Molina was sworn in as the first Latina elected to the Council.

=== Strong mayor-council system (2000–present) ===
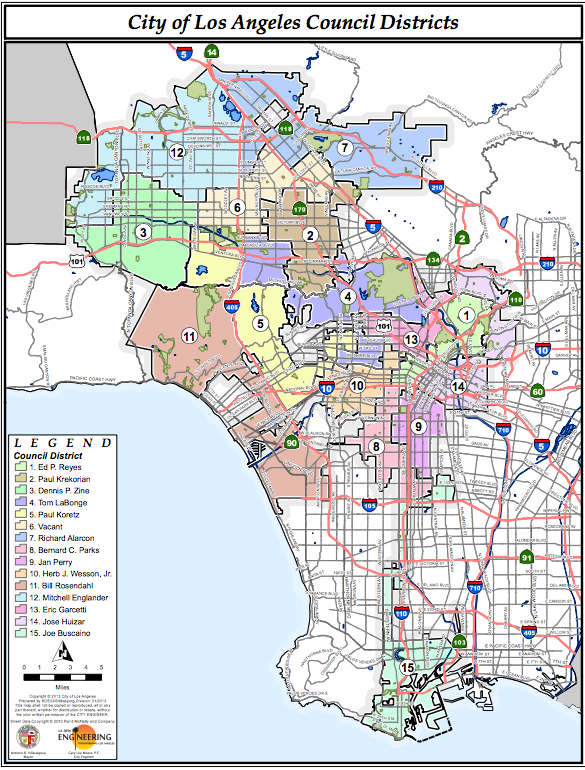
Pre-2020 Redistricting City Council Districts (does not reflect current members)

In 1999, voters approved a new city charter that would go into effect on July 1, 2000. The new charter helped create the Department of Neighborhood Empowerment and helped strengthen the office of Mayor in relation to the City Council. Voters also voted against expanding the city council, remaining with fifteen seats. In 2006, voters approved a ballot measure that changed the term limits from eight years to twelve years.

In 2015, voters in Los Angeles approved a charter amendment to move the election dates from odd-numbered years to even-numbered years, in line with other national elections, in an effort to boost political engagement. Because of the change in dates, officials elected in 2015 or 2017 had their terms extended. In 2022, after a highly publicized scandal involving three City Council members (including Council President Nury Martinez) and the redistricting process, Acting President Mitch O'Farrell introduced a motion that would create a ballot measure in 2024 to expand the Council. In 2023, the first all-female council committee was formed, with the six women on the council forming the committee. In November 2022, the Ad Hoc Committee on City Governance Reform was formed, chaired by the next President Paul Krekorian, to reform the redistricting process.
