= 2022 Los Angeles mayoral election =

- June 7, 2022 (first round); November 8, 2022 (runoff)
- Registered: 2,120,515
- Turnout: 43.86%
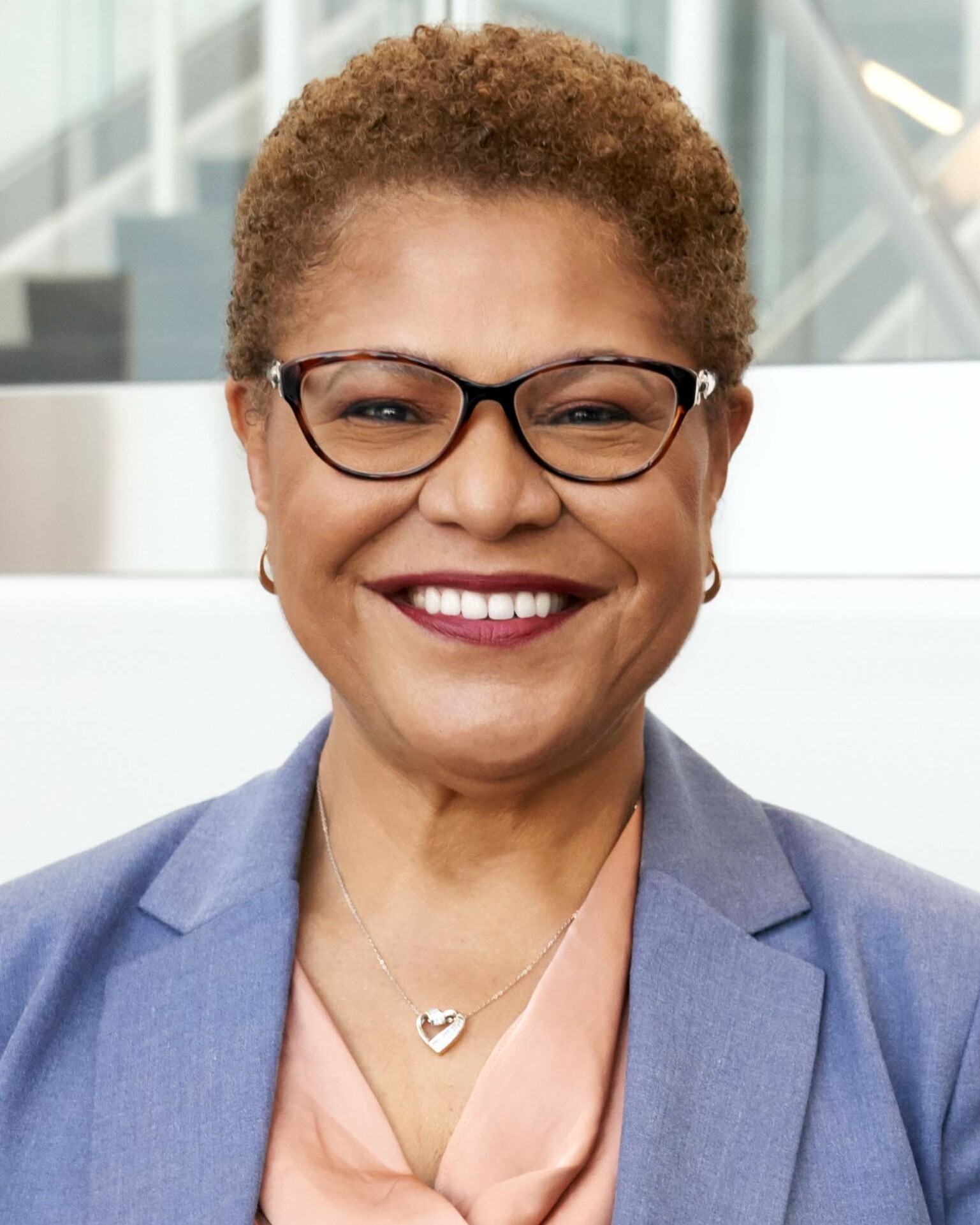

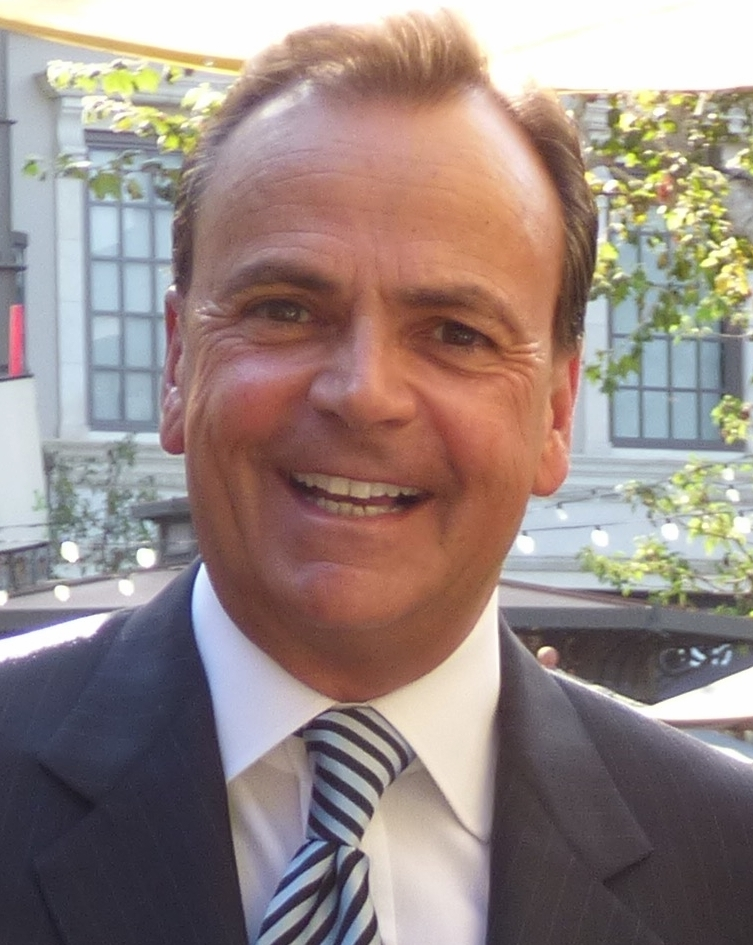

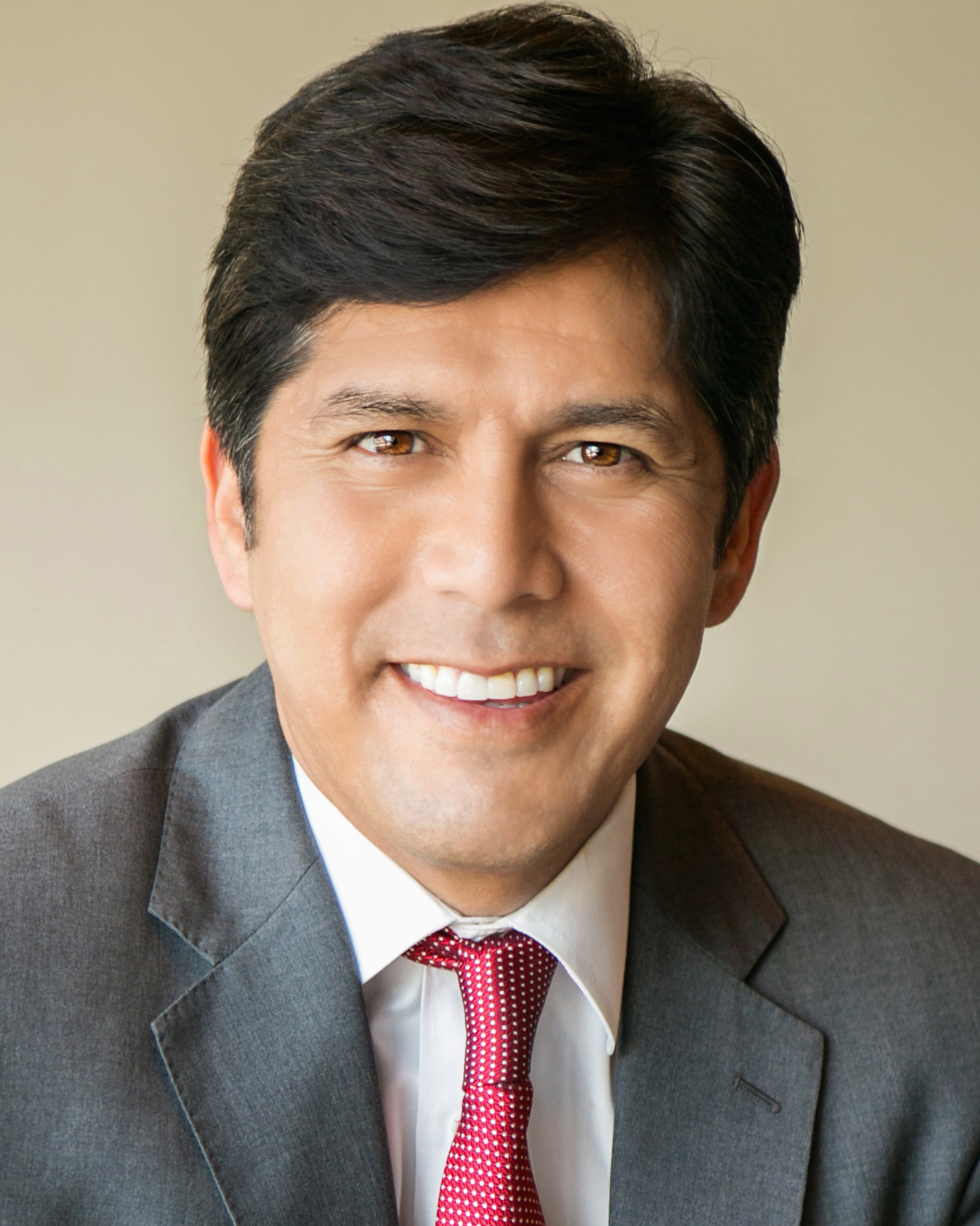

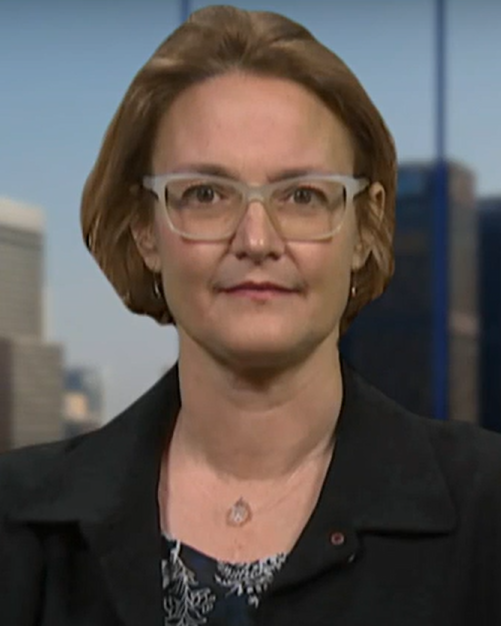
Candidate	Karen Bass	Rick Caruso
First round	278,511; 43.11%	232,490; 35.99%
Runoff	509,944; 54.83%	420,030; 45.17%
Candidate	Kevin de León	Gina Viola
First round	50,372; 7.79%	44,341; 6.86%
Runoff	Eliminated	Eliminated
- Bass: 50–60% 60–70% 70-80% 80-90% >90% Caruso: 50–60% 60–70% 70-80% 80-90% >90%
Mayor before election
Eric Garcetti
Elected Mayor
Karen Bass

The 2022 Los Angeles mayoral election was held on November 8, 2022, to elect the mayor of Los Angeles, California. A top-two primary was held on June 7, 2022. Candidates could win the election outright by receiving more than 50% of the vote, but no candidate received a majority. More than forty candidates formed committees to run. Twenty-seven filed their declaration of intention to collect signatures for the ballot, and of these, twelve qualified. There were a total of 2,120,515 registered voters within the city of Los Angeles. The election was nonpartisan, as are all local elections in California.

Incumbent Mayor Eric Garcetti was ineligible to seek a third term due to term limits, but was serving an extended second term due to a law moving election dates from an "off-year election" to a midterm and statewide election year. In July 2021, Garcetti was nominated to become U.S. ambassador to India. If Garcetti left office before his mayoral term ended, the Los Angeles City Council would have appointed an interim replacement to finish the remainder of that term. This nomination was stalled in the Senate, leaving Garcetti to finish his term. U.S. Representative Karen Bass and real estate developer Rick Caruso advanced to the general election. On November 16, Bass was declared the winner.

== Candidates ==
=== Advanced to general election ===
- Karen Bass, U.S. representative from California's 37th congressional district and former speaker of the California State Assembly
- Rick Caruso, CEO of Caruso Affiliated, developer of The Grove at Farmers Market and The Americana at Brand, president of the University of Southern California board of trustees, former president of the Los Angeles Board of Police Commissioners, and former member of the Los Angeles Board of Water and Power and the Los Angeles Coliseum Commission

=== Eliminated in primary ===
- Kevin de León, city councilmember from the 14th district, candidate for the US Senate in 2018 and former President pro tempore of the California State Senate
- Craig Greiwe, business executive
- Alex Gruenenfelder Smith, Echo Park neighborhood councilman
- John "Jsamuel" Jackson, business owner
- Andrew Kim, lawyer
- Gina Viola, community organizer/activist
- Mel Wilson, real estate agent and former Metro board member

=== Disqualified ===
- Louis De Barraicua, teacher and self-described homeless advocate
- Barry "Boenvilla" Boen, CEO of SilentRight
- Chuck Cho
- YJ Draiman, former Northridge East Neighborhood councilmember and father of David Draiman
- Austin Dragon, veteran and education advocate
- Sean Enright, construction worker
- Jesse N. Forte, self-described astronaut
- Chris Gilmore, business owner
- Jesseca Harvey, business administrative consultant
- Evan Jasek, web developer
- G. Juan Johnson, housing advocate (write-in)
- Juanita Lopez, businesswoman
- Alicia Tashaunna Lowery, children's social worker
- Asher Luzzatto, developer
- William "Rodriguez" Morrison, community organizer and perennial candidate (write-in)
- Jemiss Nazar, chiropractor
- Vincent "King Spider-D" Willis, community activist

=== Withdrawn ===
- Joe Buscaino, city councilmember from the 15th district and former LAPD officer (remained on ballot; endorsed Caruso)
- Mike Feuer, Los Angeles city attorney and former state assemblyman from the 42nd district (remained on ballot; endorsed Bass)
- Jessica Lall, business executive (endorsed Caruso)
- Helan Mahmood, co-founder of fashion brand Don Kaka
- Joseph May, urban designer, artist, and entrepreneur
- Ramit Varma, co-founder of Revolution Prep (remained on ballot; endorsed Caruso)

=== Declined ===
- Austin Beutner, former superintendent of the Los Angeles Unified School District and 2013 mayoral candidate
- Mike Bonin, city councilmember from the 11th district
- Bob Iger, CEO of The Walt Disney Company
- Paul Krekorian, city councilmember from the 2nd district and former state assemblyman from the 43rd district
- Steve Lopez, journalist
- Nury Martinez, president of the Los Angeles City Council from the 6th district
- Mark Ridley-Thomas, suspended city councilmember from the 10th district and former Los Angeles County supervisor

== Primary ==
=== Campaign ===
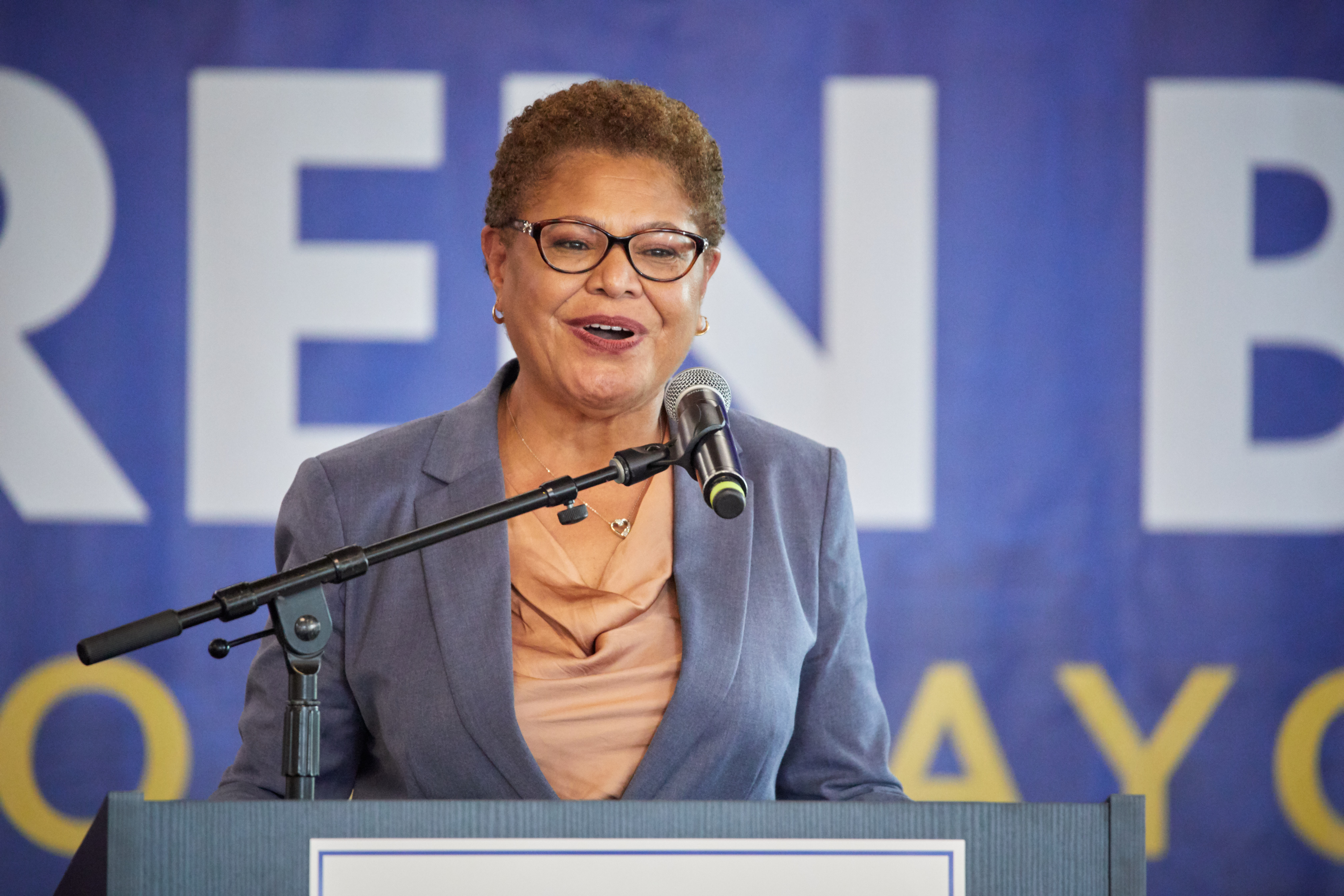
Bass launching her bid for mayor at LATTC, 2021

With an open race for mayor, Karen Bass announced that she would retire from Congress and run for Los Angeles mayor. Bass was widely seen as the favorite frontrunner, with other moderates and progressives polling much lower and divided amongst themselves. The wide lead led to speculation that Bass would have been able to avoid a runoff altogether. Real estate developer Rick Caruso had announced that he would run after speculation in past races and polled in the single digits. However, during the spring of 2022, Caruso saw a surge of support rivaling that of Bass.

As the primary neared, many prominent candidates dropped out and endorsed the two frontrunners, Bass representing the progressive element of the race and Caruso representing the moderate element. This had been shown with two former mayoral candidates: Joe Buscaino, a city councilmember, endorsed Caruso, and Mike Feuer, the Los Angeles city attorney, endorsed Bass. Councilmember Kevin de León also had significant support but lagged behind Bass and Caruso, and ultimately did not advance to the general election.

=== Debates ===
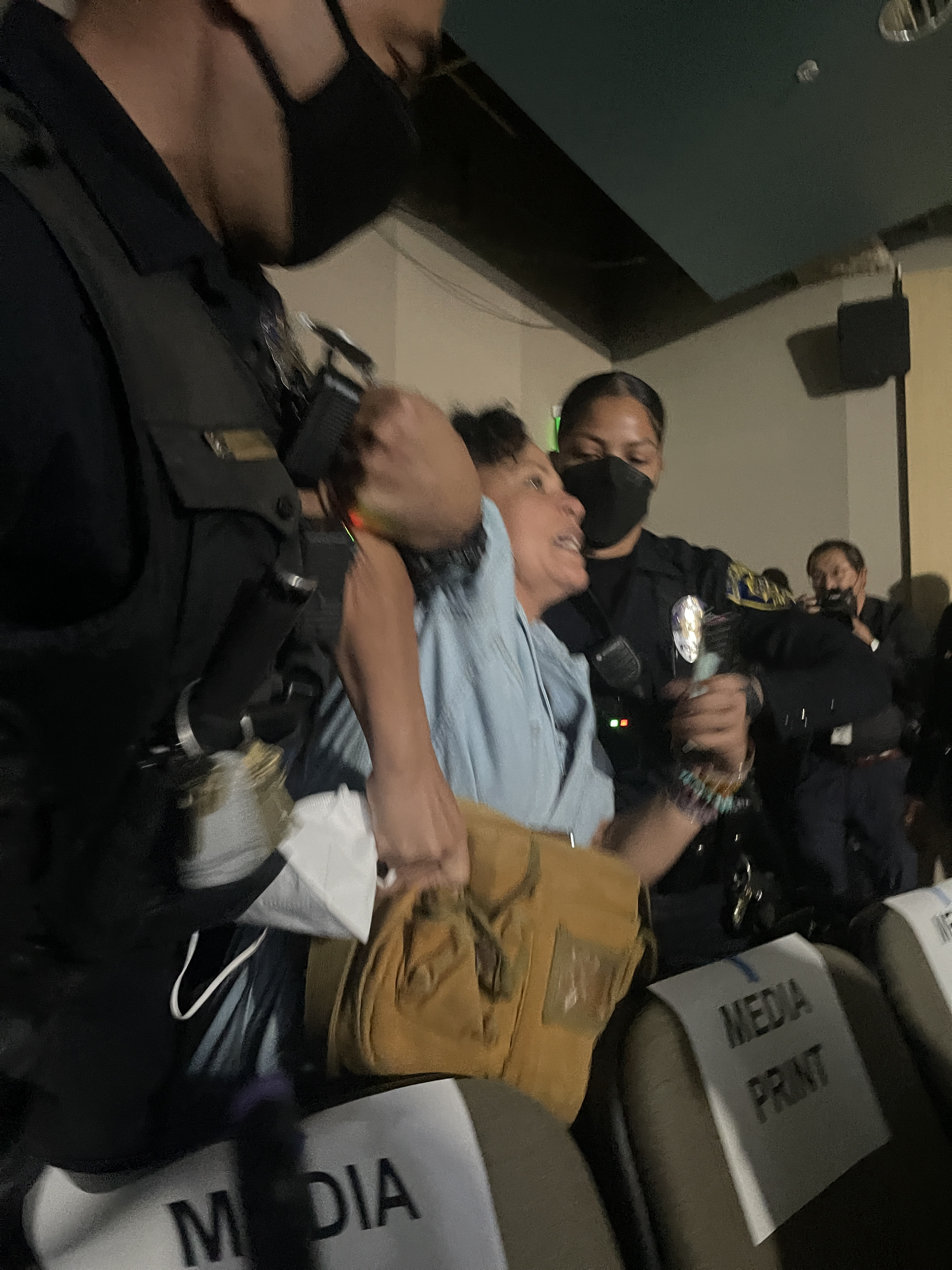
Melina Abdullah being removed from a mayoral election debate

On December 12, 2021, the Stonewall Democratic Club hosted a forum with candidates Bass, Feuer, Lall, and Greiwe. Buscaino and de León cancelled last minute due to scheduling conflicts. On February 22, 2022, Loyola Marymount University alongside Spectrum News 1 hosted the first formal debate between candidates, with Caruso absent because of a scheduling issue. During the debate, protesters started heckling them, resulting in them attempting to rush the stage near the end of the debate.

On March 22, 2022, FOX 11 along with the Los Angeles Times hosted a debate at the University of Southern California with Bass, Buscaino, Caruso, de León, and Feuer. Although most of the other candidates attacked Caruso, many people said that Caruso had won the debate.

On April 28, 2022, ABC7 announced that they would be hosting a debate at California State University, Los Angeles with the top five leading candidates. In response to the list, candidates Craig Greiwe, Alex Gruenenfelder Smith, Gina Viola, and Mel Wilson criticized their exclusion at the debates and the organizers. Candidate Ramit Varma later released a statement criticizing his exclusion at debates. During the Sunday debate, police removed Melina Abdullah, a professor at Cal State LA and Black Lives Matter founder, as well as other protesters from the room, as they did not have a tickets to the event.

The issues discussed at the debates were homelessness, the COVID-19 pandemic in the United States, crime, and climate change.

==== Mayoral debates and forums ====
2022 Los Angeles mayoral election primary debates and forums
Date	Host	Moderator(s)	Link	Participants											Ref.
Key: P Participant A Absent N Non-invitee W Withdrew O Not yet entered race															Ref.
Key: P Participant A Absent N Non-invitee W Withdrew O Not yet entered race				Bass	Buscaino	Caruso	de León	Feuer	Greiwe	Gruenenfelder	Lall	Varma	Viola	Wilson	Ref.
December 12, 2021	Stonewall Democrats of California; Minority AIDS Project; National Association of Black Journalists	Jarrett Hill; Tanya McRae	Video	P	A	O	A	P	P	N	P	N	N	N	
February 19, 2022	Heart of Los Angeles; Invest In Youth Coalition	Kelvin Washington	Video	P	P	N	P	P	N	N	W	N	N	N	
February 22, 2022	Loyola Marymount University; Spectrum News 1	Fernando Guerra; Giselle Fernández	Video	P	P	A	P	P	N	N	W	N	N	P	
March 15, 2022	Los Angeles Business Council; Spectrum News 1	Alex Cohen	Video	P	P	A	P	P	N	N	W	N	N	N	
March 21, 2022	Temple Beth Hillel	Erika D. Smith	Video	P	P	N	P	P	N	N	W	N	N	N	
March 22, 2022	FOX 11; University of Southern California; Los Angeles Times	Elex Michaelson; Erika D. Smith	Video	P	P	P	P	P	N	N	W	N	N	N	
March 26, 2022	National Union of Healthcare Workers; Courage California	Sophia Mendoza; Irene Khao	Video	P	N	N	P	P	N	N	W	N	N	N	
April 12, 2022	Los Angeles League of Conservation Voters; ABC7	Josh Haskell	Video	P	N	N	P	P	N	N	W	N	N	P	
April 30, 2022	Asian Americans Advancing Justice - Los Angeles; Koreatown Immigrant Workers Alliance	Andrew Menor		P	P	N	P	P	N	N	W	N	P	N	
May 1, 2022	League of Women Voters; California State University, Los Angeles; ABC7	Marc Brown		P	P	P	P	P	N	N	W	N	N	N	
May 16, 2022	Los Angeles Latino Equity and Diversity Initiative	Gabriel Lerner; Claudia Batera	Video	P	W	A	P	P	N	N	W	N	N	P	
May 18, 2022	University of California, Los Angeles	Bineh Ndefru	Video	N	W	N	N	W	P	P	W	A	P	P	
May 20, 2022	Los Angeles Times; KCRW	Anna Scott; Gustavo Arellano	Video	P	W	A	P	W	N	N	W	N	P	N	
May 24, 2022	ICM Partners; Politico	Jeremy B. White		P	W	A	P	W	N	N	W	W	N	N	

=== Endorsements ===
Joe Buscaino (withdrew and endorsed Caruso)

City councilmembers

- John Lee, member of the Los Angeles City Council for the 12th district
- David Ryu, former member of the Los Angeles City Council for the 4th district

Labor unions

- Los Angeles Airport Peace Officers Association
Kevin de León

U.S. representatives

- Lou Correa, U.S. representative for California's 46th congressional district
- Jimmy Gomez, U.S. representative for California's 34th congressional district
- Norma Torres, U.S. representative for California's 35th congressional district

State assemblymembers

- Sabrina Cervantes, state assemblyman for the 60th Assembly district
- Mike Fong, state assemblyman for the 49th Assembly district
- Warren Furutani, state assemblyman for the 55th Assembly district
- Eduardo Garcia, state assemblyman for the 56th Assembly district
- Bill Quirk, state assemblyman for the 20th Assembly district
- Eloise Reyes, state assemblyman for the 57th Assembly district
- Rudy Salas, state assemblyman for the 31st Assembly district
- Miguel Santiago, state assemblyman for the 53rd Assembly district

State-level offices

- John Chiang, former California state treasurer

State senators

- Maria Elena Durazo, state senator for the 24th district
- Monique Limón, state senator for the 19th district
- Richard Pan, state senator for the 6th district
- Richard Roth, state senator for the 31st district

Individuals

- Grupo Firme, regional Mexican band

Organizations

- Armenian National Committee of America
- Laborers' International Union of North America (LiUNA!) Local 300
- Latino Victory Fund
- SEIU-1021
- Teamsters Joint Council 42
- UNITE HERE Local 11
- United Farm Workers

Newspapers and other media

- La Opinión
Mike Feuer (withdrew and endorsed Bass)

Citywide officials

- Laura Chick, Los Angeles city controller (2001–2009)
Mel Wilson

Los Angeles County officials

- Michael D. Antonovich, former member of the Los Angeles County Board of Supervisors for the 5th district

Karen Bass was endorsed by former President Joe Biden, former Vice President Kamala Harris, former Speaker of the House Nancy Pelosi, and former President Barack Obama.

=== Polling ===
Graphical summary

Poll source	Date(s) administered	Sample size (Note: Key: A – all adults RV – registered voters LV – likely voters V – unclear)	Margin of error	Karen Bass	Joe Buscaino	Rick Caruso	Kevin de León	Mike Feuer	Other	Undecided
Berkeley IGS	May 24–31, 2022	1,204 (RV)	± 2.9%	25%	0%	23%	6%	3%	8% (Note: Viola with 4%; Gruenenfelder Smith with 2%; Kim and Varma with 1%; Greiwe, Jackson, and Wilson with 0%)	35%
Berkeley IGS	May 24–31, 2022	816 (LV)	± 3.5%	38%	1%	32%	6%	3%	4% (Note: Gruenenfelder Smith and Viola with 2%; Greiwe, Jackson, Kim, Varma, and Wilson with 0%)	15%
	May 24, 2022	Varma drops out and endorses Caruso								
	May 17, 2022	Feuer drops out and endorses Bass								
FM3 Research (D) (Note: This poll was sponsored by the IE committee Communities United for Karen Bass)	May 13–17, 2022	798 (LV)	± 3.1%	35%	1%	37%	6%	6%	6%	10%
David Binder Research (D) (Note: This poll was sponsored by Bass's campaign)	May 12–16, 2022	500 (LV)	± 4.4%	34%	–	32%	7%	–	5%	17%
	May 12, 2022	Buscaino drops out and endorses Caruso								
EVITARUS (D)	May 2022	– (LV)	–	30%	2%	28%	–	3%	–	–
Berkeley IGS	March 29 – April 5, 2022	1,380 (LV)	± 3.5%	23%	1%	24%	6%	2%	6% (Note: Viola with 2%; Gruenenfelder Smith, Kim, and Varma with 1%; Greiwe, Jackson, Wilson, and "Other (write-in candidate)" with <1%)	39%
Berkeley IGS	February 3–10, 2022	1,446 (LV)	± 4.0%	32%	4%	8%	8%	4%	4% (Note: Lall with 2%; Varma and Wilson with 1%)	40%
Loyola Marymount University	January 4 – February 10, 2022	1,000 (A)	± 3.1%	14%	7%	6%	12%	6%	9% (Note: Wilson with 4%; Lall with 3%; Varma with 2%)	46%
Loyola Marymount University	January 4 – February 10, 2022	815 (RV)	± 3.4%	16%	8%	6%	12%	7%	10%	42%
	February 8, 2022	Lall drops out								
	September 16, 2021	Martinez announces she will not run								
	August 16, 2021	Ridley-Thomas announces he will not run and endorses Bass								
FM3 Research (D)	July 29 – August 5, 2021	803 (LV)	± 3.5%	22%	5%	6%	6%	4%	12% (Note: Martinez and Ridley-Thomas with 6%)	45%

=== Results ===
Results map by precinct (Interactive version) Bass: 20–30%; 30–40%; 40–50%; 50–60%; 60–70%; 70–80%; 80–90%; >90%; Caruso: 20–30%; 30–40%; 40–50%; 50–60%; 60–70%; 70–80%; 80–90%; >90%; de León: 20–30%; 30–40%; 40–50%; >50%; Others: No votes; Other candidates; Tie

2022 Los Angeles mayoral primary election
Candidate	Votes	%
Karen Bass	278,511	43.11
Rick Caruso	232,490	35.99
Kevin de León	50,372	7.79
Gina Viola	44,341	6.86
Mike Feuer (withdrawn)	12,087	1.87
Andrew Kim	9,405	1.46
Alex Gruenenfelder Smith	6,153	0.95
Joe Buscaino (withdrawn)	4,485	0.69
Craig Greiwe	2,439	0.38
Mel Wilson	2,336	0.36
Ramit Varma (withdrawn)	1,916	0.30
John "Jsamuel" Jackson	1,511	0.23
Total votes	646,058	100.00

== Runoff ==
=== Debates ===
2022 Los Angeles mayoral election debates
No.	Date	Host	Moderator	Link	Participants	
Key: P Participant A Absent N Non-invitee I Invitee W Withdrawn						
Key: P Participant A Absent N Non-invitee I Invitee W Withdrawn					Karen Bass	Rick Caruso
1	Sept. 21, 2022	Los Angeles Times	Elex Michelson, Erika Smith, Gabriela Teissier	Video	**P**	**P**
2	Oct. 6, 2022	KNX	Charles Feldman, Mike Simpson	Video	**P**	**P**
3	Oct. 11, 2022	NBC4 and Telemundo52	Conan Nolan, Colleen Williams, Dunia Elvir	Video	**P**	**P**

=== Endorsements ===
Endorsements in bold were made after the primary election.

Karen Bass

Federal officials

- **Joe Biden**, 46th president of the United States, 47th vice president of the United States and former U.S. senator from Delaware
- **Hillary Clinton**, former U.S. secretary of state, former U.S. senator from New York, and former First Lady of the United States
- **Kamala Harris**, 49th vice president of the United States, former U.S. senator from California and former attorney general of California
- **Barack Obama**, 44th president of the United States and former U.S. senator from Illinois

U.S. senators

- Cory Booker, U.S. senator for New Jersey
- Barbara Boxer, former U.S. senator for California
- **Alex Padilla**, U.S. senator for California
- **Bernie Sanders**, U.S. senator for Vermont
- **Elizabeth Warren**, U.S. senator for Massachusetts

U.S. representatives

- Pete Aguilar, U.S. representative for California's 31st congressional district
- Howard Berman, former U.S. representative for California's 28th congressional district
- Yvonne Brathwaite Burke, former U.S. representative, former member of the Los Angeles County Board of Supervisors and member of the Amtrak Board of Directors
- **Tony Cárdenas**, U.S. representative for California's 29th congressional district
- Judy Chu, U.S. representative for California's 27th congressional district
- James Clyburn, United States House of Representatives House majority whip
- **Jimmy Gomez**, U.S. representative for California's 34th congressional district
- **Steny Hoyer**, United States House of Representatives House majority leader
- Mike Levin, U.S. representative for California's 49th congressional district
- Mel Levine, former U.S. representative for California's 27th congressional district
- Ted Lieu, U.S. representative for California's 33rd congressional district
- Alan Lowenthal, U.S. representative for California's 47th congressional district
- Nancy Pelosi, speaker of the United States House of Representatives
- Katie Porter, U.S. representative for California's 45th congressional district
- Lucille Roybal-Allard, U.S. representative for California's 40th congressional district
- Adam Schiff, U.S. representative for California's 28th congressional district
- **Norma Torres**, U.S. representative for California's 35th congressional district
- Juan Vargas, U.S. representative for California's 51st congressional district
- Diane Watson, former U.S. representative for California's 31st congressional district (2003–2011)
- Henry Waxman, former U.S. representative for California's 33rd congressional district

Statewide officials

- **Rob Bonta**, 34th attorney general of California
- **Gray Davis**, 37th governor of California
- Eleni Kounalakis, 50th lieutenant governor of California
- **Shirley Weber**, 31st secretary of state of California

State senators

- Steven Bradford, state senator for the 35th district
- **María Elena Durazo**, state senator for the 24th district
- Sydney Kamlager, state senator for the 30th district

State assemblymembers

- Isaac Bryan, state assemblyman for the 54th Assembly district
- Autumn Burke, former state assemblywoman for the 62nd Assembly district (2014–2022)
- Mike Gipson, state assemblyman for the 64th Assembly district
- Chris Holden, state assemblyman for the 41st Assembly district
- Reggie Jones-Sawyer, state assemblyman for the 59th Assembly district
- Bonnie Lowenthal, former state assemblywoman (2008–2014)
- John Pérez, 68th speaker of the California State Assembly (2010–2014)
- Anthony Rendon, speaker of the California State Assembly
- **Luz Rivas**, state assemblywoman for the 39th Assembly district
- **Henry Stern**, state assemblyman for the 27th Assembly district

Mayors

- Antonio Villaraigosa, former mayor of Los Angeles

Citywide officials

- Mike Feuer, Los Angeles city attorney and former mayoral candidate

City councilmembers

- **Bob Blumenfield**, member of the Los Angeles City Council for the 3rd district
- Mike Bonin, member of the Los Angeles City Council for the 11th district
- Jackie Goldberg, former member of the Los Angeles City Council for the 13th district and LAUSD Board member
- Marqueece Harris-Dawson, member of the Los Angeles City Council for the 8th district
- **Nury Martinez**, former president of the Los Angeles City Council
- Curren Price, member of the Los Angeles City Council for the 9th district
- Nithya Raman, member of the Los Angeles City Council for the 4th district
- Mark Ridley-Thomas, suspended member of the Los Angeles City Council for the 10th district
- Rosalind Wiener Wyman, former member of the Los Angeles City Council for the 5th district

Los Angeles County officials

- Sheila Kuehl, member of the Los Angeles County Board of Supervisors for the 3rd district
- Holly Mitchell, member of the Los Angeles County Board of Supervisors for the 2nd district
- **Hilda Solis**, member of the Los Angeles County Board of Supervisors for the 1st district

Individuals

- J. J. Abrams, filmmaker
- Patricia Arquette, actress and activist
- Sharon Brous, rabbi
- Yvette Nicole Brown, actress, comedian and writer
- Jackson Browne, musician and activist
- Kate Capshaw, artist
- **Cedric the Entertainer**, actor and stand-up comedian
- Common, actor and rapper from Chicago
- **Rosario Dawson**, actress
- **Colman Domingo**, actor, writer, and director
- Michael Eisner, former CEO of The Walt Disney Company
- **America Ferrera**, actress
- Jane Fonda, actress and activist
- Ari Emanuel, CEO of Endeavor
- Jennifer Garner, actress
- Donald Glover, rapper and actor
- Roger Goodell, 6th commissioner of the National Football League (2006–present)
- Kim Gordon, artist and musician
- Ariana Grande, musician and actress
- Kathy Griffin, actress and comedian
- **Chelsea Handler**, comedian and actress
- Christy Haubegger, founder of Latina magazine
- Dolores Huerta, labor leader and civil rights activist
- Samuel L. Jackson, actor and producer
- Ken Jeong, comedian, actor and licensed physician
- Magic Johnson, former professional basketball player
- Jeffrey Katzenberg, film producer and media proprietor
- Mina Kimes, investigative journalist
- Norman Lear, writer and producer
- Damon Lindelof, screenwriter and producer
- Shonda Rhimes, television producer, screenwriter and author
- Tracee Ellis Ross, actress, TV producer and former model
- Nina Shaw, attorney
- Steve Soboroff, Los Angeles Police commissioner and commercial real-estate developer
- Octavia Spencer, actress
- Steven Spielberg, film director
- **Danny Trejo**, actor
- **Kerry Washington**, actress, producer, and director

Organizations

- **Armenian National Committee of America**
- EMILY's List
- National Union of Healthcare Workers
- Stonewall Democrats
- **Teamsters Joint Council 42**
- **United Food and Commercial Workers Local 770**
- United Teachers Los Angeles
- Working Families Party

Newspapers and other media

- The Korea Times
- Los Angeles Times
Rick Caruso

Mayors

- Richard Riordan, former mayor of Los Angeles

City councilmembers

- Joe Buscaino, member of the Los Angeles City Council for the 15th district and former mayoral candidate
- **Gil Cedillo**, member of the Los Angeles City Council for the 1st district
- **John Lee**, member of the Los Angeles City Council for the 12th district

Police chiefs

- Charlie Beck, former chief of the Los Angeles Police Department
- William Bratton, former chief of the Los Angeles Police Department, New York City Police Commissioner, and Boston Police Department commissioner

Individuals

- Adam Aron, businessman, CEO of AMC Theatres
- Clarence Avant, music executive, entrepreneur, and film producer
- Sean Bailey, president of Walt Disney Studios Motion Picture Production
- Scooter Braun, record executive
- **Kate del Castillo**, actress
- Snoop Dogg, rapper
- **Josh Flagg**, real estate agent, television personality, and author
- Sweet Alice Harris, community organizer
- Olivia Jade, YouTuber and daughter of Mossimo Giannulli
- Kris Jenner, media personality
- Kim Kardashian, socialite, model, and businesswoman
- George Lopez, actor and comedian
- Bryan Lourd, talent agent
- **Katharine McPhee**, singer-songwriter and actress
- Elon Musk, businessman, CEO of Tesla and SpaceX
- Gwyneth Paltrow, actress and businesswoman
- Katy Perry, singer-songwriter
- **Chris Pratt**, actor
- Wolfgang Puck, chef and restaurateur
- Ted Sarandos, businessman and co-CEO of Netflix
- Maria Shriver, journalist, author, and former First Lady of California
- Evan Spiegel, co-founder and CEO of Snap Inc.
- Jay Sures, co-president of the United Talent Agency
- **Cenk Uygur**, co-founder, CEO, and host of The Young Turks, co-founder of Justice Democrats, founder of Wolf PAC, and candidate for California's 25th congressional district in 2020
- Dana Walden, businesswoman, chairwoman of Walt Disney Television

Police unions

- Los Angeles Police Protective League

Newspapers and other media

- Los Angeles Daily News
- Pasadena Star-News

Organizations

- International Brotherhood of Electrical Workers Local 11

Foreign politicians

- **Mark Leviste**, vice governor of Batangas, Philippines
Declined to endorse

State officials

- Gavin Newsom, governor of California

=== Polling ===
Graphical summary

Poll source	Date(s) administered	Sample size	Margin of error	Karen Bass	Rick Caruso	Undecided
UC Berkeley IGS	October 25–31, 2022	1,131 (LV)	± 4%	**45%**	41%	13%
J. Wallin Opinion Research	October 15–17, 2022	400 (LV)	± 4.9%	37%	**40%**	24%
UC Berkeley IGS	September 22–26, 2022	1,349 (LV)	± 4.0%	**46%**	31%	23%
UC Berkeley IGS	September 22–26, 2022	1,688 (RV)	± 3.5%	**34%**	31%	31%
Probolsky Research	September 19–25, 2022	500 (LV)	± 4.5%	**48%**	42%	10%
Global Strategy Group	August 2022	– (LV)	–	**43%**	37%	20%
FM3 Research (D)	August 2022	– (LV)	–	**49%**	38%	13%
UC Berkeley IGS	August 9–15, 2022	1,746 (RV)	± 2.5%	**43%**	31%	24%
UC Berkeley IGS	August 9–15, 2022	1,212 (LV)	± 3.0%	**53%**	32%	14%
UC Berkeley IGS	May 24–31, 2022	1,204 (RV)	± 2.9%	**37%**	33%	30%
UC Berkeley IGS	May 24–31, 2022	816 (LV)	± 3.5%	**49%**	35%	16%
FM3 Research (D)	May 13–17, 2022	798 (LV)	± 3.1%	**48%**	39%	13%

=== Results ===
2022 Los Angeles mayoral runoff election
Candidate	Votes	%
**Karen Bass**	**509,944**	**54.83%**
Rick Caruso	420,030	45.17%
Total votes	**929,974**	**100.00**

== See also ==
- 2022 California elections
  - 2022 California gubernatorial election
  - 2022 United States Senate election in California
- 2022 Los Angeles elections
