= Carvell Wallace =

American author

- Born: October 20, 1974; McKeesport, Pennsylvania
- Occupations: Author, writer, and podcaster

Carvell Wallace (born October 20, 1974, in McKeesport, Pennsylvania) is a New York Times bestselling author, writer, and podcaster. He is a regular contributor to Pitchfork, the Huffington Post, and Slate, and has written for The New York Times, New York Magazine, GQ, The Toast, The Guardian, The New Yorker, Esquire, Quartz, ESPN, and other publications. He is the creator and host of Finding Fred, an iHeartMedia documentary podcast about the life of Fred Rogers; host of Closer Than They Appear, an Al Jazeera podcast about race and identity in America; and co-host of Mom & Dad Are Fighting, a Slate parenting podcast. He is co-writer of the Slate parenting advice column, Care & Feeding. In 2019, he helped create the Sundance Institute exhibition Still Here, an immersive multimedia installation about mass incarceration, erasure, and gentrification in Harlem, New York.

== Early life and education ==
Wallace was raised by a working-class single mother in McKeesport, Pennsylvania.

Wallace graduated from Los Angeles County High School for the Arts and was admitted to New York University's Tisch School of Arts conservatory program. He graduated from the university with a Bachelor of Fine Arts in Theatre in 1997.

== Career ==
Starting in 1997, Wallace spent 15 years designing and running programs for incarcerated, foster, and at-risk youth in New York City and San Francisco. One of his projects involved designing an education intake and assessment model for youth released from Rikers Island. Another project entailed the redesign and expansion of an organic farming employment program for middle school-aged youth in the Bayview–Hunters Point neighborhood. He was also tasked with creating a reentry to society program for youth from San Francisco County who were exiting long-term incarceration. He also wrote the curriculum and ran the pilot for a career training program for youth leaving foster care in several California counties. In 2003, he created and taught a course for middle school-aged black youth which combined history with behavior modification and social skills development. He subsequently spent seven years as at Revolution Prep in Santa Monica, California.

During this time, Wallace co-founded Flourish Agenda, whose mission included outreach to "black youth in schools and community organizations to help overcome racial trauma and provide tools that are necessary for success." Also during this period, Wallace co-created the Vibosity app, was a speaker at Alterconf San Francisco as well as the San Francisco Tech Inclusion Conference, and was named one of Echoing Green's Black Male Achievement Fellows.

Wallace's writings began to appear in outlets such as The Toast in 2016, for which he wrote the in-depth history piece "The Negro Motorist Green Book and Black America's Perpetual Search For A Home". The same year, he wrote a profile of basketball player Steph Curry, his first profile, which was published in The New Yorker. Starting in February 2016, he spent a year and six months as an MTV News Music Desk columnist, writing on subjects ranging from Prince, John Coltrane, and Aaliyah, to Bernie Worrell, De La Soul, G-Eazy, and Meghan Trainor.

In 2017, Wallace wrote GQ's cover story on Mahershala Ali. That year, he also teamed up with Al Jazeera to start the Closer Than They Appear podcast, an exploration of race and identity in America. The podcast went on to win a Kaleidoscope Award from the Radio Television Digital News Association.

In 2018, Wallace wrote Viola Davis's Woman of the Year piece for Glamour. He also wrote "Obama's Parting Gift", a story about the end of the presidency of Barack Obama for The New Yorker, which earned a spot in 2018's Best American Essays. The same year, Closer Than They Appear received a favorable review from the Podcast Review.

On March 12, 2019, Esquire published Wallace's "Samuel L. Jackson Operates Like He Owns the Place. (He Does.)" as their cover story. Also in 2019, Wallace helped the Golden State Warriors' Andre Iguodala write the book The Sixth Man: A Memoir, which ranked as a New York Times bestseller. In June 2019, the Los Angeles Times placed The Sixth Man on their list "7 buzzworthy June books to look out for." Wallace also created Finding Fred, an iHeart Media documentary podcast about the life of Fred Rogers, which was named the #1 Podcast of 2019 by The Atlantic. Finding Fred was voted one of the Best of 2019 by CBC Podcasts, the podcast branch of the Canadian Broadcasting Corporation.

== Awards ==
- Echoing Green Black Male Achievement Fellowship (2015)
- Radio Television Digital News Association Kaleidoscope Award in Network Television for Closer Than They Appear episode "Why Me?" (2018)
- American Mosaic Journalism Prize (2023) for "What if My Mother Had An Abortion"
- PEN Oakland/Josephine Miles Literary Award for Another Word for Love (2025)
- Whiting Award in Nonfiction (2026)

== Personal life ==
Wallace struggled with drugs and alcohol in his 20s and 30s; alcoholism runs in his family.

Wallace has a son, born in 2002, and a daughter, born in 2006.

== Podcasts ==
| Date(s) | Show | Episode | Role |
|---|---|---|---|
| March 30, 2017–May 30, 2019 | Mom and Dad Are Fighting | Series: "Sperm In Top Hats Edition" to "Pollen Prank Edition" | Co-host |
| October 31, 2017–May 14, 2018 | Closer Than They Appear, Al Jazeera Media Network | Series | Host |
| January 4, 2019 | On Point, 90.9 WBUR | "Do Moms And Dads Know What They're Doing? A Closer Look At Parenting Advice" | Guest |
| October 23, 2019 | Longform | "Carvell Wallace" | Guest |
| November 15, 2019–December 24, 2019 | Finding Fred, iHeartRadio | Series | Host |
| November 22, 2019 | It's Been a Minute with Sam Sanders, NPR | "Weekly Wrap: Dems Debate, Mister Rogers and WeWork" | Guest |
| November 29, 2019 | One Bad Mother, Maximum Fun | "Episode 330: Sunday Sunday, Oh Sh*t Tomorrow's Monday! Plus, Carvell Wallace on Parenting and Fred Rogers" | Guest |
