= 2020 Los Angeles elections =

- March 3, 2020; November 3, 2020

7 out of 15 seats in the City Council 8 seats needed for a majority
	Majority party	Minority party	Third party
Party	Democratic	Independent	Republican
Seats before	14	0	1
Seats won	6	1	0
Seats after	14	1	0
Seat change	Steady	▲1	▼1

4 out of 7 seats in the LAUSD Board of Education 4 seats needed for a majority
	Majority party	Minority party	Third party
Party	Democratic	Republican	Independent
Seats before	6	1	0
Seats won	3	1	0
Seats after	6	1	0
Seat change	Steady	Steady	Steady

The 2020 Los Angeles elections were held on March 3, 2020. Voters elected candidates in a nonpartisan primary, with runoff elections scheduled for November 3, 2020. Seven of the 15 seats in the City Council were up for election.

This was the first election held in the city that correlated with recent changes in election laws, which moved elections from being held on off-years to even-numbered years to correlate with federal and state elections.

Municipal elections in California are officially nonpartisan; candidates' party affiliations do not appear on the ballot.

== City council ==
=== District 2 ===
2020 Los Angeles City Council District 2 election
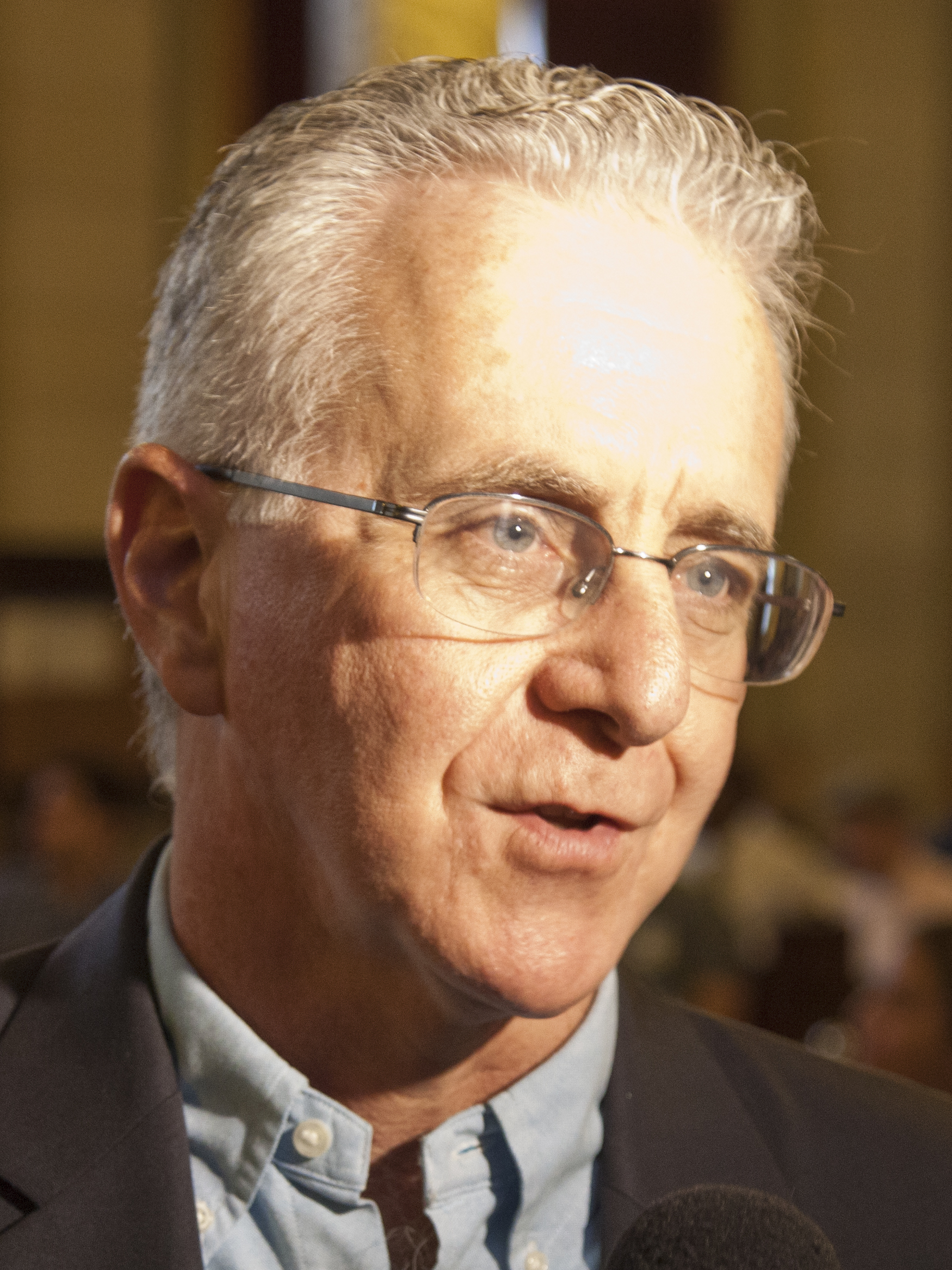

Candidate	Paul Krekorian	Rudy Melendez	Ayinde Jones
Popular vote	30,844	9,166	6,248
Percentage	66.68%	19.81%	13.51%
City councilor before election
Paul Krekorian
City councilor after election
Paul Krekorian

==== Candidates ====
- Ayinde Jones, attorney
- Paul Krekorian, incumbent councilmember
- Rudy Melendez, laborer and artist

==== Did not make ballot ====
- Radomir V. Luza, North Hollywood Neighborhood Council Board member
- Eric Preven, writer and producer
- Stacey Jane Slichta
- Adam Summer, Studio City Neighborhood Council Board member

==== Withdrew ====
- Vivianna Dunnigan

==== Results ====
2020 Los Angeles City Council District 2 election
Primary election
Candidate	Votes	%
Paul Krekorian (incumbent)	30,844	66.68
Rudy Melendez	9,166	19.81
Ayinde Jones	6,248	13.51
Total votes	46,258	100.00

=== District 4 ===
2020 Los Angeles City Council District 4 election November 3, 2020
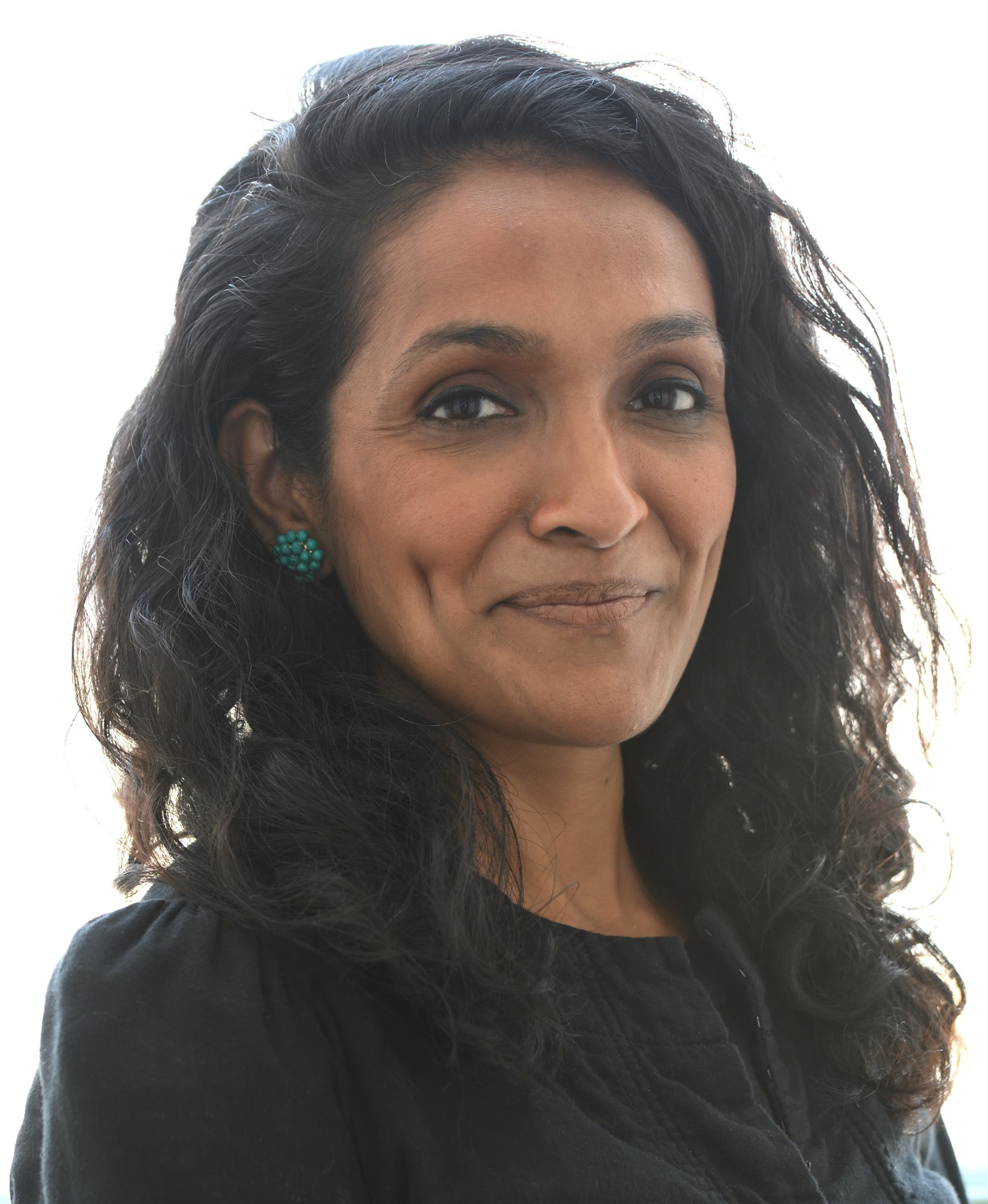

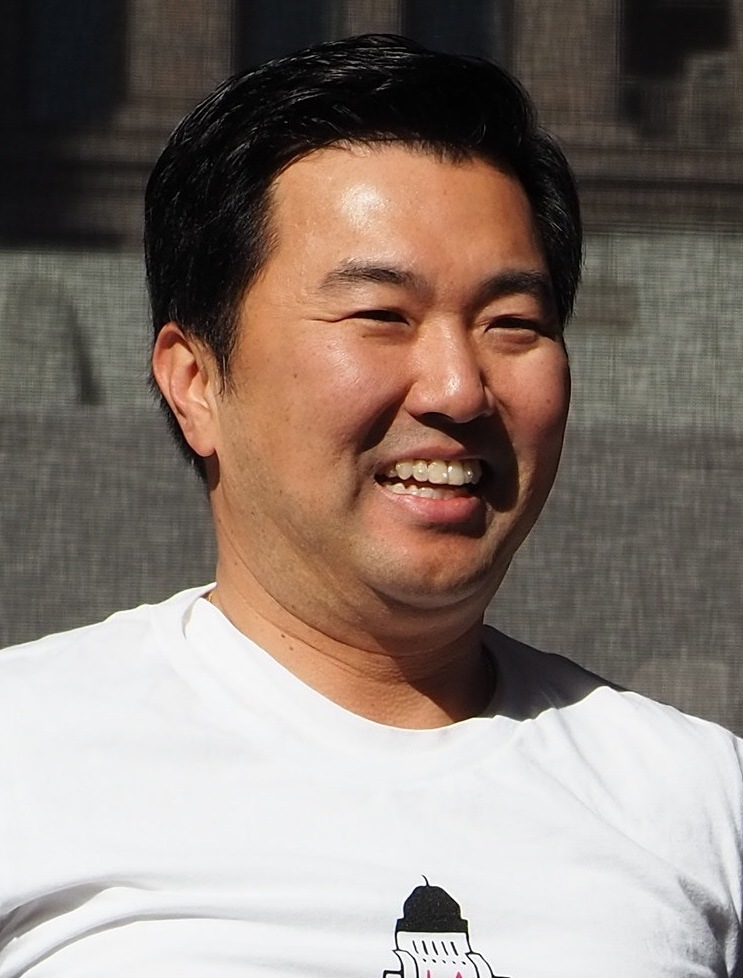

Candidate	Nithya Raman	David Ryu	Sarah Kate Levy
First round	31,502; 40.82%	34,298; 44.42%	10,860; 14.07%
Runoff	70,317; 52.87%	62,682; 47.13%	Eliminated
City councilor before election
David Ryu
City councilor after election
Nithya Raman

==== Candidates ====
- Sarah Kate Levy, writer and women's advocate
- Nithya Raman, urban planner and activist
- David Ryu, incumbent councilmember

==== Did not make ballot ====
- Eric Christie
- Susan Collins, community activist

==== Withdrew ====
- Lisa Cahan-Davis, manager at Urban Land Institute
- Richard Joseph, entertainment attorney
- Sarah Sun Liew, CEO of Meridian Business Legal Investment Wish Foundation
- Artin Sodaify, lawyer

==== Results ====
2020 Los Angeles City Council District 4 election
Primary election
Candidate	Votes	%
David Ryu (incumbent)	34,298	44.42
Nithya Raman	31,502	40.80
Sarah Kate Levy	10,860	14.07
Susan Collins (Write-in)	553	0.72
Total votes	77,219	100.00
General election
Nithya Raman	70,317	52.87
David Ryu (incumbent)	62,682	47.13
Total votes	132,999	100.00

=== District 6 ===
2020 Los Angeles City Council District 6 election
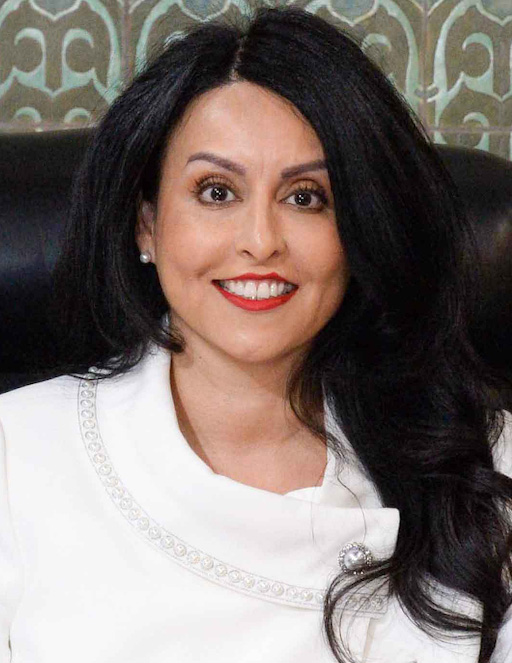

Candidate	Nury Martinez	Benito Bernal	Bill Haller
First round	21,126; 71.85%	4,580; 15.58%	3,698; 12.58%
City councilor before election
Nury Martinez
City councilor after election
Nury Martinez

==== Candidates ====
- Benito Bernal, community advocate and former leader of SEIU Local 99 labor union
- Bill Haller, music studio owner
- Nury Martinez, incumbent councilmember

==== Did not make ballot ====
- Oscar Portillo, chairperson of the Sun Valley Area Neighborhood Council

==== Results ====
2020 Los Angeles City Council District 6 election
Primary election
Candidate	Votes	%
Nury Martinez (incumbent)	21,126	71.85
Benito Bernal	4,580	15.58
Bill Haller	3,698	12.58
Total votes	29,404	100.00

=== District 8 ===
2020 Los Angeles City Council District 8 election
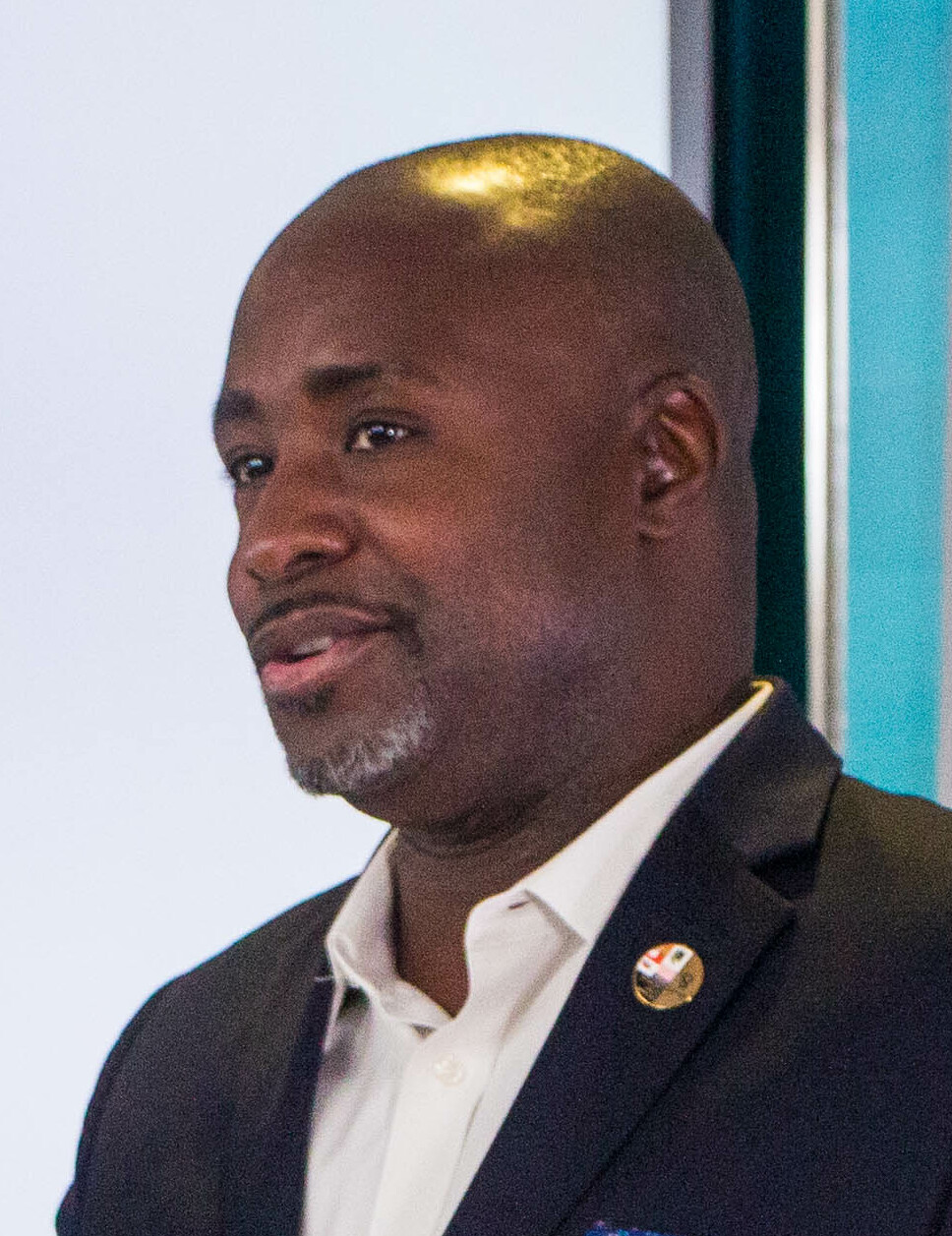
Candidate	Marqueece Harris-Dawson
First round	32,415; 100.00%
City councilor before election
Marqueece Harris-Dawson
City councilor after election
Marqueece Harris-Dawson

==== Candidates ====
- Marqueece Harris-Dawson, incumbent councilmember

==== Did not make ballot ====
- DaJuan W. Bell
- Lee A. Brothers
- Tara Perry
- Ingrid Rivera-Guzman
- Cliff Smith
- Denise Francis Woods, businesswoman

==== Withdrew ====
- Khansa T. Jones-Muhammad Clark, budget advocate

==== Results ====
2020 Los Angeles City Council District 8 election
Primary election
Candidate	Votes	%
Marqueece Harris-Dawson (incumbent)	32,415	100.00
Total votes	32,415	100.00

=== District 10 ===
2020 Los Angeles City Council District 10 election
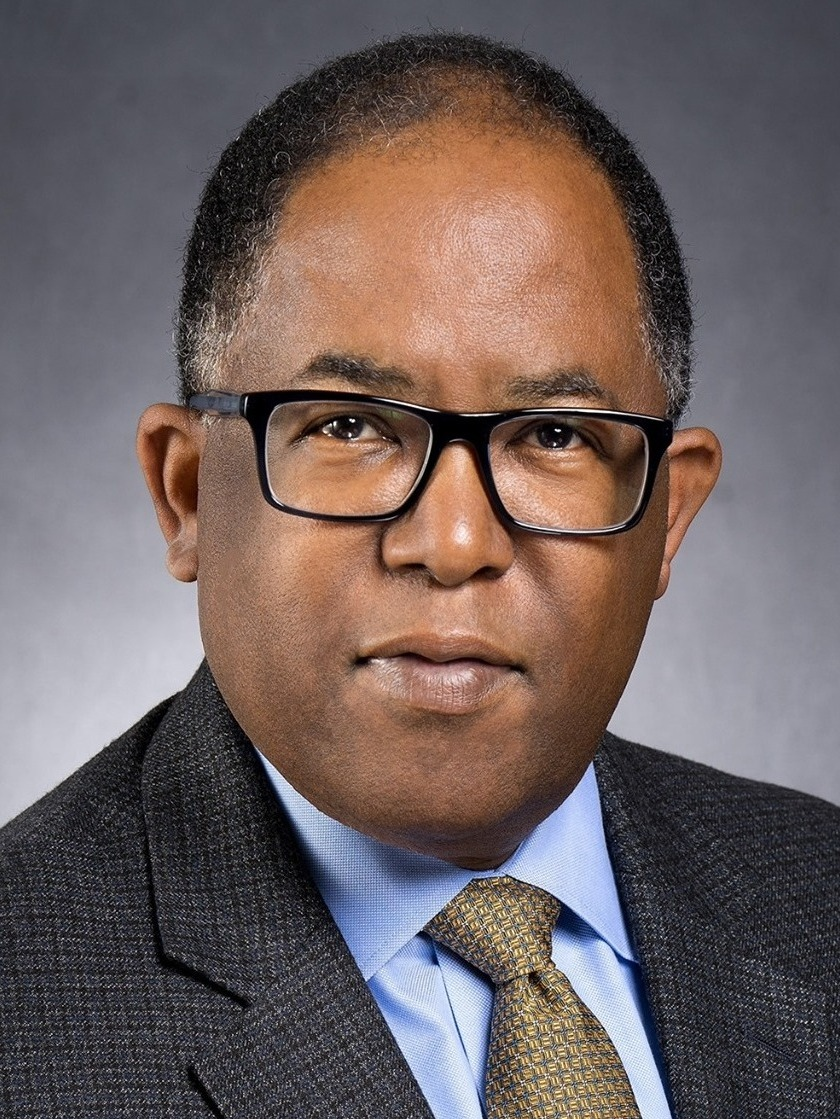

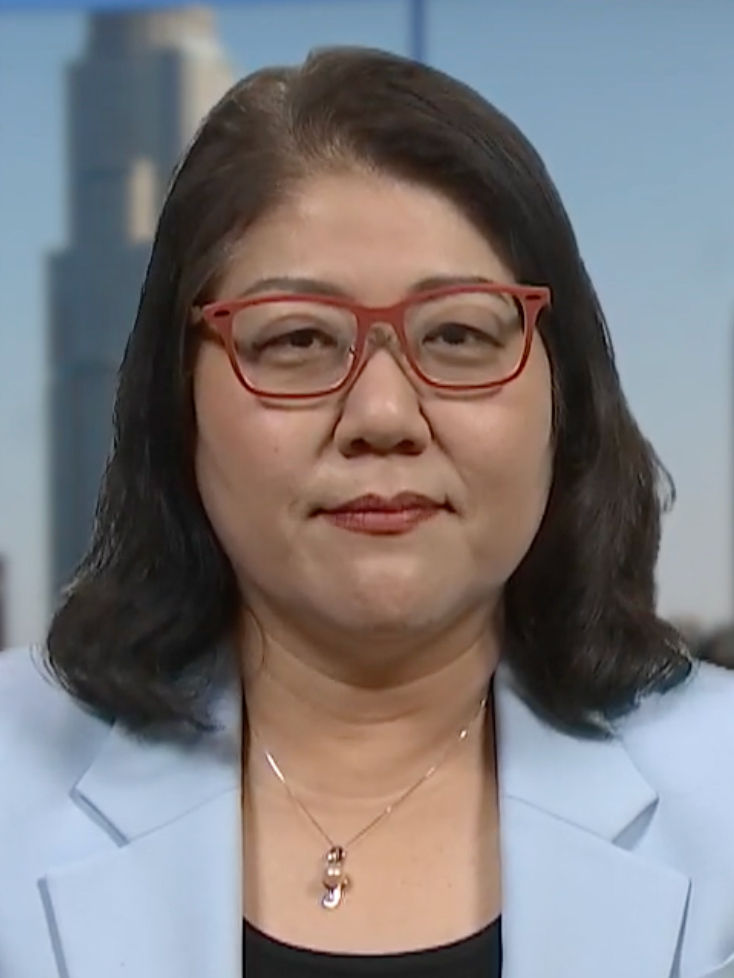

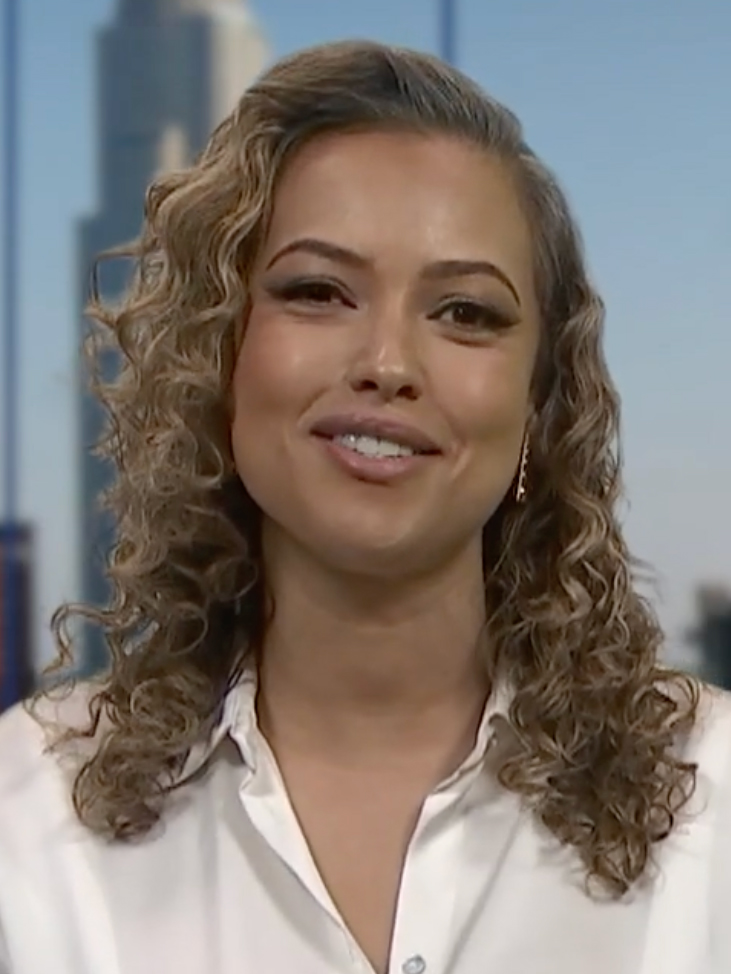

Candidate	Mark Ridley-Thomas	Grace Yoo
First round	21,062; 44.31%	11,220; 23.61%
Runoff	56,119; 60.60%	36,485; 39.40%
Candidate	Aura Vásquez	Melvin Snell
First round	9,996; 21.03%	2,883; 6.07%
Runoff	Eliminated	Eliminated
City councilor before election
Herb Wesson
City councilor after election
Mark Ridley-Thomas

==== Candidates ====
- Channing Martinez, community organizer
- Mark Ridley-Thomas, Los Angeles County Board of Supervisor for the 2nd district
- Melvin Snell, human rights activist
- Aura Vasquez, former Board of Water and Power commissioner
- Grace Yoo, attorney

==== Did not make ballot ====
- Megan Abboud
- Jonothan "Jace" Dawson, store manager
- Dallas Fowler
- Milton Hall
- Holly Hancock
- G. Juan Johnson, housing advocate
- Anne Kim
- Lily Larsen
- Althea Rae Shaw
- Faalaniga Smith
- Jason Underhill

==== Withdrew ====
- Andrea Michelle Wade-Catena

==== Results ====
2020 Los Angeles City Council District 10 election
Primary election
Candidate	Votes	%
Mark Ridley-Thomas	21,062	44.31
Grace Yoo	11,220	23.61
Aura Vásquez	9,996	21.03
Melvin Snell	2,883	6.07
Channing Martinez	2,369	4.98
Total votes	47,530	100.00
General election
Mark Ridley-Thomas	56,119	60.60
Grace Yoo	36,485	39.40
Total votes	92,604	100.00

=== District 12 ===
2020 Los Angeles City Council District 12 election
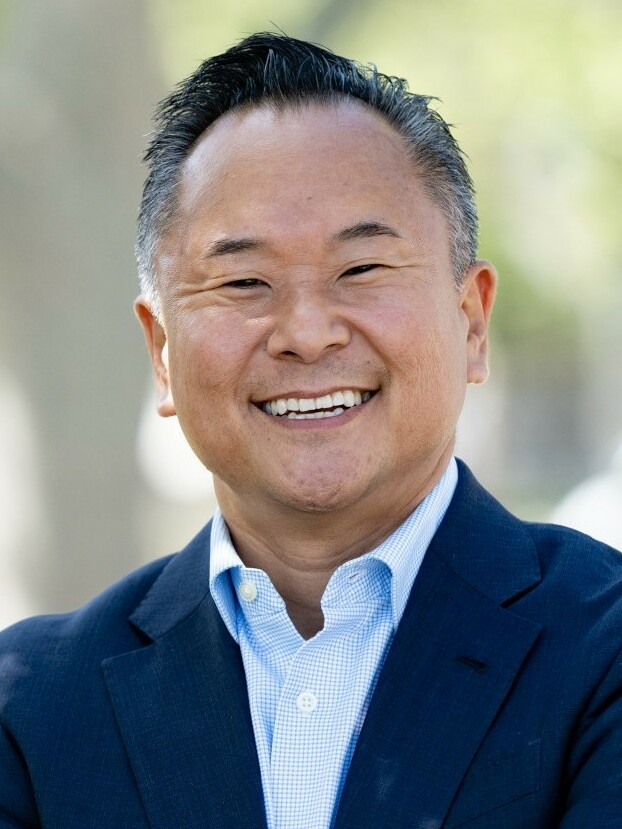

Candidate	John Lee	Loraine Lundquist
First round	33,007; 50.61%	32,206; 49.39%
City councilor before election
John Lee
City councilor after election
John Lee

==== Candidates ====
- John Lee, incumbent councilmember
- Loraine Lundquist, educator and scientist

==== Did not make ballot ====
- Asaad Alnajjar, civil structural engineer
- Jose Luis Gonzalez, recreation facility director

==== Withdrew ====
- Carlos Amador, activist
- Edward Antonino, labor law attorney
- Brandii Grace, game designer and educator

==== Results ====
2020 Los Angeles City Council District 12 election
Primary election
Candidate	Votes	%
John Lee (incumbent)	33,007	50.61
Loraine Lundquist	32,206	49.39
Total votes	65,213	100.00

=== District 14 ===
2020 Los Angeles City Council District 14 election
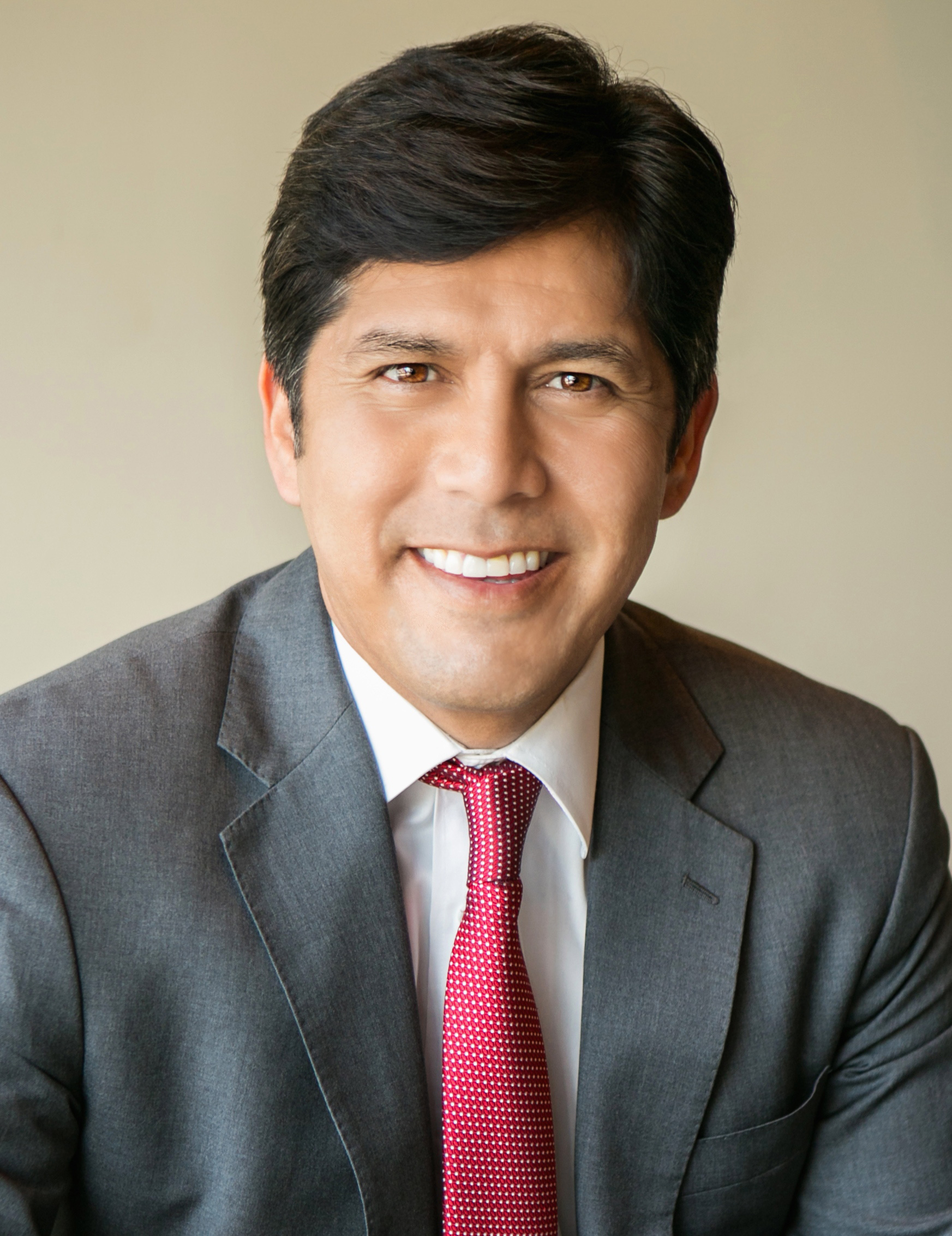

Candidate	Kevin de León	Cyndi Otteson
First round	25,083; 52.61%	9,294; 19.49%
Candidate	Raquel Zamora	Mónica García
First round	6,483; 13.60%	1,595; 3.35%
City councilor before election
Kevin de León
City councilor after election
Kevin de León

==== Candidates ====
- Kevin de León, California state senator and President pro tempore of the California State Senate
- John Jimenez, nonprofit executive
- Mónica Garcia, LAUSD Board of Education member for District 2
- Cyndi Otteson, advertising executive and Vice President of the Eagle Rock Neighborhood Council
- Raquel Zamora, teacher, counselor, social worker and small business owner

==== Did not make ballot ====
- Monica Alcaraz, community advocate
- Stanley Deacon Alexander
- Hal Bastian, real estate agent and consultant
- David Bloom
- Barry Boen
- Ian K. Chi-Young
- Eric Christie
- Hidemi Ena
- Dentis Davis Fowlkes, Hermon Neighborhood Council Board member
- Jana Grochoske, model
- Freddie Huguez, former baseball coach
- Maria Janossy, immigration lawyer, community leader and activist
- Marcus Lovingood, new media producer, political activist, and internet entrepreneur
- William "Rodriguez" Morrison, community organizer and perennial candidate
- Kendrick Rustad, creative director of KR Interior Design Group
- Jamie Tijerina, researcher at California Institute of Technology

==== Withdrew ====
- Richelle Huizar, wife of vacated councilmember José Huizar
- Brian Andres Mico-Quinn

==== Results ====
2020 Los Angeles City Council District 14 election
Primary election
Candidate	Votes	%
Kevin de León (incumbent)	25,083	52.61
Cyndi Otteson	9,294	19.49
Raquel Zamora	6,483	13.60
Mónica García	5,222	10.95
John Jimenez	1,595	3.35
Total votes	47,677	100.00

== LAUSD Board of Education ==
=== District 1 ===
==== Candidates ====
- George J. McKenna III, incumbent board member

==== Did not make ballot ====
- Michael Batie, author and professor
- John Brasfield, educator, boxer, and coach
- Toni Henderson
- Tunette Powell, educator and activist

==== Results ====
2020 LAUSD Board of Education District 1 election
Primary election
Candidate	Votes	%
George J. McKenna III (incumbent)	107,280	100.00
Total votes	107,280	100.00

=== District 3 ===
==== Candidates ====
- Elizabeth Badger, small business owner and CEO of Minority Outreach Committee
- Marilyn Koziatek, member of parent-teacher association
- Scott Schmerelson, incumbent board member

==== Did not make ballot ====
- John Sandy Campbell, teacher
- Annette McClain, pharmacy tech
- Christopher Meredith, substitute teacher
- Kenneth "Kenchy" Ragsdale III, founder of Kids Not Politics

==== Results ====
2020 LAUSD Board of Education District 5 election
Primary election
Candidate	Votes	%
Scott Schmerelson	56,737	42.37
Marilyn Koziatek	42,301	31.59
Elizabeth Badger	34,856	26.03
Total votes	133,894	100.00

=== District 5 ===
- Jackie Goldberg, incumbent board member
- Christina Martinez Duran, teacher, adviser, and educational consultant

==== Did not make ballot ====
- Maria del Pilar Avalos, member of the Community Advisory Committee

==== Results ====
2020 LAUSD Board of Education District 5 election
Primary election
Candidate	Votes	%
Jackie Goldberg (incumbent)	65,081	58.40
Christina Martinez Duran	46,356	41.60
Total votes	11,143	100.00

=== District 7 ===
==== Candiatees ====
- Silke Bradford, teacher and school administrator
- Patricia Castellanos, deputy director of L.A. Alliance for a New Economy
- Tanya Ortiz Franklin, lawyer and former teacher
- Mike Lansing, former LAUSD board member from 1999 to 2007

==== Did not make ballot ====
- Estuardo Ruano, homeless activist

==== Withdrew ====
- Edgar Campos
- Lydia Gutierrez, math teacher
- Nichelle Henderson, member of the Los Angeles Community College Board of Trustees

==== Results ====
2020 LAUSD Board of Education District 5 primary election
Primary election
Candidate	Votes	%
Patricia Castellanos	22,812	27.32
Tanya Ortiz Franklin	19,956	23.90
Lydia Gutierrez	16,684	19.98
Mike Lansing	16,673	19.97
Silke Bradford	7,364	8.82
Total votes	83,489	100.00

2020 LAUSD Board of Education District 5 general election
Primary election
Candidate	Votes	%
Tanya Ortiz Franklin	110,413	57.3
Patricia Castellanos	82,208	42.7
Total votes	192,621	100.00
