= Finding Fred =

Podcast about Fred Rogers

Finding Fred is a podcast hosted by Carvell Wallace that explores the life and philosophy of Fred Rogers, the creator and host of the children's television show Mister Rogers' Neighborhood.

== History ==
The podcast debuted on October 15, 2019, and consists of ten episodes that delve into various themes related to Rogers’ teachings.

The concept for the podcast arose from a desire to examine the complexities of Fred Rogers as both an individual and a cultural figure. Each episode features discussions with guests who reflect on their personal experiences with Mister Rogers' Neighborhood and how its messages resonated within broader societal contexts. The series provides historical insights into Rogers' life and work while connecting his teachings to modern issues faced by children and families today.

The podcast is produced by Fatherly and iHeartRadio.

== Reception ==
The series has been well-received for addressing important social issues through the lens of Rogers' timeless messages. It was rated #1 Podcast of 2019 by The Atlantic.
