= Tom LaBonge =

American politician (1953–2021)

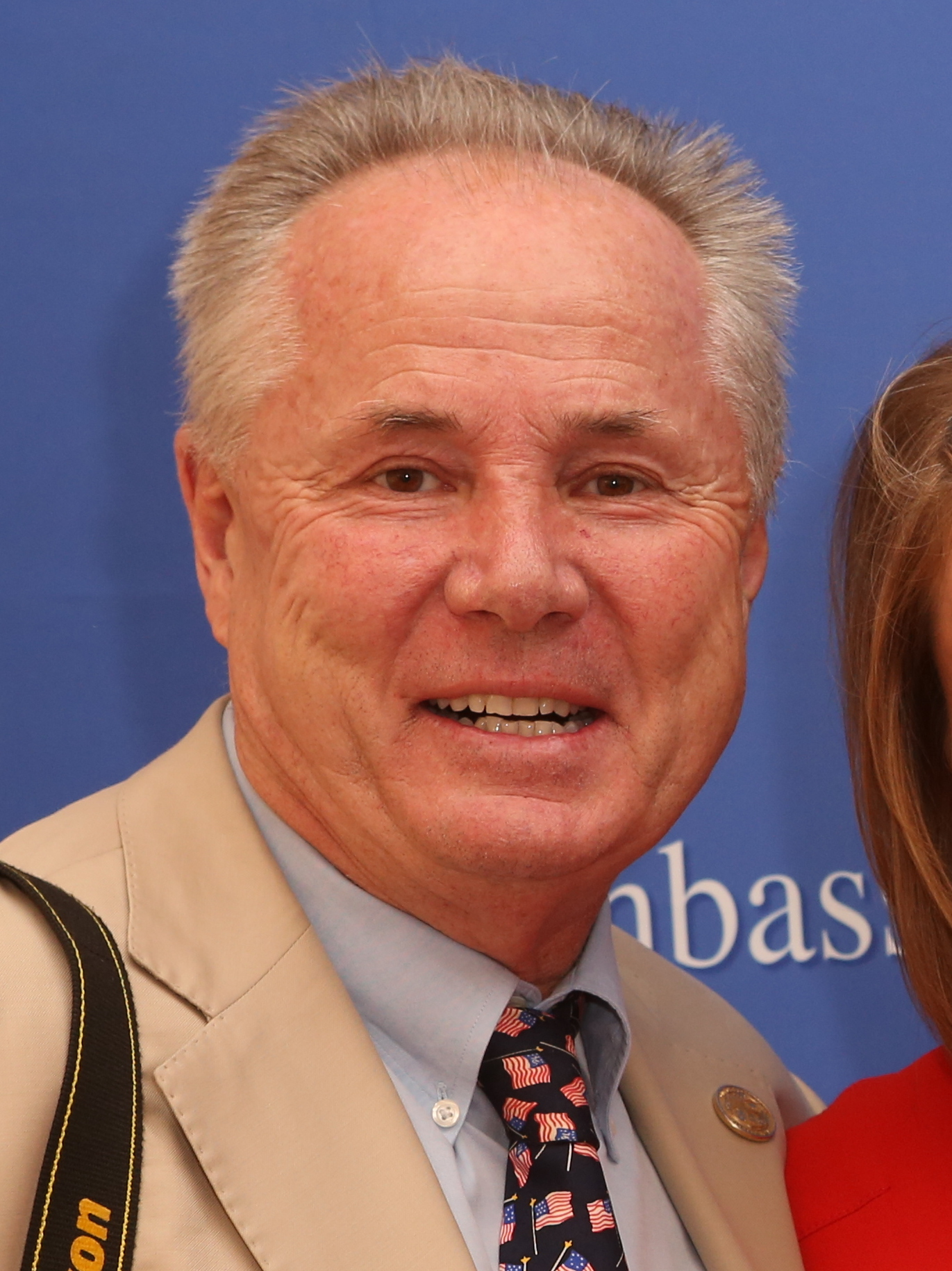

Member of the Los Angeles City Council from the 4th district
- In office November 1, 2001 – July 1, 2015
- Preceded by: John Ferraro
- Succeeded by: David Ryu

Assistant President Pro Tempore of the Los Angeles City Council
- In office January 3, 2012 – July 28, 2015
- Preceded by: Dennis Zine
- Succeeded by: Nury Martinez

Personal details
- Born: October 6, 1953 Los Angeles, California, U.S.
- Died: January 7, 2021 (aged 67) Los Angeles, California, U.S.
- Party: Democratic
- Spouse: Brigid Manning LaBonge (m. 1988)
- Education: California State University, Los Angeles
- Occupation: Politician
- Website: www.tomlabonge.com

Thomas J. LaBonge (October 6, 1953 – January 7, 2021) was an American politician. A member of the Democratic Party, he served on the Los Angeles City Council from 2001 to 2015, representing the city's 4th district.

== Education ==
A graduate of John Marshall High School, LaBonge received his bachelor's degree in sociology from California State University, Los Angeles.

== Career ==
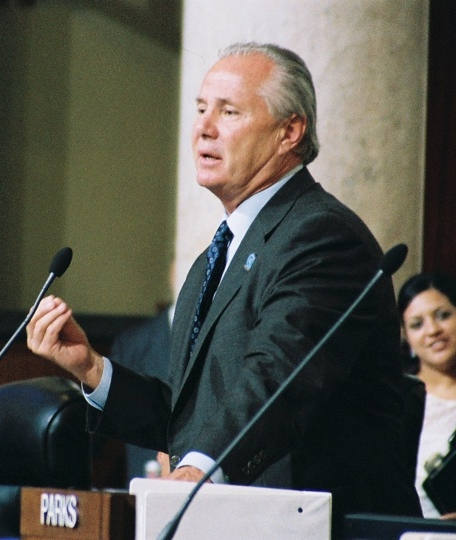
Tom LaBonge addressing City Council.

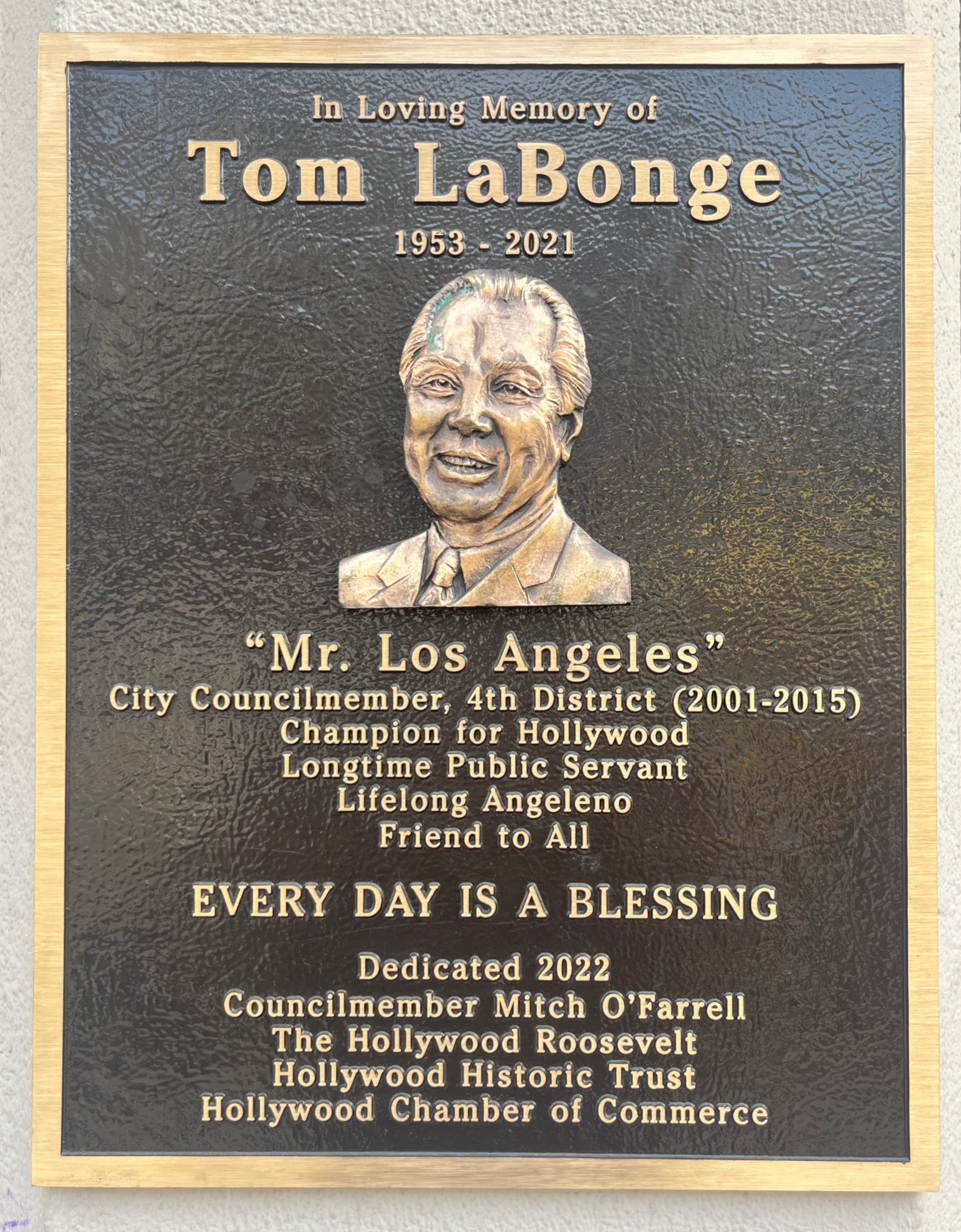
Plaque to Tom LaBonge, Hollywood Boulevard.

He was a member of the Los Angeles City Council representing the 4th district, serving from 2001 to 2015. He won a special election to fill the seat left vacant by the death of long-time council member John Ferraro. The district included a wide diversity of incomes and neighborhoods. During his time in office, he was the Chairman of the Arts, Parks, Health and Aging Committee, Vice Chairman of the Transportation Committee and the Ad Hoc River Committee, and a member of the Trade, Commerce & Tourism Committee, and the Ad Hoc on Recovering Energy, Natural Resources & Economic Benefit from Waste for L.A. (RENEW LA) in the city of Los Angeles. He was a member of the Democratic Party.

Before serving as councilman, LaBonge was Director of Community Relations at the Department of Water and Power, Special Assistant to Mayor Richard Riordan, and Chief Deputy to Council President John Ferraro. LaBonge was a lifelong advocate for Griffith Park, one of the largest urban parks in the nation, which fell in his old council district.

== Personal life ==
He married graphic designer and illustrator Brigid Manning LaBonge in 1988. Before his death, LaBonge resided in the Silver Lake district of Los Angeles with his wife and their two children, Mary-Cate and Charles.

== Death ==
LaBonge died on January 7, 2021, at the age of 67.

Political offices
Preceded by John Ferraro	Los Angeles City Councilmember, 4th district November 1, 2001 – July 1, 2015	Succeeded by David Ryu
Preceded by Dennis Zine	Assistant President Pro Tem of the Los Angeles City Council; January 3, 2012-July 28, 2015	Succeeded by Nury Martinez
