= Nithya Raman =

American politician (born 1981)

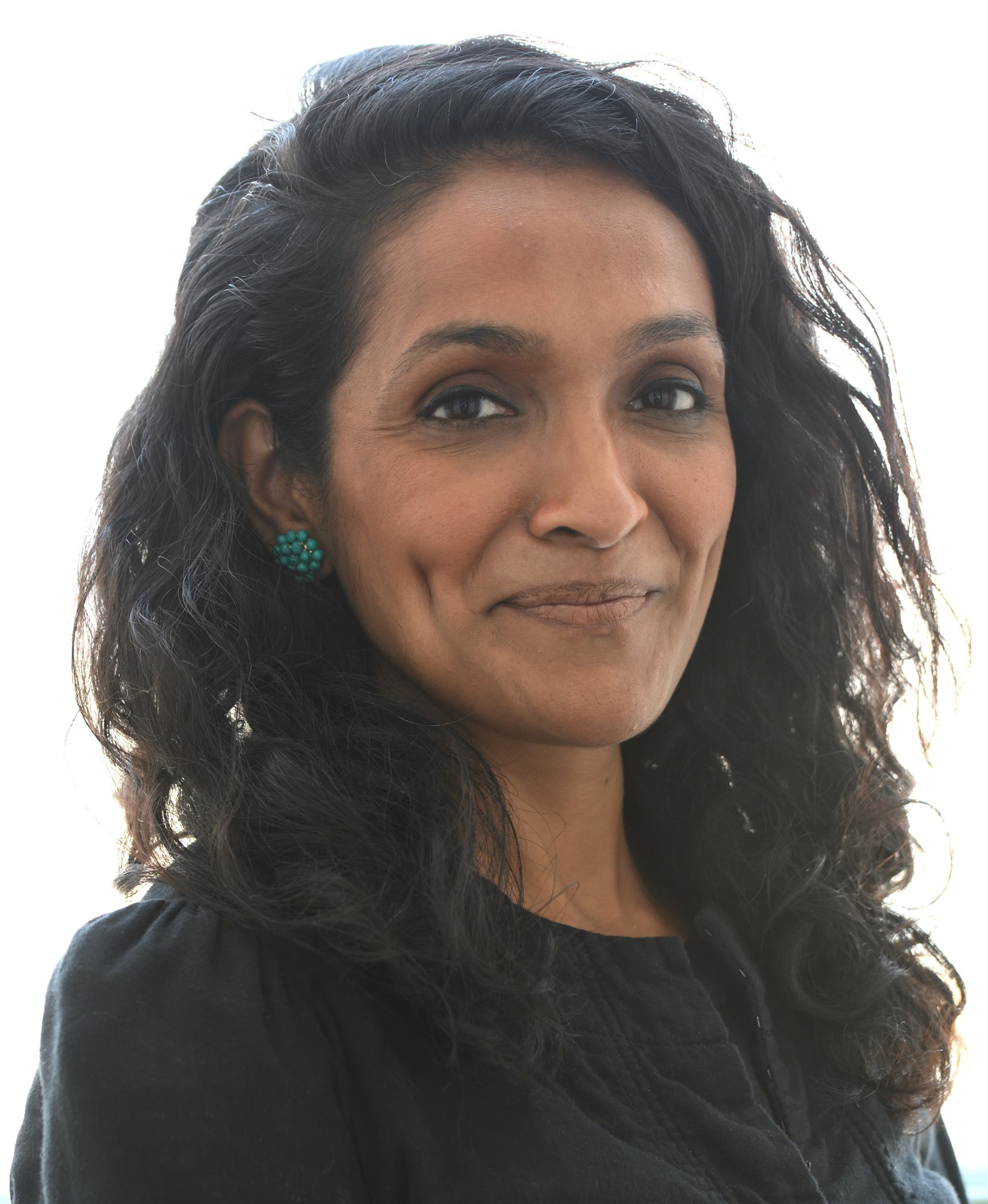
- Official portrait, 2022

Mayor-elect of Los Angeles
- Assuming office December 14, 2026
- Succeeding: Karen Bass

Member of the Los Angeles City Council from the 4th district
- Incumbent
- Assumed office December 14, 2020
- Preceded by: David Ryu

Personal details
- Born: Nithya Varsha Raman; July 28, 1981 (age 45) Thrissur, Kerala, India
- Party: Democratic
- Other political affiliations: Democratic Socialists of America
- Spouse: Vali Chandrasekaran
- Children: 2
- Education: Harvard University (BA); Massachusetts Institute of Technology (MCP)
- Website: City Council website Campaign website

Nithya Varsha Raman (Note: Pronounced /ˈnɪθ.jə ˈrɑː.mən/.) (born July 28, 1981) is an American politician and urban planner who is the mayor-elect of Los Angeles. A member of the Democratic Party and the Democratic Socialists of America, Raman has served as the Los Angeles city councilmember for the 4th district since 2020.

Born in India, Raman was educated at Harvard University and the Massachusetts Institute of Technology. She defeated incumbent councilmember David Ryu in 2020 and was re-elected in 2024. In the 2026 Los Angeles mayoral election, Raman advanced in the primary to challenge the incumbent, Karen Bass, and defeated her in the November general election. Upon taking office on December 14, 2026, she will become the first Asian-American, Indian-American, and Hindu mayor of Los Angeles.

== Early life and career ==
Nithya Varsha Raman is a Tamil Indian American who was born into an Iyer family in Thrissur, Kerala. Her father, Venkataraman "Venkit" Raman, previously worked as an engineer at KELTRON. Her mother, Sudha Kechery worked in banking at Indian Overseas Bank. Her family moved to Louisiana when Raman was six years old, then settled in Burlington, Massachusetts. Raman attended Harvard University earning a bachelor's degree in social studies in 2003, and a master's degree in urban planning in 2008 from MIT. She became a naturalized American citizen at age 22.

Raman returned to India at age 23, and eventually founded the research firm Transparent Chennai. The firm's goal was to improve sanitation in the city of Chennai. In 2013, Raman moved to Los Angeles and worked for the city administrative officer of Los Angeles. In 2017, Raman founded and headed SELAH Neighborhood Homeless Coalition, a homelessness outreach nonprofit in Los Angeles. She also served as the executive director of Time's Up Entertainment.

== Los Angeles City Council ==
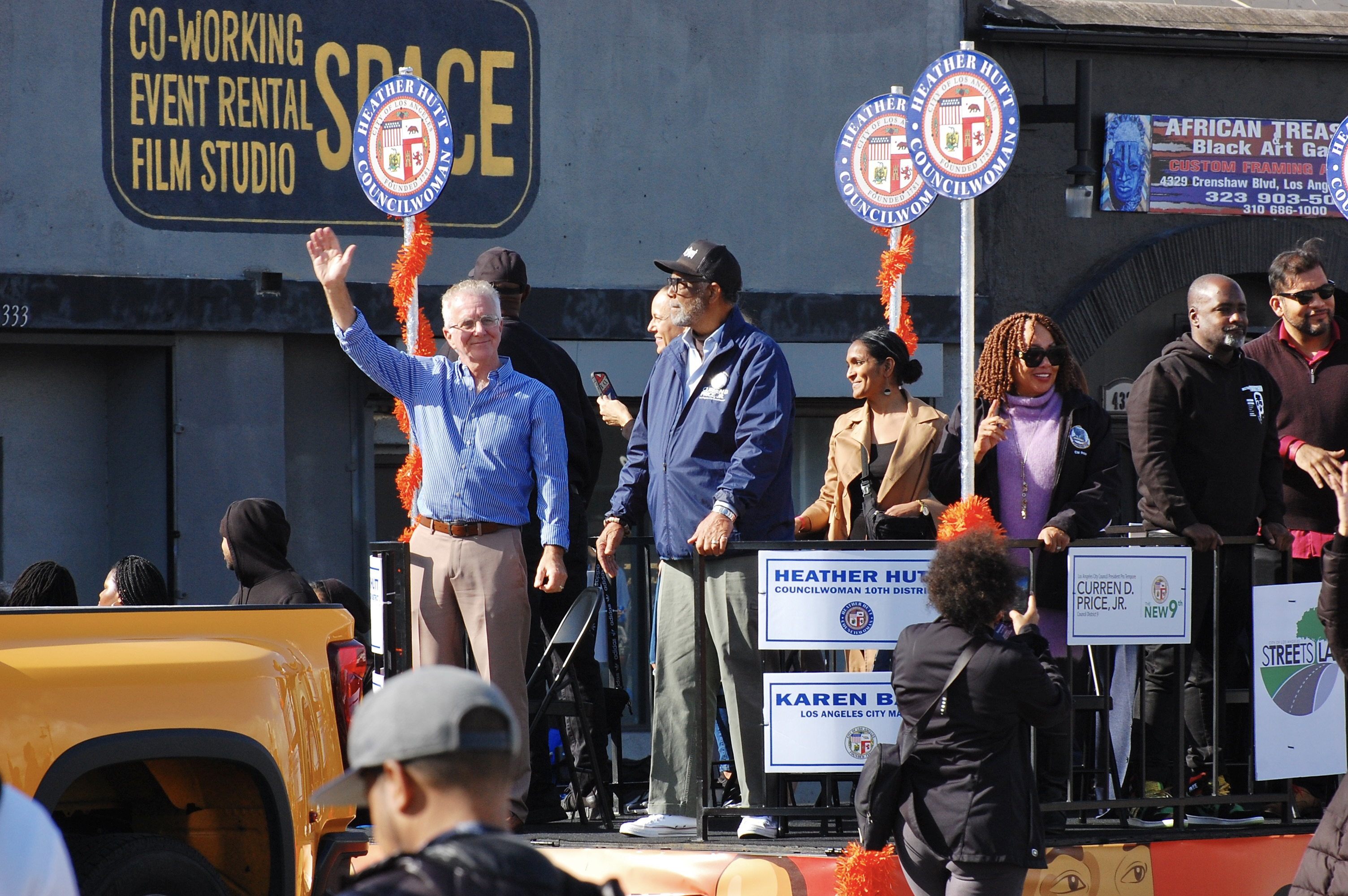
Raman (in brown coat) with other City Council members during a parade in 2023

=== 2020 election ===
In 2019, Raman declared her candidacy for Los Angeles City Council's 4th District against incumbent council member David Ryu. Raman's candidacy was fueled by a "volunteer army" of grassroots canvassers who knocked over 83,000 doors. Most canvassers were from Ground Game LA, which formed after the 2017 defeat of Green Party-endorsed candidate Jessica Salans by Mitch O'Farrell in the 13th District, and from Los Angeles Democratic Socialists of America (DSA-LA).

Raman's platform included proposed reforms to Los Angeles' housing and homelessness policy, "a new approach to public safety", and a climate change plan that she claims will get Los Angeles to carbon neutrality by 2030. She has signed the Participatory Budget Pledge, an initiative put forward by Black Lives Matter LA which expresses a commitment to "holding a participatory budgeting process each budget cycle I hold elected office." The Los Angeles Police Protective League (LAPPL) police union strongly opposed Raman and spent over $200,000 in support of Ryu.

In the March 2020 primary, Raman faced incumbent David Ryu and screenwriter Sarah Kate Levy. Ryu received 32,298 votes (44.4%), Raman 31,502 votes (40.8%), and Levy 10,860 votes (14.1%). Raman and Ryu advanced to the November 2020 runoff election, in which Raman won 70,317 votes (52.9%) and Ryu 62,682 votes (47.1%).

Raman's victory was described as a "political earthquake" by the Los Angeles Times. Raman's victory over Ryu was the first time in 17 years that a challenger defeated an incumbent Los Angeles city councilmember, and the most votes of any winning city councilor in history, representing a progressive challenge to City Hall.

=== 2024 reelection ===
In 2024, Raman was challenged by Ethan Weaver, a deputy city attorney who received support from local landlords, business groups, and police and firefighter unions.

In January, corporate megadonors formed Thrive LA PAC, which announced a seven-figure campaign to unseat Raman. The Los Angeles Police Protective League (LAPPL) again strongly opposed Raman. In March, Raman accepted an endorsement from Democrats for Israel Los Angeles (DFI-LA). In response, Los Angeles Democratic Socialists of America (DSA-LA) formally censured Raman, but maintained its endorsement of her reelection campaign.

Raman won the election in the primary in March 2024, skipping a November runoff by winning 50.6% of the vote outright, against 38.6% for Weaver, her nearest opponent.

=== Tenure ===
Raman and Mayor Karen Bass in 2023

In April 2021, Raman proposed amendments to a draft ordinance on tenant harassment. The amendments classified cash buyout offers and threats to report false information to law enforcement as forms of harassment, and included a rent adjustment penalty, which would prevent landlords who violate the ordinance from raising a unit's rent. The ordinance was passed in June 2021.

In June 2021, Raman was served with a recall notice after only six months in office. The Los Angeles Times referred to the notice as part of a "recall fever" striking California, as at least 68 other active recalls were then ongoing in the state, including the recall of Governor Gavin Newsom. In September 2021 the recall campaign collapsed when proponents announced that they were unable to collect the required number of signatures within the allotted time.

On February 1, 2022, Raman was appointed to the board of the South Coast Air Quality Management District by Mayor of Los Angeles Eric Garcetti. She replaced councilmember Joe Buscaino. She pledged to prioritize public health and environmental justice from that position. Shortly after she declared her candidacy for mayor in February 2026, it was revealed that Mayor Bass had removed Raman from the board a month prior. Environmental activists speculated that Bass might have been displeased with Raman's push for a "more aggressive" approach to enforcing environmental regulations.

In 2021 and 2022, Raman was one of three councilmembers to vote against LAMC section 41.18, a city ordinance that banned homeless encampments within 500 feet of schools and daycare centers. 41.18 was adopted by the City Council by a vote of 11–3, over the objections of activists who protested the measure in the council chamber. In remarks in a City Council meeting, Raman argued that the measure "creates a district by district arms-race, where people will get pushed around from district to district instead of having a citywide strategy that prioritizes intervention in encampments by need, by safety, by fire risk, by all of the things that we are claiming to be so concerned about. In the end, this will just push people around again. It's not going to solve homelessness or get anybody into housing."

A leaked recording between Council President Nury Martinez, Councilmembers Kevin de León and Gil Cedillo, as well as Los Angeles County Federation of Labor President Ron Herrera revealed the group's plan to use redistricting to oust Raman. Speaking of Raman, Cedillo stated, "There's certain people who don't merit us rescuing them... She's not our ally, she's not going to help us" and de León proposed to put her district "in a blender, chop it up left or right." The group planned to split the Koreatown neighborhood, a voting bloc for Raman, so that minority voters in her renters' district would be divided and she would face tougher reelection. After the conversation was leaked, Raman introduced a measure to ask voters to change the city charter so redistricting would be handled by an independent commission.

In June 2023, during a protest led by UNITE HERE Local 11 to support local hotel workers, the Los Angeles Police Department arrested Raman after she refused to disperse.

She was the council's assistant president pro tempore, succeeding Bob Blumenfield, from January 28, 2025, to April 14, 2026, when then-Council President Marqueece Harris-Dawson replaced her with Councilmember John Lee.

In November 2025, city council passed a motion authored by Raman that capped maximum annual rent increase for rent-stabilized apartments, which house nearly half of the city's residents, at four percent. This change was the first time the city's rent stabilization ordinance had been strengthened in 40 years.

== Mayor of Los Angeles ==
=== 2026 election ===
On February 7, 2026, Raman announced that she would challenge incumbent Karen Bass in the 2026 Los Angeles mayoral election. The Los Angeles Times labeled it a "surprise bid", pointing out that the announcement was made hours before the candidate filing deadline, and that Raman had endorsed Bass for re-election just weeks before. Bass herself called Raman's candidacy "a surprise", but declined to label it as betrayal.

Raman's campaign largely focused on increasing housing production in Los Angeles, improving city services, and revitalizing Los Angeles's film industry. She voiced her dissatisfaction with Inside Safe, Bass's program to move homeless people off the street and described the program as fiscally unsustainable, saying that it produced "very different outcomes and hugely differential costs". In June 2026, it was reported that around one-third of units under Los Angeles's master leasing program, around 250 units, have remained vacant under Bass's tenure.

Raman criticized Bass for not doing enough to increase film production in Los Angeles, including only appointing a liaison between the city and the film industry over two and a half years into Bass's mayoralty. Bass's campaign criticized Raman for recusing herself from four of seven votes on motions in the city council to streamline film production. Raman explained that she recused herself to avoid a potential conflict of interest, as her husband, Vali Chandrasekaran, works in the film industry.

Polls consistently had Raman and former reality television star Spencer Pratt competing for second place, with Mayor Bass in first. On election night, initial counts had Raman trailing by over eight percent. As more ballots, including a large number of outstanding mail ballots, were counted, the race to advance to the November general election gradually narrowed. Seven days after polls closed, Raman overtook Pratt for second place, and the Associated Press, NBC News, and CNN projected that she would advance to the runoff the next day. Raman eventually defeated Bass and was elected as mayor, making her the first Asian-American, Indian-American, and Hindu person elected mayor of Los Angeles.

== Political positions ==
=== Housing ===
In 2024, amid a housing shortage in Los Angeles, Raman proposed to permit mid-sized apartment buildings near public transit stations in some neighborhoods zoned exclusively for single-family houses. The proposal was rejected by a 10–5 margin in the City Council, which instead chose to pursue larger apartment buildings in urban areas.

In August 2025, Raman voted against a city council resolution which formally opposed California Senate Bill 79, a bill which overrides local zoning to allow multifamily housing near transit stops.

In January 2026, Raman introduced a motion to reform Measure ULA, also known as the "Mansion Tax", in city council. The voter-approved measure introduced a tax on property sales valued at over $5.3 million. Raman, who supported the measure's passage in 2022, said that it had become a "major obstacle" to building new housing. Additionally, Raman called revenue from the measure "an absolutely essential resource" and warned that, without reform, attempts to repeal the measure entirely were more likely to succeed. Joe Donlin, director of United to House LA, opposed reform and said repeal of ULA was one of many "boogymen trotted out to try to scare the public into giving tax breaks for developers." In April 2026, a statewide initiative to repeal Measure ULA qualified for the November ballot.

In July 2026, the LA Times reported that, while street homelessness rose by 8% across LA city, it was reduced by 49% in Raman's district.

=== Israel–Palestine ===
In November 2023, Raman adjourned a city council meeting to memorialize "the many civilian lives that have now been lost in Gaza". In June 2024, she and Councilmembers Hernandez and Soto-Martinez introduced a municipal resolution to call for an "immediate and permanent ceasefire" in the Gaza war. Having condemned the Hamas-led October 7 attacks on Israel in 2023, Raman has described Israel's actions in Gaza as a genocide, citing international experts and the Israeli targeting of hospitals and children. She believes the BDS movement is "a legitimate form of peaceful protest" though notes that BDS is not part of her platform.

In 2024, Raman received the endorsement of Democrats for Israel-Los Angeles (DFI-LA), an organization that describes itself as "the pro-Israel voice across all of Los Angeles County to the Democratic Party". She was censured by the Los Angeles chapter of the Democratic Socialists of America for this, although her endorsement for re-election was maintained. Raman later said in an interview with Hasan Piker that she "wouldn't seek out [DFI-LA's endorsement] now." However, for the 2026 Los Angeles mayoral election, DFI-LA endorsed Raman's opponent Karen Bass, while DSA again endorsed Raman.

== Personal life ==
Raman resides in the Silver Lake neighborhood of Los Angeles. She is married to television screenwriter Vali Chandrasekaran, a fellow Harvard alumnus. The two have twins, a son and a daughter.

Raman is a Hindu.

== Electoral history ==
Los Angeles City Council District 4, 2020
Primary election
Candidate	Votes	%
David Ryu (incumbent)	32,298	44.4
Nithya Raman	31,502	40.8
Sarah Kate Levy	10,860	14.1
Total votes	72,219	100.00
General election
Nithya Raman	70,317	52.87
David Ryu (incumbent)	62,682	47.13
Total votes	132,999	100.00

Los Angeles City Council District 4, 2024
Candidate	Votes	%
Nithya Raman (incumbent)	32,562	50.67
Ethan Weaver	24,799	38.59
Levon Baronian	6,899	10.74
Total votes	64,260	100.00

2026 Los Angeles Primary Mayoral Election
Primary election
Candidate	Votes	%
Karen Bass (incumbent)	292,593	34.3
Nithya Raman	247,781	29.0
Spencer Pratt	217,977	25.5
Adam Miller	30,008	3.5
Rae Chen Huang	25,220	3.0
Juanita Lopez	13,032	1.5
Andrew Kim	6,988	0.8
Suzy Kim	6,051	0.7
Assad Alnajjar	4,063	0.5
Bryant Acosta	3,470	0.4
John Logsdon	3,029	0.4
Tish Hyman	1,640	0.2
Andrej Selivra	1,159	0.1
Nelson Cheng	881	0.1
Total votes	853,892	100.0
General election

2026 Los Angeles General Mayoral Election
Candidate	Votes	%
Karen Bass (incumbent)	505,634	45.1
Nithya Raman	616,495	54.9
Total votes		100.0

== See also ==
- List of mayors of the 50 largest cities in the United States
- List of socialist mayors in the United States
- List of Democratic Socialists of America who have held office in the United States
- List of mayors of Los Angeles
