= David Ryu =

American politician

David E. Ryu
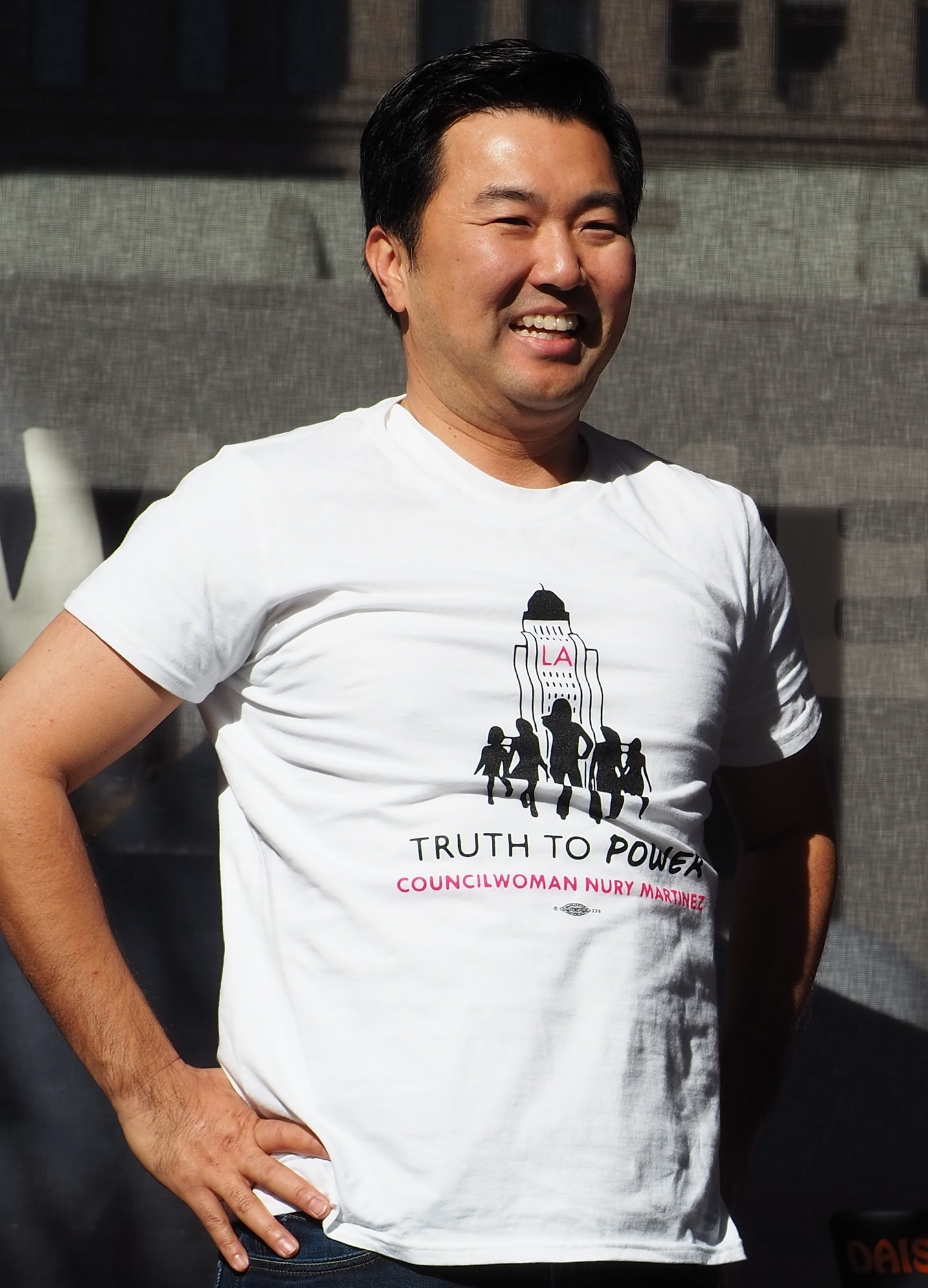
- Ryu at the Los Angeles 2019 Women's March

Member of the Los Angeles City Council from the 4th district
- In office July 1, 2015 – December 14, 2020
- Preceded by: Tom LaBonge
- Succeeded by: Nithya Raman

Assistant President Pro Tempore of the Los Angeles City Council
- In office January 5, 2020 – December 14, 2020
- Preceded by: Joe Buscaino
- Succeeded by: Bob Blumenfield

Personal details
- Born: Ryu Eun-seok; 1975 (age 50–51) Seoul, South Korea
- Party: Democratic
- Education: University of California, Los Angeles (BA); Rutgers University (MPP)
- Occupation: Politician

Korean name
- Hangul: 유은석
- RR: Yu Eunseok
- MR: Yu Ŭnsŏk

David Eun Seok Ryu (Korean: 유은석; born 1975) is an American politician who served as city councilmemberman for Los Angeles's 4th district from 2015 to 2020. He is the first Korean-American to hold a council seat in Los Angeles, California, and the first Asian-American to serve on Los Angeles City Council Leadership. Ryu was defeated by Nithya Raman in the November 3, 2020 general election.

== Early life ==
Ryu was born Ryu Eun-seok in Seoul, South Korea, in 1975, the eldest of three children. His father, Eul Chul Ryu, and mother, Michelle Won Chung Ryu, moved the family to Los Angeles, California in 1980. Ryu's father was the editor in chief of the Korean Street Journal, a newspaper based in Los Angeles, and his mother worked as a nurse.

Ryu has said he grew up in a low-income household and described his childhood as one where his parents struggled, working multiple jobs to support Ryu, his grandmother and his two siblings. Ryu's parents opened a toy store in the Koreatown neighborhood of Los Angeles, where Ryu worked his first job at 10 years old, translating for his parents at the cash register.

After graduating from UCLA with a degree in economics, Ryu earned a master's degree in public policy and administration at Rutgers University.

== Career ==
After graduating from UCLA, Ryu became a Deputy to Los Angeles County Supervisor Yvonne Burke. He later worked as a special investigator for Los Angeles County's Auditor-Controller.

Ryu became a trained crisis intervention mediator with the County of Los Angeles and went into South LA and East LA with Nate Redfern, a member of the Long Beach Insane Crips gang, to broker peaceful resolutions between black customers and immigrant store owners.

Ryu served as Senior Deputy to Los Angeles County Supervisor Yvonne Burke where worked on issues and policy for mental health, alcohol & drug abuse, HIV-AIDS, and public health, and later worked as a special investigator for Los Angeles County's Auditor-Controller.

Ryu worked at the Kedren Acute Psychiatric Hospital and Community Health Center in South Los Angeles.

=== 2002 attempted rape charge ===
In August 2002, Ryu faced a charge of attempted rape, to which he pleaded not guilty. The case was dismissed before reaching a preliminary hearing when the district attorney's office said it was unable to proceed within the required time.

== Los Angeles City Council ==
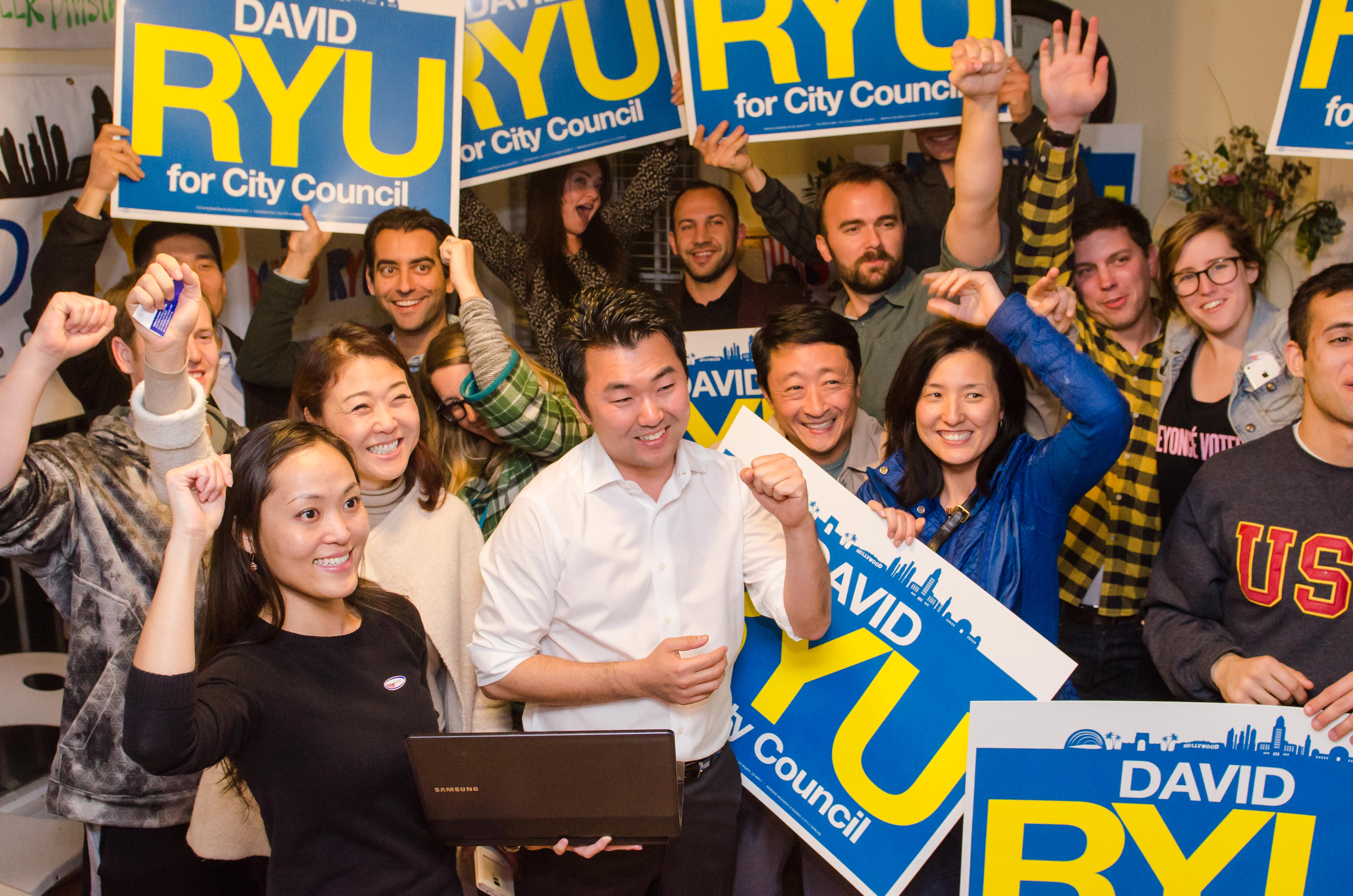
Ryu with supporters after advancing in the primary

=== Elections ===
Ryu was one of over a dozen candidates to replace Councilmember Tom LaBonge, who was term limited. Ryu and Carolyn Ramsay advanced past the March 2015 primary. Ryu defeated Ramsay in the general election, on May 19, 2015. He was ceremonially sworn in on June 29, 2015, and took office on July 1.

In January 2020, Ryu was appointed Assistant City Council President Pro Tempore, becoming the first Asian American to serve on Los Angeles City Council leadership.

In November 2019, the Los Angeles Times reported that despite a campaign pledge not to take money from real estate developers, Ryu's campaign accepted campaign contributions from multiple developers. His campaign later said it would return some of the donations. In the March 3, 2020 primary, Ryu faced urban planner Nithya Raman and screenwriter Sarah Kate Levy. Ryu received 32,298 votes (44.4%), Raman received 31,502 votes (40.8%), and Sarah Kate Levy received 10,860 votes (14.1%).

Because no candidate received over 50 percent of the vote, Raman and Ryu advanced to the runoff election, scheduled for November 3, 2020. In August 2020, the Los Feliz Ledger filed an ethics complaint with the Los Angeles City Ethics Commission after Ryu's campaign office sent an email to 30,000 voters with an allegedly misleading "From:" field. The complaint indicated that the email's "from" field implied that the email was sent by the Ledger itself. The campaign declined to issue a correction. In the November 2020 runoff election, Raman defeated Ryu by a 52.87% to 47.13% margin.

=== Tenure ===
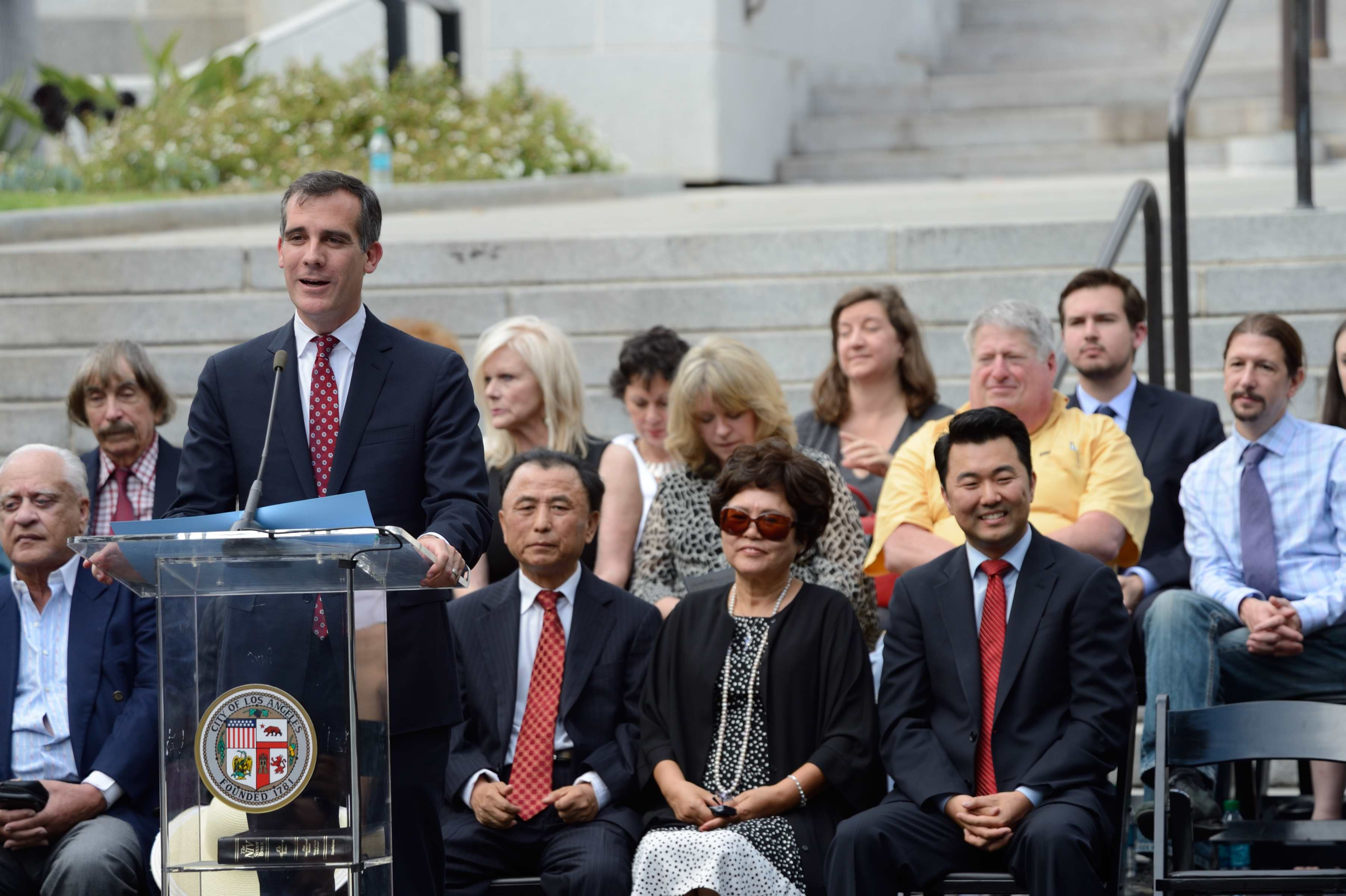
Mayor Eric Garcetti speaking at Ryu's inauguration in 2015

In 2016, Ryu, in partnership with the County of Los Angeles and the Los Angeles Unified School District, supported the development of a children's savings account program for Los Angeles called "Opportunity LA."

In January 2017, Ryu, along with Councilmembers Joe Buscaino and Paul Krekorian, introduced a motion to ban contributions to city elected officials and candidates for city office from developers and their principals with development projects currently or recently before the city, as well as increase matching funds to 6:1 in primary and general elections. In December 2019, the law passed with a unanimous vote from the city council. Critics of the measure argued that the final language contained loopholes, with groups such as the California Clean Money Campaign and California Common Cause arguing that passing it would be "worse than not passing anything at all." Ryu has also introduced legislation to establish an independent Inspector General's office over City Hall, similar to the City of Chicago.

In 2018, Ryu pushed the Los Angeles Police Department to make annual hate crime data open to the public, and for more proactive legislation to protect marginalized communities in Los Angeles.

During Ryu's tenure and with his support, a 100-bed Bridge Housing shelter opened in Los Feliz in July 2020 as part of Mayor Eric Garcetti's "A Bridge Home" program.

In 2015, David Ryu joined wildlife activists to preserve a 17-acre wildlife corridor in Laurel Canyon, pledging to match dollar-for-dollar the money raised by activists with city funds earmarked for parks and green space. The $1.6 million purchase was finalized in 2017 and is now managed by the Mountains Recreation & Conservation Authority.

In 2019, Ryu helped to secure full funding for the Los Angeles LGBT Center's senior center.

Following a protest on May 30, 2020, in the Fairfax district just outside of Council District Four, where Los Angeles police officers were filmed clashing violently with protestors, Ryu and council member Curren Price introduced legislation requesting a "thorough review" of police tactics used by LAPD as well as all complaints filed against LAPD for their use of force during the protest. Ryu also co-introduced legislation to establish an Office of Violence Prevention in Los Angeles to dispatch public health workers to certain situations rather than uniformed police officers.

==== COVID-19 pandemic ====
In the early days of the 2020 COVID-19 pandemic, Ryu negotiated a $1.25 million international deal to bring COVID-19 tests to Los Angeles from South Korean company Seegene, when the United States faced a national testing shortage.

Ryu authored a ban on storage unit evictions during the pandemic, which was passed into law with an urgency clause in June 2020. The law protects storage unit leasees from losing their belongings even if they could not make monthly payments during the pandemic.

In April 2020, Ryu and other councilmembers proposed a rent increase freeze on LA's rent-stabilized units. The freeze was passed into law, but a broader rent freeze on all LA apartments was narrowly voted down.

Political offices
Preceded by Tom LaBonge	Los Angeles City Councilmember, 4th district July 1, 2015 - December 14, 2020	Succeeded by Nithya Raman
Preceded by Joe Buscaino	Assistant President Pro Tempore of the Los Angeles City Council; July 1, 2015 - December 14, 2020	Succeeded by Bob Blumenfield
