= Los Angeles's 4th City Council district =

American legislative district

Councilmember
Nithya Raman; D–Silver Lake
since December 14, 2020
- Demographics: 60.9% White; 4.4% Black; 14.5% Hispanic; 16% Asian; 0.2% Other
- Population (2020): 272,039
- Registered voters (2017): 167,235
- Website: cd4.lacity.gov

Los Angeles's 4th City Council district is one of the fifteen districts in the Los Angeles City Council. It is currently represented by Democrat Nithya Raman since 2020 after she defeated David Ryu in that year's election. The district is situated in Central Los Angeles, the southern San Fernando Valley, and eastern Santa Monica Mountains.

The district was created in 1925 after a new city charter was passed, which replaced the former at-large voting system for a nine-member council with a district system with a 15-member council. In 2021, redistricting processes reshaped the district into its current state, encompassing notable Los Angeles locations like Griffith Park, the Hollywood Bowl, and the Hollywood Sign.

== Geography ==
The majority of the district's area is taken up by the Santa Monica Mountains, with parts of the district stretching north and south into other neighborhoods of Los Angeles. The district encompasses Encino and parts of Reseda in the northwest; Sherman Oaks, southern Van Nuys, and Studio City to the north; Hollywood Hills West, the Hollywood Hills, and a small section of western Hollywood to the south; and Griffith Park, Los Feliz, and a section of northern Silver Lake to the southeast.

It is encompassed in California's 30th and 32nd congressional districts as well as California's 24th, 26th, and 27th State Senate districts and California's 44th, 46th, 51st, and 52nd State Assembly districts.

=== Historical boundaries ===
The district was preceded by the Fourth Ward, which was established in 1878 and added three seats to the Los Angeles Common Council, alongside the fifth ward. It included parts of Los Angeles to the west of the Los Angeles River, including the new neighborhood of Boyle Heights. The district was obsolete when the at-large district was first established in 1889.

In 1889, the ward was re-established as a single-member ward, as part of the passing of the 1888 charter. It elected one member through a plurality vote before the ward became obsolete when the at-large district was re-established again in 1909.

In 1925, the district was created and was originally bounded on the north by Santa Monica Boulevard, east by Vermont or Hoover Avenue, south by Washington Boulevard and west by Western Avenue. It was described later the same year as simply "Wilshire and Pico Heights." In 1928, with "the exception that seven precincts are added to it in the territory bounded by Vermont Avenue and Hoover Street and Sunset Boulevard and Melrose Avenue," the boundaries remained at "Hoover street on the east, Western avenue on the west, Melrose avenue on the north and Washington street on the south."

In 1933, "due to the exceptional growth of the western part of the city, a general movement toward the ocean was necessary." In 1937, it was bounded on the west by Crenshaw Boulevard, on the north by the 5th district and Exposition Boulevard, on the east by the city boundary and on the south by Vernon Avenue. By 1940, the "general trend is westward and northeastward, due to heavy construction in the San Fernando Valley and the beach areas." In 1955, it encompassed "much of the Wilshire district and in general [was] bounded by Fountain Avenue, Wilshire Boulevard, Fairfax Avenue and Catalina Street."

By 1975, it was moved to Central Los Angeles, with the boundaries at Fairfax and Highland Avenues on the west, to Santa Monica Boulevard on the north, the Pasadena Freeway on the east and Olympic Boulevard on the south. In 1986, it was described as "a contorted district that included the old areas as well as Atwater, Griffith Park, Forest Lawn Drive and parts of the central San Fernando Valley to Colfax Avenue and Victory Boulevard." In 1989, the district stretched from Hancock Park to Studio City.

== List of members representing the district ==
=== 1889–1909 ===
Councilmember	Party	Dates	Electoral history
Single-member ward established February 25, 1989
Jacob Frankenfield (South Park)	Republican	February 25, 1889 – December 5, 1890	Elected in 1889. [data missing]
William H. Rhodes (Wilshire Center)	Republican	December 5, 1890 – December 12, 1894	Elected in 1890. Re-elected in 1892. [data missing]
Samuel H. Kingery (Wilshire Center)	Democratic	December 12, 1894 – December 16, 1896	Elected in 1894. [data missing]
Herman Silver (Westlake)	Republican	December 16, 1896 – December 12, 1900	Elected in 1896. Re-elected in 1898. Retired to run for Mayor of Los Angeles.
Pomeroy W. Powers (Alvarado Terrace)	Republican	December 12, 1900 – December 5, 1902	Elected in 1900. Retired to run for Mayor of Los Angeles.
Theodore Summerland (Alvarado Terrace)	Republican	December 5, 1902 – December 13, 1906	Elected in 1902. Re-elected in 1904. [data missing]
Niles Pease (Westlake)	Republican	December 13, 1906 – December 10, 1909	Elected in 1906. Retired.
Single-member ward eliminated December 10, 1909

=== 1925–present ===
Councilmember	Party	Dates	Electoral history
District established July 1, 1925
Boyle Workman (Mid-Wilshire)	Democratic	July 1, 1925 – June 30, 1927	Redistricted from the at-large district and re-elected in 1925. Lost re-election.
William M. Hughes (Harvard Heights)	Independent	July 1, 1927 – June 30, 1929	Elected in 1927. Lost re-election.
Robert L. Burns (Wilshire Center)	Republican	July 1, 1929 – June 30, 1945	Elected in 1929. Re-elected in 1933. Re-elected in 1935. Re-elected in 1937. Re-elected in 1939. Re-elected in 1941. Retired.
Harold A. Henry (Windsor Square)	Republican	July 1, 1945 – May 1, 1966	Elected in 1945. Re-elected in 1947. Re-elected in 1949. Re-elected in 1951. Re-elected in 1953. Re-elected in 1955. Re-elected in 1959. Re-elected in 1963. Re-elected in 1965. Died.
Vacant		May 1, 1966 – May 24, 1966	
John Ferraro (Hancock Park)	Democratic	May 24, 1966 – April 17, 2001	Appointed to finish Henry's term. Elected in 1967. Re-elected in 1971. Re-elected in 1975. Re-elected in 1979. Re-elected in 1983. Re-elected in 1987. Re-elected in 1991. Re-elected in 1995. Re-elected in 1999. Died.
Vacant		April 17, 2001 – November 1, 2001	
Tom LaBonge (Silver Lake)	Democratic	November 1, 2001 – June 30, 2015	Elected to finish Ferraro's term. Re-elected in 2003. Re-elected in 2007. Re-elected in 2011. Retired.
David Ryu (East Hollywood)	Democratic	July 1, 2015 – December 14, 2020	Elected in 2015. Lost re-election.
Nithya Raman (Silver Lake)	Democratic	December 14, 2020 – present	Elected in 2020. Re-elected in 2024.
