= Revolution Prep =

American test preparation company

- Type: Test preparation
- Industry: Internet, Education, Tutoring
- Founded: 2002
- Headquarters: Los Angeles, California, USA
- Revenue: ▲ Unknown
- Website: RevolutionPrep.com

Revolution Prep is an American company that offers test preparation courses, including group classes, private tutoring, and online courses for the SAT and ACT standardized achievement tests.

== History ==
Revolution Prep, based in Santa Monica, California, began in 2002 after founders Ramit Varma and Jake Neuberg met at UCLA's Anderson School of Business. After years of teaching for Kaplan and The Princeton Review, Neuberg and Varma started a company with the goal of improving traditional educational tools and creating new and innovative solutions to academic problems. They created their own SAT Reasoning Test* curriculum along with a program that offers scholarships to students who otherwise could not afford their services. The firm's products and services now address a range of academic areas, including ACT, GRE, high-stakes No Child Left Behind testing, and online education.

In 2010, the firm worked with the Partnership for LA Schools to offer free SAT classes to students at the Santee Educational Complex in Los Angeles, California and was commended in an open letter by Los Angeles Mayor Antonio Villaraigosa.

Revolution Prep does not offer face-to-face individual tutoring, instead providing online SAT and ACT preparation. Additionally, Revolution Prep offers classes on a contract basis. These are held on campus and include fully proctored and timed practice exams.

In June 2010, the firm acquired test prep and admissions consulting company Ivy Insiders.

Revolution Prep has an office in Los Angeles.
