= Unionville =

Unionville is the name of some places in North America:

== Canada ==
- Unionville, Ontario
  - Unionville GO Station, a station in the GO Transit network located in the community
  - South Unionville, a community in Markham, Ontario

== United States ==
- Unionville, Connecticut
- Unionville, Georgia
- Unionville, Illinois (disambiguation)
- Unionville, Indiana
- Unionville, Iowa
- Unionville, Frederick County, Maryland
- Unionville, Michigan
- Unionville, Missouri
- Unionville, Nevada
- Unionville, New Jersey
  - Unionville Vineyards, a winery in Unionville.
- Unionville, New York (disambiguation) (multiple)
- Unionville, North Carolina
- Unionville, Ashtabula County, Ohio; on the border with Lake County
- Unionville, Columbiana County, Ohio
- Unionville, Holmes County, Ohio
- Unionville, Morgan County, Ohio
- Unionville, Washington County, Ohio
- Unionville Center, Ohio
- Unionville, Pennsylvania (disambiguation) (multiple)
- Unionville, South Carolina, historic settlement now named Union, South Carolina
- Unionville, Tennessee
- Unionville, Utah, historic settlement now renamed Hoytsville, Utah
- Unionville, Virginia

== See also ==
- Unienville, a French commune
