= Edward L. Hutchinson =

American lawyer

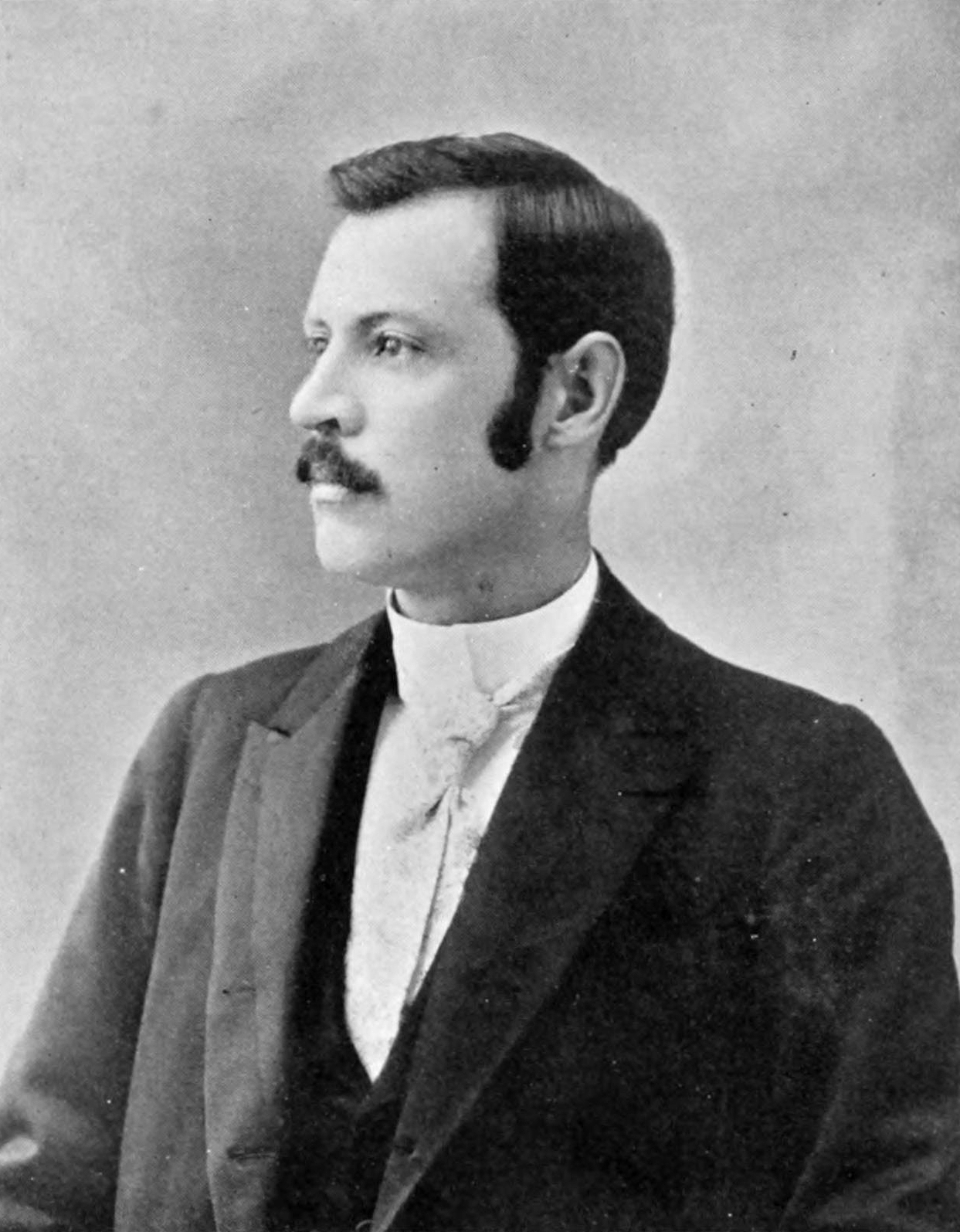
- Hutchinson c. 1898

Member of the Los Angeles City Council for the 8th ward
- In office December 16, 1896 – December 15, 1898
- Preceded by: Thomas F. Savage
- Succeeded by: Robert Asa Todd

Personal details
- Born: July 6, 1864 Parkersburg, West Virginia, U.S.
- Party: Democratic
- Other political affiliations: Populist (1898); Silver Republican (1898)
- Spouse: Maude Ludlow (m. 1903)
- Children: Edward Jr.

Edward L. Hutchinson (born 6 July 1864) was an attorney and a member of the Los Angeles, California, City Council from 1896 to 1898. He was the Democratic-Populist-Silver Republican Fusion candidate for lieutenant governor of California in 1898.

== Personal ==
Hutchinson was born on July 6, 1864, in Parkersburg, West Virginia, the son of David E Hutchinson (born 1831). and Virginia Littleboy Hutchinson (born 1838). His brothers were L.D., Maulby and J.W. Hutchinson.

He attended public school in Unionville, Ohio, from 1870 to 1883 and then Beverly College, a private academy in Athens County, Ohio, in 1884–86. He moved to Los Angeles in 1886 and attended two years at Harvard Night School in that city.

Hutchinson was married on October 15, 1903, to Maude Ludlow in Hanford, California. Their son was Edward L. Hutchinson Jr.

== Vocation ==
He was a teacher at Cabinville School in Bristol, Ohio, in 1885–86, at Pala School in San Diego County in 1889-90 and at Mount Fairview School in San Diego County in 1890. Hutchinson was a principal in Los Angeles City Schools in 1890 and after. He began his law practice in 1899. Among his legal clients was Bartolo Ballerino, known as the "king of the 'crib' district" who ran a string of brothels.

== Organizations and politics ==
In 1893 Hutchinson was a lieutenant and quartermaster in the Seventh Regiment of Infantry in the First Brigade. During his teaching years, he was a member of the Schoomasters Club. As an attorney, he listed his clubs as the Iroquois, Odd Fellows and Knights of Pythias, among others, and his religion as "private creed, not specified." He was the unsuccessful Democratic candidate for lieutenant governor in 1898, for city attorney in 1900 and for State Senate in 1902. In 1904 he was a member of the Good Government League. In 1909 he was one of the incorporators of the Anti-Juggernaut Automobile Club.

Hutchinson was a member of the Los Angeles City Council, representing the 8th Ward, in 1896–98. Known as "the young orator from Los Angeles," he was elected chairman of a Populist convention in Sacramento on July 12, 1898. In that year he was the Populist candidate for lieutenant governor.

== Mining ==
Around 1904, Hutchinson was an investor in a mining company in Smartsville, California.

== Opinions ==
Asked by the Los Angeles Herald in January 1902 to comment on the possibility of allowing "colored women's clubs" to join the General Federation of Women's Clubs, then under discussion, Hutchinson wrote:

I believe in the social equality of equally good people of all races, but social equality does not mean the mixing of society, nor miscegenation, not anything that would or might lead to miscegenation. . . . As a southerner i have seen some of the troubles and discords caused by the mixing of the races . . . I believe in the purity of blood, whether white or colored.

Preceded by Thomas F. Savage	Los Angeles City Council, 1889–1909; 8th Ward; 1896–1898	Succeeded by Robert Asa Todd
