= Los Angeles's 8th City Council district =

American legislative district

Councilmember
Marqueece Harris-Dawson; D–Gramercy Park
since July 1, 2015
- Demographics: 2.0% White; 41.7% Black; 55.2% Hispanic; 2.1% Asian; 0.2% Other
- Population (2020): 259,409
- Registered voters (2017): 136,657
- Website: cd8.lacity.gov

Los Angeles's 8th City Council district is one of the fifteen districts in the Los Angeles City Council. It is currently represented by Democrat Marqueece Harris-Dawson since 2015 after winning an election to succeed Bernard C. Parks, who termed out.

The district was created in 1925 after a new city charter was passed, which replaced the former "at large" voting system for a nine-member council with a district system with a 15-member council. As the city's population expanded to the west, the 8th District's boundaries gradually shifted that way as well.

== Geography ==
The 8th District covers all or a portion of the following neighborhoods: Baldwin Hills, Chesterfield Square, Crenshaw, Jefferson Park, and other communities of western South Los Angeles.

The district overlaps California's 37th and 43rd congressional districts, California's 28th and 35th State Senate districts, as well as California's 55th, 57th, and 61st State Assembly districts.

=== Historical boundaries ===
The district was preceded by the eighth ward, established in 1889 with the passing of the 1888 charter. It included Westlake and Downtown. It elected one member through a plurality vote before the ward became obsolete when the at-large district was re-established again in 1909. The ward had one of the longest serving members before the passing of the 1925 charter, being Republican Everett L. Blanchard who served for fifteen years.

In 1925, the district was created, with the borders of the district at south of Washington Street, north of Jefferson on the western side and north of Slauson Avenue on the eastern side, bounded on the east by Alameda Street and the Vernon city line. A year later, it was bounded by 47th Street, Vermont Avenue, Florence Avenue and Alameda Street. In 1933, due to the "exceptional growth of the western part of the city," the new boundaries were at Central Avenue, Vernon Avenue, Vermont Avenue, and Century Boulevard.

In 1940, the "general trend [was] westward and northeastward, due to heavy construction in the San Fernando Valley and the beach areas." It was bounded on the north by Vernon Avenue, on the west by Western Avenue, on the east by the city limits or Alameda Street and on the south by about Slauson Avenue. In 1955, it bordered on Huntington Park and Vernon, from Vernon Avenue to 94th Street." By this time, a sizable amount of the total population in the district was African American, and their influence would later help Billy G. Mills, one of the first three African Americans to be elected to the City Council, in 1963. In 1964, it was enlarged by absorbing two-thirds of the old 12th District, which was moved to the San Fernando Valley because of the growth of population there.

By 1971, it ran from Adams Boulevard through the south central city to around Century Boulevard, including parts of Watts. By 1975, the district ran in a north-south line in South Los Angeles. It was described as suffering from "some of the worst crime, unemployment and housing problems in the city." In 1992, the district boundaries had shifted west to include Marlton Square on Crenshaw Boulevard. as well as Baldwin Hills.

== List of members representing the district ==
=== 1889–1909 ===
Councilmember	Party	Years	Electoral history
Single-member ward established February 25, 1889
Theodore Summerland (Downtown)	Republican	February 25, 1889 – December 12, 1892	Elected in 1889. Re-elected in 1890. [data missing]
John T. Gaffey (Downtown)	Democratic	December 12, 1892 – March 5, 1894	Elected in 1892. Resigned.
Hugh J. Smith (Downtown)	Democratic	April 23, 1894 – December 12, 1894	Appointed to finish Gaffey's term. [data missing]
Thomas F. Savage (Downtown)	Democratic	December 12, 1894 – December 16, 1896	Elected in 1894. [data missing]
Edward L. Hutchinson (Westlake)	Democratic	December 16, 1896 – December 15, 1898	Elected in 1898. Retired to run for Lieutenant Governor of California.
Robert A. Todd (Westlake)	Democratic	December 15, 1898 – December 8, 1904	Elected in 1898. Re-elected in 1900. Re-elected in 1902. [data missing]
Bernard Healy (Sonoratown)	Republican	December 8, 1904 – December 10, 1909	Elected in 1904. Re-elected in 1906. Redistricted to the at-large district and lost re-election.
Single-member ward eliminated December 10, 1909

=== 1925–present ===
Councilmember	Party	Dates	Electoral history
District established July 1, 1925
Frank L. Shaw (Florence)	Republican	July 1, 1925 – November 28, 1928	Elected in 1925. Resigned when elected to the L.A. County Board of Supervisors.
Vacant		November 28, 1928 – December 3, 1928	
Evan Lewis (South Park)	Republican	December 3, 1928 – May 5, 1941	Appointed to finish Shaw's term. Elected in 1933. Re-elected in 1937. Re-elected in 1939. Announced retirement, then died.
Vacant		May 5, 1941 – July 1, 1941	
Charles A. Allen (Vermont Knolls)	Republican	July 1, 1941 – June 30, 1947	Elected in 1941. Re-elected in 1943. Re-elected in 1945. Lost re-election.
Kenneth Hahn (South Park)	Democratic	July 1, 1947 – June 15, 1953	Elected in 1947. Re-elected in 1949. Re-elected in 1951. Resigned when elected to the L.A. County Board of Supervisors.
Gordon Hahn (South Park)	Republican	June 15, 1953 – June 30, 1963	Appointed to finish his brother's term. Elected in 1953. Re-elected in 1955. Re-elected in 1959. Retired.
Billy G. Mills (Jefferson Park)	Democratic	July 1, 1963 – April 11, 1974	Elected in 1963. Re-elected in 1967. Re-elected in 1971. Resigned when appointed to the Superior Court of California.
Vacant		April 11, 1974 – June 28, 1974	
Robert C. Farrell (Manchester Square)	Democratic	June 28, 1974 – June 30, 1991	Elected to finish Mills's term. Re-elected in 1975. Re-elected in 1979. Re-elected in 1983. Re-elected in 1987. Retired.
Mark Ridley-Thomas (Leimert Park)	Democratic	July 1, 1991 – November 29, 2002	Elected in 1991. Re-elected in 1995. Re-elected in 1999. Resigned when elected to the California State Assembly.
Vacant		November 29, 2002 – July 1, 2003	
Bernard C. Parks (Crenshaw)	Democratic	July 1, 2003 – June 30, 2015	Elected in 2003. Re-elected in 2007. Re-elected in 2011. Retired due to term limits.
Marqueece Harris-Dawson (Gramercy Park)	Democratic	July 1, 2015 – present	Elected in 2015. Re-elected in 2020. Re-elected in 2024.
