= 1900 Los Angeles mayoral election =

- December 3, 1900
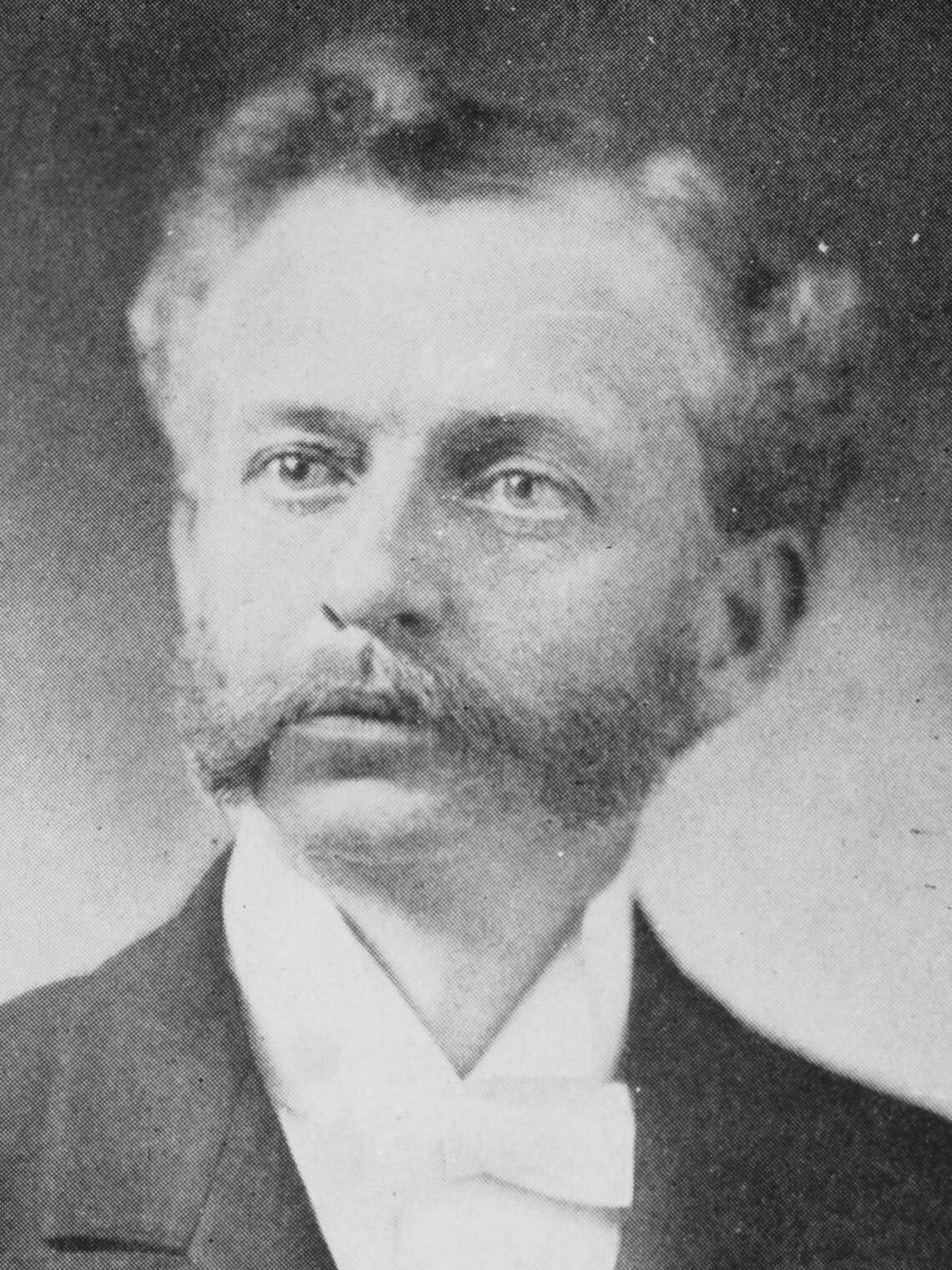

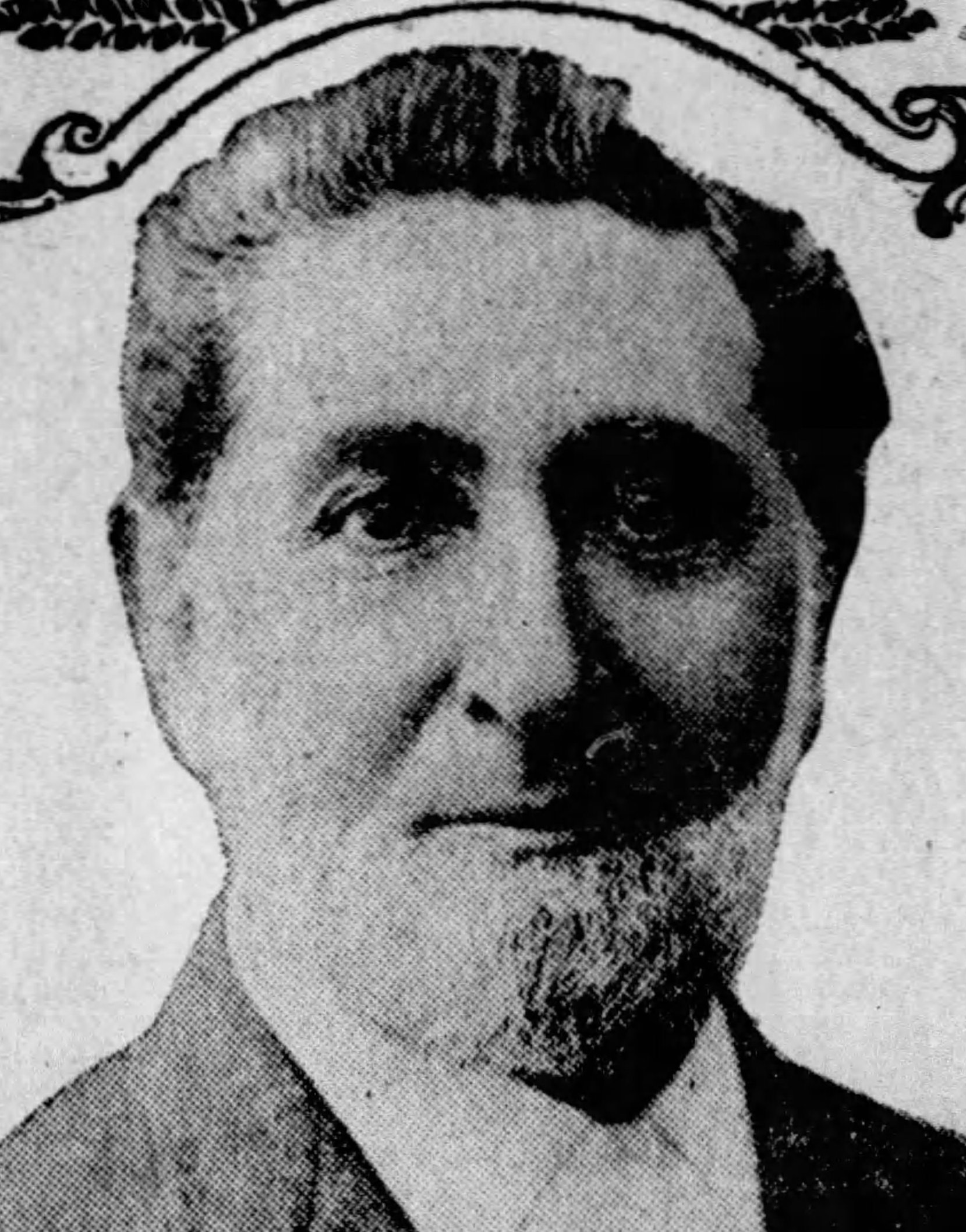
Candidate	Meredith P. Snyder	Herman Silver
Party	Democratic	Republican
Popular vote	10,067	6,946
Percentage	57.71%	39.82%
Mayor before election
Frederick Eaton
Republican
Elected Mayor
Meredith P. Snyder
Democratic

The 1900 Los Angeles mayoral election took place on December 3, 1900. Meredith P. Snyder was elected.

== Results ==
Los Angeles mayoral general election, December 3, 1900
Party	Candidate	Votes	%	±%
Democratic	Meredith P. Snyder	10,067	57.71%	
Republican	Herman Silver	6,946	39.82%	
Social Democratic	Fred C. Wheeler	318	1.82%	
Socialist Labor	James C. Hurley	113	0.65%	
Total votes		17,444	100.00	
Democratic gain from Republican		Swing		
