= 1902 Los Angeles mayoral election =

- December 1, 1902
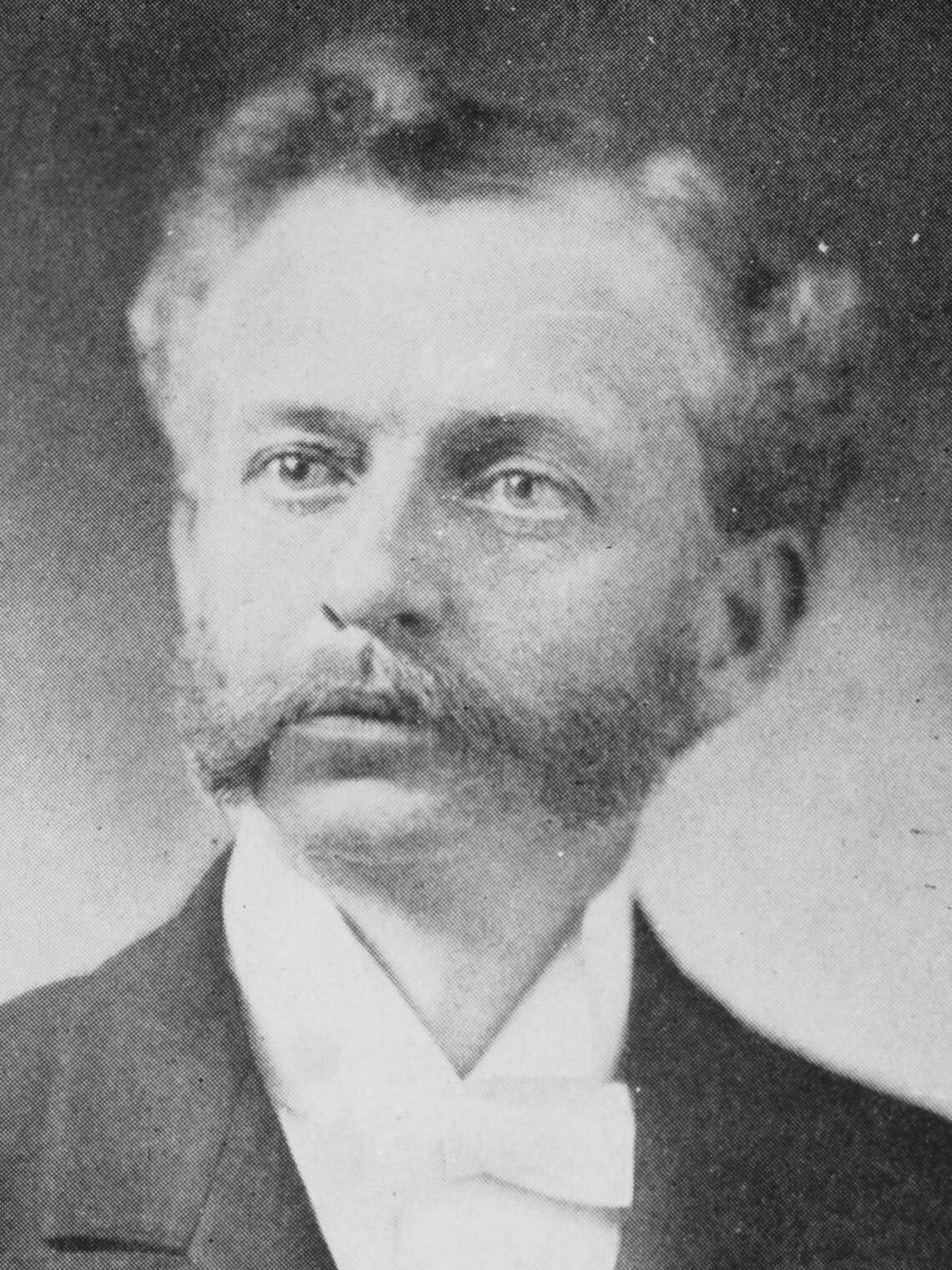

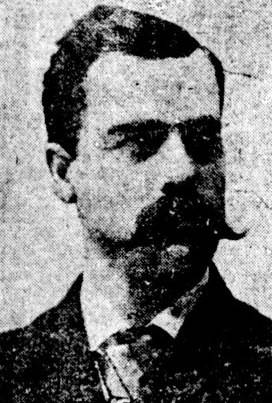

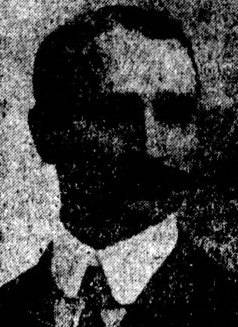
Candidate	Meredith P. Snyder	Pomeroy Wills Powers	George McGahan
Party	Democratic	Republican	Labor
Popular vote	9,472	6,476	3,211
Percentage	48.12%	32.90%	16.31%
Mayor before election
Meredith P. Snyder
Democratic
Elected Mayor
Meredith P. Snyder
Democratic

The 1902 Los Angeles mayoral election was held on December 1, 1902. Incumbent Meredith P. Snyder was re-elected.

== Results ==
Los Angeles mayoral general election, December 1, 1902
Party	Candidate	Votes	%	±%
Democratic	Meredith P. Snyder (incumbent)	9,472	48.12%	−9.59%
Republican	Pomeroy Wills Powers	6,476	32.90%	
Union Labor Party	George McGahan	3,211	16.31%	
Prohibition	Porter	400	2.03%	
Socialist Labor	Harry J. Schade	127	0.65%	
Total votes		19,686	100.00	
Democratic hold		Swing		
