= Hugh J. Smith =

American businessman

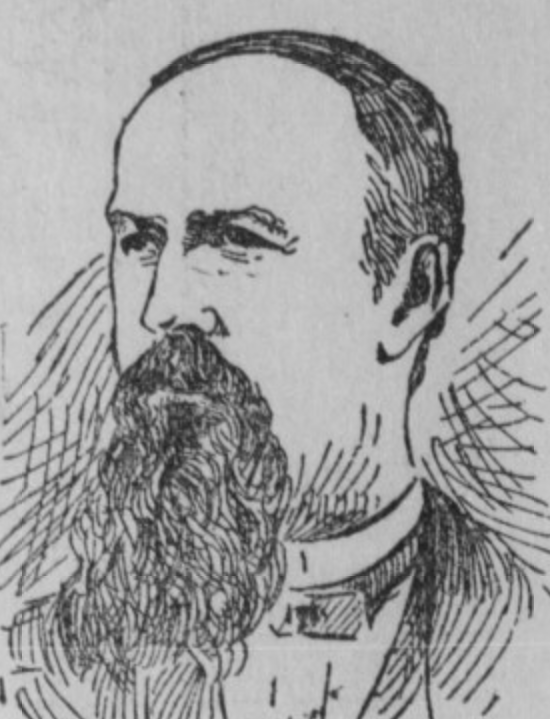
- Smith in 1894

Member of the Los Angeles City Council for the 8th ward
- In office April 23, 1894 – December 12, 1894
- Preceded by: John Tracy Gaffey
- Succeeded by: Thomas F. Savage

Personal details
- Born: 1844 Ireland
- Died: December 29, 1908 (aged 63–64) Los Angeles, California
- Party: Democratic

Hugh J. Smith (1844–1908) was a Los Angeles, California, businessman who was a member of the City Council there in 1894–96.

Smith was born in Ireland, and in 1866 he emigrated to the United States with six of his brothers, and all became farmers in Logan County, Illinois. He moved to Ventura County, California, in 1876 and farmed there for four years on the noted Dixie Thompson ranch for ten years. He then moved to Los Angeles, where he became a "large property owner." He was married in November 1897 at the age of 51 to Bridget Eliza Mitchell, 42, of Vermont.

Smith was appointed in April 1894 to the Los Angeles City Council to represent the 8th Ward upon the resignation of John Tracy Gaffey. He was succeeded by Thomas Savage in December 1894.

He was a member of the Knights of Columbus and treasurer of the Los Angeles chapter of the Ancient Order of Hibernians.

In December 1896 he was a saloonkeeper at Fifth and Los Angeles Streets.

He died on December 29, 1908, in his home at 1102 San Julian Street, "after a long and painful illness." He left his wife, Bridget, and a son, Denis E. Smith.
