= Patrick T. Gaffey =

American politician (1853–1889)

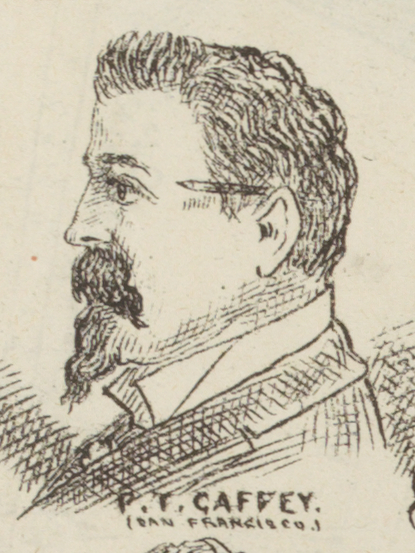
- Sketch by Carl Browne, 1880

Member of the California State Assembly from the 12th district
- In office January 5, 1880 – January 3, 1881
- Preceded by: Multi-member district
- Succeeded by: Multi-member district

Personal details
- Born: 1853 Galway, Ireland
- Died: April 11, 1889 (aged 36) San Francisco, California, U.S.
- Party: Workingmen's (before 1881); Democratic (after 1881)
- Spouse: Minnie C. Kirby (m. 1885; died 1886)
- Relatives: John Tracy Gaffey (brother)
- Occupation: Farmer, salesman, politician

Patrick Tracy Gaffey (1853 – April 11, 1889) was an Irish American farmer, salesman and politician who served in the California State Assembly from 1880 to 1881. He later served as a collector for the city of San Francisco and the San Francisco Harbor Commission. He was active in Workingmen's and Democratic Party politics.

Gaffey married his wife Minnie in 1885; she died less than a year later. His brother was John Tracy Gaffey, a journalist and real-estate speculator who served on the California State Board of Equalization from 1887 to 1891 and the Los Angeles City Council from 1892 to 1894. After his wife's death, Gaffey's health began to decline and John applied to be his legal guardian.
