= Niles Pease =

Los Angeles businessman

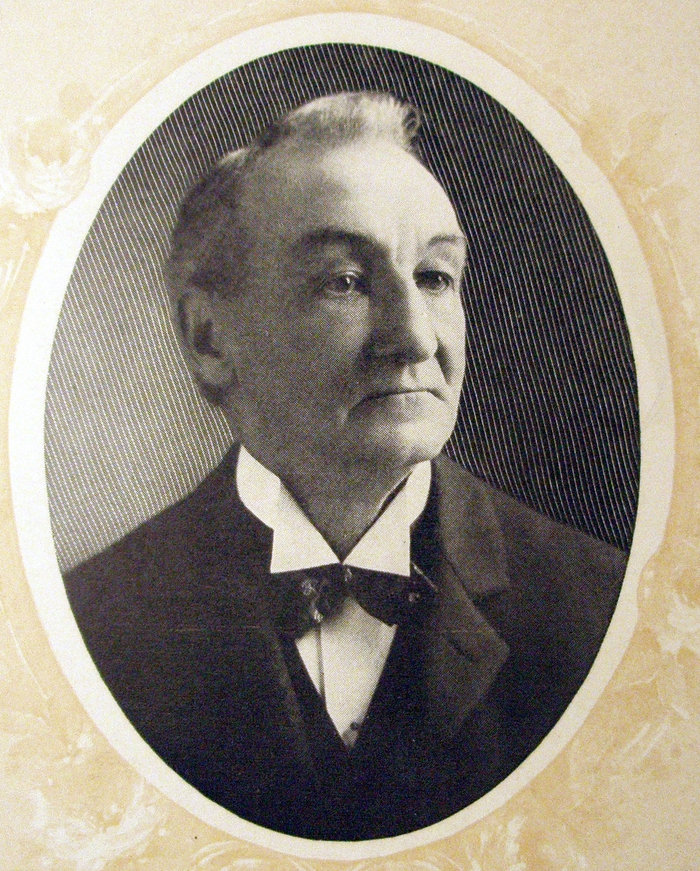

Member of the Los Angeles City Council from the 4th ward
- In office December 13, 1906 – December 10, 1909
- Preceded by: Theodore Summerland
- Succeeded by: District eliminated

President of the Los Angeles City Council
- In office December 13, 1906 – December 10, 1909
- Preceded by: Theodore Summerland
- Succeeded by: John Downey Works

Personal details
- Born: 1838
- Died: 1921 (aged 82–83)
- Children: 6

Niles Pease (1838–1921) was a Los Angeles, California, businessman who was president of the Merchants' and Manufacturers' Association in 1903–05 and of the City Council in 1907–10.

== Life and career ==
Pease was born in Enfield, Connecticut in 1838, where he was engaged in the furniture business for twenty years. He came to Los Angeles in 1884 and for the next two decades was the head of the Pease Furniture Co. At the time of his death on September 21, 1921, he was president of the Niles Investment Company, vice president of the International Indemnity Co. and a director of the Fidelity Savings and Loan Association and of the Bank of Italy. The Pease Building at 7th and Hill streets was later bought by Bullock's Department Store for expansion.

He was a Unitarian, a Knight Templar and a Shriner.

Pease was survived by his wife and four daughters, Grace G. Pease, Jessie F. Pease, Anne Pease, Florence Jones, and two sons, Sherman and Herman Pease.
