= Theodore Summerland =

American politician

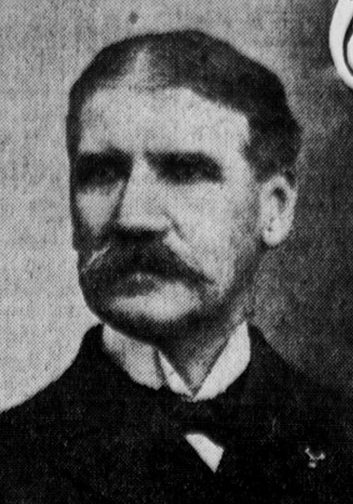
- Summerland in 1905

President of the Los Angeles City Council
- In office December 8, 1904 – December 13, 1906
- Preceded by: William Miller Bowen
- Succeeded by: Niles Pease

Member of the Los Angeles City Council for the 8th ward
- In office February 25, 1889 – December 12, 1892
- Preceded by: District established
- Succeeded by: John Tracy Gaffey

Member of the Los Angeles City Council for the 4th ward
- In office December 5, 1902 – December 13, 1906
- Preceded by: Pomeroy Wills Powers
- Succeeded by: Niles Pease

Los Angeles County Assessor
- In office 1894–1903

Personal details
- Born: September 6, 1853 Carlisle, Pennsylvania
- Died: December 5, 1919 (aged 66) Los Angeles, California
- Party: Republican

Theodore J. Summerland (September 6, 1853 – December 5, 1919) was the Los Angeles County Assessor in 1894–1903 when the California Supreme Court decided that the assessor was not entitled to commissions on the taxes that he collected. He also served two terms on the Los Angeles City Council and was on the California Railroad Commission.

== Personal ==
Summerland was born in Carlisle, Pennsylvania on September 6, 1853. In 1862 he and his family joined his father in Marysville, California, where the latter had been living for several years. They later moved to Santa Clara, California, where Theodore completed secondary school.

He married Estelle Unger of Wilkes-Barre, Pennsylvania, in Los Angeles on July 3, 1907. She had a son, Rex Unger, from a previous marriage.

Theodore Summerland was a Presbyterian, a Republican, and was the first exalted ruler of Elks Lodge No. 99.

The Los Angeles Times reported that it was Summerland's custom "whenever a circus came to town to buy 200 tickets and take all the poor boys he could find. He always went along himself to see that they got their popcorn, peanuts and red lemonade."

Summerland died on December 5, 1919, at Clara Barton Hospital in Los Angeles after a short illness. He was survived by his wife, who was living in San Francisco. Interment was in the Elks' plot in Inglewood Park Cemetery.

== Vocation ==
Summerland was a life insurance agent in private life.

In 1889-92 he was on the Los Angeles City Council, representing the 8th Ward. He ran for the Republican nomination for mayor in 1892, but lost in the convention to J. Q. A. Tufts, even though Summerland had led on the first ballot.

He was later elected Los Angeles County assessor and served 1894–1903. In 1896 Summerfield was on the losing end of a California Supreme Court decision that he was not entitled to a commission for his collection of road, poll and personal property taxes that he had collected in the city and then submitted to the County of Los Angeles. The Los Angeles Times explained:

Assessors in all counties but those of the second class are allowed these commissions, but the [state] statute expressly exempts counties of the second class [as Los Angeles County was then].... The commissions, had they been allowed, would have amounted to $10,000 a year, in addition to the $3600 a year which is the regular salary of the Assessor.

In September 1898, Summerland was engaged in an altercation with another "well-known" politician, W.S. Redding, and was struck on the head with a walking stick, resulting in a "bad gash" to the scalp. The Los Angeles Herald reported that "For some time past there has been ill feeling between the men. . . .[who] met in the Hollenbeck [Hotel] last evening, and lost no time talking, but mixed things up in savage style. Each of the participants claims that the other was the aggressor."

In 1902 he was again elected to the council, this time from the 4th Ward, and he served two terms, until 1906. During 1904-06 he was City Council president.

Summerland was named to the State Railroad Commission, and in 1915 he was a candidate for the county Board of Supervisors from the 4th District.
