= Evan Lewis (politician) =

American politician (1869–1951)

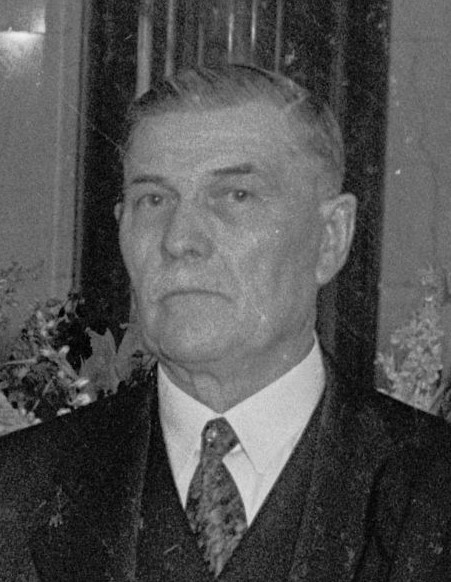
- Lewis in 1935

Member of the Los Angeles City Council for the 8th district
- In office December 3, 1928 – May 5, 1941
- Preceded by: Frank L. Shaw
- Succeeded by: Charles A. Allen

Personal details
- Born: June 2, 1869 Wales
- Died: May 5, 1941 (aged 71) Los Angeles, California, U.S.
- Party: Republican

Evan Lewis (July 2, 1869 – May 5, 1941) was a Welsh-born American politician. He was a member of the Los Angeles, California, City Council between 1925 and 1941.

== Biography ==
Lewis was born in Wales on July 2, 1869, and was taken to Iowa in the United States when young. He became a U.S. citizen in 1890, two years after moving to California. He was at various times a deputy sheriff, a paving contractor and a realty dealer. He and Mary Powell, the daughter of Major E.B. Powell, were married in the Powell home at 2041 East Sixth Street on December 7, 1904, and eventually moved into a house at 268 E. 50th Street near South Park. They had one son, Evan Weldon, who became a deputy district attorney.

Lewis died on while in office on May 5, 1941. A funeral service was held at the Welsh Presbyterian Church, and the body lay in state beneath the rotunda of the new City Hall. Interment followed at Inglewood Park Cemetery.

== Public service ==
=== Elections ===
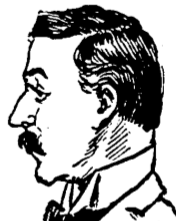
Sketch of Lewis in 1904.

Lewis was nominated for city assessor at a citywide Republican convention on October 28, 1904, and was elected on December 5. He served one two-year term and then went into business for himself as a private assessor. He was on the Planning Commission 1920–25. and in December 1928 he was chosen by the City Council to succeed Frank L. Shaw, who resigned as 8th District councilman when Shaw won his race for the county Board of Supervisors. Lewis was elected repeatedly thereafter but did not run in 1941.

In 1937 the 8th District boundaries were: North: 45th Street or 48th Street. East: Alameda Street. South: Manchester Avenue. West: Vermont Avenue.

=== Positions ===
Lewis was once labeled the "official roarer for the Council. He is fearless in his outbursts, and his thundering attacks upon shady deals that he discovers lurking about the City Hall are classics in the art of strenuous oratory. Brother councilmen who trail with Lewis generally look upon him as a sort of watchdog to raise the alarm upon the approach of a dubious proposition. . . . He fights for what he believes is right until he is the last man on the firing line, and then battles single-handed."

In 1930, he was among six council members who in May 1930 unsuccessfully opposed allocating funds to make a study of leveling Bunker Hill, "which stands as a hindrance to traffic and a bar to development in the northwestern downtown territory."

In 1931, Lewis forced the postponement of a city law that would have allowed smoking in the balconies of theaters. He opined that "We should look into the ventilation feature of this ordinance. Smokers might run everybody else out of the theater. Holes will be burned in clothing, it will increase the fire risk." he also proposed a resolution by which employees of city, county, state and federal governments would contribute a percentage of their salaries to go toward "unemployment relief." Then he added private businesses as well. His idea was referred to a committee. He also voted twice in favor of having the city attorney appeal a judge's decision ordering the city to stop the practice of segregating its swimming pools by race. An appeal would have delayed or halted the desegregation of the pools.

In 1932, when Council Member George W.C. Baker asked for an ordinance to require inspection and certification of raw-milk dairies, Lewis opposed the idea, asserting it was simply a scheme to raise the price of milk.

In 1933, Lewis was a vocal dissenter when the council passed an ordinance fixing a quarterly fee of $37.50 "per chair or space" in tango parlors. He said the action "legalizes open gambling."

In 1934, he proposed doing away with most city commissions, which in that year numbered 19, with 105 members. He wanted "all municipal departments and divisions under the jurisdiction of the City Council," and he urged a reduction in the size of the 15-member council, with members "nominated by the voters in the district but elected by the voters at large." He also attacked "beer parlors" which had painted their windows, claiming that "such an effort at concealment shows that something wrong is going on inside. "Minors couldn't enter a saloon in the old days," he said, "and you never saw a woman standing at the bar. Today you see many women at the bar."

In 1936, he charged that a weekly payoff of $8,750 in protection money was being given to officials by operators of "Chinese lotteries" to allow them to remain open. He again ripped into "games of skill and science" that were to be allowed in the Venice amusement zone, claiming that allowing them there was "nothing but a bold attempt to legalize gambling throughout the entire city." He also opposed a resolution aimed at stronger regulation of the Los Angeles street railway company, claiming that the yellow cars had "the best service in the world." He also urged that the city should employ only people who had been residents for a year and who were registered voters.

In 1940, he loudly berated city health officer George Parrish for his plan to require food markets to "ratproof" their premises. Parrish said there were about 1.5 million rats in the city and each ate about $1.67 worth of food. His department caught 50,000 in 1939, Parrish said.

Preceded by Frank L. Shaw	Los Angeles City Council; 8th District; 1928–33	Succeeded by Charles A. Allen
