= Robert Asa Todd =

American journalist and politician(1870–1943)

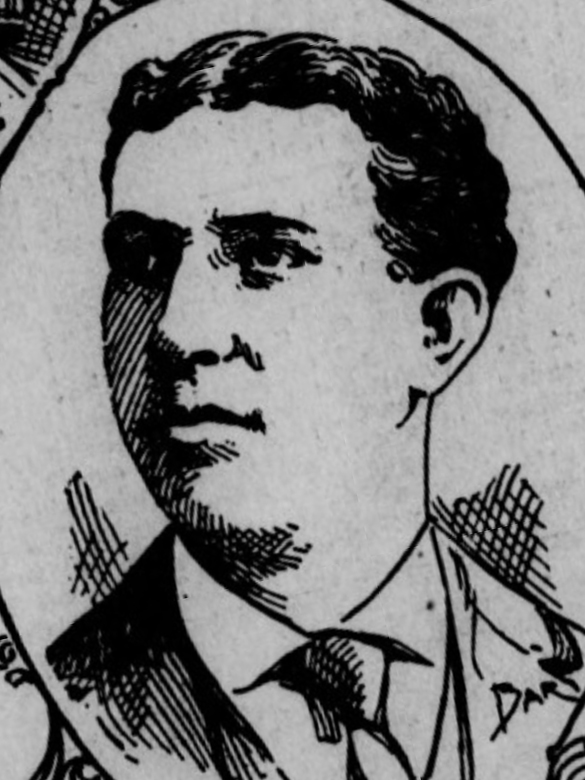
- Todd in 1898

Member of the Los Angeles City Council for the 8th ward
- In office December 15, 1898 – December 8, 1904
- Preceded by: Edward L. Hutchinson
- Succeeded by: Bernard Healy

Personal details
- Born: March 5, 1870 San Bernardino, California
- Died: March 4, 1943 (aged 72) Echo Park, Los Angeles
- Party: Democratic

Robert Asa Todd (March 5, 1870 – March 4, 1943) was a California and Arizona journalist who became a member of the Los Angeles City Council in 1898–1904 and then a deputy city attorney for Los Angeles, California.

== Personal ==
Todd was born on March 5, 1870, in San Bernardino, California, the son of Asa Todd of Los Angeles and Mary Caroline Phyne of Virginia. He was taken to Los Angeles as a child, and he attended Los Angeles High School on Fort Moore Hill and Woodbury's Business College in Los Angeles.

He was married in 1896 at age 28 in Immanuel Presbyterian Church to Minnie F. Reinert of Los Angeles, age 22. They had one child, Frances (Mrs. Howard Torkelson).

Todd was a life member of Al Malaikah Shrine, a director of the Los Angeles County Pioneer Society and president of Ramona Parlor, Native Sons of the Golden West, of which he was president in 1898.

Todd died on March 4, 1943, at Queen of Angels Hospital after an operation, leaving his widow, Helen G. Todd of 1710 West Sixth Street, and a daughter, Frances Torkelson of San Antonio, Texas, and two grandchildren. Interment was in Inglewood Park Mausoleum.

== Vocation ==
=== Journalism ===
In 1889, Todd was the Los Angeles City Hall reporter for the Los Angeles Star, then moved to Tucson, Arizona, where he for two years he was city editor for the Tucson Star. Afterward, he was a reporter with the San Diego Union, and in 1893 he returned to Los Angeles, where he became city editor for the Los Angeles Express. Los Angeles Mayor Meredith P. Snyder made Todd his secretary and clerk in 1896.

=== Politics ===
In Arizona, Todd was the secretary of the Arizona Territorial Democratic Convention and a member of the executive committee of the Democratic Central Committee of Pima County.

Todd was elected to the Los Angeles City Council in 1898, representing the 8th Ward; he served until 1904. On the council, he sponsored a measure that would have established a hospital in the city to treat smallpox cases. "It is an injustice to quarantine a whole boarding or lodging house because a case of smallpox has been discovered.. . . . The city has spent enough money in guard hire in the last year to more than pay for the erection of a detention hospital."

=== Legal practice ===
While in the City Council, Todd studied privately under the direction of W. B. Matthews, who was then the city attorney. On October 25, 1903, he was admitted to the California State Bar, having passed a "stiff" examination before the California Supreme Court. He was examined by Justice Walter Van Dyke and was vouched for by attorneys Herbert Goudge, Mathews, W.E. Dunn and Frank Flint.

One of the notable cases he argued as a private attorney was in opposition to the initiative section of a new Los Angeles city charter, which, he said, was unconstitutional "in that it attempts to provide for legislation by a direct vote of the people instead of by representatives of the people elected for that purpose and is therefore inconsistent with a republican form of government."

He also represented twelve of the 26 "Japanese" who appeared before the city's police commission to seek restaurant liquor licenses. He suggested that the secretary of the Japanese Association, "which represents the better element of Japanese," be consulted.

In 1933 or 1936 he became a deputy city attorney. He retired in March 1940.
