= Jacob H. Neff =

American politician

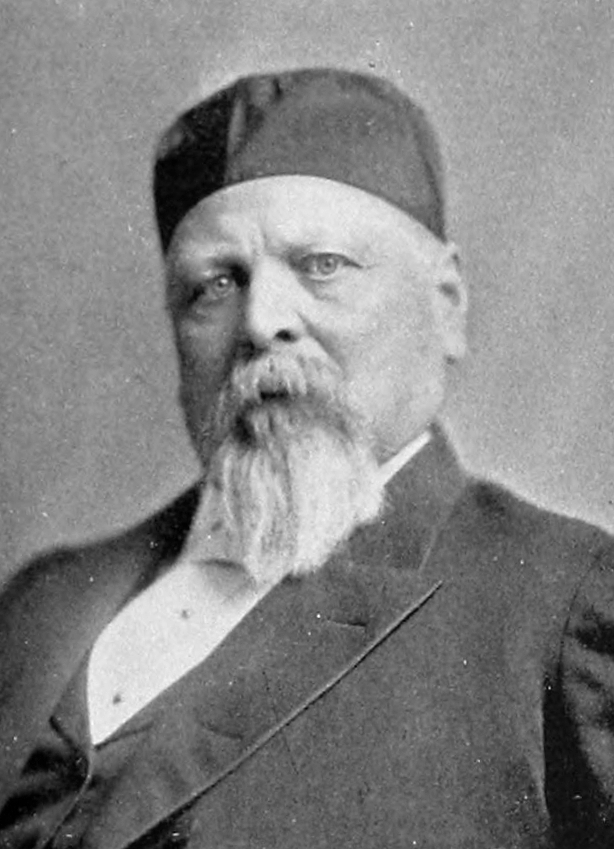
- Neff c. 1898

22nd Lieutenant Governor of California
- In office January 3, 1899 – January 6, 1903
- Governor: Henry Gage
- Preceded by: William T. Jeter
- Succeeded by: Alden Anderson

Member of the California Senate from the 20th district
- In office December 4, 1871 – April 1, 1872
- Preceded by: Charles Austin Tweed
- Succeeded by: Noble Martin

Personal details
- Born: October 18, 1830 Strasburg, Pennsylvania, US
- Died: March 26, 1909 (aged 78) San Francisco, California, US
- Party: Republican

Jacob Hart Neff (October 18, 1830 – March 26, 1909) was an American politician. He served as the 22nd lieutenant governor of California from 1899 to 1903.

== Personal information ==
Neff was born in Strasburg, Pennsylvania, on October 18, 1830. His parents later moved their family to Iowa, where Neff completed his education and learned the blacksmith trade. In 1849, he moved to California. As an adult, Neff resided primarily in Placer County, where he had large mining interests.

== Early years ==
Neff moved to California during the 1849 gold rush, and he worked as a miner until 1863, when he had accumulated enough capital to become involved in other business ventures, including ownership stakes in several mines, construction of a toll road and bridge across the Bear River, and a general store in Dutch Flat Station.

== Career ==
Neff was elected sheriff of Placer County in 1867. From 1871 to 1876, he was in the state senate. After completing his senate term, he carried out an appointment as a member of the federal commission tasked with inspecting the new Oregon-California Railroad. Beginning in 1877, he served for 10 years on the board that oversaw California's state prisons. For many years he was the president of the California Miners' Association.

He served as chairman of three Republican state conventions, and in 1898 was the successful Republican nominee for lieutenant governor. He served from 1899 to 1903, after which he retired.

== Retirement and death ==
Neff resided in San Francisco after retiring. He died there on March 26, 1909, at the age of 78. He was buried in Section E of Woodlawn Memorial Park Cemetery in Colma.

Political offices
Preceded by William T. Jeter	Lieutenant Governor of California; 1899 – 1903	Succeeded by Alden Anderson
