= John Tracy Gaffey =

American journalist and politician (1860–1935)

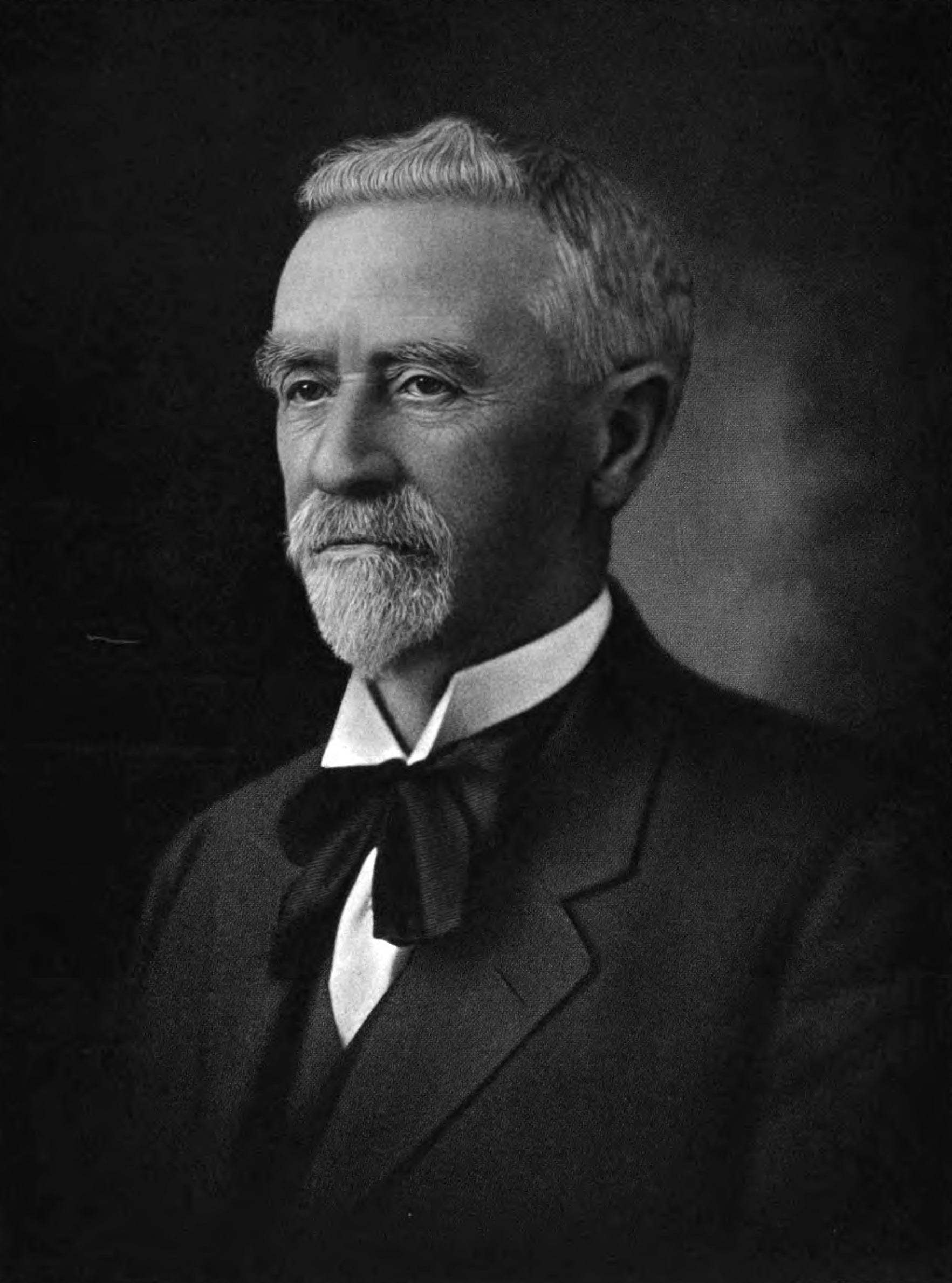
- Gaffey c. 1916

Member of the Los Angeles City Council for the 8th ward
- In office December 12, 1892 – March 5, 1894
- Preceded by: Theodore Summerland
- Succeeded by: Hugh J. Smith

Member of the California State Board of Equalization from the 4th district
- In office January 8, 1887 – January 8, 1891
- Preceded by: John Markley
- Succeeded by: James R. Hebbron

Personal details
- Born: November 1, 1860 Galway, County Galway, Ireland
- Died: January 9, 1935 (aged 74) San Pedro, Los Angeles, U.S.
- Party: Democratic
- Other political affiliations: Workingmen's (1879)
- Spouse: Arcadia Bandini (m. 1887)
- Children: John; Margaret
- Relatives: Patrick T. Gaffey (brother); Abel Stearns (uncle-in-law); Arcadia Bandini de Stearns Baker (aunt-in-law); Juan Bandini (grandfather-in-law)

John Tracy Gaffey (November 1, 1860 – January 9, 1935) was an Irish American journalist, politician, real-estate speculator and investor who served on the California State Board of Equalization from 1887 to 1891 and the Los Angeles City Council from 1892 to 1894. He was involved in the foundation of the Los Angeles Harbor and is the namesake for Gaffey Street in San Pedro.

== Personal ==
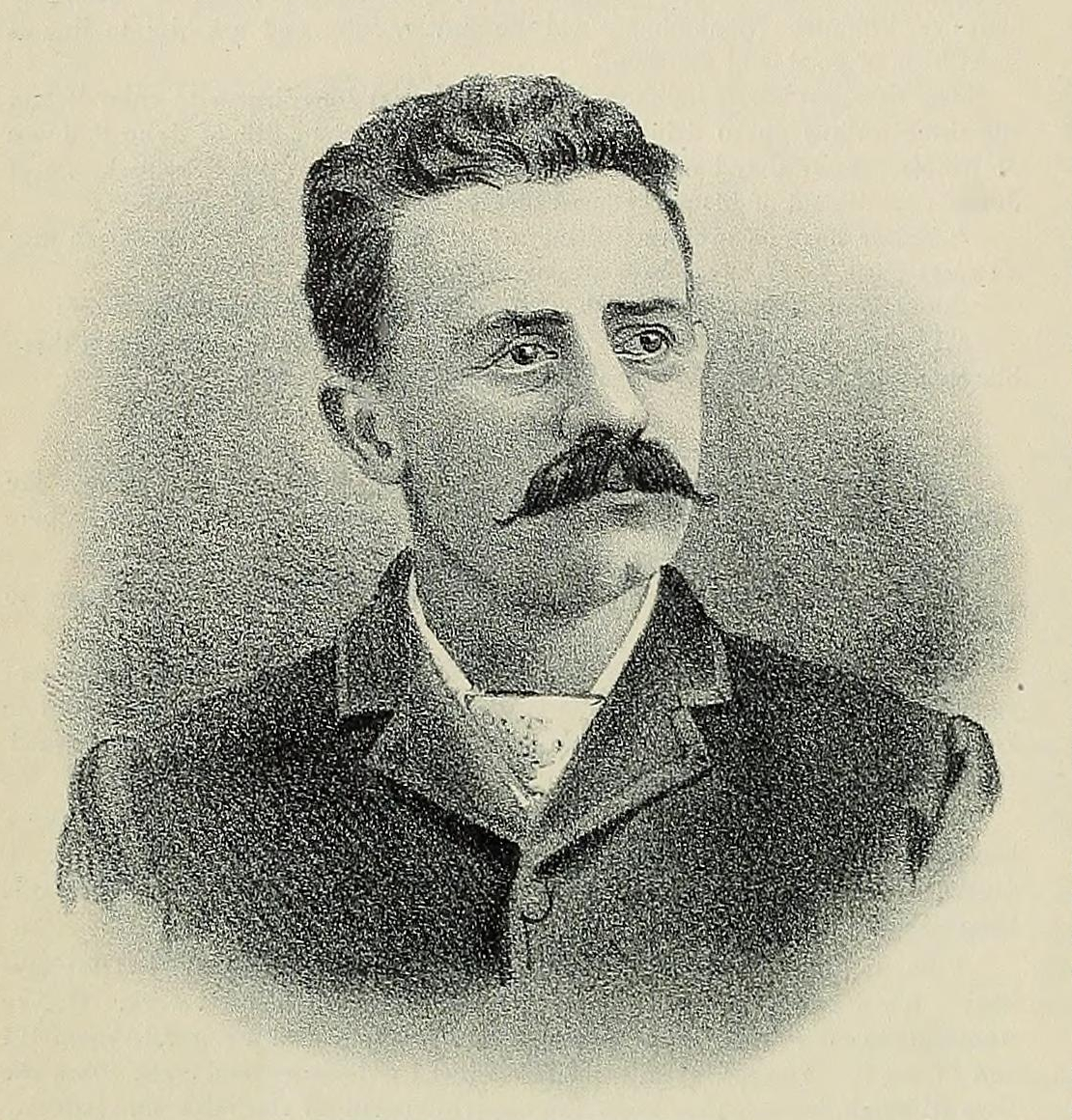
Illustration of Gaffey published in The Wasp, July 5, 1890

Gaffey was born on November 1, 1860 in Galway, Ireland, the son of Thomas Gaffey and Ann E. Tracy. His father died when the boy was 5 years old. His oldest brother, William, became wanted by the authorities for sedition because of his beliefs regarding Irish independence, and so and his family, headed by a widow with seven children, emigrated to California in 1866-67 via the Isthmus of Panama. They pioneered near Santa Cruz on a cattle and sheep ranch, later moving to San Francisco, where Gaffey went to high school and then spent a year at the University of California, Berkeley.

He married Arcadia Bandini in St. Vibiana's Cathedral on June 1, 1887. Her mother was Esperanza de Sepulveda, her uncle was landowner Abel Stearns, her aunt was Arcadia Bandini de Stearns Baker, and her grandfather was pioneer Juan Bandini. They had two children, John and Margaret (Mrs. John Mell).

A Catholic, Gaffey was a founder of the California Club of Los Angeles and was a member of the Bohemian Club of San Francisco and the Tuna Club of Catalina Island. He was a member of the Los Angeles County Democratic Central Committee, the Federated Tax Reduction Leagues of the county and the Free Harbor League.

Around 1904 or 1905 he moved the family from Los Angeles to San Pedro, where he built a rustic ranch house in 1906, at 1131 West Third Street. He later moved that house across the street and on the first lot he built a three-story homet, which he named Hacienda La Rambla. It was razed in 1964 for the construction of a YMCA building.

Gaffey died January 9, 1935, in his home. He was survived by a son, W. Casey Gaffey of San Pedro, and a daughter, Mrs. Margaret Kilroy of Santa Monica. Burial was slated for Valley Church in Watsonville, California. He left an estate valued at $236,000.

== Vocation ==
At the age of 20, Gaffey became a reporter with the Santa Cruz Courier. In 1879, he founded a short-lived newspaper called the Santa Cruz Herald. He joined the Workingmen's Party of California and served as undersheriff of Santa Cruz County from 1880 to 1883. His brother Patrick was elected to the State Assembly in 1879. Later, he became a law clerk for the California Supreme Court. In 1892 he was manager for Stephen M. White in his successful campaign for election to the U.S. Senate by the California State Legislature. In 1893, he became the first editor of the Los Angeles Herald.

Gaffey was a member of the California State Board of Equalization from 1887 to 1891, the Los Angeles City Council from 1892 to 1894, and was collector of customs from 1890 to 1893. He had mining interests in Mexico, oil interests in Texas and real-estate holdings. He played a major role in the founding of the Los Angeles Harbor in San Pedro.

== Legacy ==
In San Pedro, Gaffey Street was named after him, and a plaque memorializes him in the Gaffey Building, where he had his office, 333 West Sixth Streety.
