= Marqueece Harris-Dawson =

American politician (born 1969)

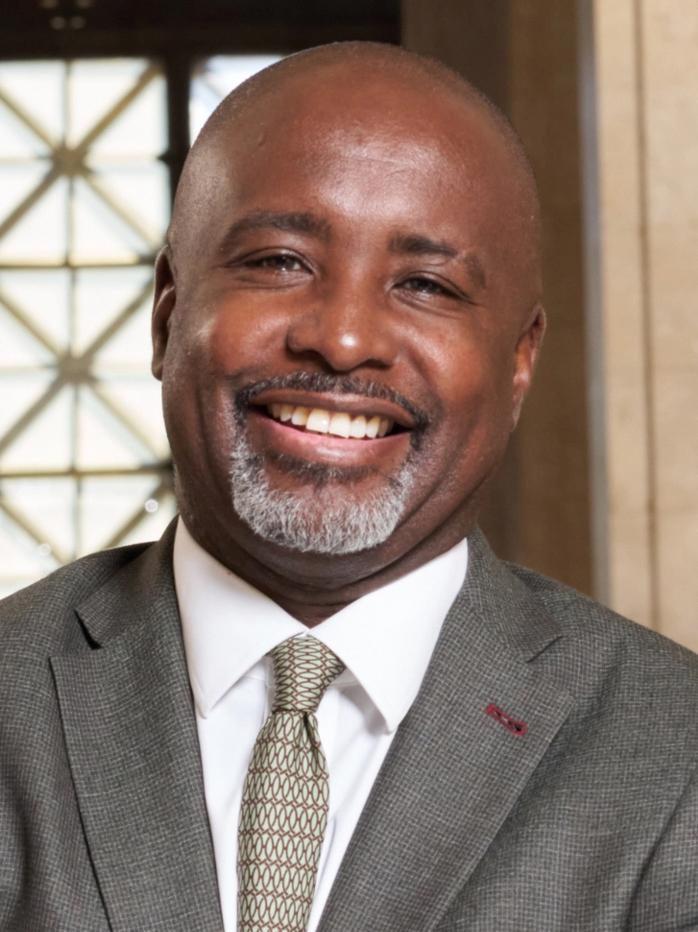
- Official portrait, 2024

President of the Los Angeles City Council
- Incumbent
- Assumed office September 20, 2024
- Preceded by: Paul Krekorian

President pro tempore of the Los Angeles City Council
- In office June 20, 2023 – September 20, 2024
- Preceded by: Curren Price
- Succeeded by: Bob Blumenfield

Member of the Los Angeles City Council from the 8th district
- Incumbent
- Assumed office July 1, 2015
- Preceded by: Bernard Parks

Personal details
- Born: November 7, 1969 (age 57) Los Angeles, California U.S.
- Party: Democratic
- Education: Morehouse College (BA)
- Website: Official website

Marqueece L. Harris-Dawson (born November 7, 1969) is an American politician, currently serving as the president of the Los Angeles City Council since September 20, 2024. A member of the Democratic Party, who has represented the 8th district of the Los Angeles City Council since 2015.

== Early life and education ==
Marqueece Harris-Dawson grew up in South Los Angeles and was raised in the Black church. He graduated from Morehouse College with a bachelor's degree and majored in Political Science and Mathematics. He holds a certificate in Nonprofit Management from Stanford's Graduate School of Business and is also an Aspen Institute Pahara Fellow.

== Career ==
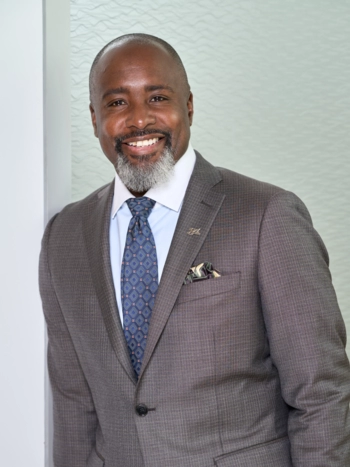
Official portrait

=== Community Coalition Substance Abuse Prevention and Treatment ===
Harris-Dawson joined the Community Coalition in 1995, recognized as one of the most progressive non-profits in the country. In 2004 he succeeded U.S. Congresswoman Karen Bass as President and CEO of the organization and influenced the community through several key pieces of legislation.

In 2006, the Community Coalition advocated for foster care funding in the state budget, securing $82 million to improve the foster care system and $36 million for kinship care. The organization also established the Ex-Offender Task Force to advocate for the removal of the lifetime ban on drug felons' access to public assistance. They collaborated with Assemblymember Diane Watson to craft a bill to remove these bans, which was signed by Governor Arnold Schwarzenegger in 2005.

The Community Coalition analyzed the distribution of tax bonds and found it was unevenly distributed. In 1997, Proposition BB allocated additional funds to LAUSD schools. Through youth organizing, they secured an additional $153 million to address priority repairs in overcrowded schools.

In 2000, the Community Coalition's youth organization launched a campaign to advocate for access to A-G college preparatory classes in all LAUSD schools. In 2005, the LAUSD Board of Education passed the historic A-G Resolution, mandating that A-G college preparatory curriculum be made available in all LAUSD schools starting in 2008. In 2000, the Community Coalition's youth organization launched a campaign to advocate for access to A-G college preparatory classes in all LAUSD schools.[6] In 2005, the LAUSD Board of Education passed the historic A-G Resolution, mandating that A-G college preparatory curriculum be made available in all LAUSD schools starting in 2008.[6] This policy change provided students in South LA with a pathway toward college, addressing the inequities in education that had previously made this nearly impossible.

Additionally, the Community Coalition played a major role in the School Climate Bill of Rights, which reformed LAUSD suspension policies and led to the beginning of restorative justice policies in public schools.

=== Los Angeles City Council ===
In 2015, Harris-Dawson was elected to represent the Eighth District of Los Angeles, an area home to over 248,000 people, including a significant population of African-American and Latino households. He was elected by 62% of the vote in 2015, ran unopposed in his 2020 campaign, and won by 78% against two other candidates in 2024.

In response to the 2020 George Floyd Uprisings, Harris-Dawson supported a reallocation of LAPD funding for community-led public safety investments. For the first time in LA's history, $150 million was reallocated from the LAPD budget towards public programming. $4.2 million was allocated to Council District Eight for the office to support 57 South LA organizations through community grants. Harris-Dawson also introduced two police reform policies one exploring an unarmed crisis response program diverting responses from LAPD to mental health professionals and another to develop an unarmed traffic enforcement program in Los Angeles.

==== Legislative Achievements ====
Within his first 18 months as a Councilmember, Harris-Dawson authored Proposition HHH, a $1.2 billion bond for permanent supportive housing, marking the largest investment toward ending homelessness in the nation.

Harris-Dawson has introduced various policies to combat homelessness, create quality jobs, clean streets, and encourage community policing. He has leveraged $1.7 billion in federal, state, and Metro funding to address disinvestment and revitalize streetscapes in South LA.

Public safety reform has also been a key initiative of his administration. Following the 2020 George Floyd uprisings, Harris-Dawson co-introduced several legislative efforts calling for police reform, including policies for Unarmed Crisis Response and Unarmed Traffic Enforcement.

==== Homelessness, Public Safety, Economic Initiatives ====
Harris-Dawson co-authored Proposition HHH, which aims to address homelessness, and led efforts for a Community Safety Partnership between the community and the Los Angeles Police Department.

During the 2020 pandemic, he created the Senior Meals Program to support the local business community while assuring the most vulnerable population in the district, seniors, were provided with regular meal delivery. During this program 2,200 seniors were fed with a total of 56,785 meals distributed. This program partnered with 32 South LA businesses and provided them with income during the COVID-19 lockdown. The program was a model for the citywide emergency senior meals program, and later, the State of CA.

Climate and Environment

In October 2022, Harris-Dawson co-introduced a resolution unanimously approved by the LA City Council to endorse the Plant-Based Treaty, a global initiative to address greenhouse gas emissions from animal agriculture.

=== Destination Crenshaw ===
When the Metro train connector to LAX was planned to go above ground, potentially dividing the Crenshaw Corridor, Harris-Dawson saw it as an economic opportunity and a place-keeping strategy. Where the Metro would go above ground he envisioned the first enclave dedicated to the African-American experience in Los Angeles, similar to other cultural districts in the city. This initiative led to the construction of Destination Crenshaw, a 1.3-mile public outdoor art museum along the boulevard, featuring notable Los Angeles artists and muralists, to narrate the African American experience in Los Angeles.

=== Community Safety Partnership ===
Councilmember Marqueece Harris-Dawson has been a pivotal figure in promoting the Community Safety Partnership (CSP), an initiative aimed at enhancing public safety through a collaborative approach involving community members and law enforcement. Initially launched as a pilot program to address a public safety crisis at a neighborhood recreation center, CSP has evolved into a permanent fixture for the LAPD and the City of Los Angeles. On September 17, 2022 the Harvard Park Community Safety Advisory Council celebrated five years of CSP at Jackie Tatum Harvard Park, highlighting the program's achievements and challenges.

CSP integrates gang interventionists and preventionists via the Mayor's Office of Gang Reduction and Youth Development (GRYD), offering comprehensive programs targeting all community members, from youth to seniors. This inclusive approach has significantly transformed the neighborhood's atmosphere, eliminating homicides and reducing violent crime by nearly 50% over five years.

Initially launched as a pilot program to address a public safety crisis at a neighborhood recreation center, CSP has evolved into a permanent fixture for the LAPD and the City of Los Angeles. Harris-Dawson's leadership has been crucial in expanding the program's reach and efficacy, with a particular focus on building relationships and strengthening community ties through relationship-based policing.

The program has been lauded for its success in reducing crime and improving community-police relations. However, it has also faced criticism. Activists, including those from Black Lives Matter-Los Angeles, argue that expanding CSP effectively redirects funds back to the police, rather than investing in alternative community-based services that might address social issues more effectively. Critics claim that while CSP aims to foster trust, many residents still harbor deep mistrust of the police and are concerned about potential mistreatment.

Despite these criticisms, Harris-Dawson remains committed to CSP as part of a broader strategy to reform public safety. He has advocated for leveraging significant federal, state, and local funding to revitalize South LA, addressing disinvestment, and supporting crime prevention through robust partnerships with law enforcement, community organizations, and social service providers. This approach aims to create safe, thriving neighborhoods and enhance public safety, civic participation, and community development in areas like Harvard Park.

=== Leaked Audio Tapes ===
In response to the 2022 scandal, then-Councilmember Harris-Dawson introduced and seconded various motions calling for Nury Martinez's removal from the position of council president, the removal of all three council members from their committees, and their censure. He also introduced a motion calling for a charter amendment to strengthen the outcomes of a council censure.

Additionally, he has advocated for an independent redistricting commission by opening up the charter for full reform. The support of an independent redistricting commission will be on the November 2024 ballot.

=== Leadership Positions ===
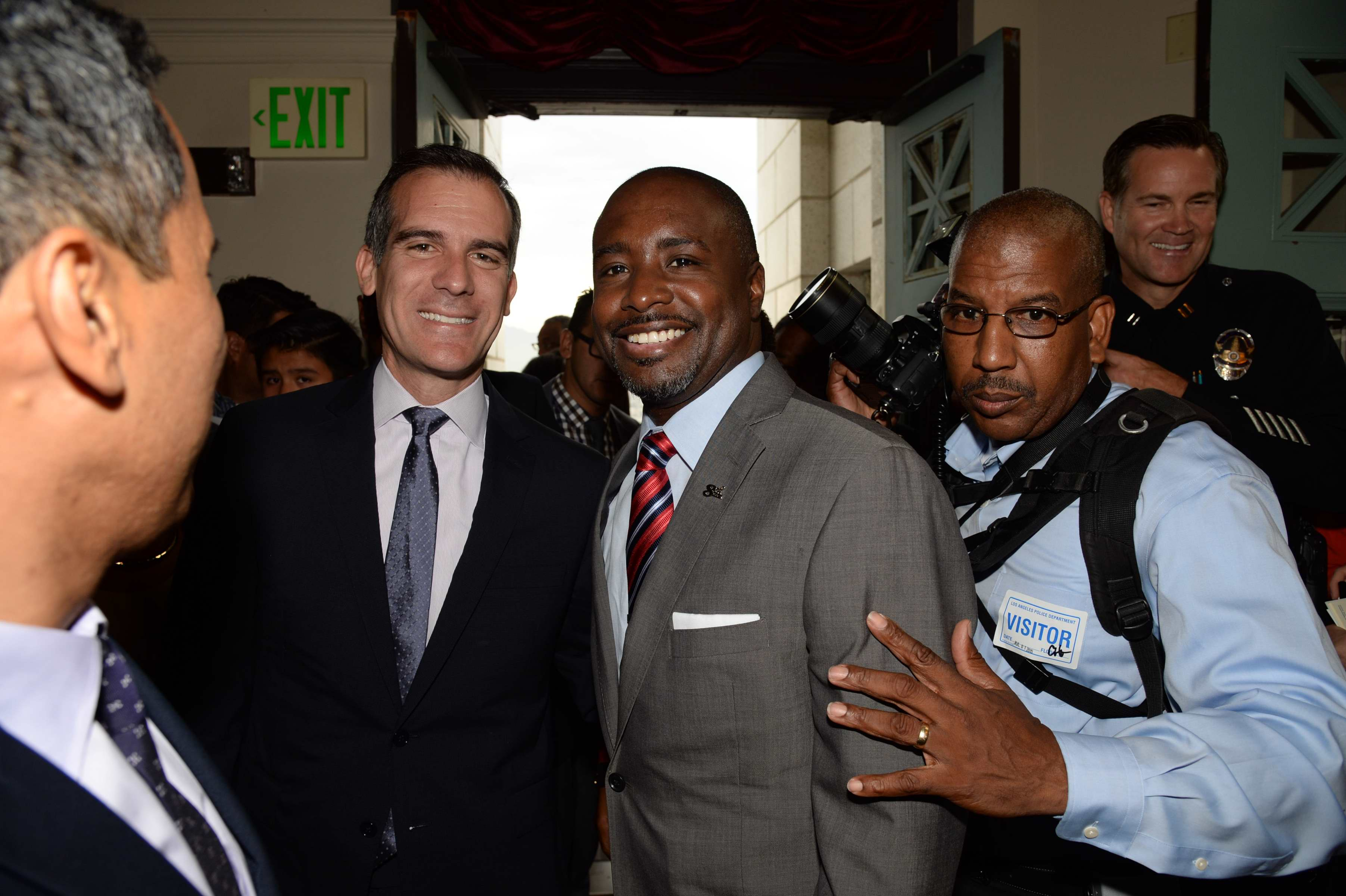
Harris-Dawson with Mayor Eric Garcetti after taking his oath of office in 2015.

In 2023, the sitting council president pro tempore stepped down from their position due to an embezzlement investigation. The council nominated and unanimously elected Harris-Dawson to fill the position.

In June 2024, Harris-Dawson was unanimously elected, 14-0, to serve as Council President beginning September 20th, 2024.

In January 2025, Harris-Dawson was acting-mayor during the January 2025 Southern California wildfires, filling in for Karen Bass who was in Accra, Ghana for a ceremonial diplomatic mission.

== Awards and honors ==
Councilmember Harris-Dawson has received numerous awards, including:

- Do Something "BRICK" Award
- The Wellness Foundation Sabbatical Award
- NAACP Man of Valor Award
- Durfee Foundation's Stanton Fellowship
- Liberty Hill Foundation's Upton Sinclair Award
- InnerCity Struggle Esteban E. Torres Award
- The YMCA Community Champion Award

He also served as a board member for the Liberty Hill Foundation.

== Personal life ==
Harris-Dawson resides in South Los Angeles with his wife, Karrie. Aside from his work in the nonprofit and public sectors he has an avid interest in history and music. Harris-Dawson is also a longtime vegetarian.

Political offices
Preceded by Curren Price	President pro tempore of the Los Angeles City Council; 2023–2024	Succeeded by Bob Blumenfield
Preceded by Paul Krekorian	President of the Los Angeles City Council; 2024–present	Incumbent
