= Bernard Healy =

American politician

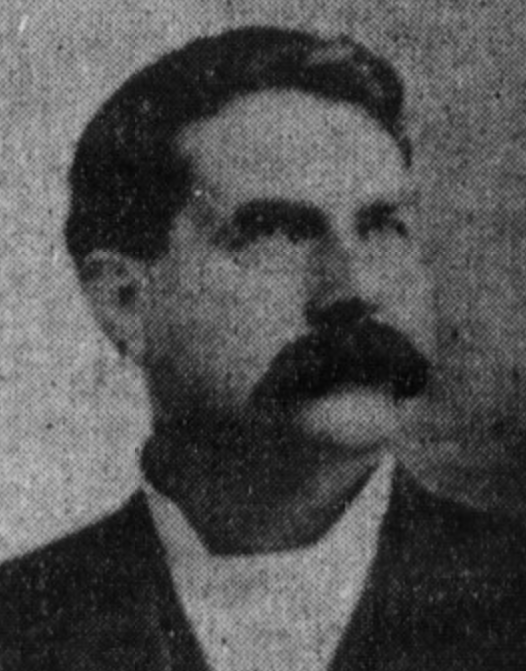
- Healy in 1906

Member of the Los Angeles City Council for the 8th ward
- In office December 8, 1904 – December 10, 1909
- Preceded by: Robert Asa Todd
- Succeeded by: District eliminated

Personal details
- Born: 1856 Wheeling, West Virginia
- Died: October 22, 1916 (aged 59–60)
- Party: Republican

Bernard Healy (1856 – October 22, 1916) was a Los Angeles City Council member who was known for his attempt in 1905 to legislate against landlords who refused to rent to families with children, for his support of paid holidays for city workers in the parks and streets departments, and for his large family.

== Personal ==
Healy was born in Wheeling, West Virginia and was married in Arizona about 1880, becoming the father of eight to ten children, including a set of twins. He was a non-commissioned officer in the United States Army "during many of the uprisings along the frontier."

== Government service ==
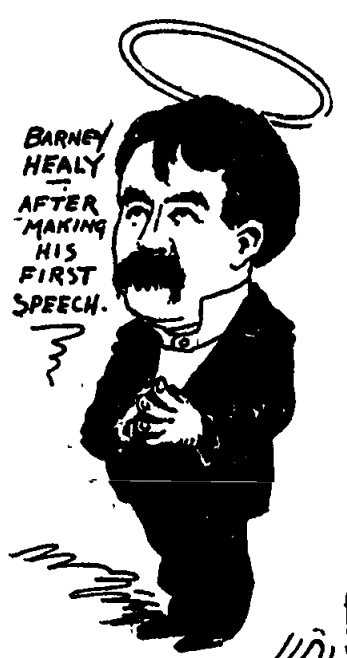
Healey as seen by a Los Angeles Times artist.

Healy was a City Council member between 1904 and 1909, when he was described as a "kindly, good-natured man of large family and patriotic impulses." The Los Angeles Herald said of him in 1907 that he was "the most picturesque character in the present council. He is known as "Buttermilk Barney," as he is an abstainer, is always clad in green and wears no neckties."

He represented the Eighth Ward on the east side of the city, which the Times called "the ward with the greatest percentages of the saloon vote," the newspaper noting that Healy "was an uncompromising Republican" in "the strongest Democratic ward in the city."

In 1905, Healy was the author of a successful move in the City Council to give outdoor parks and streets employees half a day off on Saturdays and legal holidays, the same as employees who worked in the City Hall. He also authored an ordinance, adopted unanimously, that made it unlawful to grant a saloon license anywhere within 600 feet of a public school building.

In 1907 he introduced an ordinance that would have made it a misdemeanor for a landlord to refuse to rent to a family with children. He said:

We've even got laws that will send a landlord to jail for declining to rent rooms to colored people, but that same man can send a woman and two babies out into the street and the law will not touch him. . . . It's a crime against the State, and the man that does it ought to be behind bars. He ain't fit to be at large. . . . I have been hunted about this town myself like a wounded buffalo by those landlords because I had children to bring up. . . . We've got enough ordinances on our books to run a half a dozen States, but there isn't one of them for the man of the common people with a modest salary who is trying to raise a family that will be a credit to the community. . . . I am going to ask the Council to pass an ordinance that will send the next man who refuses to take a woman in because she has babies to the chain gang.

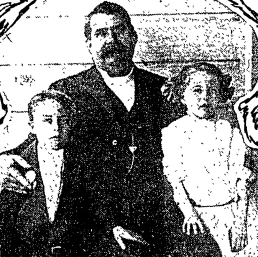
Healy and his twins in 1907.

Healy's first attempt was derailed by the city attorney, who advised that it would probably be unconstitutional. The councilman then amended his proposal to instead simply set a higher license fee on landlords who bar children, an exclusionary practice, he said, that placed "a premium on race suicide, and I'm going to fight it." The council approved the ordinance, but the city attorney again ruled the idea to be unconstitutional.

On December 7, 1909, Los Angeles changed its voting for City Council members from individual wards to all-city voting, with the top nine candidates being elected. Healy took the eleventh spot and so left the council on December 10, 1909. Afterward, in an article examining what the outgoing City Council members would do since "they lost their salaries of $100 a month and perquisites," the Los Angeles Herald said that "Barney Healy's income . . . seems to have been spent freely. Healy's faults did not include niggardliness, and no tale of hard luck ever failed to reach his pocketbook."

Healy ran for the council again in 1910 and was defeated. An unsuccessful effort was made to have the City Council appoint him as an officer in the street-cleaning department. In 1912 he was made a bailiff and deputy sheriff in a Superior Court at a salary of $100 a month.
