= Charles A. Allen (American politician) =

American politician

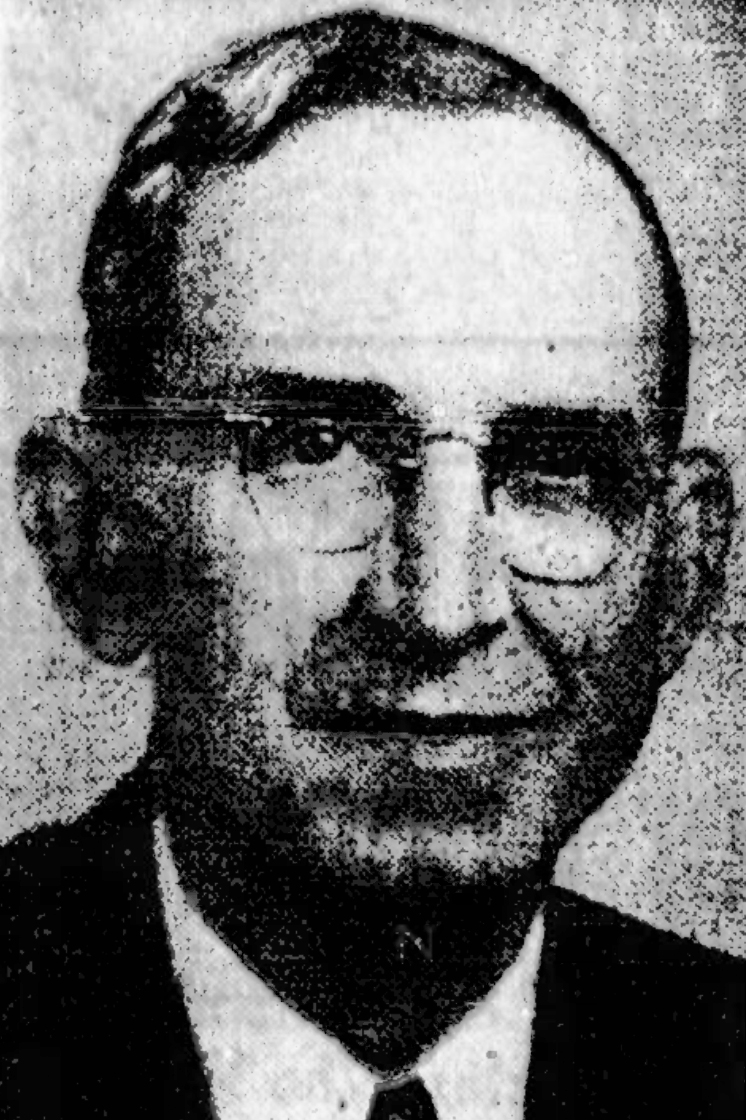
- Allen in 1943

Member of the Los Angeles City Council from the 8th District
- In office July 1, 1941 – June 30, 1947
- Preceded by: Evan Lewis
- Succeeded by: Kenneth Hahn

Personal details
- Born: October 6, 1884 Greene County, Missouri, U.S.
- Died: August 23, 1964 (aged 79) Whittier, California, U.S.
- Party: Republican

Charles A. Allen (October 6, 1884 – August 23, 1964) was an American politician. He was a member of the Los Angeles City Council from 1941 to 1947.

== Biography ==
Allen was born in Missouri in 1864. A captain in the National Guard, he was given the nickname "Cap". He was in the grocery business and ran several Los Angeles area markets. He was also active in clubs and civic associations. He became supervisor of the Los Angeles City Hall parking garage in 1935.

In 1941, while on leave from the latter position, Allen ran for Los Angeles City Council District 8 in an election to succeed 12-year veteran Councilman Evan Lewis. He won that year and was reelected twice more.

In the April 1947 primary election, his victory – already certified by the City Council – was set aside by court order, a recount was made, and he had to face a final election the next month, which he lost to Kenneth Hahn.

He died in Whittier, California on August 23, 1964, and was interred at Mountain View Mausoleum in Altadena.

== Member of the Los Angeles City Council ==
Allen was sworn in on May 14, 1941, to fill the unexpired term of Councilman Evan Lewis, who had died on May 5. Lewis's term was to end on June 30, and Allen's elected term was to begin July 1.

=== Minorities, 1945 ===
During debate on a proposal to establish an interracial committee "devoted to the interests of so-called minority groups," Allen said he was opposed because he was, "convinced that this is a Communistic setup and that the people who have been associated with this effort have been misled." The proposed ordinance was killed by an 8-6 vote.

=== Radio, 1946 ===
He voted in favor of a resolution condemning the sending of individual letters by city councilmen to support any given radio station in making an application to the Federal Communications Commission. He denounced an organization, the Hollywood Community Radio Group, Inc., which had solicited such letters because its membership, he said, "contains names of persons with reputed Communist sympathies."

Preceded by Evan Lewis	Los Angeles City Council; 8th District; 1941–47	Succeeded by Kenneth Hahn
