= Bernard C. Parks =

American politician and former police chief in Los Angeles (born 1943)

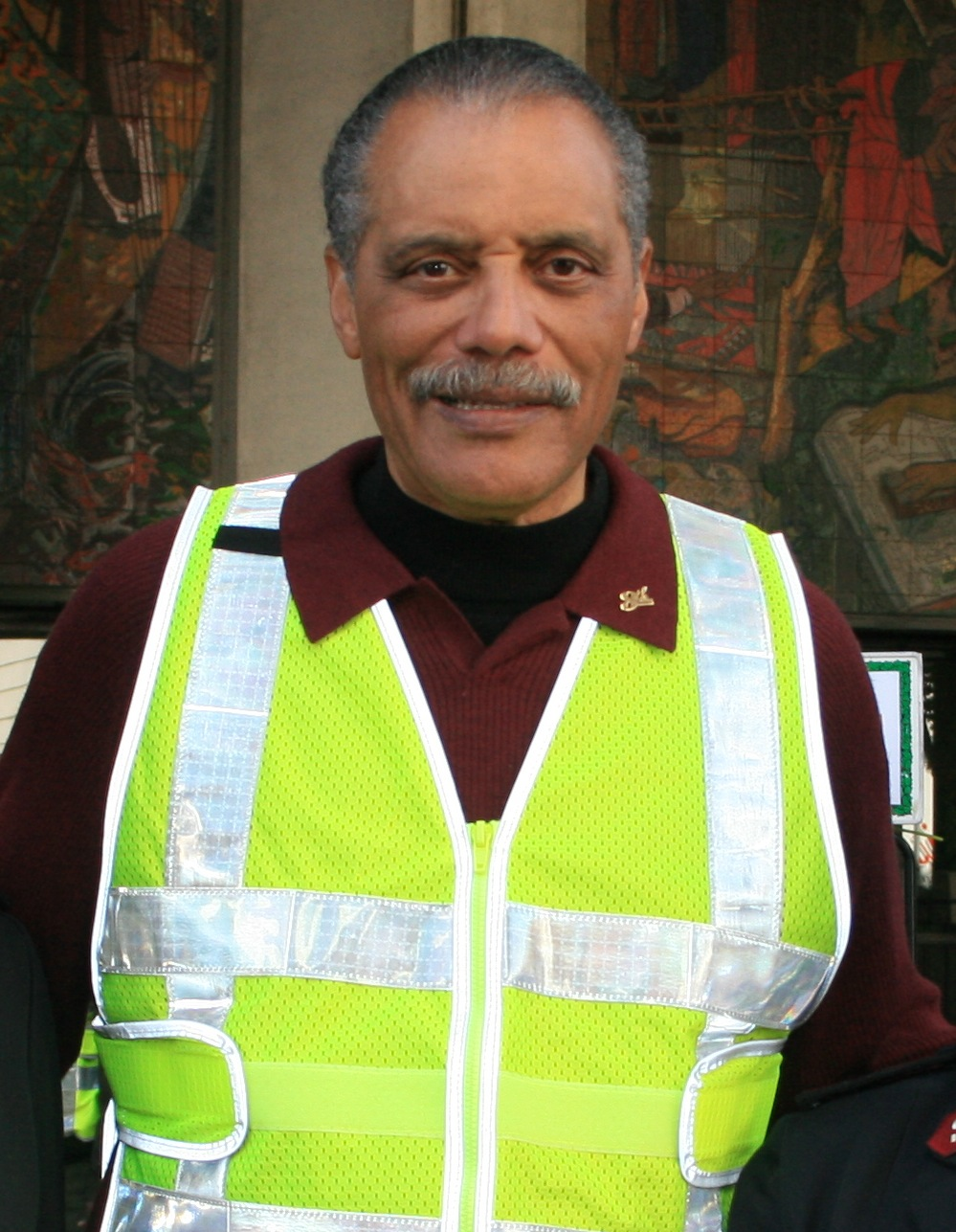
- Parks in 2010

Chief of the Los Angeles Police Department
- In office August 12, 1997 – May 4, 2002
- Preceded by: Willie L. Williams
- Succeeded by: William Bratton

Member of the Los Angeles City Council from the 8th district
- In office July 1, 2003 – July 1, 2015
- Preceded by: Mark Ridley-Thomas
- Succeeded by: Marqueece Harris-Dawson

Personal details
- Born: December 7, 1943 (age 82) Beaumont, Texas, U.S.
- Party: Democratic
- Spouse: Bobbie Parks
- Education: Pepperdine University; University of Southern California
- Occupation: Police officer (LAPD)
- Police career
- Country: United States
- Department: Los Angeles Police Department
- Service years: 1964–2002
- Rank: Sworn in as an Officer – 1964; Sergeant – 1969; Lieutenant – 1973; Captain – 1977; Commander – 1980; Deputy Chief – 1988; Asst. Chief – 1992; Deputy Chief – 1994; Chief of Police – 1997

Bernard C. Parks (born December 7, 1943) is an American politician who served as a member of the Los Angeles City Council, representing the 8th district in South Los Angeles from 2003 to 2015. A member of the Democratic Party, Parks served as Chief of the Los Angeles Police Department from August 1997 to May 2002.

== Early life and education ==
Parks is a graduate of Daniel Murphy High School and attended Los Angeles City College and received a bachelor's degree from Pepperdine University. He earned a Master's Degree in public administration from the University of Southern California.

== Career ==
During his tenure, the LAPD was rocked by a corruption and police brutality scandal involving the elite C.R.A.S.H. anti-gang unit of the Rampart Division in the overwhelmingly Latino Pico-Union and Westlake districts. The Police Commission, under Commission President Rick J. Caruso did not recommend Parks for reappointment as police chief. Parks was succeeded as chief by William Bratton.

In 2003, Parks won the seat on the Los Angeles City Council for Council District 8 representing South Los Angeles. He also unsuccessfully ran for the post of mayor in the 2005 elections, coming fourth in the primary. In 2008, Parks unsuccessfully sought to succeed Yvonne Brathwaite Burke on the Los Angeles County Board of Supervisors, losing to Mark Ridley-Thomas in a runoff election. Term limits forced Parks out of the city council office in 2015. Marqueece Harris-Dawson won the District 8 election for the vacant seat, and replaced Parks on 1 July 2015.

Police appointments
Preceded by Bayan Lewis	Chief of the Los Angeles Police Department; 1997 – 2002	Succeeded by Martin H. Pomeroy
Political offices
Preceded by Mark Ridley-Thomas	Los Angeles City Councilmember, 8th district July 1, 2003 – July 1, 2015	Succeeded by Marqueece Harris-Dawson
