= Herman Silver =

American politician

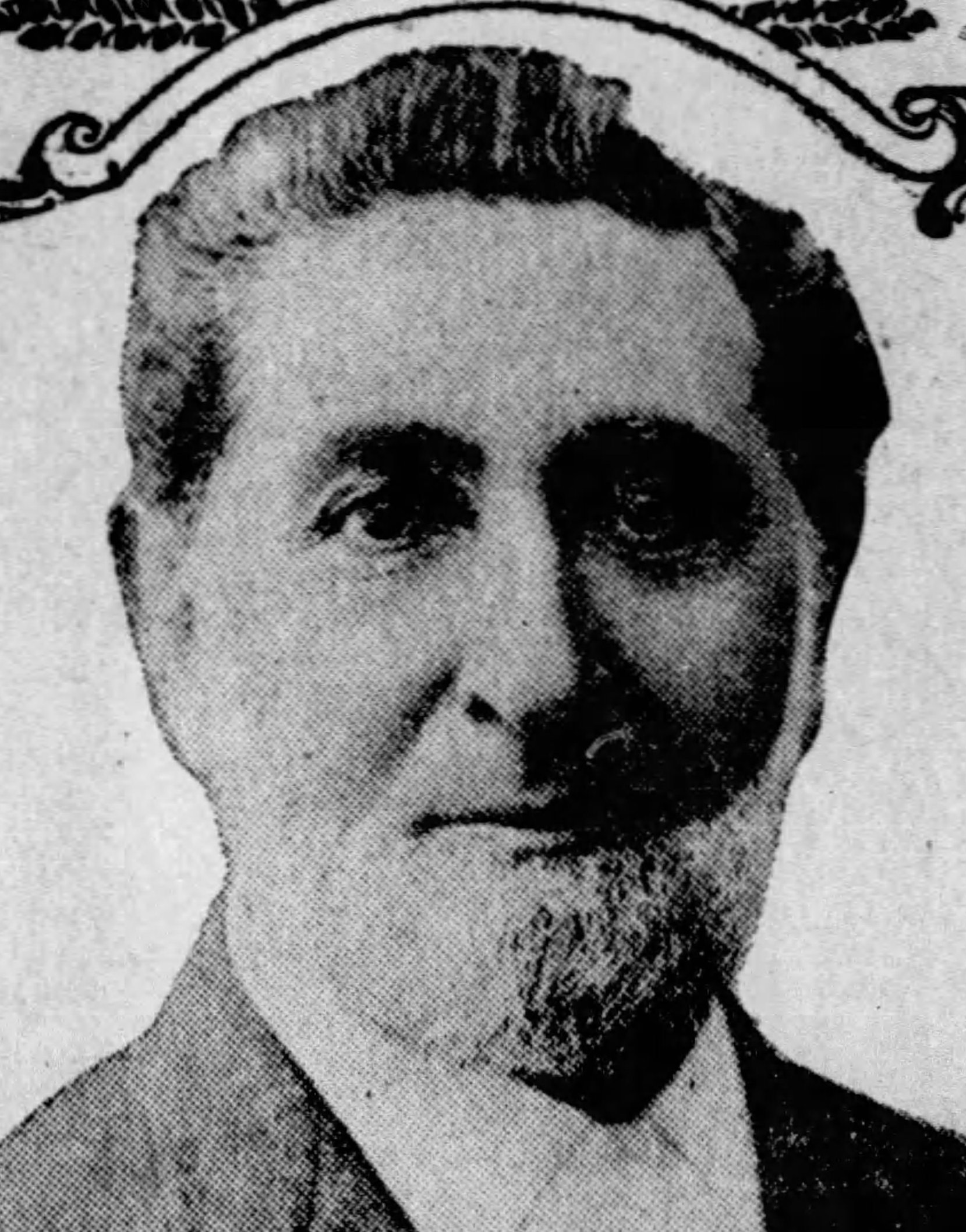
- Silver in 1913

President of the Los Angeles City Council
- In office December 16, 1896 – December 12, 1900
- Preceded by: Freeman G. Teed
- Succeeded by: Pomeroy Wills Powers

Member of the Los Angeles City Council from the 4th ward
- In office December 16, 1896 – December 12, 1900
- Preceded by: Samuel H. Kingery
- Succeeded by: Pomeroy Wills Powers

Personal details
- Born: 1831 Magdeburg, Prussian Saxony
- Died: August 19, 1913 (aged 81–82) Los Angeles, California, US
- Party: Republican

Herman Silver (1831–1913) was the chairman of the Republican County Committee in LaSalle, Illinois, superintendent of the United States Mint in Colorado, a collector of internal revenue, a railroad official and a member of the Los Angeles City Council. According to the Jewish Museum of the American West, he was fluent in Hebrew and English.

== Saxony, Illinois and Dakota ==
Silver was born in Magdeburg in Prussian Saxony in 1831, where "he was well-educated with Hebrew training." He emigrated to the United States in 1848, and on the ship he exchanged Hebrew-English language lessons with a Catholic priest.

He settled in Kankakee County, Illinois, where he was a Free Soiler under John C. Fremont. He helped organize the Republican Party and became chairman of the Republican county committee in LaSalle County. He married Eliza Post in Peru, Illinois and "went to Springfield and met Lincoln and was trusted with political work in Northern Illinois.

He did not serve in the Civil War because of "congestion of the lungs," but he helped raise funds to support Illinois soldiers, and he helped runaway slaves.

He ran for clerk of LaSalle County in 1861 but was defeated. In 1863 Governor Richard Yates appointed him clerk of the new city of Peru, Illinois, and the same year he became Federal Assessor of the 2nd Illinois District. In 1864 he became a circuit court clerk, and in 1866 he was admitted to the bar. He left that job in 1869.

In 1864 Silver was elected as county clerk on the Republican ticket, after he had "made a vigorous canvass, not only for himself and the rest of the local ticket, but [also] for Lincoln and the Union." He was reelected at the end of his term.

In July 1872 Silver and 22 other men from Aurora, LaSalle, Ottawa and Peru were charter members of a new B'nai B'rith lodge that met at Turner Hall in Ottawa.

He was appointed by Illinois governor John Lourie Beveridge as a representative of Illinois to attend a World's Fair in Vienna, Austria, in the summer of 1873. That same year he was given a new job by the federal government as United States marshal in the Dakota Territory.

== Colorado ==
He was next identified, in 1875, as "Register of Uncle Sam's land office at Denver, Colorado," with his former hometown Illinois newspaper's editorial comment that:

The main inducement to Mr. S. to accept a government position in Colorado was the hope of the air in that region might be beneficial to his shattered health. In this he has not been disappointed. Mr. S. finds his health fully restored and the air of the mountains a true elixir of life to him.

The next year he was promoted to collector of internal revenue at the same location, and then, in 1877, he was superintendent of the U.S. Mint in Denver. He did, however, have to make a trip in 1881 to Washington, D.C., in a successful attempt to keep his job because Senator Henry M. Teller of Colorado was opposed to his reappointment, even though Senator Nathaniel P. Hill of the same state favored him. In 1883, with the election of Democrat Grover Cleveland, he lost his job at the mint. That same year it was reported that he had declined to be nominated as mayor of Denver.

He became president and general manager of the Tribune, "for years the most powerful newspaper in Colorado." While in Denver he was president of Temple Emanuel "for most years between 1878 and 1887."

A contemporary, A.L. Scofield, who had been a state legislator in Idaho, recalled of Silver in this era that:

His associates were men of prominence and power. He knew Gen. John A. Logan very intimately and also knew [Abraham] Lincoln. ... At Denver he was in control of the Tribune and made it the best paper in the state. He was receiver of the Rio Grande Railroad and made a success of it.

== California ==
In 1887, Silver's ill health impelled him to move to California, where he was named treasurer of the California Southern and California Central railroad lines.

In 1887, he and J.F. Crank were also granted a franchise to build a "double track cable road from Seventh Street and Alvarado streets to Aliso and Chicago streets." Mayor William H. Workman noted that Silver and Crank "now own the controlling interest in the Workman-Goodwin franchise for First Street. In 1889 Silver was appointed receiver of the Los Angeles and Pacific Railway, a fledgling steam railroad that ran from Sisters Hospital in Los Angeles to Santa Monica but had been crippled by rainstorms early that year and was on the verge of bankruptcy. It was said that:

Herman Silver was not legally or in any other way responsible for the indebtedness, as he had only acted as the court directed; but his sense of honor would not allow any one, directly or indirectly, to lose through him; so he mortgaged his home for $8000 and paid the claims of employes and others in full. What is more, he never received a dollar of this expenditure, nor for his services as receiver, and the entire amount was a dead loss to him.

Silver was president of the Los Angeles City Council in 1896–1900. He ran unsuccessfully for mayor in 1900, the Herald backing him because he "represents the principle that the city should govern the saloons, instead of the saloons ruling the city" and "He is an avowed advocate of the municipal ownership of the water system." He also was president of the Los Angeles Water Commission.

In 1902 he became president of the City Water Commission.

In 1903, Governor Pardee appointed Silver to a two-year term as a state bank commissioner, and the commission elected him as its president. He was reappointed to the board in 1905, and he resigned in 1908.

Silver was in the news in April 1907 when a baby boy, "dressed in rich clothing and carefully cloaked with a costly garment," was discovered on the doorstep of his home at 986 Magnolia Avenue. The parents of the infant were later identified.

== Death and legacy ==
Silver died of a heart attack in his home on August 19, 1913. A funeral service was conducted in the family residence, 981 Magnolia Avenue, under the auspices of Masonic Lodge 392, with a minister and a rabbi officiating. Burial was in Rosedale Cemetery.

He bequeathed most of his estate, valued at $200,000, to his widow, Eliza A. Silver, but also left $2,000 each to his children, Herman and Cora E. Silver. He gave $100 each to the Kaspare Cohn Hospital, the Jewish Orphans Home and the Society for the Prevention of Cruelty to Animals. His widow died in February 1914.

Silver is memorialized in the name of Silver Lake, a neighborhood in Los Angeles and its eponymous reservoir, which was named in his honor.
