= Unionville, Illinois =

Unionville, Illinois may refer to:

- Unionville, Massac County, Illinois, an unincorporated community in Massac County
- Unionville, Vermilion County, Illinois, an unincorporated community in Vermilion County
- Unionville, Whiteside County, Illinois, an unincorporated community in Whiteside County
- Streator, Illinois, formerly known as Unionville
