= 1898 California lieutenant gubernatorial election =

- November 8, 1898
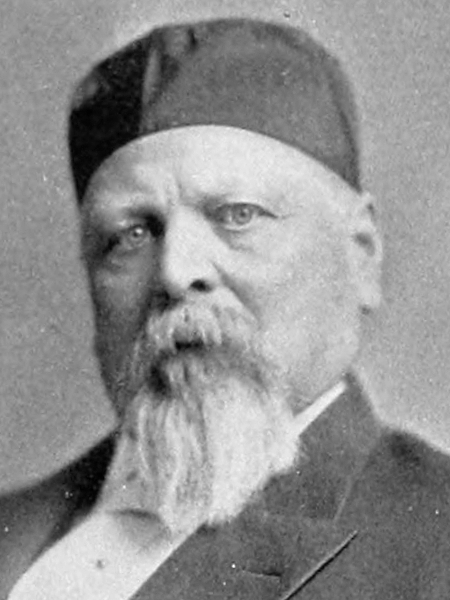

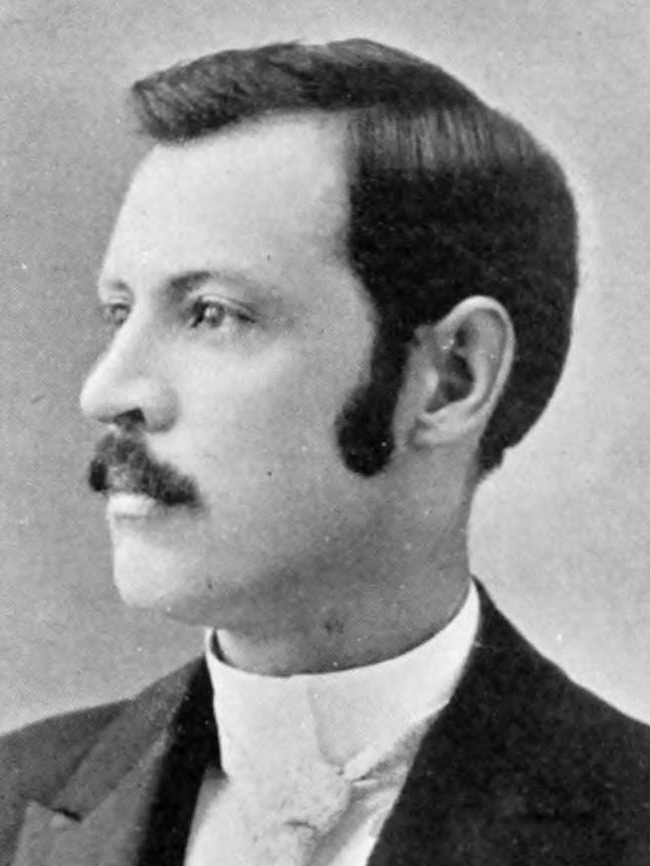
Nominee	Jacob H. Neff	Edward L. Hutchinson
Party	Republican	Democratic
Alliance		Populist; Silver Republican
Popular vote	146,323	118,921
Percentage	52.20%	42.42%
Lieutenant Governor before election
William T. Jeter
Democratic
Elected Lieutenant Governor
Jacob H. Neff
Republican

The 1898 California lieutenant gubernatorial election was held on November 8, 1898. Republican State Senator Jacob H. Neff defeated Democratic-Populist-Silver Republican Fusion Los Angeles City Councilman Edward L. Hutchinson with 50.83% of the vote.

== General election ==
=== Candidates ===
- Alden Anderson, Republican
- Edward L. Hutchinson, Democratic
- Andrew James, Socialist Labor
- Robert Summers, Prohibition

=== Results ===
1906 California lieutenant gubernatorial election
Party	Candidate	Votes	%	±%
Republican	Jacob H. Neff	146,323	52.20%	
Democratic	Edward L. Hutchinson	118,921	42.42%	
Socialist Labor	Andrew James	8,784	3.13%	
Prohibition	Robert Summers	6,307	2.25%	
Majority		280,335		
Turnout				
Republican gain from Democratic		Swing		
