= Unionville, New York =

The following places in New York are called Unionville:

- Unionville, Albany County, New York
- Unionville, Orange County, New York
- Unionville, a hamlet in Potsdam (town), New York
- Hawthorne, New York, in Westchester County, formerly known as Unionville.
