= Pomeroy Wills Powers =

American politician

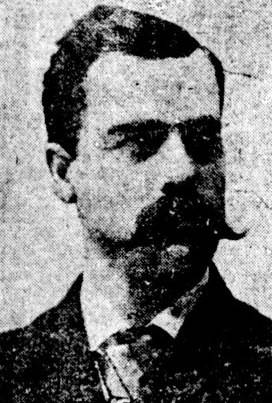

President of the Los Angeles City Council
- In office December 12, 1900 – December 5, 1902
- Preceded by: Herman Silver
- Succeeded by: William Miller Bowen

Member of the Los Angeles City Council from the 4th ward
- In office December 12, 1900 – December 5, 1902
- Preceded by: Herman Silver
- Succeeded by: Theodore Summerland

Personal details
- Born: February 19, 1852 Rushville, New York
- Died: December 3, 1916 (aged 64) Los Angeles, California
- Party: Republican

Pomeroy Wells Powers (February 19, 1852 – December 3, 1916) was an attorney and property developer in Kansas City, Kansas, and Los Angeles, where he was president of the Los Angeles City Council from 1900 to 1902.

== Personal ==
Powers was born on February 19, 1852, in Rushville, New York, the son of Benjamin Powers and Dian Hudson, both of New York, and was educated in the public schools in Rushville. From 1871 to 1877 he studied at Manhattan College in Manhattan, Kansas, where he received a doctor of jurisprudence degree. He was married to Ida May Bowen, and their children were John R., Benjamin Nelson, Hale P. Clifford Hudson, Earl Delavin, Grace Bowen Hannas and Gloria May Beattie. He moved to California in 1892.

Powers died on December 3, 1916.

== Vocation ==
Powers was referred to as a "Kansas City capitalist" when he visited San Francisco in 1887 and stayed at the Palace Hotel.

In Los Angeles, Powers was a lawyer who was one of the original developers of a tract called Alvarado Terrace. He was also an officer of the Juanity Mining Company and the Short Line Beach Company. In 1905 he was an investor in and a director of a company that founded Inglewood Park Cemetery in what is today Inglewood, California.

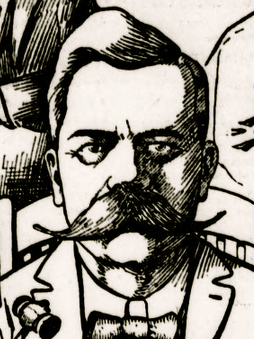
Drawing of Powers in 1901.

Powers was president of the Los Angeles City Council in 1900–1902, having been elected as a Republican to represent the 4th Ward. He was an unsuccessful Republican candidate for mayor in 1902. A Presbyterian, he was a member of the Union League. In 1910, Powers was a member of the Olympic Club in San Francisco, which was planning a hike from the Golden Gate Park Panhandle to Ocean Beach.

== Legacy ==
A small strip of Alvarado Terrace, paved in red brick, was named as Powers Place in 1911. It has been called the "shortest street in Los Angeles." "Together, Powers Place and Terrace Park are recognized as Cultural Heritage Board Monument Number 210."
