= Unionville, Washington County, Ohio =

Unincorporated community in Ohio, U.S.

Coordinates: 39°27′08″N 81°27′28″W

Unionville is an unincorporated community in Washington County, in the U.S. state of Ohio.

== History ==
Unionville was established in the 1830s under the name Pinchtown.
