= National Register of Historic Places listings in Nemaha County, Kansas =

Location of Nemaha County in Kansas

This is a list of the National Register of Historic Places listings in Nemaha County, Kansas.

This is intended to be a complete list of the properties and districts on the National Register of Historic Places in Nemaha County, Kansas, United States. The locations of National Register properties and districts for which the latitude and longitude coordinates are included below, may be seen in a map.

There are 12 properties and districts listed on the National Register in the county.

This National Park Service list is complete through NPS recent listings posted June 26, 2026.

== Current listings ==
	Name on the Register	Image	Date listed	Location	City or town	Description
1	Clear Creek Camel Truss Bridge	Clear Creek Camel Truss Bridge	May 9, 2003 (#03000360)	Unnamed road, 0.5 miles west of FAS 485 and 6.8 miles north of Baileyville; 39°56′22″N 96°11′33″W	Baileyville	
2	Hand-Dug City Water Well	Hand-Dug City Water Well	March 15, 2007 (#07000141)	301 N. 11th St. 39°50′16″N 96°04′14″W	Seneca	
3	Lake Nemaha Dam Guardrail	Lake Nemaha Dam Guardrail	July 2, 2008 (#08000620)	5.12 miles south of Seneca on K-63; 39°45′56″N 96°02′06″W	Seneca	
4	Marion Hall	Marion Hall	April 25, 2001 (#01000411)	Junction of Main and 1st Sts. 39°50′34″N 96°10′27″W	Baileyville	
5	Nemaha County Jail and Sheriff's House	Nemaha County Jail and Sheriff's House	May 19, 2004 (#04000455)	113 N. 6th St. 39°50′10″N 96°03′50″W	Seneca	
6	Old Albany Schoolhouse	Old Albany Schoolhouse	April 13, 1972 (#72000518)	2 miles north of Sabetha; 39°56′32″N 95°48′16″W	Berwick Township	
7	Prairie Grove School	Prairie Grove School	March 8, 2006 (#06000113)	Township Road H southeast of its intersection with Township Road 232; 39°59′04″N 96°06′32″W	Seneca	
8	St. Mary's Church	St. Mary's Church	December 5, 1980 (#80001470)	9208 Main Street; 39°53′08″N 96°05′53″W	St. Benedict	
9	Seneca Main Street Historic District	Seneca Main Street Historic District	September 7, 2006 (#06000770)	301-607 Main, 304-612 Main, 25 N. 6th, and 26 N. 4th 39°50′03″N 96°03′46″W	Seneca	415, 417 and 419 Main Street were destroyed in a fire in 2017 or earlier.
10	US Post Office-Sabetha	US Post Office-Sabetha	October 17, 1989 (#89001650)	122 S. 9th St. 39°54′10″N 95°48′04″W	Sabetha	
11	US Post Office-Seneca	US Post Office-Seneca	October 17, 1989 (#89001651)	607 Main St. 39°50′04″N 96°03′53″W	Seneca	
12	John Waggoner House	John Waggoner House	April 4, 2025 (#100011682)	2441 204th Road; 39°56′13″N 95°47′56″W	Sabetha	

== See also ==
- List of National Historic Landmarks in Kansas
- National Register of Historic Places listings in Kansas
