= Rock Creek Township, Kansas =

Rock Creek Township, Kansas may refer to one of the following places:

- Rock Creek Township, Butler County, Kansas
- Rock Creek Township, Coffey County, Kansas
- Rock Creek Township, Cowley County, Kansas
- Rock Creek Township, Jefferson County, Kansas
- Rock Creek Township, Nemaha County, Kansas
- Rock Creek Township, Pottawatomie County, Kansas
- Rock Creek Township, Wabaunsee County, Kansas

== See also ==
- Rock Creek Township (disambiguation)
