= K-187 (Kansas highway) =

State highway in Kansas, U.S.

K-187
- K-187 highlighted in red

Route information
- Maintained by KDOT
- Length: 7.999 mi (12.873 km)
- Existed: March 9, 1955–present

Major junctions
- South end: K-9 in Centralia
- North end: US-36 west of Seneca

Location
- Country: United States
- State: Kansas
- Counties: Nemaha

Highway system
- Kansas State Highway System; Interstate; US; State; Spurs
← K-186	→ K-188

K-187 is an approximately 8-mile-long (13 km) north–south state highway in the U.S. state of Kansas. Located entirely within Nemaha County, K-187 runs from K-9 in Centralia north to U.S. Route 36 (US-36) west of Seneca. The highway passes through grasslands characteristic of the Great Plains and is a two-lane road for its entire length.

Before state highways were numbered in Kansas there were auto trails. K-187's southern terminus closely follows the former Kansas White Way and the northern terminus closely follows the former Pikes Peak Ocean to Ocean Highway. K-187 was established by the Kansas State Highway Commission, now known as the Kansas Department of Transportation, as a state highway on March 9, 1955, and its alignment has not changed since.

== Route description ==
K-187's southern terminus is at K-9, also known as John Riggins Avenue, in Centralia. The highway travels north along 2nd Street and soon exits the city as it becomes surrounded by rural farmlands. The roadway reaches a crossing over Weyer Creek, a tributary of North Fork Black Vermillion River, before intersecting Stringtown Road. The highway continues through rural farmlands to an at-grade crossing with a Union Pacific Railroad track. From here K-187 continues north a short distance to its northern terminus at US-36 west of Seneca.

The Kansas Department of Transportation (KDOT) tracks the traffic levels on its highways, and in 2019, they determined that on average the traffic ranged from 915 vehicles per day north of Centralia to just over 1,000 vehicles per day in Centralia. The entire length is a paved two-lane highway. K-187 is not included in the National Highway System, (Note: The National Highway System is a system of highways important to the nation's defense, economy, and mobility.) but does connect to it at its northern terminus.

== History ==
Prior to the formation of the Kansas state highway system, there were auto trails, which were an informal network of marked routes that existed in the United States and Canada in the early part of the 20th century. K-187's southern terminus closely follows the former Kansas White Way, which travelled from Colorado Springs, Colorado, east to St. Joseph, Missouri. The northern terminus closely follows the former Pikes Peak Ocean to Ocean Highway, which was formed early in 1912, and travelled from New York City to Los Angeles.

K-187 was assigned by the State Highway Commission of Kansas, now known as KDOT, on March 9, 1955. That same day, a separate resolution was passed to realign K-187's southern terminus (K-9) to travel east from Centralia instead of south out of the city. On August 1, 1955, a $18,295 (equivalent to $219,881 in 2025) bid was approved to pave the entire length of the highway. In late May 1957, a $9,909 (equivalent to $113,590 in 2025) bid was approved to repave the entire length of K-187. From July 26 to 27, 1981, thunderstorms produced as much as 8 inches (20 cm) of rain over Kansas. The flood waters washed a bridge out on K-187. The bridge was replaced and re-opened to traffic that same year. On January 1, 2022, KDOT announced that two separate bids were approved for work on K-187. One was a $942,370 bid to replace the bridge over Weyer Creek, and the other was a $1,460,270 bid to replace the bridge over the Fisher Creek Drainage. The highway's alignment has not changed since it was established.

== Major intersections ==
The entire route is in Nemaha County.

Location	mi	km	Destinations	Notes
Centralia	0.000	0.000	K-9 (John Riggins Avenue) – Corning, Frankfort	Southern terminus
Richmond–Marion township line	7.999	12.873	US-36 – Marysville, Seneca	Northern terminus
1.000 mi = 1.609 km; 1.000 km = 0.621 mi
