= Capioma Township, Kansas =

Township in Nemaha County, Kansas, U.S.

Capioma Township
- Township
- Location within Nemaha County
- Coordinates: 39.794059°N 95.836244°W
- Country: United States
- State: Kansas
- County: Nemaha

Area
  - Total: 36.083 sq mi (93.45 km^{2})
  - Land: 35.955 sq mi (93.12 km^{2})
  - Water: 0.128 sq mi (0.33 km^{2}) 0.35%

Population (2020)
  - Total: 154
  - Density: 4.28/sq mi (1.65/km^{2})
- Time zone: UTC-6 (CST)
  - Summer (DST): UTC-5 (CDT)
- Area code: 785

Capioma Township is a township in Nemaha County, Kansas, United States. As of the 2020 census, its population was 154.

== Geography ==
Capioma Township covers an area of 36.083 square miles (93.45 square kilometers).

=== Communities ===
- Capioma
- Woodlawn

=== Adjacent townships ===
- Rock Creek Township, Nemaha County (north)
- Walnut Township, Brown County (northeast)
- Powhattan Township, Brown County (east)
- Granada Township, Nemaha County (south)
- Harrison Township, Nemaha County (southwest)
- Adams Township, Nemaha County (west)
- Gilman Township, Nemaha County (northwest)
