= Illinois Township, Nemaha County, Kansas =

Township in Nemaha County, Kansas, U.S.

Illinois Township
- Township
- Location within Nemaha County
- Coordinates: 39.692169°N 96.066778°W
- Country: United States
- State: Kansas
- County: Nemaha

Area
  - Total: 35.836 sq mi (92.81 km^{2})
  - Land: 35.785 sq mi (92.68 km^{2})
  - Water: 0.051 sq mi (0.13 km^{2}) 0.14%

Population (2020)
  - Total: 532
  - Density: 14.9/sq mi (5.74/km^{2})
- Time zone: UTC-6 (CST)
  - Summer (DST): UTC-5 (CDT)
- Area code: 785

Illinois Township is a township in Nemaha County, Kansas, United States. As of the 2020 census, its population was 532.

== Geography ==
Illinois Township covers an area of 35.836 square miles (92.81 square kilometers).

=== Communities ===
- Corning
- part of Centralia

=== Adjacent townships ===
- Mitchell Township, Nemaha County (north)
- Adams Township, Nemaha County (northeast)
- Harrison Township, Nemaha County (east)
- Reilly Township, Nemaha County (southeast)
- Red Vermillion Township, Nemaha County (south)
- Neuchatel Township, Nemaha County (southwest)
- Home Township, Nemaha County (west)
- Center Township, Nemaha County (northwest)

=== Major highways ===
- K-9
- K-63
