= Rock Creek Township =

Rock Creek Township may refer to:

== Arkansas ==
- Rock Creek Township, Searcy County, Arkansas

== Illinois ==
- Rock Creek Township, Hancock County, Illinois

== Indiana ==
- Rock Creek Township, Bartholomew County, Indiana
- Rock Creek Township, Carroll County, Indiana
- Rock Creek Township, Huntington County, Indiana
- Rockcreek Township, Wells County, Indiana

== Iowa ==
- Rock Creek Township, Jasper County, Iowa

== Kansas ==
- Rock Creek Township, Butler County, Kansas
- Rock Creek Township, Coffey County, Kansas
- Rock Creek Township, Cowley County, Kansas
- Rock Creek Township, Jefferson County, Kansas
- Rock Creek Township, Nemaha County, Kansas, in Nemaha County, Kansas
- Rock Creek Township, Pottawatomie County, Kansas, in Pottawatomie County, Kansas
- Rock Creek Township, Wabaunsee County, Kansas, in Wabaunsee County, Kansas

== Nebraska ==
- Rock Creek Township, Saunders County, Nebraska

== North Carolina ==
- Rock Creek Township, Guilford County, North Carolina, in Guilford County, North Carolina
- Rock Creek Township, Wilkes County, North Carolina, in Wilkes County, North Carolina

== South Dakota ==
- Rock Creek Township, Miner County, South Dakota, in Miner County, South Dakota
