= K-62 (Kansas highway) =

State highway in Kansas, U.S.

K-62
- K-62 highlighted in red

Route information
- Maintained by KDOT
- Length: 13.339 mi (21.467 km)
- Existed: 1927–present

Major junctions
- South end: K-16 west of Holton
- North end: K-9 southwest of Goff

Location
- Country: United States
- State: Kansas
- Counties: Jackson, Nemaha

Highway system
- Kansas State Highway System; Interstate; US; State; Spurs
← K-61	→ K-63

K-62 is an approximately 13.3-mile-long (21.4 km) state highway in the U.S. state of Kansas. It is a north-south highway that serves towns in the northeastern part of the state. It parallels Soldier Creek for its entire length. K-62's southern terminus is at K-16 west of Holton and the northern terminus is at K-9 southwest of Goff.

== Route description ==
K-62's southern terminus is at K-16 west of Holton in rural Jackson County. It proceeds north through semi-forest ed rolling hills. After about 2.5 miles (4.0 km) the highway crosses Soldier Creek. K-62 passes through an s-curve before intersecting 254th Road, which travels east to Circleville. The highway then intersects 262nd Road before crossing over Soldier Creek again. K-62 then enters Soldier as First Street. K-62 continues a short distance to Jackson Street, where it turns west. After one block, the highway turns back north onto Second Street. Just past an intersection with Friend Street, K-62 leaves the city and passes Soldier Cemetery. The remaining roughly 1.5 miles (2.4 km) of highway before entering Nemaha County, wind through tree laden hills, where it crosses Soldier Creek for the final time. Upon entering Nemaha County, it resumes a due north course, and the terrain flattens considerably. K-62 continues through scenic rolling hills and fields before arriving at its northern terminus at K-9 southwest of Goff.

The Kansas Department of Transportation (KDOT) tracks the traffic levels on its highways, and in 2019, they determined that on average the traffic varied from 225 vehicles per day slightly north of Soldier to 380 vehicles per day near the southern terminus. K-62 is not included in the National Highway System. The National Highway System is a system of highways important to the nation's defense, economy, and mobility.

== History ==
K-62 first appeared on the map in 1927. Between 1931 and 1932, K-62 was realigned to intersect K-63 where it currently turns north into Nemaha County. Between 1933 and 1934, the highway was realigned to intersect K-63 slightly north of Havensville. Between 1934 and 1936, K-62 was truncated to end at the Pottawatomie–Jackson County line, east of Havensville. Between July 1938 and 1939, K-62 was extended west from the county line to K-63 slightly north of Havensville. Between 1944 and 1945, K-62 was truncated back to the Pottawatomie–Jackson County line. Between 1953 and 1956, the highway was realigned to continue north from Soldier.

== Major junctions ==
County	Location	mi	km	Destinations	Notes
Jackson	Grant Township	0.000	0.000	K-16 (230 Road) to K-63 – Holton	Southern terminus; road continues as E Road
Nemaha	Harrison–Reilly township line	13.339	21.467	K-9 to K-63 / US-75	Northern terminus; road continues as P Road
1.000 mi = 1.609 km; 1.000 km = 0.621 mi
