= Nemaha Central USD 115 =

Public school district in Seneca, Kansas

Address
- 318 Main St. Seneca, Kansas, 66538; United States
- Coordinates: 39°52′2″N 96°3′38″W

District information
- Type: Public
- Grades: K to 12
- Schools: 2

Other information
- Website: usd115.org

Nemaha Central USD 115 is a public unified school district headquartered in Seneca, Kansas, United States. The district includes the communities of Baileyville, Kelly, Oneida, Seneca, St. Benedict and nearby rural areas of Nemaha County.

== Schools ==
The school district operates the following schools:

- Nemaha Central High School
- Nemaha Central Elementary and Middle School

== History ==
In 1859, the first organized classes in Seneca were taught in the parlor of the Smith hotel. As the class sizes increased, they were moved to the Nemaha County Courthouse. In 1865, the community build a brick schoolhouse at the site of the current Saints Peter and Paul Catholic Church now in Seneca. The school employed two teachers, and it marked the beginning of a graded school system in the village.

In 1868, the school became known as District No. 11. To accommodate a growing population, the district built a four-room stone schoolhouse, adding two additional rooms a few years later. This building served the town for 13 years before the district demolished it in 1889.

In 1881, the district used money from a bequest to construct the Van Loan Memorial School Building. It was designated for children in the lower grades who lived south of the railroad tracks in Seneca. There were five graduates of this school in its first year. Classes were held there until 1890. In 2003, the Van Loan Building was demolished by a fire.

In 1889, the district started building the Seneca Public High School; it opened on April 28, 1890. The high school was made of pressed brick, and it was heated by steam. It was large enough to accommodate all the pupils in the Nemaha Valley District as well as pupils from other parts of the county.

In 1937, crowded conditions at the high school prompted plans for a new Seneca Grade School. The new grade school was finished in 1938, and it contained eight classrooms, an office, a stage, an auditorium / gymnasium, and a vocational shop and classroom. The building was planned so the district could add wings to accommodate future expansion. In February 1939, a cornerstone containing a copper box time capsule was placed on the southeast corner of the building. The grade school opened for grades 1–6 in August 1939.

In 1965, the State of Kansas started unifying small county school districts into larger school districts. The Seneca School District was combined with towns of Kelly, Kansas, and Corning, Kansas, into Unified School District No. 442. In 1966, the new school board selected the name Nemaha Valley for the new school district. According to Earl McGee, the superintendent of school, “My suggestion would be ‘Nemaha Valley Schools’ since the valley starts at Corning and runs past Kelly and Seneca.”

On December 14, 1966, the Seneca Public High School was condemned. From 1967 to 1969, high school classes were held at the City Hall building, the Masonic Temple, and at the Seneca Grade School. Several bond issues to build a new school failed to pass election. Much of the disagreement centered around the location of the new high school. Some supported a central location for the three towns, while others favored building it in Seneca. In 1968, this disagreement eventually led to Corning transferring to the Centralia, Kansas school district. After Corning left the Nemaha Valley District, the high school bond issue specifying a new Nemaha Valley High School at Seneca passed. The old Seneca Public High School was demolished on July 1, 1968.

In 1969 the new Nemaha Valley High School opened for classes. During this same year, Kelly High School was closed, and its students attended NVHS. In March 1970, Nemaha Valley High School was dedicated.

In 1974, Saints Peter and Paul High School closed. In 1979, Kelly Junior High closed, and in 1981, Kelly grade school closed. During this time, a new Onida grade school and high school and Bern High school opened in the district.

This addition of students required expansion of the buildings. In 1983, the north wing on the grade school was added, and in 1993, the west wing of the grade school was added. The north wing is now the junior high. The west wing primarily houses elementary grade classes.

On March 10, 2007, the old section of Seneca Grade School was destroyed in a fire. For the remainder of the school year, classes were held in the public library annex in the basement of Bowman Law Office and Dental Practice, at the former restaurant Bob's Sirloin, and at the high school. A bond issue to build a new grade school and junior high school passed in November 2007. The new school was to be located south of the high school.

Nemaha Central USD 115 formed in 2011 by the consolidation of Nemaha Valley USD 442 and B&B USD 451.

In May 2014, state budget cuts resulted in closing of the neighboring B and B High School in Baileyville, Kansas. Those students were transferred to Nemaha Valley High School. This prompted a school renaming the preceding year, with students in grades 7 through 11 at Baileyville, students in grades K through 11 in Nemaha Valley, and students in Saints Peter and Paul Catholic School voting to change the name to Nemaha Central. The mascot was renamed the Thunder, and the new school colors were purple and Columbia blue. In August 2014, the school opened its doors as Nemaha Central. This also prompted changing the district number from 442 to 115.

== See also ==
- Kansas State Department of Education
- Kansas State High School Activities Association
- List of high schools in Kansas
- List of unified school districts in Kansas
