= Mitchell Township, Nemaha County, Kansas =

Township in Nemaha County, Kansas, U.S.

Mitchell Township
- Township
- Location within Nemaha County
- Coordinates: 39.776517°N 96.060983°W
- Country: United States
- State: Kansas
- County: Nemaha

Area
  - Total: 35.705 sq mi (92.48 km^{2})
  - Land: 35.7 sq mi (92 km^{2})
  - Water: 0.005 sq mi (0.013 km^{2}) 0.01%

Population (2020)
  - Total: 308
  - Density: 8.63/sq mi (3.33/km^{2})
- Time zone: UTC-6 (CST)
  - Summer (DST): UTC-5 (CDT)
- Area code: 785

Mitchell Township is a township in Nemaha County, Kansas, United States. As of the 2020 census, its population was 308.

== Geography ==
Mitchell Township covers an area of 35.705 square miles (92.48 square kilometers).

=== Adjacent townships ===
- Richmond Township, Nemaha County (north)
- Gilman Township, Nemaha County (northeast)
- Adams Township, Nemaha County (east)
- Harrison Township, Nemaha County (southeast)
- Illinois Township, Nemaha County (south)
- Home Township, Nemaha County (southwest)
- Center Township, Nemaha County (west)
- Marion Township, Nemaha County (northwest)

=== Major highways ===
- K-63
- K-187
