= Washington Township, Nemaha County, Kansas =

Township in Nemaha County, Kansas, U.S.

Washington Township
- Township
- Location within Nemaha County
- Coordinates: 39.949878°N 95.949052°W
- Country: United States
- State: Kansas
- County: Nemaha

Area
  - Total: 35.917 sq mi (93.02 km^{2})
  - Land: 35.914 sq mi (93.02 km^{2})
  - Water: 0.003 sq mi (0.0078 km^{2}) 0.01%

Population (2020)
  - Total: 380
  - Density: 11/sq mi (4.1/km^{2})
- Time zone: UTC-6 (CST)
  - Summer (DST): UTC-5 (CDT)
- Area code: 785

Washington Township is a township in Nemaha County, Kansas, United States. As of the 2020 census, its population was 380.

== Geography ==
Washington Township covers an area of 35.917 square miles (93.02 square kilometers).

=== Communities ===
- Bern

=== Adjacent townships ===
- Berwick Township, Nemaha County (east)
- Rock Creek Township, Nemaha County (southeast)
- Gilman Township, Nemaha County (south)
- Richmond Township, Nemaha County (southwest)
- Nemaha Township, Nemaha County (west)
