= Center Township, Nemaha County, Kansas =

Township in Nemaha County, Kansas, U.S.

Center Township
- Township
- Location within Nemaha County
- Coordinates: 39.783671°N 96.18344°W
- Country: United States
- State: Kansas
- County: Nemaha

Area
  - Total: 36.211 sq mi (93.79 km^{2})
  - Land: 36.077 sq mi (93.44 km^{2})
  - Water: 0.134 sq mi (0.35 km^{2}) 0.37%

Population (2020)
  - Total: 178
  - Density: 4.93/sq mi (1.90/km^{2})
- Time zone: UTC-6 (CST)
  - Summer (DST): UTC-5 (CDT)
- Area code: 785

Center Township is a township in Nemaha County, Kansas, United States. As of the 2020 census, its population was 178.

== Geography ==
Center Township covers an area of 36.211 square miles (93.79 square kilometers).

=== Adjacent townships ===
- Marion Township, Nemaha County (north)
- Richmond Township, Nemaha County (northeast)
- Mitchell Township, Nemaha County (east)
- Illinois Township, Nemaha County (southeast)
- Home Township, Nemaha County (south)
- Noble Township, Marshall County (southwest)
- Lincoln Township, Marshall County (west)
- Murray Township, Marshall County (northwest)

=== Major highways ===
- K-187
