= Gilman Township, Kansas =

Township in Nemaha County, Kansas, U.S.

Gilman Township
- Township
- Location within Nemaha County
- Coordinates: 39.866713°N 95.95426°W
- Country: United States
- State: Kansas
- County: Nemaha

Area
  - Total: 35.873 sq mi (92.91 km^{2})
  - Land: 35.804 sq mi (92.73 km^{2})
  - Water: 0.069 sq mi (0.18 km^{2}) 0.19%

Population (2020)
  - Total: 191
  - Density: 5.33/sq mi (2.06/km^{2})
- Time zone: UTC-6 (CST)
  - Summer (DST): UTC-5 (CDT)
- Area code: 785

Gilman Township is a township in Nemaha County, Kansas, United States. As of the 2020 census, its population was 191.

== Geography ==
Gilman Township covers an area of 35.873 square miles (92.91 square kilometers).

=== Communities ===
- Oneida

=== Adjacent townships ===
- Washington Township, Nemaha County (north)
- Berwick Township, Nemaha County (northeast)
- Rock Creek Township, Nemaha County (east)
- Capioma Township, Nemaha County (southeast)
- Adams Township, Nemaha County (south)
- Mitchell Township, Nemaha County (southwest)
- Richmond Township, Nemaha County (west)
- Nemaha Township, Nemaha County (northwest)

=== Major highways ===
- US-36
