= Old Albany Schoolhouse =

- U.S. National Register of Historic Places
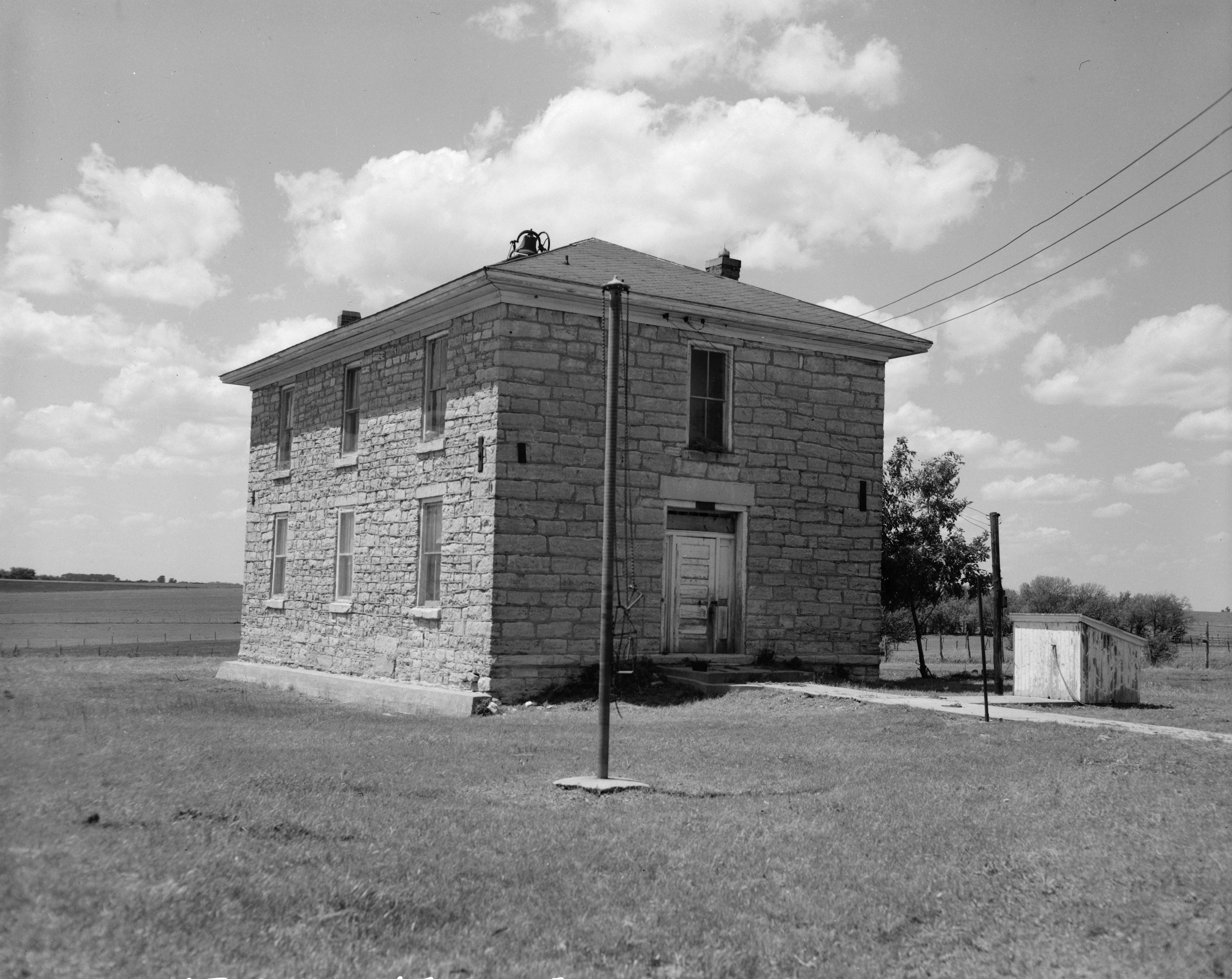

- Location within Kansas Location within the United States
- Nearest city: Sabetha, Kansas
- Coordinates: 39°56′32″N 95°48′16″W
- Area: 1.9 acres (0.77 ha)
- Built: 1866
- Architectural style: Plains Vernacular
- NRHP reference No.: 72000518
- Added to NRHP: April 13, 1972

The Old Albany Schoolhouse is a structure in Nemaha County, Kansas that was used as a school from the time of its construction circa 1866–67 to 1963. The school is one of the last remnants of the town of Albany, which declined after a railroad was built closer to the neighboring town of Sabetha. The school is a two-story rough limestone structure in the Plains Vernacular style. The corners are marked with quoins, and the school is covered by a hipped roof. After brief service as a church the school became the a museum in 1965, and now serves as the centerpiece of the Albany Museum complex. Other buildings include a railroad museum, windmill, caboose, antique automobiles, tractors and a 1950s period farmhouse. s

The school was placed on the National Register of Historic Places on April 13, 1972.
