= K-63 (Kansas highway) =

State highway in Kansas, U.S.

K-63
- K-63 highlighted in red

Route information
- Maintained by KDOT and the city of St. Marys
- Length: 58.769 mi (94.580 km)
- Existed: 1927–present

Major junctions
- South end: US-24 in St. Marys
- K-9 in Corning; US-36 by Seneca
- North end: N-50 near Du Bois, NE

Location
- Country: United States
- State: Kansas
- Counties: Nemaha, Pottawatomie

Highway system
- Kansas State Highway System; Interstate; US; State; Spurs
← K-62	→ K-64

K-63 is an approximately 58.8-mile-long (94.6 km) state highway in the U.S. state of Kansas. It is a north–south highway that serves small towns in the northeast part of the state. K-63's southern terminus is at U.S. Route 24 (US-24) in St. Marys and the northern terminus is a continuation as Nebraska Highway 50 (N-50) at the Nebraska border. The highway passes mostly through rural farmlands, however it does pass through the cities of Emmett, Havensville and Corning. It also passes along the edge of Seneca, where it has a short overlap with US-36.

Before state highways were numbered in Kansas there were auto trails. The southern terminus was part of the former Roosevelt National Highway and Golden Belt. The former Corn Belt Highway crosses K-63 in Havensville. A small section just south of Seneca and a few sections between Seneca and the Nebraska border follow the former Omaha-Topeka Trail. The highway also crosses the former Pikes Peak Ocean to Ocean Highway by Seneca. K-63 was first designated as a state highway in 1927. The highway has remained unchanged since, except for minor realignments by Emmett and Seneca.

== Route description ==
The Kansas Department of Transportation (KDOT) tracks the traffic levels on its highways. Along K-63 in 2019, they determined that on average the traffic varied from 475 vehicles per day between K-16 and Havensville to 4,700 vehicles per day along the overlap with US-36. The second highest was 3,720 vehicles per day between the southern terminus and Emmett. The only section of K-63 included in the National Highway System is its overlap with US-36. The National Highway System is a system of highways important to the nation's defense, economy, and mobility. K-63 also connects to the National Highway System at its southern terminus at US-24. The section of K-63 in St. Marys from the southern terminus to just north of Elm Street is maintained by the city.

=== Pottawatomie County ===
K-63's southern terminus is in St. Marys at US-24, also known as Bertrand Street. The highway has an at-grade crossing with a Union Pacific Railway (UP) track then continues northeast through the city as 6th Street. It curves northward then exits the city and intersects Delia Road about two miles (3.2 km) later. The surrounding area becomes more rural as the highway continues north for 1.6 miles (2.6 km) through flat grasslands then crosses Bourbonais Creek. K-63 continues through flat grasslands with scattered areas of trees for 2.9 miles (4.7 km) then begins to run along the west side of Emmett. After passing the city, the highway crosses Bartlett Creek then over a UP track. The highway continues for 3.6 miles (5.8 km) through flat farmlands, crosses Little Noxie Creek, then intersects St Clere Road, which travels east to Saint Clere. It continues north for 1.2 miles (1.9 km) then shifts about 1/2 mile (0.80 km) west.

K-63 continues through flat grasslands with scattered areas of trees for 4.5 miles (7.2 km) then is joined by K-16 from the east. The two highways continue for about one mile (1.6 km) then K-16 turns west toward Onaga. K-63 continues north through small rolling hills for about 1.25 miles (2.01 km) then curves slightly northwest. The highway continues a short distance, crosses Strait Creek, then enters Havensville as Commercial Street. The highway exits the city and continues for 1.1 miles (1.8 km) then crosses Vermillion Creek. K-63 then shifts east briefly then continues north through open grasslands with scattered areas of trees. After about 1.7 miles (2.7 km) the highway curves east and begins to follow the Pottawatomie–Nemaha county line. The highway continues east for one mile (1.6 km), where it crosses Vermillion Creek again, then curves north into the county .7 miles (1.1 km) later.

=== Nemaha County ===
K-63 continues north through flat farmlands transitioning to rolling hills for about 4.7 miles (7.6 km) then crosses Vermillion Creek again. The highway continues another roughly 1.2 miles (1.9 km) then is joined by K-9 from the east at the south city limits of Corning. The two highways continue north through the city as Seneca Street. After about 1/2 mile (0.80 km) the highway exits the city and passes by Corning Cemetery. They continue north through rolling hills transitioning to flat farmlands for about 4.3 miles (6.9 km) then K-9 turns west towards Centralia. K-63 continues north for about 2.5 miles (4.0 km) then curves northwest and crosses South Fork Big Nemaha River. The highway then turns north and continues about 1.8 miles (2.9 km) then curves northwest and crosses Tennessee Creek.

The roadway curves back north and continues for 2.3 miles (3.7 km) then intersects US-36. K-63 turns west and begins to overlap US-36. The two routes soon reach an at-grade crossing with a UP track, then crosses the South Fork Big Nemaha River again. They then reach the Seneca city limit, where K-63 turns north as US-36 continues west into the city. The highway continues north for about 1.2 miles (1.9 km) then shifts east slightly and crosses Wildcat Creek. It continues north through flat farmlands for roughly 5.2 miles (8.4 km) and crosses Turkey Creek. The roadway continues a short distance then intersects K-71, which travels east to Bern. K-63 continues north for 2.8 miles (4.5 km) through more farmlands then crosses into Nebraska and becomes Nebraska Highway 50.

== History ==
Prior to the formation of the Kansas state highway system, there were auto trails, which were an informal network of marked routes that existed in the United States and Canada in the early part of the 20th century. The southern terminus was part of the former Roosevelt National Highway and Golden Belt. The former Corn Belt Highway crosses K-63 in Havensville. A small section just south of Seneca and a few sections between Seneca and the Nebraska border follow the former Omaha-Topeka Trail. The highway also crosses the former Pikes Peak Ocean to Ocean Highway in Seneca.

K-63 was first designated as a state highway in 1927, to a highway running from US-40 in St. Marys north to the Nebraska border. K-16 was originally K-24 but was renumbered to K-16 between April 1933 and April 1936, due to US-24 being extended into Kansas. Also at this time US-24 was extended along US-40 at the southern terminus. Then between 1953 and 1956, US-40 was moved to a new alignment further south. In a February 21, 1939 resolution, it was approved to realign a small section slightly south of Emmett to eliminate three curves and straighten the road. Originally US-36 overlapped K-63 for a mile north out of Seneca, then turned east and left K-63 towards Oneida. Then in a March 21, 1939 resolution, it was approved to realign US-36 between Seneca and Fairview on a straight alignment, which would eliminate the overlap with K-63. The new alignment of US-36 was completed between 1944 and 1945.

In a May 28, 1952 resolution, it was approved to realign K-63 slightly north of Seneca to eliminate two turns. K-9 originally turned south in Centralia then turned east to K-63 in Corning. Then in a March 9, 1955 resolution, it was approved to realign K-9 to continue east from Centralia directly to K-63 then overlap K-63 south to Corning, then turn east in Corning and leave K-63, the project was completed between 1961 and 1963. K-63 originally curved west onto 140th Road, crossed the South Fork Big Nemaha River, then turned north at the Seneca city limit and crossed US-36. Then in an August 29, 1956 resolution, it was approved to realign K-63 to go directly north to US-36, then overlap US-36 to the original K-63 crossing and turn north.

== Major junctions ==
County	Location	mi	km	Destinations	Notes
Pottawatomie	St. Marys	0.000	0.000	US-24 (Bertrand Avenue) – Topeka, Manhattan	Southern terminus; road continues as 6th Street
Pottawatomie	Lincoln Township	18.892	30.404	K-16 east – Holton	South end of K-16 overlap
Pottawatomie	Lincoln–Grant township line	19.718	31.733	K-16 west – Onaga	North end of K-16 overlap
Nemaha	Corning	46.921	75.512	K-9 east – Netawaka	South end of K-9 overlap
Nemaha	Illinois Township	47.681	76.735	K-9 west – Centralia	North end of K-9 overlap
Nemaha	Richmond Township	46.921	75.512	US-36 east – Hiawatha	South end of US-36 overlap
Nemaha	Seneca	47.681	76.735	US-36 west (North Street) – Marysville	North end of US-36 overlap
Nemaha	Nemaha Township	55.992	90.110	K-71 east – Bern	Western terminus of K-71
40th parallel north		58.769	94.580	N-50 north / 240th Road (702 Road) – Pawnee City	Kansas–Nebraska line; highway continues into Nebraska as N-50
1.000 mi = 1.609 km; 1.000 km = 0.621 mi: Concurrency terminus

== See also ==
- List of state highways in Kansas
- List of highways numbered 63
