= Rock Creek Township, Indiana =

Rock Creek Township, Indiana may refer to one of the following places:

- Rock Creek Township, Bartholomew County, Indiana
- Rock Creek Township, Carroll County, Indiana
- Rock Creek Township, Huntington County, Indiana
- Rockcreek Township, Wells County, Indiana

== See also ==
- Rock Creek Township (disambiguation)
