= Nemaha Township, Kansas =

Township in Nemaha County, Kansas, U.S.

Nemaha Township
- Township
- Location within Nemaha County
- Coordinates: 39.957383°N 96.070313°W
- Country: United States
- State: Kansas
- County: Nemaha

Area
  - Total: 35.437 sq mi (91.78 km^{2})
  - Land: 35.437 sq mi (91.78 km^{2})
  - Water: 0 sq mi (0 km^{2}) 0%

Population (2020)
  - Total: 108
  - Density: 3.05/sq mi (1.18/km^{2})
- Time zone: UTC-6 (CST)
  - Summer (DST): UTC-5 (CDT)
- Area code: 785

Nemaha Township is a township in Nemaha County, Kansas, United States. As of the 2020 census, its population was 108.

== Geography ==
Nemaha Township covers an area of 35.437 square miles (91.78 square kilometers).

=== Adjacent townships ===
- Washington Township, Nemaha County (east)
- Gilman Township, Nemaha County (southeast)
- Richmond Township, Nemaha County (south)
- Marion Township, Nemaha County (southwest)
- Clear Creek Township, Nemaha County (west)

=== Major highways ===
- K-63
- K-71
