= Harrison Township, Nemaha County, Kansas =

Township in Nemaha County, Kansas, U.S.

Harrison Township
- Township
- Location within Nemaha County
- Coordinates: 39.695568°N 95.955095°W
- Country: United States
- State: Kansas
- County: Nemaha

Area
  - Total: 36.022 sq mi (93.30 km^{2})
  - Land: 35.945 sq mi (93.10 km^{2})
  - Water: 0.077 sq mi (0.20 km^{2}) 0.21%

Population (2020)
  - Total: 306
  - Density: 8.51/sq mi (3.29/km^{2})
- Time zone: UTC-6 (CST)
  - Summer (DST): UTC-5 (CDT)
- Area code: 785

Harrison Township is a township in Nemaha County, Kansas, United States. As of the 2020 census, its population was 306.

== Geography ==
Harrison Township covers an area of 36.022 square miles (93.30 square kilometers).

=== Communities ===
- Goff
- Kelly

=== Adjacent townships ===
- Adams Township, Nemaha County (north)
- Capioma Township, Nemaha County (northeast)
- Granada Township, Nemaha County (east)
- Wetmore Township, Nemaha County (southeast)
- Reilly Township, Nemaha County (south)
- Red Vermillion Township, Nemaha County (southwest)
- Illinois Township, Nemaha County (west)
- Mitchell Township, Nemaha County (northwest)

=== Major highways ===
- K-9
