= Adams Township, Kansas =

Township in Nemaha County, Kansas, U.S.

Adams Township
- Township
- Location within Morton County
- Coordinates: 39°46′38″N 95°57′36″W
- Country: United States
- State: Kansas
- County: Nemaha

Area
  - Total: 36.1 sq mi (93.4 km^{2})
  - Land: 36.1 sq mi (93.4 km^{2})
  - Water: 0 sq mi (0.0 km^{2})
- Elevation: 1,207 ft (368 m)

Population (2020)
  - Total: 171
  - Density: 4.74/sq mi (1.83/km^{2})
- Time zone: UTC-6 (CST)
  - Summer (DST): UTC-5 (CDT)
- Area code: 785
- FIPS code: 20-00275
- GNIS feature ID: 0472955

Adams Township is a township in Nemaha County, Kansas, United States. As of the 2020 census, its population was 171.

== Geography ==
=== Adjacent townships ===
- Gilman Township, Nemaha County (north)
- Rock Creek Township, Nemaha County (northeast)
- Capioma Township, Nemaha County (east)
- Granada Township, Nemaha County (southeast)
- Harrison Township, Nemaha County (south)
- Illinois Township, Nemaha County (southwest)
- Mitchell Township, Nemaha County (west)
- Richmond Township, Nemaha County (northwest)
