= Clear Creek Township, Nemaha County, Kansas =

Township in Nemaha County, Kansas, U.S.

Clear Creek Township
- Township
- Location within Nemaha County
- Coordinates: 39.957579°N 96.182882°W
- Country: United States
- State: Kansas
- County: Nemaha

Area
  - Total: 35.765 sq mi (92.63 km^{2})
  - Land: 35.765 sq mi (92.63 km^{2})
  - Water: 0 sq mi (0 km^{2}) 0%

Population (2020)
  - Total: 127
  - Density: 3.55/sq mi (1.37/km^{2})
- Time zone: UTC-6 (CST)
  - Summer (DST): UTC-5 (CDT)
- Area code: 785

Clear Creek Township is a township in Nemaha County, Kansas, United States. As of the 2020 census, its population was 127.

== Geography ==
Clear Creek Township covers an area of 35.765 square miles (92.63 square kilometers).

=== Adjacent townships ===
- Nemaha Township, Nemaha County (east)
- Richmond Township, Nemaha County (southeast)
- Marion Township, Nemaha County (south)
- Murray Township, Marshall County (southwest)
- St. Bridget Township, Marshall County (west)
