= Richmond Township, Nemaha County, Kansas =

Township in Nemaha County, Kansas, U.S.

Richmond Township
- Township
- Location within Nemaha County
- Coordinates: 39.872206°N 96.070415°W
- Country: United States
- State: Kansas
- County: Nemaha

Area
  - Total: 33.961 sq mi (87.96 km^{2})
  - Land: 33.961 sq mi (87.96 km^{2})
  - Water: 0 sq mi (0 km^{2}) 0%

Population (2020)
  - Total: 512
  - Density: 15.1/sq mi (5.82/km^{2})
- Time zone: UTC-6 (CST)
  - Summer (DST): UTC-5 (CDT)
- Area code: 785

Richmond Township is a township in Nemaha County, Kansas, United States. As of the 2020 census, its population was 512.

== Geography ==
Richmond Township covers an area of 33.961 square miles (87.96 square kilometers).

=== Communities ===
- St. Benedict

=== Adjacent townships ===
- Nemaha Township, Nemaha County (north)
- Washington Township, Nemaha County (northeast)
- Gilman Township, Nemaha County (east)
- Adams Township, Nemaha County (southeast)
- Mitchell Township, Nemaha County (south)
- Center Township, Nemaha County (southwest)
- Marion Township, Nemaha County (west)
- Clear Creek Township, Nemaha County (northwest)

=== Major highways ===
- US-36
- K-63
- K-178
