= Marion Township, Nemaha County, Kansas =

Township in Nemaha County, Kansas, U.S.

Marion Township
- Township
- Location within Nemaha County
- Coordinates: 39.872805°N 96.18366°W
- Country: United States
- State: Kansas
- County: Nemaha

Area
  - Total: 36.203 sq mi (93.77 km^{2})
  - Land: 36.165 sq mi (93.67 km^{2})
  - Water: 0.038 sq mi (0.098 km^{2}) 0.11%

Population (2020)
  - Total: 420
  - Density: 12/sq mi (4.5/km^{2})
- Time zone: UTC-6 (CST)
  - Summer (DST): UTC-5 (CDT)
- Area code: 785

Marion Township is a township in Nemaha County, Kansas, United States. As of the 2020 census, its population was 420.

== Geography ==
Marion Township covers an area of 36.203 square miles (93.77 square kilometers).

=== Communities ===
- Baileyville

=== Adjacent townships ===
- Clear Creek Township, Nemaha County (north)
- Nemaha Township, Nemaha County (northeast)
- Richmond Township, Nemaha County (east)
- Mitchell Township, Nemaha County (southeast)
- Center Township, Nemaha County (south)
- Lincoln Township, Marshall County (southwest)
- Murray Township, Marshall County (west)
- St. Bridget Township, Marshall County (northwest)

=== Major highways ===
- US-36
