= Berwick Township, Kansas =

Township in Nemaha County, Kansas, U.S.

Berwick Township
- Township
- Location within Nemaha County
- Coordinates: 39.950994°N 95.836948°W
- Country: United States
- State: Kansas
- County: Nemaha

Area
  - Total: 36.069 sq mi (93.42 km^{2})
  - Land: 36.061 sq mi (93.40 km^{2})
  - Water: 0.008 sq mi (0.021 km^{2}) 0.02%

Population (2020)
  - Total: 414
  - Density: 11.5/sq mi (4.43/km^{2})
- Time zone: UTC-6 (CST)
  - Summer (DST): UTC-5 (CDT)
- Area code: 785

Berwick Township is a township in Nemaha County, Kansas, United States. As of the 2020 census, its population was 414.

== Geography ==
Berwick Township covers an area of 36.069 square miles (93.42 square kilometers).

=== Communities ===
- Berwick

=== Adjacent townships ===
- Morrill Township, Brown County (east)
- Rock Creek Township, Nemaha County (south)
- Gilman Township, Nemaha County (southwest)
- Washington Township, Nemaha County (west)

=== Major highways ===
- US-75
