= Berwick, Kansas =

Unincorporated community in Nemaha County, Kansas

Coordinates: 39°56′00″N 95°50′41″W

Berwick is an unincorporated community in Nemaha County, Kansas, United States.

== History ==
Berwick was a station on the Chicago, Rock Island and Pacific Railroad.

In 1916, Berwick contained but four houses.

A post office was opened in Berwick in 1887, and remained in operation until it was discontinued in 1937.

== Education ==
This community and nearby rural areas are served by Prairie Hills USD 113 public school district.
