= Rock Creek Township, Nemaha County, Kansas =

Township in Nemaha County, Kansas, U.S.

Rock Creek Township
- Township
- Location within Nemaha County
- Coordinates: 39.864028°N 95.850102°W
- Country: United States
- State: Kansas
- County: Nemaha

Area
  - Total: 34.201 sq mi (88.58 km^{2})
  - Land: 33.973 sq mi (87.99 km^{2})
  - Water: 0.228 sq mi (0.59 km^{2}) 0.67%

Population (2020)
  - Total: 429
  - Density: 12.6/sq mi (4.88/km^{2})
- Time zone: UTC-6 (CST)
  - Summer (DST): UTC-5 (CDT)
- Area code: 785

Rock Creek Township is a township in Nemaha County, Kansas, United States. As of the 2020 census, its population was 429.

== Geography ==
Rock Creek Township covers an area of 34.201 square miles (88.58 square kilometers).

=== Adjacent townships ===
- Berwick Township, Nemaha County (north)
- Walnut Township, Brown County (east)
- Capioma Township, Nemaha County (south)
- Adams Township, Nemaha County (southwest)
- Gilman Township, Nemaha County (west)
- Washington Township, Nemaha County (northwest)

=== Major highways ===
- US-36
