= Woodlawn, Kansas =

Unincorporated community in Nemaha County, Kansas

Coordinates: 39°47′00″N 95°51′53″W

Woodlawn is an unincorporated community in Nemaha County, Kansas, United States. It is located at the intersection of 120th (Springtown Road) and U Roads.

== History ==
Woodlawn was founded in 1881.

A post office was opened in Woodlawn in 1881, and remained in operation until it was discontinued in 1906.

== Education ==
This community and nearby rural areas are served by Prairie Hills USD 113 public school district.
