= Capioma, Kansas =

Unincorporated community in Nemaha County, Kansas

Coordinates: 39°46′36″N 95°49′13″W

Capioma is an unincorporated community in Capioma Township, Nemaha County, Kansas, United States. It is located at the intersection of 116th Rd and W4 Rd.

== History ==
Capioma was platted in 1857. It was named for an Indian chief.

A post office was opened in Capioma in 1857, and remained in operation until it was discontinued in 1906.

== Education ==
This community and nearby rural areas are served by Prairie Hills USD 113 public school district.
