= Oneida, Kansas =

City in Nemaha County, Kansas

- City
- Location within Nemaha County and Kansas

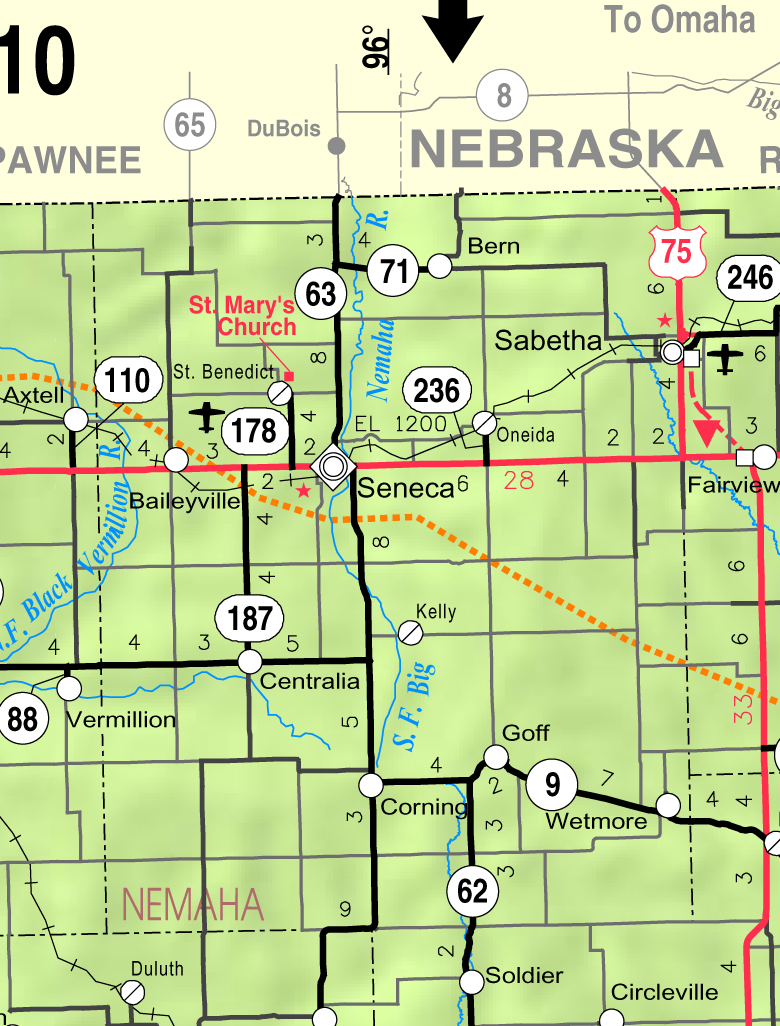
- KDOT map of Nemaha County (legend)
- Coordinates: 39°52′00″N 95°56′23″W
- Country: United States
- State: Kansas
- County: Nemaha
- Platted: 1873
- Incorporated: 1884
- Named for: Oneida people

Area
  - Total: 0.23 sq mi (0.60 km^{2})
  - Land: 0.23 sq mi (0.60 km^{2})
  - Water: 0 sq mi (0.00 km^{2})
- Elevation: 1,273 ft (388 m)

Population (2020)
  - Total: 61
  - Density: 260/sq mi (100/km^{2})
- Time zone: UTC-6 (CST)
  - Summer (DST): UTC-5 (CDT)
- ZIP Code: 66522
- Area code: 785
- FIPS code: 20-52900
- GNIS ID: 2396068

Oneida is a city in Nemaha County, Kansas, United States. As of the 2020 census, the population of the city was 61.

== History ==
Oneida was laid out circa 1873 and was named after the Oneida people. The town's streets were named after the main thoroughfares of Chicago.

== Geography ==
According to the United States Census Bureau, the city has a total area of 0.24 square miles (0.62 km^{2}), all land.

== Demographics ==
Historical population
Census	Pop.	Note	%±
1880	163		—
1890	311		90.8%
1900	279		−10.3%
1910	211		−24.4%
1920	276		30.8%
1930	224		−18.8%
1940	187		−16.5%
1950	138		−26.2%
1960	119		−13.8%
1970	112		−5.9%
1980	120		7.1%
1990	79		−34.2%
2000	70		−11.4%
2010	75		7.1%
2020	61		−18.7%
U.S. Decennial Census

=== 2020 census ===
The 2020 United States census counted 61 people, 9 households, and 5 families in Oneida. The population density was 265.2 per square mile (102.4/km^{2}). There were 26 housing units at an average density of 113.0 per square mile (43.6/km^{2}). The racial makeup was 91.8% (56) white or European American (91.8% non-Hispanic white), 0.0% (0) black or African-American, 1.64% (1) Native American or Alaska Native, 0.0% (0) Asian, 0.0% (0) Pacific Islander or Native Hawaiian, 0.0% (0) from other races, and 6.56% (4) from two or more races. Hispanic or Latino of any race was 4.92% (3) of the population.

Of the 9 households, 11.1% had children under the age of 18; 55.6% were married couples living together; 0.0% had a female householder with no spouse or partner present. 33.3% of households consisted of individuals and 22.2% had someone living alone who was 65 years of age or older. The average household size was 2.6 and the average family size was 4.7. The percent of those with a bachelor's degree or higher was estimated to be 3.3% of the population.

37.7% of the population was under the age of 18, 13.1% from 18 to 24, 16.4% from 25 to 44, 24.6% from 45 to 64, and 8.2% who were 65 years of age or older. The median age was 23.9 years. For every 100 females, there were 110.3 males. For every 100 females ages 18 and older, there were 100.0 males.

The 2016–2020 5-year American Community Survey estimates show that the median household income was $21,435 (with a margin of error of +/- $762). Males had a median income of $18,981 (+/- $3,010). The median income for those above 16 years old was $17,870 (+/- $3,910). Approximately, 50.0% of families and 47.7% of the population were below the poverty line, including 51.4% of those under the age of 18 and 25.0% of those ages 65 or over.

=== 2010 census ===
As of the census of 2010, there were 75 people, 26 households, and 17 families living in the city. The population density was 312.5 inhabitants per square mile (120.7/km^{2}). There were 34 housing units at an average density of 141.7 per square mile (54.7/km^{2}). The racial makeup of the city was 98.7% White and 1.3% African American.

There were 26 households, of which 38.5% had children under the age of 18 living with them, 65.4% were married couples living together, and 34.6% were non-families. 23.1% of all households were made up of individuals, and 3.8% had someone living alone who was 65 years of age or older. The average household size was 2.88 and the average family size was 3.59.

The median age in the city was 34.5 years. 36% of residents were under the age of 18; 4% were between the ages of 18 and 24; 28% were from 25 to 44; 20.1% were from 45 to 64; and 12% were 65 years of age or older. The gender makeup of the city was 46.7% male and 53.3% female.

=== 2000 census ===
As of the census of 2000, there were 70 people, 25 households, and 18 families living in the city. The population density was 302.1 inhabitants per square mile (116.6/km^{2}). There were 36 housing units at an average density of 155.3 per square mile (60.0/km^{2}). The racial makeup of the city was 97.14% White and 2.86% African American.

There were 25 households, out of which 40.0% had children under the age of 18 living with them, 60.0% were married couples living together, 8.0% had a female householder with no husband present, and 28.0% were non-families. 28.0% of all households were made up of individuals, and 20.0% had someone living alone who was 65 years of age or older. The average household size was 2.80 and the average family size was 3.50.

In the city, the population was spread out, with 30.0% under the age of 18, 8.6% from 18 to 24, 28.6% from 25 to 44, 18.6% from 45 to 64, and 14.3% who were 65 years of age or older. The median age was 33 years. For every 100 females, there were 133.3 males. For every 100 females age 18 and over, there were 122.7 males.

The median income for a household in the city was $45,417, and the median income for a family was $48,750. Males had a median income of $33,125 versus $23,750 for females. The per capita income for the city was $16,138. There were no families and 6.7% of the population living below the poverty line, including no under eighteens and none of those over 64.

== Education ==
The community is served by Nemaha Central USD 115 public school district.
