= Lake Nemaha Dam Guardrail =

- U.S. National Register of Historic Places
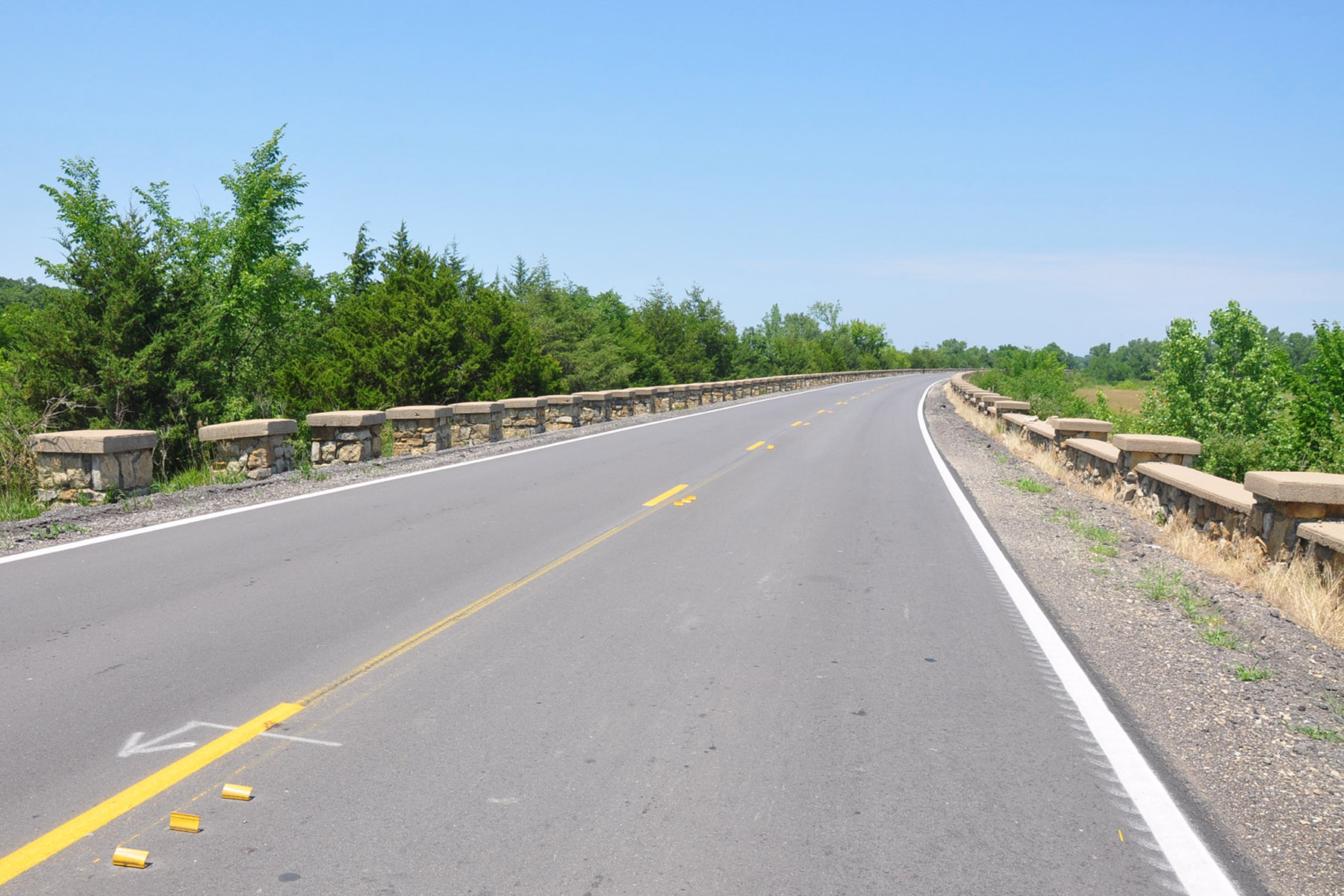
- Lake Nemaha Dam Guardrail in 2021

- Location within Kansas Location within the United States
- Location: 5.12 miles south of Seneca, KS on Hwy 63, Seneca, Kansas
- Coordinates: 39°45′56″N 96°02′06″W
- Area: Less than one acre
- Built: c. 1937
- Built by: Civilian Conservation Corps Co. 2735
- Architectural style: Park Rustic
- MPS: New Deal-Era Resources of Kansas MPS
- NRHP reference No.: 08000620
- Added to NRHP: July 2, 2008

The Lake Nemaha Dam Guardrail, located about 5 miles (8.0 km) miles south of Seneca, Kansas on Kansas Highway 63, was listed on the National Register of Historic Places in 2008. It was built by the Civilian Conservation Corps in about 1937.

The guardrail runs along the highway as it crosses over the dam which formed Lake Nemaha. The listing include 216 contributing objects: "215 posts or pillars of quarried stone capped with three-foot square concrete blocks on the west side of the highway, and a single continuous stone parapet wall on the east side of the highway".

The Lake Nemaha Dam was built by the Civilian Conservation Corps in about 1933. Lake Nemaha existed until 1986 when its spillway washed out.
