= Prairie Hills USD 113 =

Public school district in Sabetha, Kansas

Address
- 1619 S. Old Hwy 75 Sabetha, Kansas, 66534; United States
- Coordinates: 39°53′40″N 95°47′24″W

District information
- Type: Public
- Grades: K to 12
- Schools: 4

Other information
- Website: usd113.org

Prairie Hills USD 113 is a public unified school district headquartered in Sabetha, Kansas, United States. The district includes the communities of Sabetha, Axtell, Bern, Goff, Morrill, Summerfield, Wetmore, Berwick, Capioma, Woodlawn, and nearby rural areas.

== Schools ==
The school district operates the following schools:

- Sabetha High School
- Sabetha Junior High School
- Sabetha Elementary School
- Axtell Public School

== History ==
After Dawson-Verdon Public Schools in Nebraska dissolved in 2004, some students chose the public schools of Sabetha.

It was formed in 2010 by the merger of Sabetha USD 441 and Axtel USD 488.

Closed schools:

- Bern High School - closed 2012
- Bern Elementary School - closed 2012
- Summerfield Elementary School - closed 2014
- Wetmore Academic Center - closed 2023

== See also ==
- Kansas State Department of Education
- Kansas State High School Activities Association
- List of high schools in Kansas
- List of unified school districts in Kansas
