= St. Benedict, Kansas =

Unincorporated community in Nemaha County, Kansas

- CDP
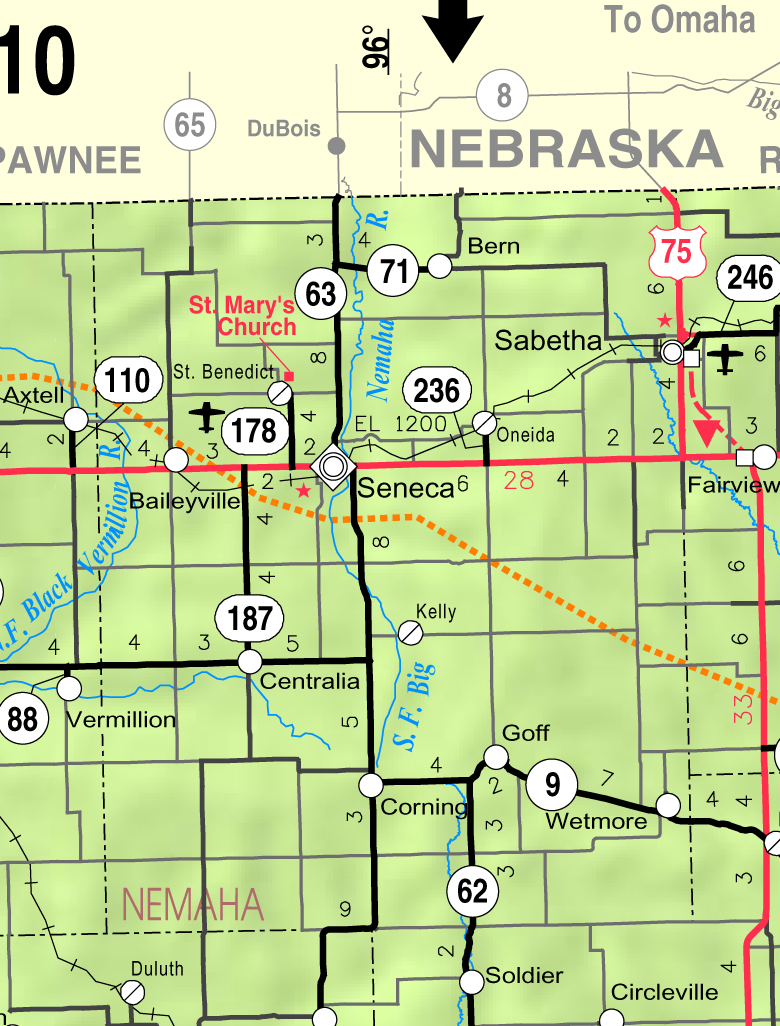
- KDOT map of Nemaha County (legend)

- Location within Kansas Location within the United States
- Coordinates: 39°53′34″N 96°06′11″W
- Country: United States
- State: Kansas
- County: Nemaha
- Named for: St. Benedict
- Elevation: 1,139 ft (347 m)

Population (2020)
  - Total: 50
- Time zone: UTC-6 (CST)
  - Summer (DST): UTC-5 (CDT)
- Area code: 785
- FIPS code: 20-62075
- GNIS ID: 2804517

St. Benedict is a census-designated place (CDP) in Nemaha County, Kansas, United States. As of the 2020 census, the population was 50. It is located three miles north of the western edge of Seneca.

== History ==
A post office was opened in Saint Benedict in 1883, and remained in operation until it was discontinued in 1902.

The community currently consists of over a dozen homes near the tall St. Mary's Church, which was built in 1893.

== Demographics ==
Historical population
Census	Pop.	Note	%±
2020	50		—
U.S. Decennial Census

== Education ==
The community is served by Nemaha Central USD 115 public school district.
