= Rock Creek Township, Cowley County, Kansas =

Rock Creek Township
- Township
- Location in Cowley County
- Coordinates: 37°25′55″N 096°58′16″W
- Country: United States
- State: Kansas
- County: Cowley

Area
  - Total: 35.58 sq mi (92.14 km^{2})
  - Land: 35.38 sq mi (91.64 km^{2})
  - Water: 0.20 sq mi (0.51 km^{2}) 0.55%
- Elevation: 1,217 ft (371 m)

Population (2020)
  - Total: 266
  - Density: 7.52/sq mi (2.90/km^{2})
- GNIS feature ID: 470020

Rock Creek Township is a township in Cowley County, Kansas, United States. As of the 2020 census, its population was 266.

Rock Creek Township covers an area of 35.58 square miles (92.2 km^{2}) and contains no incorporated settlements.

== Transportation ==
Rock Creek Township contains one airport or landing strip, Eaton Acres Landing Strip.
