= Rock Creek Township, Coffey County, Kansas =

Rock Creek Township
- Township
- Location in Coffey County
- Coordinates: 38°23′25″N 095°35′26″W
- Country: United States
- State: Kansas
- County: Coffey

Area
  - Total: 54.41 sq mi (140.93 km^{2})
  - Land: 53.87 sq mi (139.53 km^{2})
  - Water: 0.54 sq mi (1.41 km^{2}) 1%
- Elevation: 1,132 ft (345 m)

Population (2020)
  - Total: 914
  - Density: 17.0/sq mi (6.55/km^{2})
- GNIS feature ID: 0477569

Rock Creek Township is a township in Coffey County, Kansas, United States. As of the 2020 census, its population was 914.

== Geography ==
Rock Creek Township covers an area of 54.42 square miles (140.9 km^{2}) and contains one incorporated settlement, Waverly. According to the USGS, it contains three cemeteries: Pleasant View, Rock Creek and Waverly.

== Transportation ==
Rock Creek Township contains one airport or landing strip, Schoolcraft Airport.
