= Bern, Kansas =

City in Nemaha County, Kansas

- City
- Location within Nemaha County and Kansas

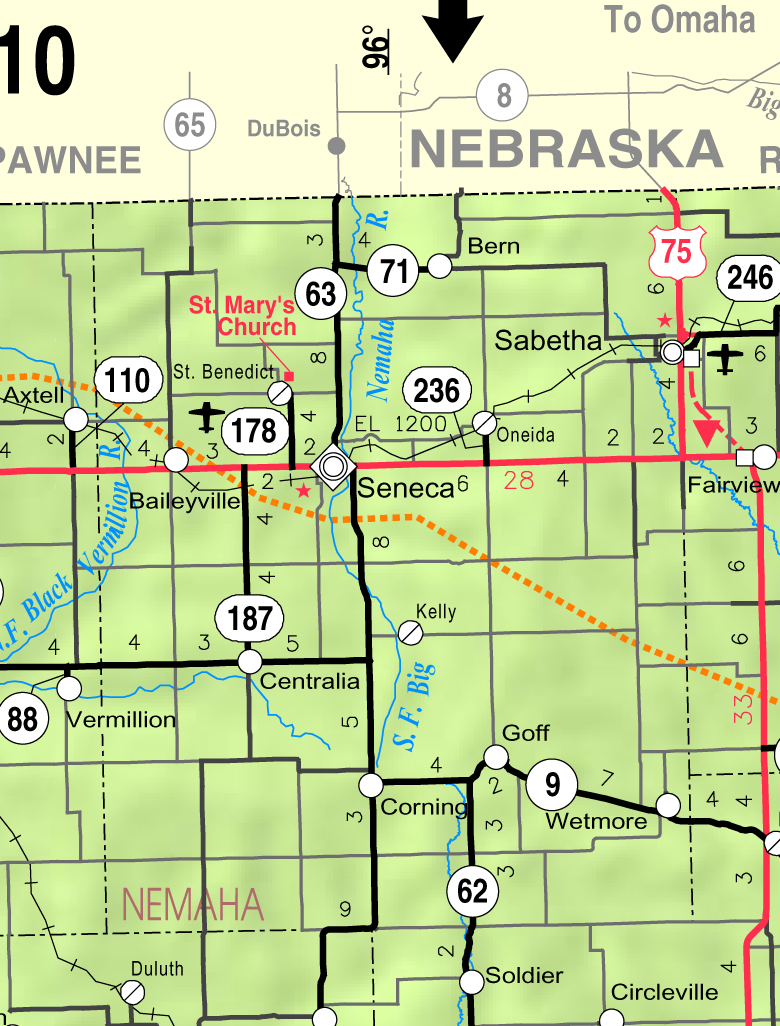
- KDOT map of Nemaha County (legend)
- Coordinates: 39°57′41″N 95°58′16″W
- Country: United States
- State: Kansas
- County: Nemaha
- Incorporated: 1910
- Named for: Bern, Switzerland

Area
  - Total: 0.29 sq mi (0.74 km^{2})
  - Land: 0.29 sq mi (0.74 km^{2})
  - Water: 0 sq mi (0.00 km^{2})
- Elevation: 1,270 ft (390 m)

Population (2020)
  - Total: 161
  - Density: 560/sq mi (220/km^{2})
- Time zone: UTC-6 (CST)
  - Summer (DST): UTC-5 (CDT)
- ZIP Code: 66408
- Area code: 785
- FIPS code: 20-06275
- GNIS ID: 2394147

Bern is a city in Nemaha County, Kansas, United States. As of the 2020 census, the population of the city was 161.

== History ==
Bern got its start in the late 1880s, following construction of the railroad through that territory. It was named by Swiss immigrants after Bern, the capital of Switzerland.

== Geography ==
Bern is located at 39°57′44″N 95°58′19″W (39.9622218, -95.9719422). According to the United States Census Bureau, the city has a total area of 0.29 square miles (0.75 km^{2}), all land.

== Demographics ==
Historical population
Census	Pop.	Note	%±
1930	306		—
1940	236		−22.9%
1950	216		−8.5%
1960	206		−4.6%
1970	191		−7.3%
1980	220		15.2%
1990	190		−13.6%
2000	204		7.4%
2010	166		−18.6%
2020	161		−3.0%
U.S. Decennial Census

=== 2020 census ===
The 2020 United States census counted 161 people, 66 households, and 39 families in Bern. The population density was 566.9 per square mile (218.9/km^{2}). There were 88 housing units at an average density of 309.9 per square mile (119.6/km^{2}). The racial makeup was 90.06% (145) white or European American (90.06% non-Hispanic white), 0.0% (0) black or African-American, 1.86% (3) Native American or Alaska Native, 0.0% (0) Asian, 0.0% (0) Pacific Islander or Native Hawaiian, 3.11% (5) from other races, and 4.97% (8) from two or more races. Hispanic or Latino of any race was 3.73% (6) of the population.

Of the 66 households, 27.3% had children under the age of 18; 53.0% were married couples living together; 21.2% had a female householder with no spouse or partner present. 31.8% of households consisted of individuals and 15.2% had someone living alone who was 65 years of age or older. The average household size was 2.6 and the average family size was 2.9. The percent of those with a bachelor's degree or higher was estimated to be 18.0% of the population.

26.1% of the population was under the age of 18, 7.5% from 18 to 24, 22.4% from 25 to 44, 28.6% from 45 to 64, and 15.5% who were 65 years of age or older. The median age was 38.8 years. For every 100 females, there were 94.0 males. For every 100 females ages 18 and older, there were 101.7 males.

The 2016–2020 5-year American Community Survey estimates show that the median household income was $60,000 (with a margin of error of +/- $36,761) and the median family income was $50,625 (+/- $45,815). Males had a median income of $35,000 (+/- $15,875) versus $37,500 (+/- $34,708) for females. The median income for those above 16 years old was $36,250 (+/- $20,828). Approximately, 27.9% of families and 30.3% of the population were below the poverty line, including 64.3% of those under the age of 18 and 4.2% of those ages 65 or over.

=== 2010 census ===
As of the census of 2010, there were 166 people, 81 households, and 45 families residing in the city. The population density was 572.4 inhabitants per square mile (221.0/km^{2}). There were 95 housing units at an average density of 327.6 per square mile (126.5/km^{2}). The racial makeup of the city was 91.0% White, 0.6% African American, 3.0% Native American, 3.0% from other races, and 2.4% from two or more races. Hispanic or Latino of any race were 6.0% of the population.

There were 81 households, of which 21.0% had children under the age of 18 living with them, 48.1% were married couples living together, 4.9% had a female householder with no husband present, 2.5% had a male householder with no wife present, and 44.4% were non-families. 40.7% of all households were made up of individuals, and 16% had someone living alone who was 65 years of age or older. The average household size was 2.05 and the average family size was 2.73.

The median age in the city was 43.5 years. 18.7% of residents were under the age of 18; 10.1% were between the ages of 18 and 24; 22.8% were from 25 to 44; 28.2% were from 45 to 64; and 19.9% were 65 years of age or older. The gender makeup of the city was 51.8% male and 48.2% female.

=== 2000 census ===
As of the census of 2000, there were 204 people, 86 households, and 55 families residing in the city. The population density was 748.7 inhabitants per square mile (289.1/km^{2}). There were 102 housing units at an average density of 374.4 per square mile (144.6/km^{2}). The racial makeup of the city was 99.51% White, and 0.49% from two or more races. Hispanic or Latino of any race were 1.96% of the population.

There were 86 households, out of which 37.2% had children under the age of 18 living with them, 55.8% were married couples living together, 3.5% had a female householder with no husband present, and 34.9% were non-families, and 24.4% had someone living alone who was 65 years of age or older. The average household size was 2.37 and the average family size was 3.02.

In the city, the population was spread out, with 27.5% under the age of 18, 6.4% from 18 to 24, 26.0% from 25 to 44, 21.6% from 45 to 64, and 18.6% who were 65 years of age or older. The median age was 40 years. For every 100 females, there were 92.5 males. For every 100 females age 18 and over, there were 85.0 males.

The median income for a household in the city was $40,417, and the median income for a family was $49,000. Males had a median income of $34,063 versus $21,563 for females. The per capita income for the city was $16,254. About 7.4% of families and 7.1% of the population were below the poverty line, including 5.6% of those under the age of eighteen and 5.7% of those 65 or over.

== Education ==
The community is served by Prairie Hills USD 113 public school district, formed in 2010 by the merger of Sabetha USD 441 and Axtel USD 488. The school board voted close Bern Elementary and High School.

== Notable person ==
- Herman F. Krueger, Speaker of the Wyoming House of Representatives

== See also ==
- Tornado outbreak of May 20–22, 2019
