= Sabetha, Kansas =

City in Brown and Nemaha Counties of Kansas

- City
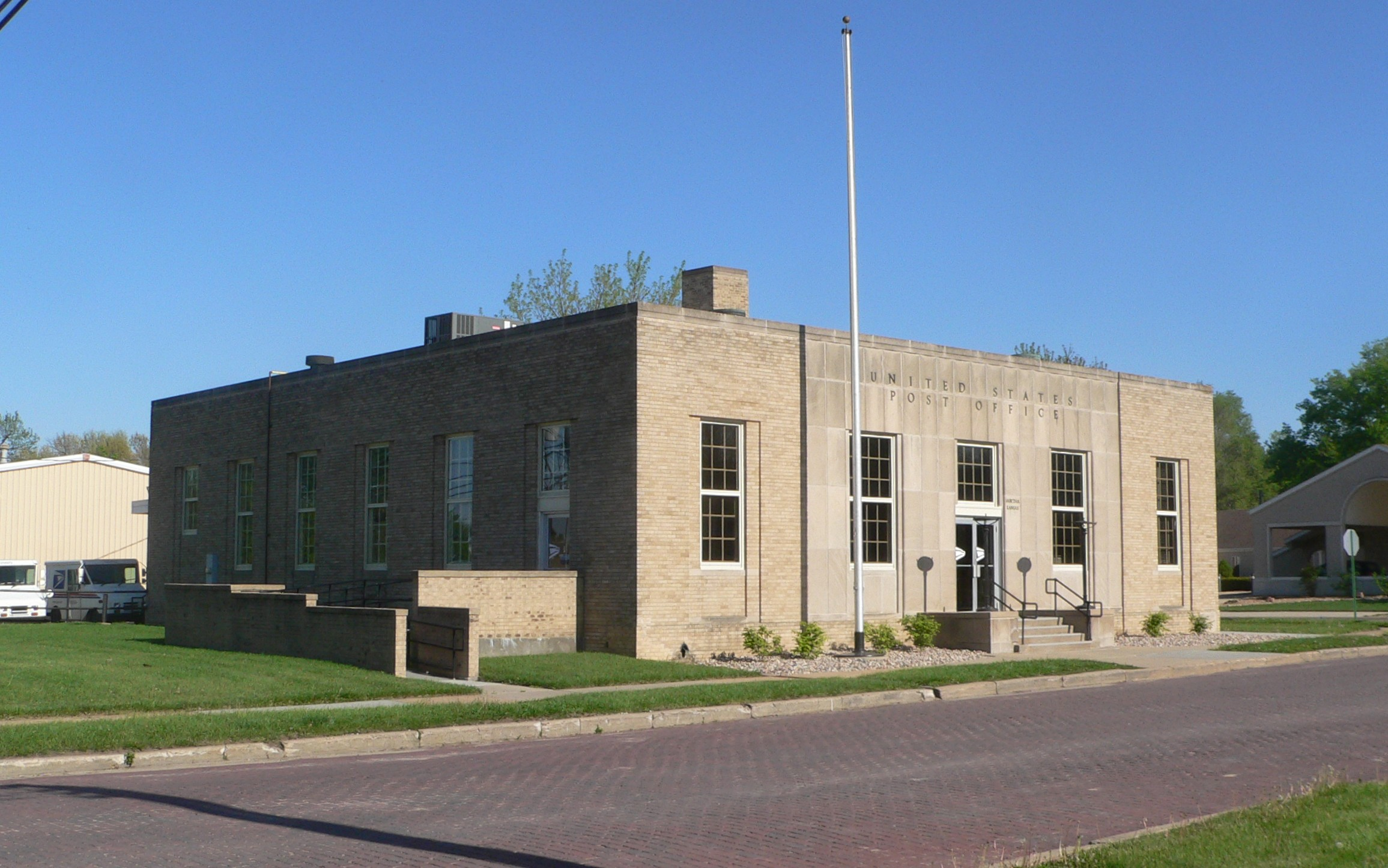
- US Post Office in Sabetha (2015)

- Seal

- Location within Nemaha County and Kansas

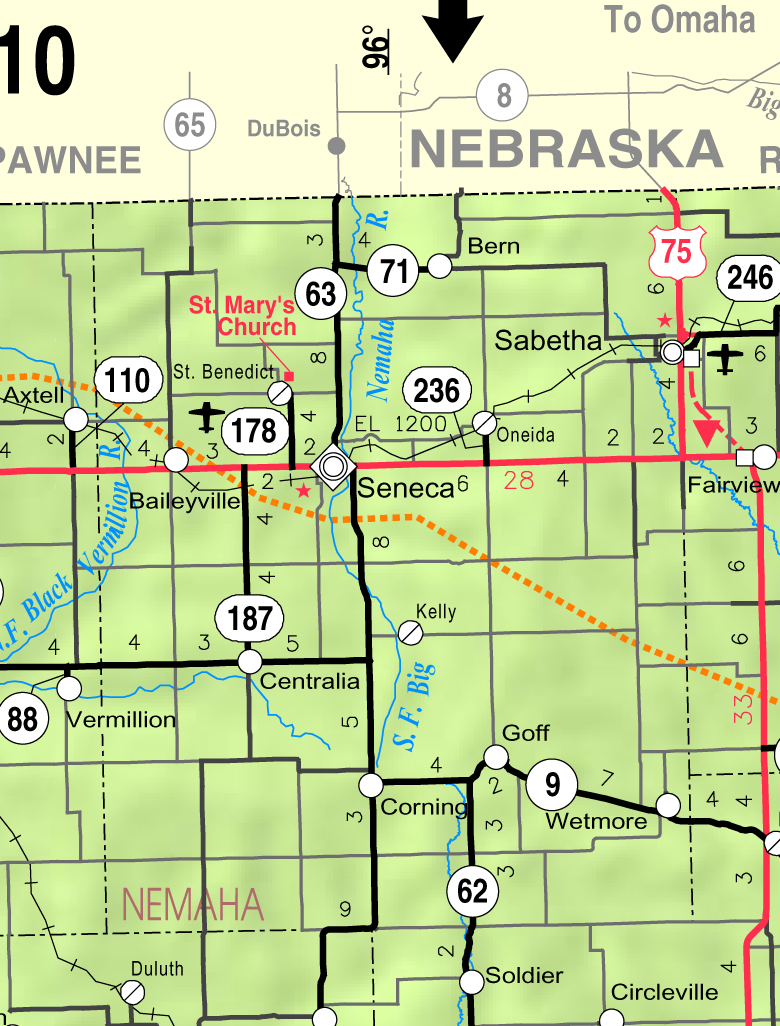
- KDOT map of Nemaha County (legend)
- Coordinates: 39°54′46″N 95°47′29″W
- Country: United States
- State: Kansas
- Counties: Brown, Nemaha
- Founded: 1854
- Incorporated: 1874
- Named for: Sabbath

Area
  - Total: 3.20 sq mi (8.30 km^{2})
  - Land: 3.19 sq mi (8.26 km^{2})
  - Water: 0.012 sq mi (0.03 km^{2})
- Elevation: 1,273 ft (388 m)

Population (2020)
  - Total: 2,545
  - Density: 798/sq mi (308/km^{2})
- Time zone: UTC−6 (CST)
  - Summer (DST): UTC−5 (CDT)
- ZIP Code: 66534
- Area code: 785
- FIPS code: 20-62025
- GNIS ID: 485648
- Website: cityofsabetha.com

Sabetha (/ˈsæbɪθə/ SA-bi-thə) is a city in Brown and Nemaha counties in the U.S. state of Kansas. As of the 2020 census, its population was 2,545.

== History ==
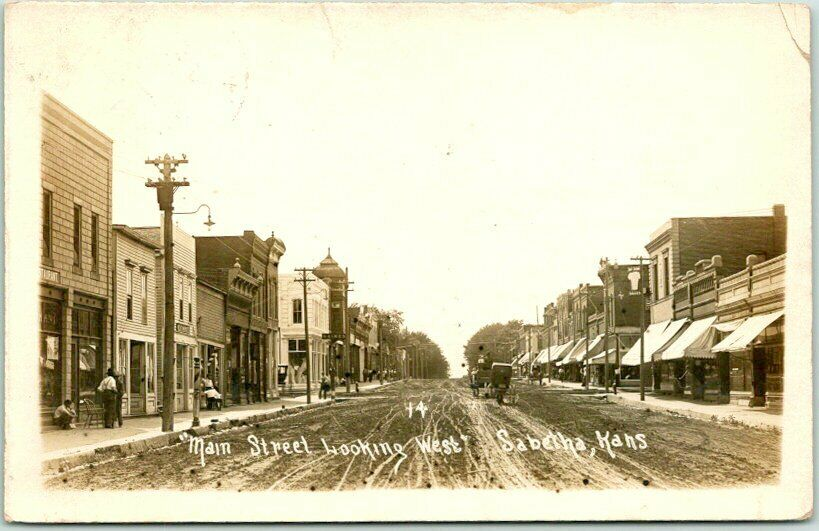
Sabetha as seen in 1913

The town's settlement began c. 1854, with a name reportedly derived from the word "Sabbath", the day the first settler arrived. Sabetha was incorporated as a city in 1874.

On the evening of June 13, 1998, an F2 tornado damaged much of the downtown, but no casualties were reported. The downtown area received little warning, as the tornado struck less than 1 minute after the tornado siren began to sound. The tornado, which touched down half a mile west of the Sabetha City Hall, caused serious damage to two blocks of the town, with 18 buildings in the downtown area being damaged, five (including the city hall building) to near "the point of loss". The tornado lifted about half a mile east of City Hall. Damage to the city hall building amounted to $2 million, and additional damage to homes and vehicles away from downtown occurred due to tornado-toppled trees and branches away from the tornado's center along with strong, straight-line winds.

== Geography ==
According to the United States Census Bureau, the city has a total area of 3.47 square miles (8.99 km^{2}), of which 0.01 sq mi (0.03 km^{2}) is covered by water.

== Demographics ==
Historical population
Census	Pop.	Note	%±
1880	849		—
1890	1,368		61.1%
1900	1,646		20.3%
1910	1,768		7.4%
1920	2,003		13.3%
1930	2,332		16.4%
1940	2,241		−3.9%
1950	2,173		−3.0%
1960	2,318		6.7%
1970	2,376		2.5%
1980	2,297		−3.3%
1990	2,341		1.9%
2000	2,589		10.6%
2010	2,571		−0.7%
2020	2,545		−1.0%
U.S. Decennial Census

=== 2020 census ===
As of the 2020 census, Sabetha had a population of 2,545. The median age was 40.1 years; 24.8% of residents were under 18 and 24.1% were 65 or older. For every 100 females, there were 99.6 males, and for every 100 females 18 and over, there were 93.1 males 18 and over.

None of the residents lived in urban areas, while 100.0% lived in rural areas.

Of the 1,045 households in Sabetha, 28.0% had children under 18 living in the, 47.6% were married-couple households, 21.1% were households with a male householder and no spouse or partner present, and 25.2% were households with a female householder and no spouse or partner present. About 36.5% of all households were made up of individuals, and 19.9% had someone living alone who was 65 or older.

The city had 1,168 housing units, of which 10.5% were vacant. The homeowner vacancy rate was 2.8% and the rental vacancy rate was 9.8%.

Racial composition as of the 2020 census
Race	Number	Percent
White	2,336	91.8%
Black or African American	38	1.5%
American Indian and Alaska Native	20	0.8%
Asian	31	1.2%
Native Hawaiian and other Pacific Islander	2	0.1%
Some other race	10	0.4%
Two or more races	108	4.2%
Hispanic or Latino (of any race)	61	2.4%

=== 2010 census ===
As of the census of 2010, 2,571 people, 1,090 households, and 645 families were living in the city. The population density was 743.1 inhabitants per square mile (286.9/km^{2}). There were 1,230 housing units at an average density of 355.5 per square mile (137.3/km^{2}). The racial makeup of the city was 96.6% White, 0.9% African American, 0.5% Native American, 0.1% Asian, 0.1% Pacific Islander, 0.5% from other races, and 1.3% from two or more races. Hispanics or Latinoss of any race were 1.0% of the population.

Of the 1,090 households, 27.4% had children under 18 living with them, 49.4% were married couples living together, 6.6% had a female householder with no husband present, 3.1% had a male householder with no wife present, and 40.8% were not families. Of all households, 37.2% were made up of individuals, and 20.5% had someone living alone who was 65 or older. The average household size was 2.24, and the average family size was 2.97.

The median age in the city was 42.8 years; the age distribution was 25% under 18, 5.4% from 18 to 24, 22.3% from 25 to 44, 23.1% from 45 to 64; and 24.2% were 65 or older. The gender makeup of the city was 47.5% male and 52.5% female.

== Education ==
The community is served by Prairie Hills USD 113 public school district, a public school district formed in 2010 by the merger of Sabetha USD 441 and Axtell USD 488.

== Notable people ==
- Wilbur Bestwick (1911–1972), the first sergeant major of the United States Marine Corps
- Arthur Schabinger (1889–1972), basketball coach and administrator, member of the Basketball Hall of Fame
- Krishna Shenoy, neuroscientist and neuroengineer who was a professor at Stanford University
