= Goff, Kansas =

City in Nemaha County, Kansas

- City
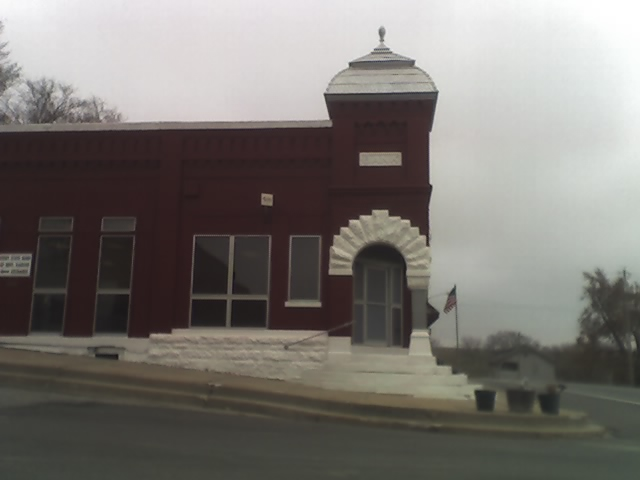
- Goff National Bank (2008)

- Location within Nemaha County and Kansas

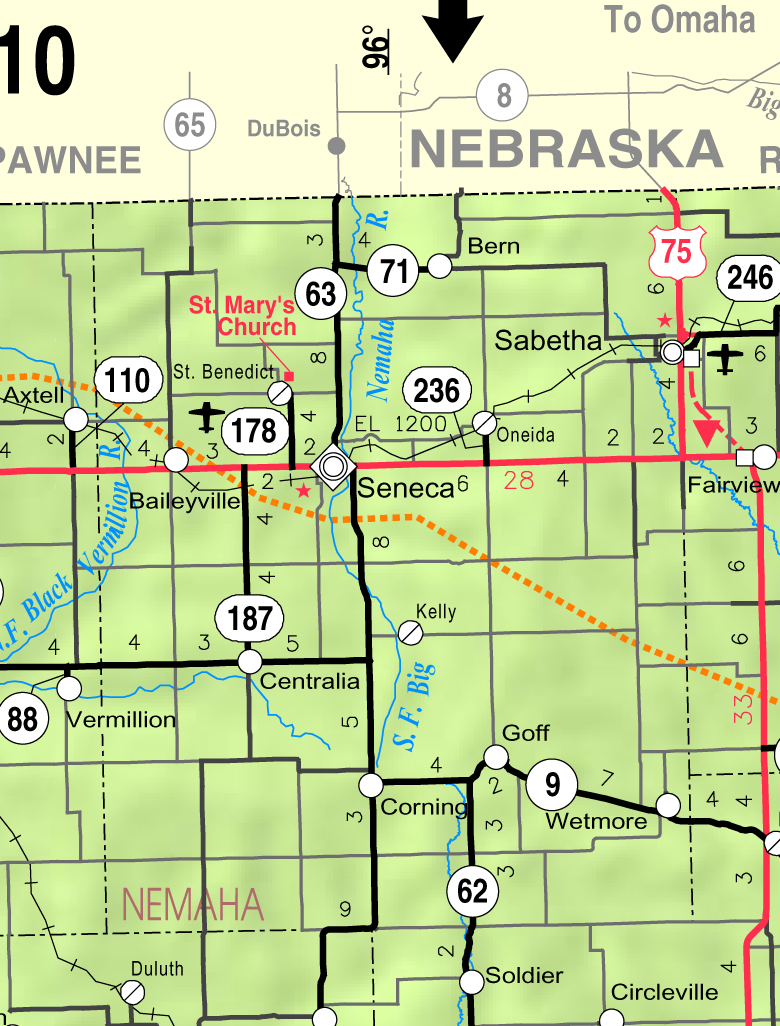
- KDOT map of Nemaha County (legend)
- Coordinates: 39°39′51″N 95°55′54″W
- Country: United States
- State: Kansas
- County: Nemaha
- Founded: 1880
- Incorporated: 1887
- Named for: Edward Goff

Area
  - Total: 0.20 sq mi (0.53 km^{2})
  - Land: 0.20 sq mi (0.53 km^{2})
  - Water: 0 sq mi (0.00 km^{2})
- Elevation: 1,234 ft (376 m)

Population (2020)
  - Total: 106
  - Density: 520/sq mi (200/km^{2})
- Time zone: UTC-6 (CST)
  - Summer (DST): UTC-5 (CDT)
- ZIP Code: 66428
- Area code: 785
- FIPS code: 20-26775
- GNIS ID: 2394921

Goff is a city in Nemaha County, Kansas, United States. As of the 2020 census, the population of the city was 106.

== History ==
Goff got its start in the year 1880, following construction of the railroad through that territory. It was named for Edward H. Goff, aCentral Branch Union Pacific Railroad official.

The post office's name was officially spelled Goff's from 1880 until 1894.

== Geography ==
According to the United States Census Bureau, the city has a total area of 0.21 square miles (0.54 km^{2}), all land.

== Demographics ==
Historical population
Census	Pop.	Note	%±
1880	29		—
1900	365		—
1910	422		15.6%
1920	398		−5.7%
1930	437		9.8%
1940	339		−22.4%
1950	315		−7.1%
1960	259		−17.8%
1970	207		−20.1%
1980	196		−5.3%
1990	156		−20.4%
2000	181		16.0%
2010	126		−30.4%
2020	106		−15.9%
U.S. Decennial Census

=== 2020 census ===
The 2020 United States census counted 106 people, 36 households, and 19 families in Goff. The population density was 514.6 per square mile (198.7/km^{2}). There were 52 housing units at an average density of 252.4 per square mile (97.5/km^{2}). The racial makeup was 90.57% (96) white or European American (90.57% non-Hispanic white), 0.0% (0) black or African-American, 0.0% (0) Native American or Alaska Native, 0.0% (0) Asian, 0.94% (1) Pacific Islander or Native Hawaiian, 0.0% (0) from other races, and 8.49% (9) from two or more races. Hispanic or Latino of any race was 2.83% (3) of the population.

Of the 36 households, 30.6% had children under 18; 36.1% were married couples living together; 25.0% had a female householder with no spouse or partner present. 44.4% of households consisted of individuals, and 16.7% had someone living alone who was 65 or older. The average household size was 2.0, and the average family size was 2.4. The percentage of those with a bachelor's degree or higher was estimated to be 13.2%.

33.0% of the population was under 18, 10.4% from 18 to 24, 27.4% from 25 to 44, 14.2% from 45 to 64, and 15.1% who were 65 years of age or older. The median age was 28.3 years. For every 100 females, there were 79.7 males. For every 100 females ages 18 and older, there were 77.5 males.

The 2016–2020 5-year American Community Survey estimates show that the median household income was $51,875 (with a margin of error of +/- $32,088) and the median family income was $51,875 (+/- $39,092). Males had a median income of $47,917 (+/- $36,336). The median income for those above 16 was $25,750 (+/- $10,077). Approximately 27.6% of families and 28.6% of the population were below the poverty line, including 48.0% of those under the age of 18 and 0.0% of those aged 65 or over.

=== 2010 census ===
As of the census of 2010, there were 126 people, 49 households, and 34 families residing in the city. The population density was 600.0 inhabitants per square mile (231.7/km^{2}). There were 62 housing units at an average density of 295.2 per square mile (114.0/km^{2}). The city's racial makeup was 90.5% White, 1.6% Native American, 0.8% Asian, and 7.1% from two or more races. Hispanic or Latino of any race were 0.8% of the population.

There were 49 households, of which 40.8% had children under the age of 18 living with them, 46.9% were married couples living together, 12.2% had a female householder with no husband present, 10.2% had a male householder with no wife present, and 30.6% were non-families. 22.4% of all households consisted of individuals, and 6.1% had someone living alone who was 65 or older. The average household size was 2.57 and the average family size was 3.09.

The median age in the city was 33.3 years. 34.1% of residents were under 18; 3.9% were between the ages of 18 and 24; 23.1% were from 25 to 44; 23.9% were from 45 to 64; and 15.1% were 65 years of age or older. The gender makeup of the city was 57.1% male and 42.9% female.

=== 2000 census ===
As of the census of 2000, there were 181 people, 60 households, and 43 families residing in the city. The population density was 855.4 inhabitants per square mile (330.3/km^{2}). There were 72 housing units at an average density of 340.3 per square mile (131.4/km^{2}). The racial makeup of the city was 91.16% White, 1.66% African American, 2.21% Native American, 0.55% Asian, and 4.42% from two or more races. Hispanic or Latino of any race were 2.76% of the population.

There were 60 households, out of which 43.3% had children under the age of 18 living with them, 55.0% were married couples living together, 15.0% had a female householder with no husband present, and 26.7% were non-families. 25.0% of all households were made up of individuals, and 13.3% had someone living alone who was 65 years of age or older. The average household size was 3.02 and the average family size was 3.66.

In the city, the population was spread out, with 38.1% under the age of 18, 9.9% from 18 to 24, 24.9% from 25 to 44, 14.9% from 45 to 64, and 12.2% who were 65 years of age or older. The median age was 26 years. For every 100 females, there were 108.0 males. For every 100 females age 18 and over, there were 96.5 males.

The median income for a household in the city was $35,781, and the median income for a family was $36,667. Males had a median income of $27,500 versus $18,542 for females. The per capita income for the city was $13,028. None of the population or families were below the poverty line.

== Education ==
The community is served by Prairie Hills USD 113 public school district.
