= Rock Creek Township, Butler County, Kansas =

Rock Creek Township Butler County, Kansas
- Township
- Location within Butler County

- Location within Kansas
- Coordinates: 37°31′30″N 096°54′11″W
- Country: United States
- State: Kansas
- County: Butler

Area
  - Total: 36.12 sq mi (93.56 km^{2})
  - Land: 36.12 sq mi (93.56 km^{2})
  - Water: 0 sq mi (0 km^{2}) 0%
- Elevation: 1,322 ft (403 m)

Population (2000)
  - Total: 299
  - Density: 8.28/sq mi (3.20/km^{2})
- Time zone: UTC-6 (CST)
  - Summer (DST): UTC-5 (CDT)
- FIPS code: 20-60475
- GNIS ID: 470022
- Website: County website

Rock Creek Township is a township in Butler County, Kansas, United States. As of the 2000 census, its population was 299.

== History ==
Rock Creek Township was created in 1872.

== Geography ==
Rock Creek Township covers an area of 36.12 square miles (93.6 km^{2}) and contains no incorporated settlements. According to the USGS, it contains one cemetery, McCabe.

The streams of Chigger Creek and Swisher Branch run through this township.
