= Walnut Township, Brown County, Kansas =

Walnut Township
- Township
- Location in Brown County
- Coordinates: 39°50′38″N 095°41′16″W
- Country: United States
- State: Kansas
- County: Brown

Area
  - Total: 62.49 sq mi (161.86 km^{2})
  - Land: 62.21 sq mi (161.12 km^{2})
  - Water: 0.29 sq mi (0.74 km^{2}) 0.46%
- Elevation: 1,109 ft (338 m)

Population (2000)
  - Total: 665
  - Density: 11/sq mi (4.1/km^{2})
- GNIS feature ID: 0472753

Walnut Township is a township in Brown County, Kansas, United States. As of the 2000 census, its population was 665.

== History ==
Walnut Township was formed in 1872.

== Geography ==
Walnut Township covers an area of 62.49 square miles (161.8 km^{2}) and contains one incorporated settlement, Fairview. According to the USGS, it contains six cemeteries: Congregational, Fairview, Isley, Lambertson, Saint Paul and Shelton.

The streams of Mulberry Creek, Noharts Creek and Spring Creek run through this township.
