= Baileyville, Kansas =

Unincorporated community in Nemaha County, Kansas

- CDP
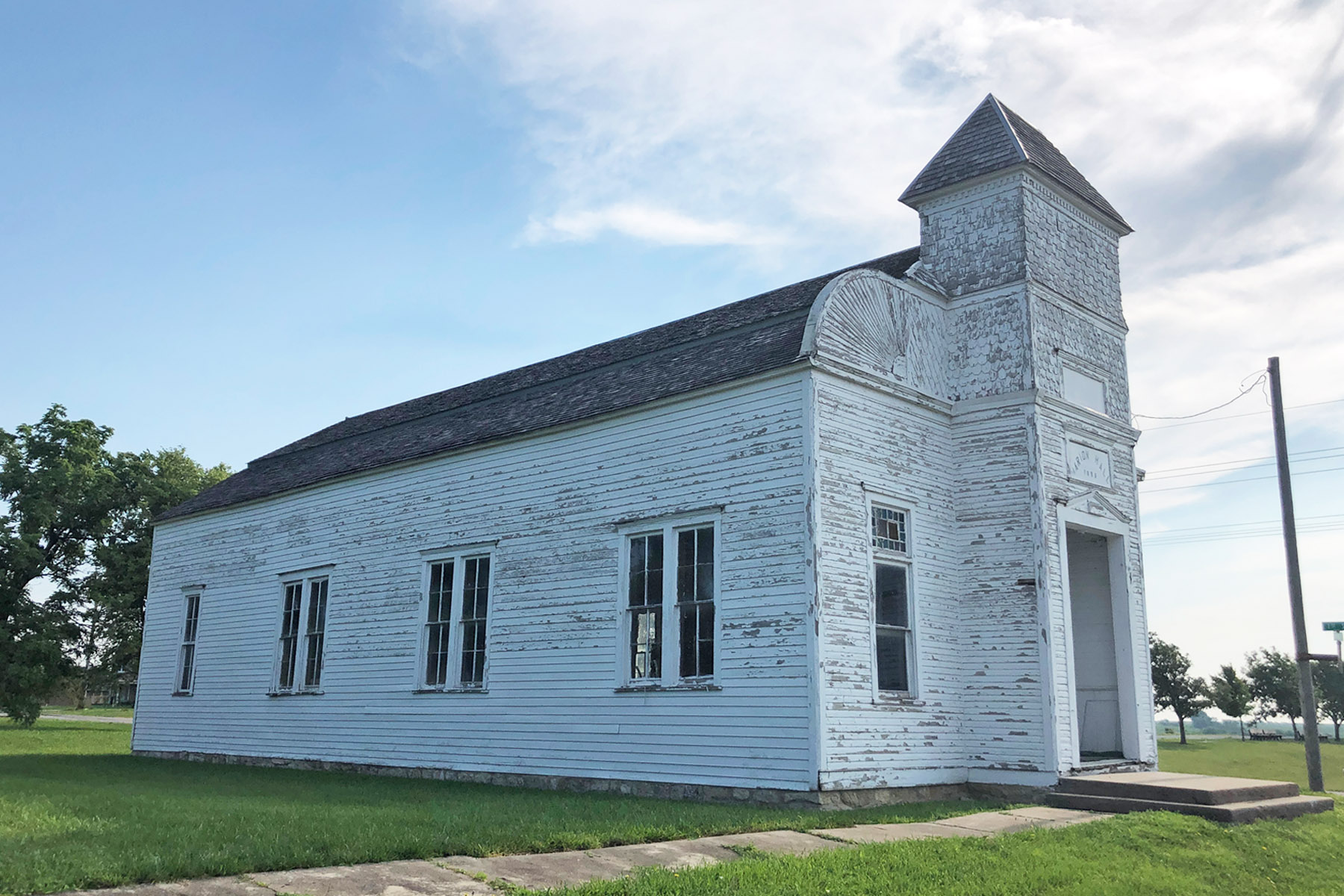
- Historical Marion Hall in Baileyville (2021)

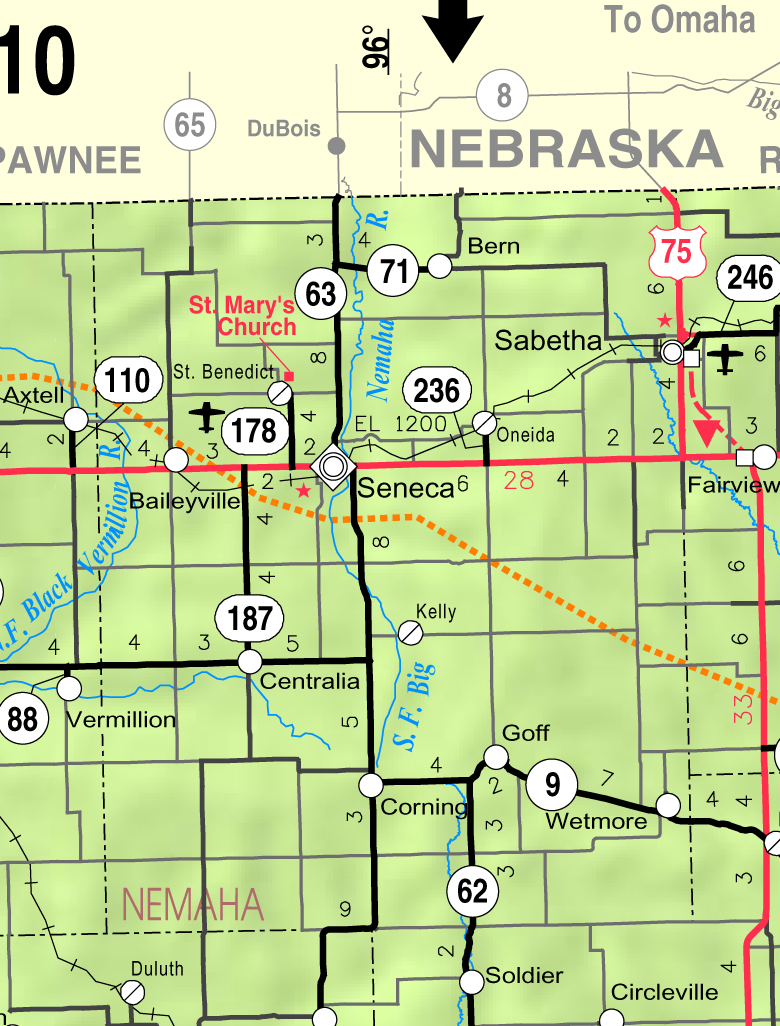
- KDOT map of Nemaha County (legend)

- Location within Kansas Location within the United States
- Coordinates: 39°50′55″N 96°11′25″W
- Country: United States
- State: Kansas
- County: Nemaha
- Named for: Willis J. Bailey
- Elevation: 1,309 ft (399 m)

Population (2020)
  - Total: 182
- Time zone: UTC-6 (CST)
  - Summer (DST): UTC-5 (CDT)
- Area code: 785
- FIPS code: 20-03675
- GNIS ID: 2629152

Baileyville is a census-designated place (CDP) in western Nemaha County, Kansas, United States. As of the 2020 census, the population was 182. It is located six miles west of Seneca on U.S. Route 36.

== History ==
The community was founded as Haytown, then renamed by Willis J. Bailey and his father to Baileyville. In 1903, Willis became the 16th Governor of Kansas. The first post office in Baileyville was established in 1880.

== Demographics ==
Historical population
Census	Pop.	Note	%±
2020	182		—
U.S. Decennial Census

The 2020 United States census counted 182 people, 79 households, and 55 families in Baileyville. The population density was 150.4 per square mile (58.1/km^{2}). There were 83 housing units at an average density of 68.6 per square mile (26.5/km^{2}). The racial makeup was 98.9% (180) white or European American (98.9% non-Hispanic white), 0.0% (0) black or African-American, 0.0% (0) Native American or Alaska Native, 0.0% (0) Asian, 0.0% (0) Pacific Islander or Native Hawaiian, 1.1% (2) from other races, and 0.0% (0) from two or more races. Hispanic or Latino of any race was 1.1% (2) of the population.

Of the 79 households, 22.8% had children under the age of 18; 62.0% were married couples living together; 17.7% had a female householder with no spouse or partner present. 29.1% of households consisted of individuals and 15.2% had someone living alone who was 65 years of age or older. The average household size was 2.5 and the average family size was 1.9. The percent of those with a bachelor's degree or higher was estimated to be 0.0% of the population.

25.3% of the population was under the age of 18, 3.8% from 18 to 24, 16.5% from 25 to 44, 28.0% from 45 to 64, and 26.4% who were 65 years of age or older. The median age was 53.0 years. For every 100 females, there were 83.8 males. For every 100 females ages 18 and older, there were 100.0 males.

The 2016–2020 5-year American Community Survey estimates show that the median household income was $52,700 (with a margin of error of +/- $28,533) and the median family income was $52,950 (+/- $38,982).

== Education ==
=== Primary and secondary ===
The community is served by Nemaha Central USD 115 public school district. Nemaha Central High School is located in Seneca with the mascot Thunder.

B&B High school closed in 2014 through school unification. The B&B High School mascot was Falcons.

=== Colleges and universities ===
Highland Community College opened in Baileyville in June 2014.

== Transportation ==
The community is served by the Union Pacific Railroad and US Highway 36.

== See also ==
- List of sundown towns in the United States
