= Centralia, Kansas =

City in Nemaha County, Kansas, US

- City
- Location within Nemaha County and Kansas

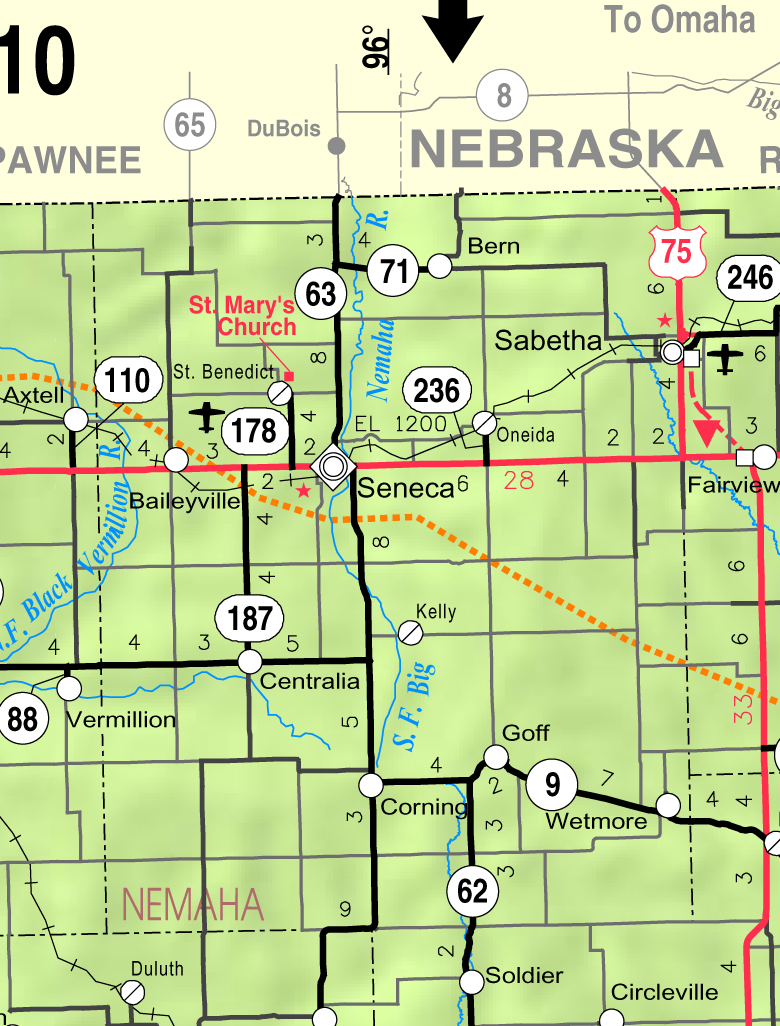
- KDOT map of Nemaha County (legend)
- Coordinates: 39°43′28″N 96°07′48″W
- Country: United States
- State: Kansas
- County: Nemaha
- Founded: 1859
- Incorporated: 1882

Area
  - Total: 0.45 sq mi (1.17 km^{2})
  - Land: 0.45 sq mi (1.17 km^{2})
  - Water: 0 sq mi (0.00 km^{2})
- Elevation: 1,296 ft (395 m)

Population (2020)
  - Total: 485
  - Density: 1,070/sq mi (415/km^{2})
- Time zone: UTC-6 (CST)
  - Summer (DST): UTC-5 (CDT)
- ZIP Code: 66415
- Area code: 785
- FIPS code: 20-12425
- GNIS ID: 2393790
- Website: cityofcentraliaks.org

Centralia is a city in Nemaha County, Kansas, United States. As of the 2020 census, the population of the city was 485.

== History ==
Centralia was founded in 1859, one mile north of the present town. When a railroad was built through the territory in 1867, Centralia was moved to the site. Centralia was incorporated in 1882. One of the early residents of Centralia was Floyd Perry Baker, a Kansas politician and newspaper editor, who moved there with his family from Andrew County, Missouri circa 1860.

In 1901, Centralia was the scene of violent conflicts between whites and African Americans. By this time, Centralia had a sundown town policy forbidding blacks from living in the area.

== Geography ==
According to the United States Census Bureau, the city has a total area of 0.47 square miles (1.22 km^{2}), all land.

=== Climate ===
This climatic region is typified by large seasonal temperature differences, with warm to hot (and often humid) summers and cold (sometimes severely cold) winters. According to the Köppen Climate Classification system, Centralia has a humid continental climate, abbreviated "Dfa" on climate maps.

Climate data for Centralia, Kansas (1991–2020)
Month	Jan	Feb	Mar	Apr	May	Jun	Jul	Aug	Sep	Oct	Nov	Dec	Year
Mean daily maximum °F (°C)	37.8 (3.2)	43.1 (6.2)	54.6 (12.6)	65.6 (18.7)	75.0 (23.9)	84.2 (29.0)	89.1 (31.7)	87.2 (30.7)	79.9 (26.6)	68.0 (20.0)	53.2 (11.8)	40.9 (4.9)	64.9 (18.3)
Daily mean °F (°C)	27.4 (−2.6)	31.9 (−0.1)	42.5 (5.8)	53.4 (11.9)	64.2 (17.9)	73.8 (23.2)	78.2 (25.7)	75.9 (24.4)	68.0 (20.0)	55.9 (13.3)	42.2 (5.7)	31.4 (−0.3)	53.7 (12.1)
Mean daily minimum °F (°C)	17.1 (−8.3)	20.7 (−6.3)	30.4 (−0.9)	41.2 (5.1)	53.4 (11.9)	63.4 (17.4)	67.2 (19.6)	64.6 (18.1)	56.1 (13.4)	43.8 (6.6)	31.1 (−0.5)	21.9 (−5.6)	42.6 (5.9)
Average precipitation inches (mm)	0.84 (21)	1.14 (29)	2.13 (54)	3.34 (85)	5.08 (129)	4.62 (117)	5.50 (140)	4.30 (109)	3.77 (96)	2.44 (62)	1.52 (39)	1.23 (31)	35.91 (912)
Average snowfall inches (cm)	9.5 (24)	6.8 (17)	5.2 (13)	1.7 (4.3)	0.1 (0.25)	0.0 (0.0)	0.0 (0.0)	0.0 (0.0)	0.0 (0.0)	0.8 (2.0)	3.6 (9.1)	5.7 (14)	33.4 (83.65)
Source: NOAA

== Demographics ==
Historical population
Census	Pop.	Note	%±
1880	289		—
1890	534		84.8%
1900	655		22.7%
1910	665		1.5%
1920	619		−6.9%
1930	682		10.2%
1940	607		−11.0%
1950	574		−5.4%
1960	527		−8.2%
1970	511		−3.0%
1980	486		−4.9%
1990	452		−7.0%
2000	534		18.1%
2010	512		−4.1%
2020	485		−5.3%
U.S. Decennial Census

=== 2020 census ===
The 2020 United States census counted 485 people, 193 households, and 122 families in Centralia. The population density was 1,068.3 per square mile (412.5/km^{2}). There were 221 housing units at an average density of 486.8 per square mile (187.9/km^{2}). The racial makeup was 92.16% (447) white or European American (90.52% non-Hispanic white), 0.0% (0) black or African-American, 0.82% (4) Native American or Alaska Native, 0.0% (0) Asian, 0.0% (0) Pacific Islander or Native Hawaiian, 0.82% (4) from other races, and 6.19% (30) from two or more races. Hispanic or Latino of any race was 4.33% (21) of the population.

Of the 193 households, 31.6% had children under the age of 18; 50.8% were married couples living together; 20.2% had a female householder with no spouse or partner present. 33.7% of households consisted of individuals and 15.5% had someone living alone who was 65 years of age or older. The average household size was 2.3 and the average family size was 2.6. The percent of those with a bachelor's degree or higher was estimated to be 36.1% of the population.

24.9% of the population was under the age of 18, 8.0% from 18 to 24, 24.7% from 25 to 44, 22.1% from 45 to 64, and 20.2% who were 65 years of age or older. The median age was 37.7 years. For every 100 females, there were 105.5 males. For every 100 females ages 18 and older, there were 108.0 males.

The 2016–2020 5-year American Community Survey estimates show that the median household income was $68,750 (with a margin of error of +/- $21,394) and the median family income was $76,786 (+/- $32,008). Males had a median income of $24,792 (+/- $17,172) versus $26,818 (+/- $6,844) for females. The median income for those above 16 years old was $26,250 (+/- $7,915). Approximately, 4.9% of families and 8.9% of the population were below the poverty line, including 12.1% of those under the age of 18 and 4.5% of those ages 65 or over.

=== 2010 census ===
As of the census of 2010, there were 512 people, 201 households, and 123 families residing in the city. The population density was 1,089.4 inhabitants per square mile (420.6/km^{2}). There were 238 housing units at an average density of 506.4 per square mile (195.5/km^{2}). The racial makeup of the city was 94.5% White, 1.2% African American, 0.8% Native American, 0.8% Asian, 0.6% from other races, and 2.1% from two or more races. Hispanic or Latino of any race were 2.5% of the population.

There were 201 households, of which 30.8% had children under the age of 18 living with them, 48.8% were married couples living together, 8.5% had a female householder with no husband present, 4.0% had a male householder with no wife present, and 38.8% were non-families. 35.3% of all households were made up of individuals, and 19.9% had someone living alone who was 65 years of age or older. The average household size was 2.38 and the average family size was 3.02.

The median age in the city was 40.1 years. 25% of residents were under the age of 18; 5.7% were between the ages of 18 and 24; 25.4% were from 25 to 44; 22.8% were from 45 to 64; and 21.1% were 65 years of age or older. The gender makeup of the city was 50.6% male and 49.4% female.

=== 2000 census ===
As of the census of 2000, there were 534 people, 216 households, and 127 families residing in the city. The population density was 1,186.0 inhabitants per square mile (457.9/km^{2}). There were 235 housing units at an average density of 521.9 per square mile (201.5/km^{2}). The racial makeup of the city was 96.82% White, 0.19% African American, 0.94% Native American, 0.37% Pacific Islander, 0.19% from other races, and 1.50% from two or more races. Hispanic or Latino of any race were 2.81% of the population.

There were 216 households, out of which 27.3% had children under the age of 18 living with them, 54.6% were married couples living together, 3.7% had a female householder with no husband present, and 41.2% were non-families. 38.9% of all households were made up of individuals, and 28.7% had someone living alone who was 65 years of age or older. The average household size was 2.29 and the average family size was 3.13.

In the city, the population was spread out, with 25.7% under the age of 18, 5.1% from 18 to 24, 21.7% from 25 to 44, 17.2% from 45 to 64, and 30.3% who were 65 years of age or older. The median age was 44 years. For every 100 females, there were 87.4 males. For every 100 females age 18 and over, there were 83.8 males.

The median income for a household in the city was $22,240, and the median income for a family was $32,625. Males had a median income of $22,500 versus $16,591 for females. The per capita income for the city was $14,813. About 8.0% of families and 14.5% of the population were below the poverty line, including 19.3% of those under age 18 and 16.6% of those age 65 or over.

== Education ==
The community and nearby rural areas are served by Vermillion USD 380 public school district.

== Notable people ==
- Floyd Baker, Kansas politician, lawyer, newspaper editor
- John Riggins, NFL running back

== See also ==
- Central Branch Union Pacific Railroad
- List of sundown towns in the United States
