= Corning, Kansas =

City in Nemaha County, Kansas

- City
- Location within Nemaha County and Kansas

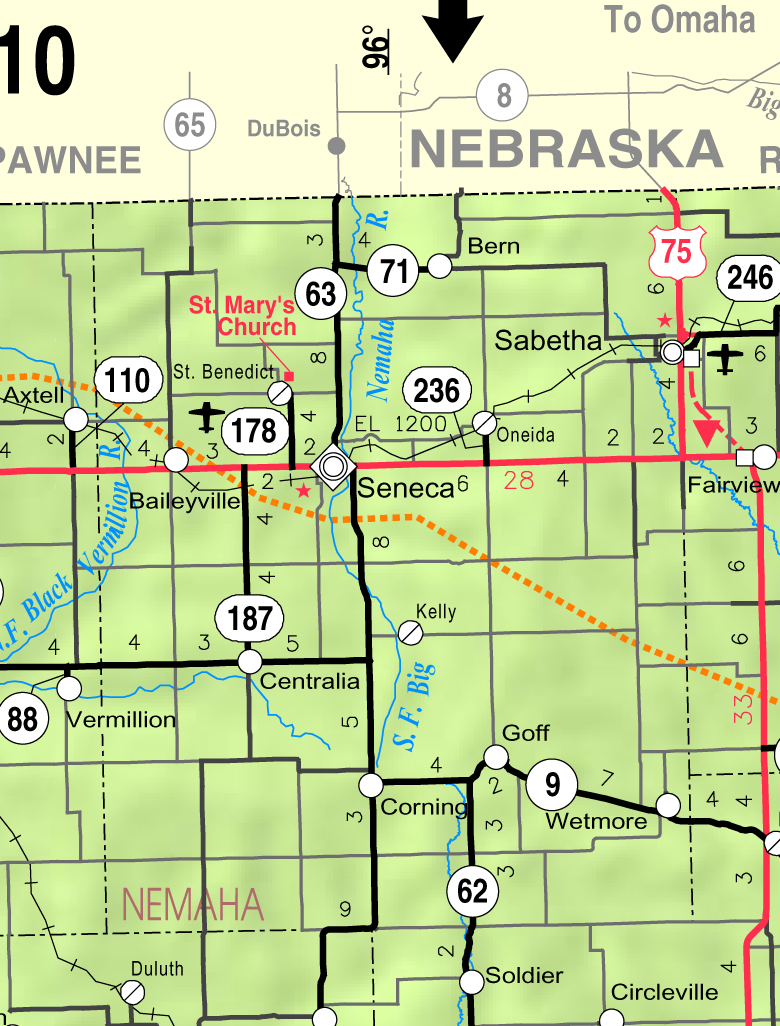
- KDOT map of Nemaha County (legend)
- Coordinates: 39°39′26″N 96°01′44″W
- Country: United States
- State: Kansas
- County: Nemaha
- Incorporated: 1889

Area
  - Total: 0.27 sq mi (0.71 km^{2})
  - Land: 0.27 sq mi (0.71 km^{2})
  - Water: 0 sq mi (0.00 km^{2})
- Elevation: 1,345 ft (410 m)

Population (2020)
  - Total: 212
  - Density: 770/sq mi (300/km^{2})
- Time zone: UTC-6 (CST)
  - Summer (DST): UTC-5 (CDT)
- ZIP Code: 66417
- Area code: 785
- FIPS code: 20-15725
- GNIS ID: 2393637

Corning is a city in Nemaha County, Kansas, United States. As of the 2020 census, the population of the city was 212.

== History ==
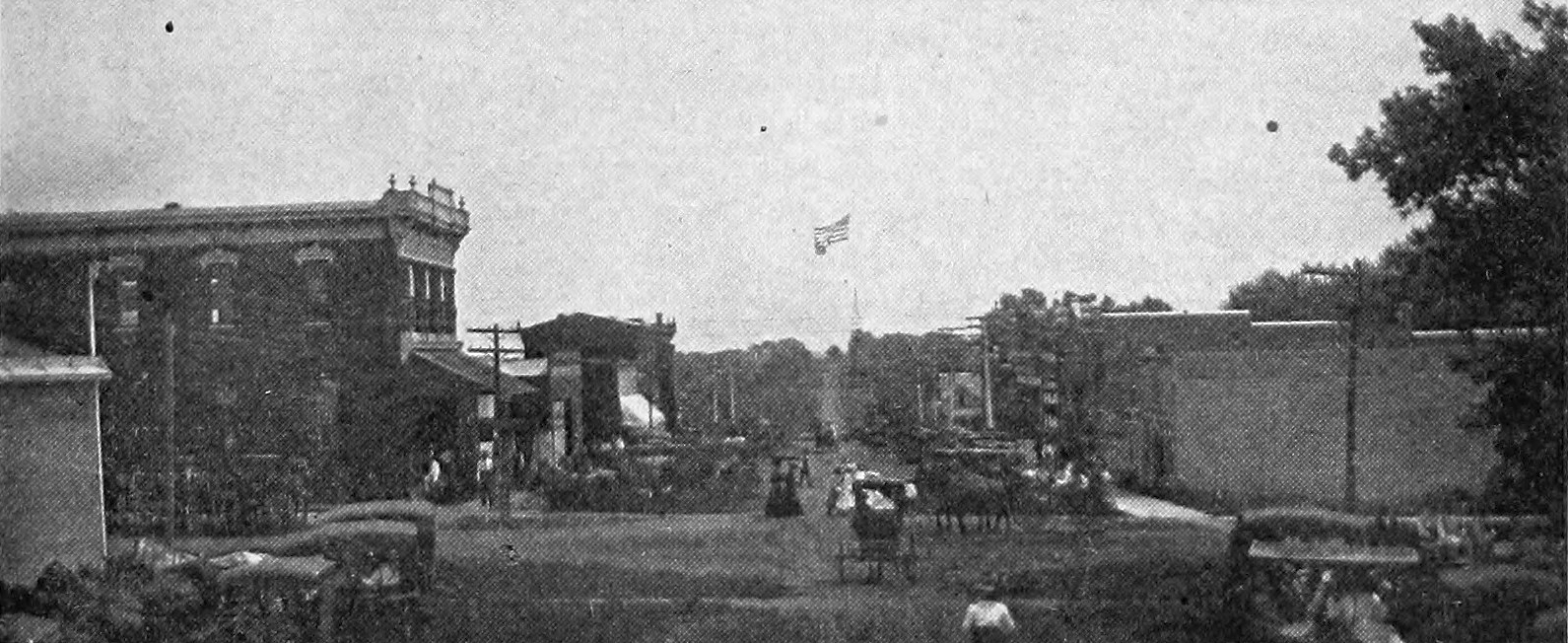
Corning (1916)

Corning was founded in 1857 a mile and a half distant from the present town. In 1867, Corning was moved to the site it now occupies. It was named for Erastus Corning, of New York.

== Geography ==
According to the United States Census Bureau, the city has a total area of 0.27 square miles (0.70 km^{2}), all land.

== Demographics ==
Historical population
Census	Pop.	Note	%±
1880	63		—
1890	291		361.9%
1900	425		46.0%
1910	411		−3.3%
1920	419		1.9%
1930	340		−18.9%
1940	352		3.5%
1950	254		−27.8%
1960	240		−5.5%
1970	162		−32.5%
1980	158		−2.5%
1990	142		−10.1%
2000	170		19.7%
2010	157		−7.6%
2020	212		35.0%
U.S. Decennial Census

=== 2020 census ===
The 2020 United States census counted 212 people, 70 households, and 54 families in Corning. The population density was 697.4 per square mile (269.3/km^{2}). There were 71 housing units at an average density of 233.6 per square mile (90.2/km^{2}). The racial makeup was 97.64% (207) white or European American (97.64% non-Hispanic white), 0.0% (0) black or African-American, 0.0% (0) Native American or Alaska Native, 0.0% (0) Asian, 0.0% (0) Pacific Islander or Native Hawaiian, 0.0% (0) from other races, and 2.36% (5) from two or more races. Hispanic or Latino of any race was 0.0% (0) of the population.

Of the 70 households, 51.4% had children under the age of 18; 64.3% were married couples living together; 11.4% had a female householder with no spouse or partner present. 17.1% of households consisted of individuals and 8.6% had someone living alone who was 65 years of age or older. The average household size was 2.6 and the average family size was 3.3. The percent of those with a bachelor's degree or higher was estimated to be 12.3% of the population.

34.4% of the population was under the age of 18, 8.0% from 18 to 24, 27.8% from 25 to 44, 18.9% from 45 to 64, and 10.8% who were 65 years of age or older. The median age was 30.4 years. For every 100 females, there were 98.1 males. For every 100 females ages 18 and older, there were 95.8 males.

The 2016–2020 5-year American Community Survey estimates show that the median household income was $65,313 (with a margin of error of +/- $17,028) and the median family income was $76,250 (+/- $23,234). Males had a median income of $35,000 (+/- $5,856) versus $25,625 (+/- $14,035) for females. The median income for those above 16 years old was $30,781 (+/- $5,028). Approximately, 5.3% of families and 8.7% of the population were below the poverty line, including 16.7% of those under the age of 18 and 0.0% of those ages 65 or over.

=== 2010 census ===
As of the census of 2010, there were 157 people, 57 households, and 40 families residing in the city. The population density was 581.5 inhabitants per square mile (224.5/km^{2}). There were 67 housing units at an average density of 248.1 per square mile (95.8/km^{2}). The racial makeup of the city was 94.9% White, 2.5% Native American, 1.3% from other races, and 1.3% from two or more races. Hispanic or Latino of any race were 1.3% of the population.

There were 57 households, of which 42.1% had children under the age of 18 living with them, 59.6% were married couples living together, 7.0% had a female householder with no husband present, 3.5% had a male householder with no wife present, and 29.8% were non-families. 26.3% of all households were made up of individuals, and 10.5% had someone living alone who was 65 years of age or older. The average household size was 2.75 and the average family size was 3.43.

The median age in the city was 32.8 years. 33.1% of residents were under the age of 18; 4.5% were between the ages of 18 and 24; 30.5% were from 25 to 44; 23.6% were from 45 to 64; and 8.3% were 65 years of age or older. The gender makeup of the city was 51.6% male and 48.4% female.

=== 2000 census ===
As of the census of 2000, there were 170 people, 64 households, and 41 families residing in the city. The population density was 614.4 inhabitants per square mile (237.2/km^{2}). There were 70 housing units at an average density of 253.0 per square mile (97.7/km^{2}). The racial makeup of the city was 96.47% White, 1.76% Native American, 1.18% Pacific Islander, 0.59% from other races. Hispanic or Latino of any race were 0.59% of the population.

There were 64 households, out of which 46.9% had children under the age of 18 living with them, 51.6% were married couples living together, 10.9% had a female householder with no husband present, and 34.4% were non-families. 29.7% of all households were made up of individuals, and 15.6% had someone living alone who was 65 years of age or older. The average household size was 2.66 and the average family size was 3.40.

In the city, the population was spread out, with 35.9% under the age of 18, 10.0% from 18 to 24, 27.1% from 25 to 44, 15.9% from 45 to 64, and 11.2% who were 65 years of age or older. The median age was 28 years. For every 100 females, there were 91.0 males. For every 100 females age 18 and over, there were 87.9 males.

The median income for a household in the city was $27,250, and the median income for a family was $32,500. Males had a median income of $26,250 versus $17,083 for females. The per capita income for the city was $10,135. About 6.8% of families and 10.2% of the population were below the poverty line, including 4.8% of those under the age of eighteen and 15.4% of those 65 or over.

== Education ==
The community and nearby rural areas are served by Vermillion USD 380 public school district.

== See also ==
- Central Branch Union Pacific Railroad
