= Nemaha County, Kansas =

County in Kansas, United States

- County
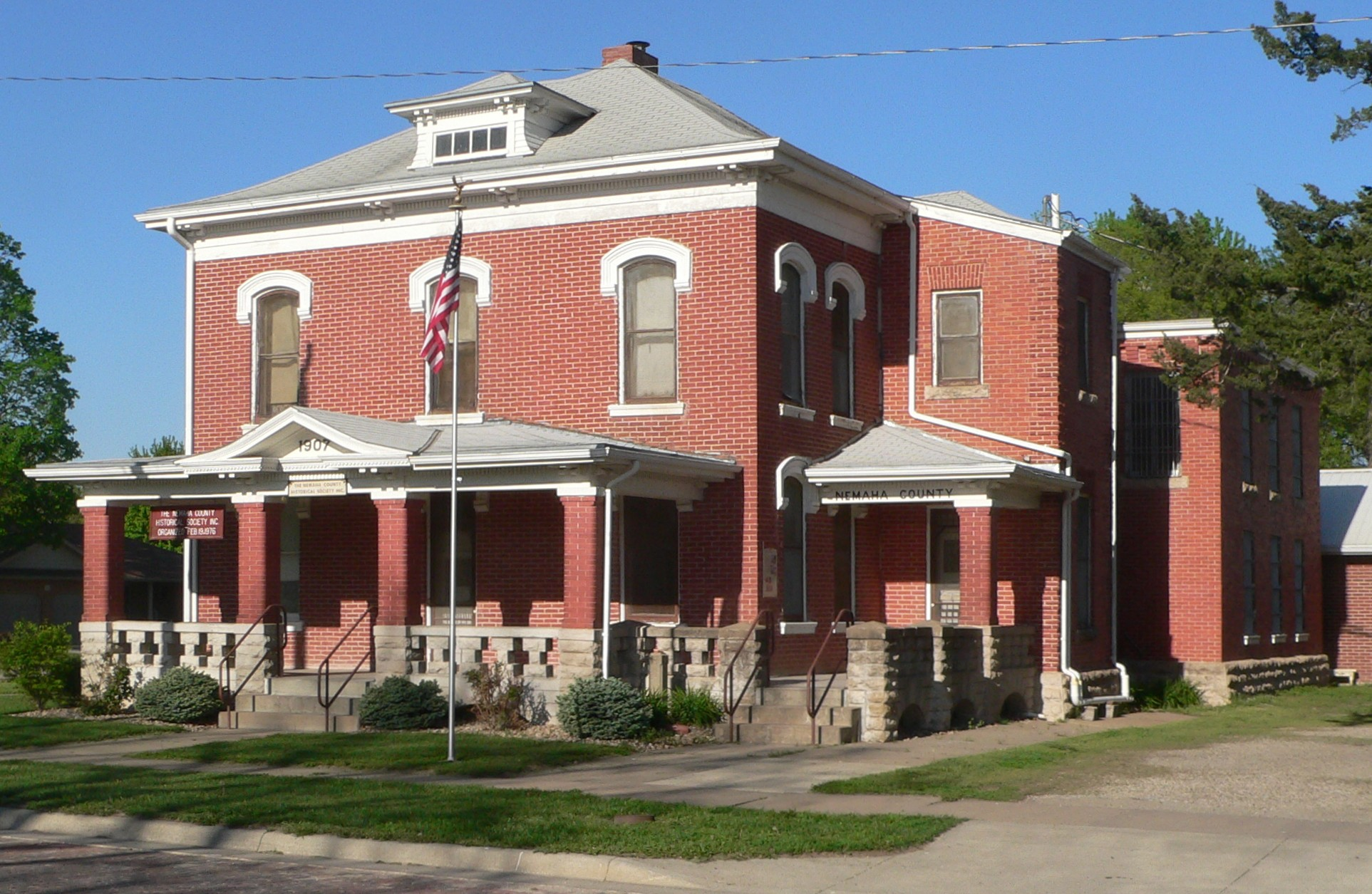
- Jail and sheriff residence in Seneca (2015)

- Location within the U.S. state of Kansas
- Coordinates: 39°48′N 96°01′W
- Country: United States
- State: Kansas
- Founded: August 25, 1855
- Named for: Nemaha River
- Seat: Seneca
- Largest city: Sabetha

Area
  - Total: 719 sq mi (1,860 km^{2})
  - Land: 717 sq mi (1,860 km^{2})
  - Water: 2.0 sq mi (5.2 km^{2}) 0.3%

Population (2020)
  - Total: 10,273
  - Estimate (2025): 10,054 ▼
  - Density: 14.3/sq mi (5.53/km^{2})
- Time zone: UTC−6 (Central)
  - Summer (DST): UTC−5 (CDT)
- Area code: 785
- Congressional district: 2nd
- Website: nmcoks.us

Nemaha County is a county located in the northeastern part of the U.S. state of Kansas. Its county seat is Seneca. As of the 2020 census, the county population was 10,273. The county was named for the Nemaha River.

== History ==
=== Early history ===
For many millennia the Great Plains of North America was inhabited by nomadic Native Americans. From the 16th century to 18th century, the Kingdom of France claimed ownership of large parts of North America. In 1762, after the French and Indian War, France secretly ceded New France to Spain, per the Treaty of Fontainebleau.

=== 19th century ===
In 1802, Spain returned most of the land to France, but keeping title to about 7,500 square miles. In 1803, most of the land for modern day Kansas was acquired by the United States from France as part of the 828,000 square mile Louisiana Purchase for 2.83 cents per acre.

In 1854, the Kansas Territory was organized, then in 1861 Kansas became the 34th U.S. state. In 1855, Nemaha County was established.

The first railroad in Nemaha County was built in 1866.

On May 30, 1879, the "Irving, Kansas Tornado" passed through Nemaha county. This tornado measured F4 on the Fujita scale, and had a damage path 800 yards (730 m) wide and 100 miles (160 km) long. Eighteen people were killed and sixty were injured in this tornado.

== Geography ==
According to the U.S. Census Bureau, the county has a total area of 719 square miles (1,860 km^{2}), of which 717 square miles (1,860 km^{2}) is land and 2.0 square miles (5.2 km^{2}) (0.3%) is water.

=== Adjacent counties ===
- Richardson County, Nebraska (northeast)
- Brown County (east)
- Jackson County (southeast)
- Pottawatomie County (southwest)
- Marshall County (west)
- Pawnee County, Nebraska (northwest)

== Demographics ==
Historical population
Census	Pop.	Note	%±
1860	2,436		—
1870	7,339		201.3%
1880	12,462		69.8%
1890	19,249		54.5%
1900	20,376		5.9%
1910	19,072		−6.4%
1920	18,487		−3.1%
1930	18,342		−0.8%
1940	16,761		−8.6%
1950	14,341		−14.4%
1960	12,897		−10.1%
1970	11,825		−8.3%
1980	11,211		−5.2%
1990	10,446		−6.8%
2000	10,717		2.6%
2010	10,178		−5.0%
2020	10,273		0.9%
2025 (est.)	10,054	▼	−2.1%
U.S. Decennial Census; 1790–1960 1900–1990; 1990–2000 2010–2020

=== Racial and ethnic composition ===
Nemaha County, Kansas – Racial and ethnic composition Note: the US Census treats Hispanic/Latino as an ethnic category. This table excludes Latinos from the racial categories and assigns them to a separate category. Hispanics/Latinos may be of any race.
Race / Ethnicity (NH = Non-Hispanic)	Pop 1980	Pop 1990	Pop 2000	Pop 2010	Pop 2020	% 1980	% 1990	% 2000	% 2010	% 2020
White alone (NH)	11,101	10,365	10,492	9,843	9,622	99.02%	99.22%	97.90%	96.71%	93.66%
Black or African American alone (NH)	33	37	51	51	64	0.29%	0.35%	0.48%	0.50%	0.62%
Native American or Alaska Native alone (NH)	16	13	24	42	26	0.14%	0.12%	0.22%	0.41%	0.25%
Asian alone (NH)	23	16	11	15	35	0.21%	0.15%	0.10%	0.15%	0.34%
Native Hawaiian or Pacific Islander alone (NH)	x	x	6	4	7	x	x	0.06%	0.04%	0.07%
Other race alone (NH)	5	1	0	4	10	0.04%	0.01%	0.00%	0.04%	0.10%
Mixed race or Multiracial (NH)	x	x	57	98	243	x	x	0.53%	0.96%	2.37%
Hispanic or Latino (any race)	33	14	76	121	266	0.29%	0.13%	0.71%	1.19%	2.59%
Total	11,211	10,446	10,717	10,178	10,273	100.00%	100.00%	100.00%	100.00%	100.00%

=== 2020 census ===
As of the 2020 census, the county had a population of 10,273. The median age was 40.4 years. 26.1% of residents were under the age of 18 and 21.0% of residents were 65 years of age or older. For every 100 females there were 103.3 males, and for every 100 females age 18 and over there were 100.3 males age 18 and over. 0.0% of residents lived in urban areas, while 100.0% lived in rural areas.

The racial makeup of the county was 94.4% White, 0.6% Black or African American, 0.4% American Indian and Alaska Native, 0.4% Asian, 0.1% Native Hawaiian and Pacific Islander, 0.9% from some other race, and 3.2% from two or more races. Hispanic or Latino residents of any race comprised 2.6% of the population.

There were 4,040 households in the county, of which 30.7% had children under the age of 18 living with them and 19.7% had a female householder with no spouse or partner present. About 29.5% of all households were made up of individuals and 15.1% had someone living alone who was 65 years of age or older.

There were 4,490 housing units, of which 10.0% were vacant. Among occupied housing units, 77.8% were owner-occupied and 22.2% were renter-occupied. The homeowner vacancy rate was 1.3% and the rental vacancy rate was 9.4%.

=== 2000 census ===
As of the census of 2000, there were 10,717 people, 3,959 households, and 2,763 families residing in the county. The population density was 15 people per square mile (5.8 people/km^{2}). There were 4,340 housing units at an average density of 6 per square mile (2.3/km^{2}).

The racial makeup of the county was 98.35% White, 0.49% Black or African American, 0.23% Native American, 0.10% Asian, 0.06% Pacific Islander, 0.17% from other races, and 0.60% from two or more races. 0.71% of the population were Hispanic or Latino of any race.

There were 3,959 households, out of which 34.00% had children under the age of 18 living with them, 61.90% were married couples living together, 5.10% had a female householder with no husband present, and 30.20% were non-families. 28.00% of all households were made up of individuals, and 16.00% had someone living alone who was 65 years of age or older. The average household size was 2.58 and the average family size was 3.20.

In the county, the population was spread out, with 28.50% under the age of 18, 6.00% from 18 to 24, 24.10% from 25 to 44, 19.40% from 45 to 64, and 22.00% who were 65 years of age or older. The median age was 39 years. For every 100 females there were 97.00 males. For every 100 females age 18 and over, there were 95.10 males.

The median income for a household in the county was $34,296, and the median income for a family was $41,838. Males had a median income of $28,879 versus $19,340 for females. The per capita income for the county was $17,121. About 6.50% of families and 9.10% of the population were below the poverty line, including 9.90% of those under age 18 and 8.50% of those age 65 or over.

== Government ==
=== Presidential elections ===
Nemaha County is strongly Republican. Lyndon Johnson is the only Democrat to have carried the county since 1936.

Presidential election results

United States presidential election results for Nemaha County, Kansas
Year	Republican		Democratic		Third party(ies)	
Year	No.	%	No.	%	No.	%
1888	2,515	56.54%	1,682	37.81%	251	5.64%
1892	2,222	49.73%	0	0.00%	2,246	50.27%
1896	2,568	50.49%	2,478	48.72%	40	0.79%
1900	2,761	53.45%	2,348	45.45%	57	1.10%
1904	2,764	61.93%	1,564	35.04%	135	3.02%
1908	2,394	51.57%	2,182	47.01%	66	1.42%
1912	961	22.19%	1,936	44.71%	1,433	33.09%
1916	3,591	49.19%	3,579	49.03%	130	1.78%
1920	4,655	72.32%	1,731	26.89%	51	0.79%
1924	4,096	60.24%	1,846	27.15%	857	12.60%
1928	4,639	61.10%	2,919	38.45%	34	0.45%
1932	3,167	40.60%	4,578	58.69%	55	0.71%
1936	3,903	47.76%	4,175	51.09%	94	1.15%
1940	5,178	65.64%	2,679	33.96%	32	0.41%
1944	4,277	66.44%	2,149	33.39%	11	0.17%
1948	3,529	55.39%	2,810	44.11%	32	0.50%
1952	5,175	75.97%	1,618	23.75%	19	0.28%
1956	4,195	67.11%	2,038	32.60%	18	0.29%
1960	3,360	53.61%	2,884	46.02%	23	0.37%
1964	2,391	42.07%	3,260	57.36%	32	0.56%
1968	3,003	54.01%	1,925	34.62%	632	11.37%
1972	3,422	64.06%	1,777	33.26%	143	2.68%
1976	2,759	50.71%	2,586	47.53%	96	1.76%
1980	3,546	64.99%	1,600	29.33%	310	5.68%
1984	3,653	66.60%	1,761	32.11%	71	1.29%
1988	2,849	54.98%	2,261	43.63%	72	1.39%
1992	2,220	39.51%	1,580	28.12%	1,819	32.37%
1996	3,014	56.07%	1,648	30.66%	713	13.27%
2000	3,578	67.64%	1,494	28.24%	218	4.12%
2004	4,027	73.71%	1,355	24.80%	81	1.48%
2008	3,817	71.23%	1,432	26.72%	110	2.05%
2012	3,930	78.19%	1,000	19.90%	96	1.91%
2016	4,124	80.52%	725	14.15%	273	5.33%
2020	4,664	82.05%	927	16.31%	93	1.64%
2024	4,655	82.83%	888	15.80%	77	1.37%

=== Laws ===
Nemaha County was a prohibition, or "dry", county until the Kansas Constitution was amended in 1986 and voters approved the sale of alcoholic liquor by the individual drink with a 30% food sales requirement.

== Education ==
=== Unified school districts ===
- Prairie Hills USD 113
- Nemaha Central USD 115

School district office in neighboring county

- Onaga USD 322
- Vermillion USD 380

== Communities ==
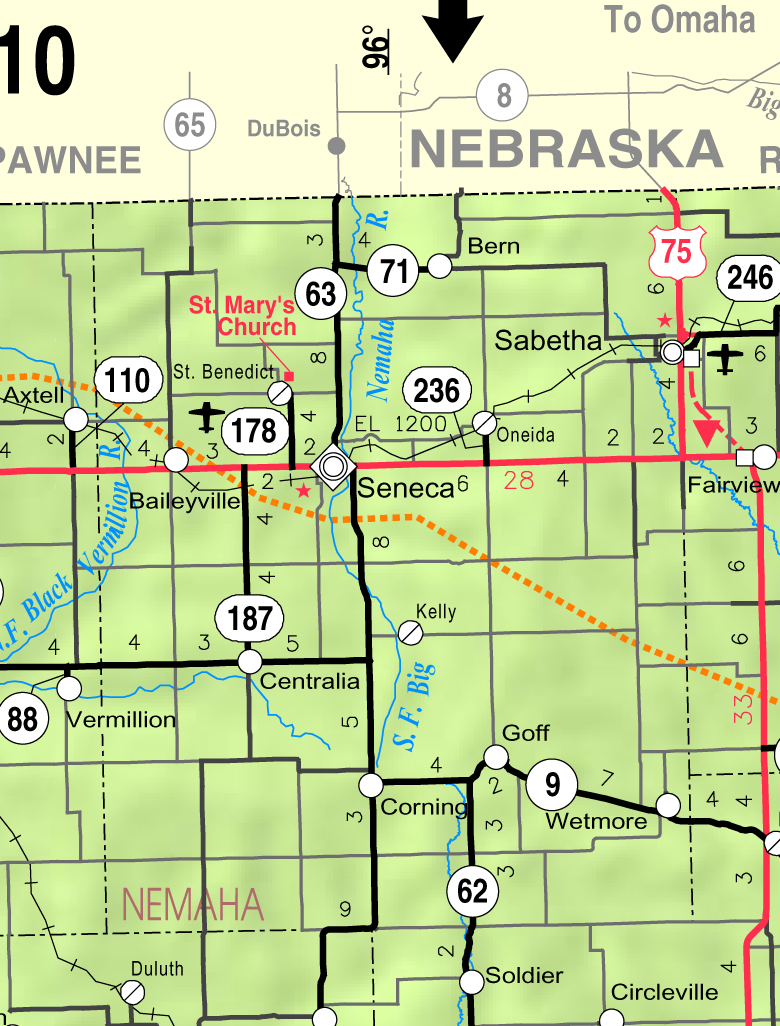
2005 map of Nemaha County (map legend)

List of townships / incorporated cities / unincorporated communities / extinct former communities within Nemaha County.

=== Cities ===
‡ means a community has portions in an adjacent county.

- Bern
- Centralia
- Corning
- Goff
- Oneida
- Sabetha‡
- Seneca (county seat)
- Wetmore

=== Unincorporated communities ===
† means a community is designated a Census-Designated Place (CDP) by the United States Census Bureau.

- Baileyville†
- Berwick
- Capioma
- Kelly†
- Neuchatel
- St. Benedict†
- Woodlawn

=== Townships ===
Nemaha County is divided into twenty townships. The cities of Sabetha and Seneca are considered governmentally independent and are excluded from the census figures for the townships. In the following table, the population center is the largest city (or cities) included in that township's population total, if it is of a significant size.

Sources: 2000 U.S. Gazetteer from the U.S. Census Bureau.
Township	FIPS	Population center	Population	Population density /km^{2} (/sq mi)	Land area km^{2} (sq mi)	Water area km^{2} (sq mi)	Water %	Geographic coordinates
Adams	00275		213	2 (6)	93 (36)	0 (0)	0.03%	39°46′38″N 95°57′36″W
Berwick	06375		391	4 (11)	93 (36)	0 (0)	0.02%	39°57′11″N 95°50′11″W
Capioma	10575		161	2 (4)	93 (36)	0 (0)	0.03%	39°47′28″N 95°51′18″W
Center	11900		200	2 (6)	94 (36)	0 (0)	0%	39°46′37″N 96°11′15″W
Clear Creek	13775		123	1 (3)	93 (36)	0 (0)	0%	39°57′27″N 96°10′56″W
Gilman	26275		223	2 (6)	93 (36)	0 (0)	0.19%	39°52′1″N 95°57′14″W
Grenada	27275		122	1 (3)	93 (36)	0 (0)	0.06%	39°41′23″N 95°51′10″W
Harrison	30375		399	4 (11)	93 (36)	0 (0)	0.06%	39°41′22″N 95°56′55″W
Home	32900		567	6 (16)	91 (35)	3 (1)	3.12%	39°42′36″N 96°9′17″W
Illinois	33725		453	5 (13)	93 (36)	0 (0)	0%	39°41′13″N 96°3′41″W
Marion	44775		457	5 (13)	94 (36)	0 (0)	0.02%	39°51′48″N 96°11′32″W
Mitchell	47475		305	3 (9)	93 (36)	0 (0)	0%	39°47′25″N 96°3′43″W
Nemaha	49625		184	2 (5)	92 (35)	0 (0)	0%	39°57′4″N 96°3′44″W
Neuchatel	50050		117	1 (3)	94 (36)	0 (0)	0%	39°36′27″N 96°11′25″W
Red Vermillion	58750		137	1 (4)	93 (36)	0 (0)	0.02%	39°36′17″N 96°4′0″W
Reilly	58900		153	2 (4)	93 (36)	0 (0)	0.07%	39°36′47″N 95°57′12″W
Richmond	59725		538	6 (16)	89 (34)	0 (0)	0%	39°51′34″N 96°3′49″W
Rock Creek	60600		302	3 (9)	88 (34)	0 (0)	0.28%	39°52′32″N 95°50′8″W
Washington	75675		465	5 (13)	93 (36)	0 (0)	0.01%	39°57′41″N 95°57′44″W
Wetmore	77575		503	5 (14)	93 (36)	0 (0)	0.02%	39°37′35″N 95°49′43″W

== See also ==
- National Register of Historic Places listings in Nemaha County, Kansas

Community information for Kansas

- Kansas locations by per capita income
- List of counties in Kansas
- List of townships in Kansas
- List of cities in Kansas
- List of unincorporated communities in Kansas
- List of ghost towns in Kansas
