= Osceola (baseball) =

- 1903; Osceola, Iowa

Minor league affiliations
- Class: Class D (1903)
- League: Southwest Iowa League (1903)

Major league affiliations
- Team: None

Minor league titles
- League titles (0): None

Team data
- Name: Osceola (1903)
- Ballpark: Unknown (1903)

The Osceola team was a minor league baseball team based in Osceola, Iowa.

In 1903, the "Osceola" club played as members of the short–lived Class D level Southwest Iowa League, joining the league in mid–season as an expansion team. Osceola won an informal championship series following the conclusion of the 1903 league season.

== History ==
In 1903 Osceola, Iowa first hosted minor league baseball when the "Osceola" team became members of the Southwest Iowa League during the season. The team was without a known nickname, common in the era. which began play on May 29, 1903. The members of the six–team Class D level Southwest Iowa League to begin the season were the Atlantic, Clarinda, Red Oak Blue Indians and Shenandoah teams, as the league began play on May 29, 1903, without an Osceola team.

On March 25, 1903, the Southwest Iowa League was formed at a league meeting. E.H. Whiteside, of Atlantic, Iowa was elected league president and a $400 monthly salary limit was established for league teams. The league began play with four Iowa teams in Atlantic, Clarinda, Shenandoah and Red Oak as the charter member franchises. The league disallowed playing games on Sundays. The cities of Glenwood, Iowa and Malvern, Iowa were unable to raise the necessary funds required for a league franchise.

After the Southwest Iowa League opened league play, Creston, Iowa formed a local team and played numerous exhibition games against league member teams. At the June 25, 1903, Southwest Iowa League meeting, Creston was awarded membership in the league and Osceola also was awarded a team, with the two new franchises expanding the league to six teams. Osceola had formed a team just weeks earlier. On June 29, 1903, Osceola and the Creston Cyclones teams began play in the league.

After beginning play in the Southwest Iowa League on June 29, an Osceola game against Atlantic was protested by Atlantic.

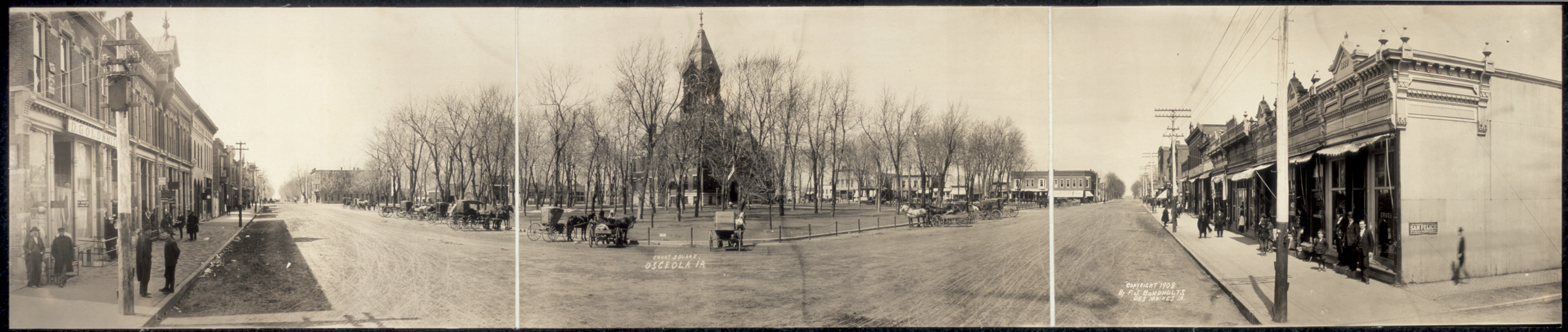
(1908) Court square, Osceola, Iowa

On August 29, 1903, the Southwest Iowa League folded after the Creston franchise dissolved. The First place Shenandoah team had folded July 18, 1903, leaving the league with four teams. After Nebraska City, Nebraska refused an offer to replace Shenandoah, the league considered dropping Osceola, as the team had a record of 1–11, but the league allowed Osceola to continue play. Eventually, Osceola had compiled an 18–29 record when the league ended the season on August 29, 1903. The fourth place Osceola team finished 11.0 games behind first place Atlantic in the final standings.

After the league had folded, the Creston and Osceola teams continued play. The two teams organized and played a winner-take-all post-season series for a $1,500 purse. Osceola then defeated Creston in five consecutive games to win the purse.

The Southwest Iowa League never reformed as a minor league. Osceola has not hosted another minor league team.

== The ballpark ==
The name of the Osceola home minor league ballpark is not directly referenced. It is known that Osceola and the Creston Cyclones played games against each other in the neutral town of Afton, Iowa.

== Year–by–year record ==
Year	Record	Finish	Manager	Playoffs/Notes
1903	18–29	4th	Unknown	Team joined league June 28; Defeated Creston in post season series

== Notable alumni ==
- The player roster for the Osceola team is unknown.
