= Hiawatha Athletics =

- 1910; (1910, 1912); Hiawatha, Kansas

Minor league affiliations
- Class: Class D (1910, 1912)
- League: Eastern Kansas League (1910); Missouri-Iowa-Nebraska-Kansas League (1912)

Major league affiliations
- Team: None

Minor league titles
- League titles (0): None

Team data
- Name: Hiawatha Indians (1910); Hiawatha Athletics (1912)
- Ballpark: League Park (1910, 1912)

The Hiawatha Athletics were a minor league baseball team based in Hiawatha, Kansas. In 1912, the Athletics played as members of the Class D level Missouri-Iowa-Nebraska-Kansas League. The Athletics were immediately preceded in minor league play by the 1910 Hiawatha Indians, who played the season as a member of the short-lived Class D level Eastern Kansas League. Both Hiawatha teams hosted home minor league games at League Park.

== History ==
Minor league baseball play began in Hiawatha, Kansas in 1910, when the Hiawatha Indians played as charter members of the six–team Class D level Eastern Kansas League. The 1910 team was also referred to as the "Boosters."

The Seneca, Sabatha, Holton, Horton Hammers and Marysville teams joined Hiawatha in league play. After beginning league play on June 8, 1910, Hiawatha ended their 1910 season with a record of 44–44 to place third in the Eastern Kansas League standings, playing the season under managers Spec Willey, Swift and Pepper Williford. Hiawatha finished 12.5 games behind the first place Sabetha team in the six–team league. The Eastern Kansas League permanently folded after its only season in 1910.

Minor league baseball returned to Hiawatha in 1912, with the team finishing last in the standings in a new league. The 1912 Hiawatha Athletics began play as members of the six-team, Class D level Missouri-Iowa-Nebraska-Kansas League, known informally as the MINK League. Hiawatha replaced the Clarinda Antelopes franchise in the league. The Auburn A's, Beatrice-Fairbury Milkskimmers, Falls City Colts, Humboldt Infants and Nebraska City Foresters teams joined Hiawatha in beginning league play on May 9, 1912.

On July 4, 1912, Falls City Colts pitcher Ed Finch threw the Missouri-Iowa-Nebraska-Kansas League's only no–hitter in a 7–0 Falls City victory over the Hiawatha Athletics.

The Athletics ended the 1912 season with a record of 35–66, placing sixth in the six–team MINK standings. Hiawatha finished 27.0 games behind the champion Falls City Colts. The Athletics played under managers Robert Kahl and Jack Forester. The Hiawatha franchise permanently folded after the 1912 season as the Missouri-Illinois-Nebraska-Kansas League reduced to four teams for their final season in 1913, with The Beatrice-Fairbury Milkskimmers also folding following the 1912 season.

Hiawatha, Kansas has not hosted another minor league team.

== The ballpark ==
The 1910 and 1912 Hiawatha teams played minor league home games at League Park in Hiawatha, Kansas. The location of League Park is unknown.

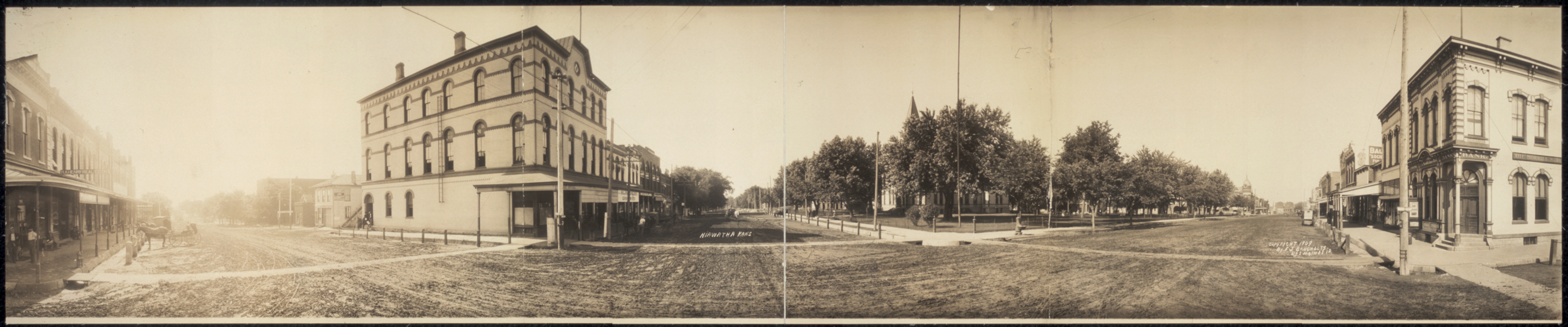
(1909) Hiawatha, Kansas

== Timeline ==
Year(s)	# Yrs.	Team	Level	League	Ballpark
1910	1	Hiawatha Indians	Class D	Eastern Kansas League	League Park
1912	1	Hiawatha Athletics	Class D	Missouri-Iowa-Nebraska-Kansas League	League Park

== Year–by–year records ==
Year	Record	Finish	Manager	Playoffs/Notes
1910	44–44	3rd	Spec Willey; Swift / Pepper Williford	No playoffs held
1912	35–66	6th	Robert Kahl / Jack Forester	No playoffs held

== Notable alumni ==
- Clifton Marr (1912)
