= Blue Rapids (baseball) =

- 1910; Blue Rapids, Kansas

Minor league affiliations
- Class: Class D (1910)
- League: Eastern Kansas League (1910)

Major league affiliations
- Team: None

Minor league titles
- League titles (0): None

Team data
- Name: Blue Rapids (1910)
- Ballpark: Riverside Park (1910)

The Blue Rapids baseball team was a minor league baseball team based in Blue Rapids, Kansas. In 1910, the Blue Rapids team played briefly as members of the Class D level Eastern Kansas League with no team moniker, common in the era. The 1910 season was the only season of play for the league and the Blue Rapids-based team. Blue Rapids hosted minor league home games at Riverside Park.

== History ==
The 1910 Blue Rapids team first brought minor league baseball to Blue Rapids, Kansas during the season. Blue Rapids played as charter members of the 1910 Class D level, six–team Eastern Kansas League. League members beginning the season were the Hiawatha Athletics, Holton, Horton, Marysville, Sabetha and Seneca. After the season began on June 8, 1910, Holton, with a 15–31 record, moved to Blue Rapids on August 25, 1910.

After joining 1910 league play, the Holton/Blue Rapids team finished their 1910 season in last place. With an overall record of 26–54 and 11–23 while based in Blue Rapids, the team ended the season in sixth place in the Eastern Kansas League standings, playing the season under manager Ted McGrew in both locations. Blue Rapids finished 26.5 games behind first place Sabetha in the six–team league.

The final 1910 Eastern Kansas League standings were led by Sabetha, who ended the season with a 53–28 record, followed by Seneca (46–39), Hiawatha Indians (44–44), Marysville (38–39), Horton (35–38) and Holton / Blue Rapids (26–54). The Eastern Kansas League permanently folded after their only season of 1910.

Blue Rapids, Kansas has not hosted another minor league team.

== The ballpark ==
The Blue Rapids team played 1910 minor league home games at Riverside Park. Riverside Park later hosted an exhibition game between the Chicago White Sox and New York Giants on October 24, 1913. The event occurred after $1,000 was raised to host the game, which occurred on a barnstorming tour by the two teams. Jim Thorpe, John McGraw Sam Crawford and Christy Mathewson were in uniform for the game, which drew 2,500 fans. Still in use today as a public park, Riverside Park is located at 305 West 5th Street in Blue Rapids, Kansas. There are historical markers at the park.

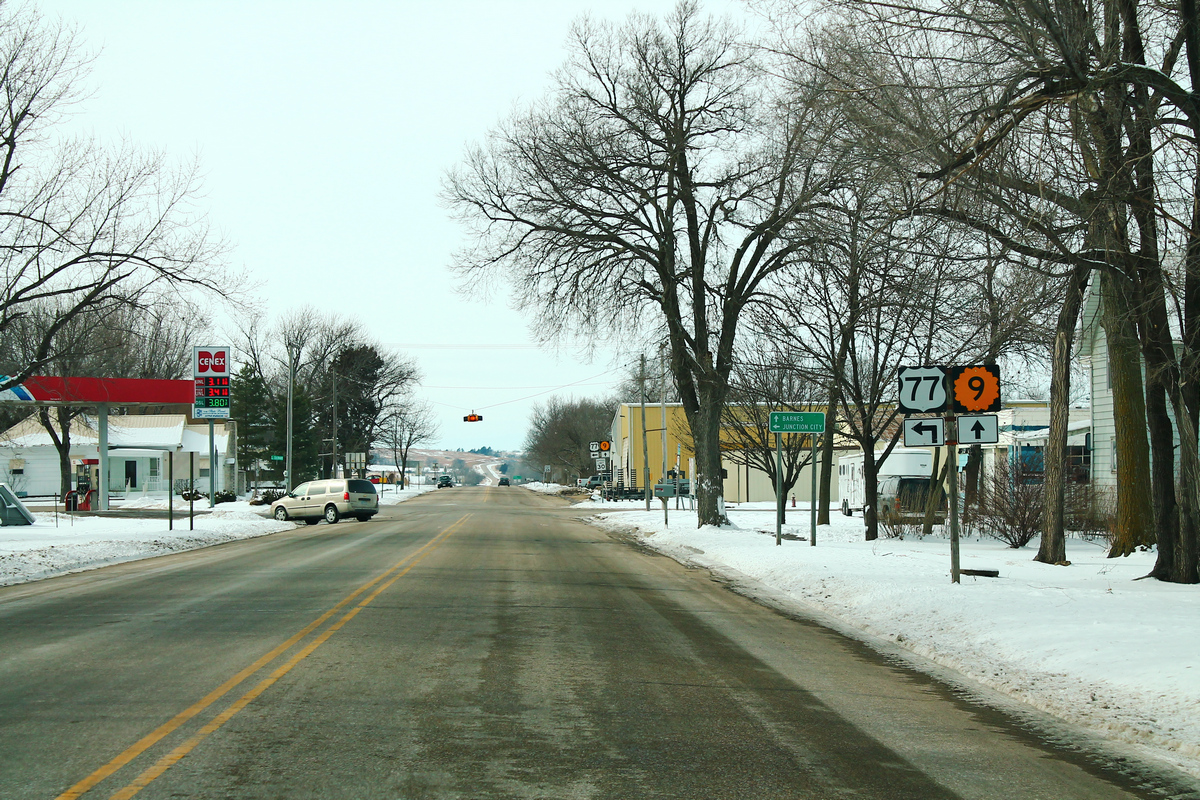
(2014) Blue Rapids, Kansas

== Timeline ==
Year(s)	# Yrs.	Team	Level	League	Ballpark
1910(1)	1	Holton	Class D	Eastern Kansas League	Riverisde Park
1910(2)	1	Blue Rapids	Class D	Eastern Kansas League	Riverisde Park

== Year–by–year records ==
Year	Record	Finish	Manager	Playoffs/Notes
1910	26–54	6th	Ted McGrew	Horton (15–31) moved to Blue Rapids August 25

== Notable alumni ==
- Ted McGrew (1910, MGR)
