= Horton (baseball) =

Horton "Hammers"
- 1910; Horton, Kansas

Minor league affiliations
- Class: Class D (1910)
- League: Eastern Kansas League (1910)

Major league affiliations
- Team: None

Minor league titles
- League titles (0): None

Team data
- Name: Horton (1910)
- Ballpark: Unknown (1910)

The Horton baseball team was a 1910 minor league baseball team based in Horton, Kansas. Horton played as members of the Class D level Eastern Kansas League. The 1910 season was the only season of play for both the league and the Horton, Kansas team. Local newspapers referred to the team as the "Hammers."

== History ==
The 1910 Horton team first brought minor league baseball to Horton, Kansas. Horton played as charter members of the 1910 Class D level, six–team Eastern Kansas League. The Hiawatha Athletics, Holton, Marysville, Seneca and Sabetha teams joined Horton as Eastern Kansas League charter members.

Horton was referred to as the "Hammers" in newspaper articles. In a game on June 21, 1910, Horton had a starting lineup of Steele C, Eppling SS, Hall 1B, Page 3B, Hill CF, McFee RF, Chapple 2B, Barsley P, Buckles LF in their 2–1 loss to Holton. The newspaper added in the game article that "if Horton people want a ball team they will have to 'come across.' League baseball is just as much a business proposition as any store industry in town."

On August 7, 1910, in the second game of a double header at Marysville, Horton pitcher Brownley threw a no-hitter against Marysville in a 2–1 Horton victory, with Masters playing catcher.

During the season, the Horton and Marysville franchised both disbanded from the league on September 1, 1910.

After folding during 1910 league play, Horton finished the season with an overall record of 35–38. The team ended the season in fifth place in the Eastern Kansas League standings, playing under manager Papa Church. Horton finished 14.0 games behind the first place Sabetha team in the six–team league final standings. The final 1910 Eastern Kansas League standings were led by Sabetha, who ended the season with a 53–28 record, followed by Seneca (46–39), Hiawatha Indians (44–44), Marysville (38–39), Horton (35–38) and Holton / Blue Rapids (26–54). The Eastern Kansas League permanently folded after their only season of 1910.

Horton, Kansas has not hosted another minor league team.

== The ballpark ==
The exact name and location of the 1910 Horton home ballpark is not directly referenced. The site of the Horton Aquatic Park was in use during the era as a public park. Today, the site is still in use and has a ballpark with multiple fields that are adjacent to the swimming pool. The location is 540 East 12th Street in Horton, Kansas.

== Year–by–year record ==
Year	Record	Finish	Managers	Playoffs/Notes
1910	35–38	5th	Papa Church	Team folded September 1

== Notable alumni ==
- Roster information for the 1910 Horton team in unknown.
