= Missouri-Iowa-Nebraska-Kansas League =

Minor League Baseball league

Missouri–Iowa–Nebraska–Kansas League
- Most recent season or competition: 1913 MINK League season
- Classification: Class D (1910–1913)
- Sport: Minor League Baseball
- First season: 1910
- Folded: June 17, 1913
- President: T.A. Wilson (1910–1911); Frederick Carey (1911); Warren Cummings (1912–1913)
- No. of teams: 9
- Country: United States of America
- Most titles: 1 Falls City Colts (1910); Maryville Comets/Humboldt Infants (1911); Nebraska City Forresters (1912); Auburn Athletics (1913)

The Missouri–Iowa–Nebraska–Kansas League, known informally as the "MINK" League, was a Class D level minor league baseball league that played from 1910 to 1913. The Missouri–Iowa–Nebraska–Kansas League consisted of teams based in the four states, but not always at the same time. The Missouri–Iowa–Nebraska–Kansas League permanently folded midway through the 1913 season.

Today, the M.I.N.K. Collegiate Baseball League, a collegiate summer baseball league has adopted the M.I.N.K. moniker.

== History ==
In 1910, the Missouri–Iowa–Nebraska–Kansas League began play as a six–team Class D level league. The league would play four seasons. The Auburn Athletics, Falls City Colts, and Nebraska City Forresters franchises all played for the duration of the league. Although the league was named the Missouri-Iowa-Nebraska-Kansas League, the four states were never represented in the league at the same time. Missouri and Iowa were represented in 1910–1911 and Kansas was represented in 1912.

The Missouri–Iowa–Nebraska–Kansas League presidents were T.A. Wilson (1910–1911), Frederick Carey (1911) and Warren Cummings (1912–1913).

In the first season for the league, the Falls City Colts won the 1910 MINK League Championship. The Missouri–Iowa–Nebraska–Kansas League began play with six teams, based in Auburn, Nebraska (Auburn Athletics), Clarinda, Iowa (Clarinda Antelopes), Falls City, Nebraska (Falls City Colts), Maryville, Missouri (Maryville Comets), Nebraska City, Nebraska (Nebraska City Forresters) and Shenandoah, Iowa (Shenandoah Pin Rollers). Falls City had a 57–40 (.588) record under manager Bill Annis to finish 1.5 games ahead of the 2nd place Clarinda Antelopes. Falls City led the league in season attendance, drawing 14,205. The Falls City Colts also moved some Sunday home games into the state of Kansas to avoid Nebraska Sunday laws.

The Maryville Comets/Humboldt Infants were the 1911 Missouri–Iowa–Nebraska–Kansas League champions after moving during the season. The Maryville, Missouri franchise, with a 24–21 record, moved to Humboldt, Nebraska on July 10, 1911. Maryville/Humboldt finished with a 59–41 (.590) record under managers Harry Sievers and A.F. Bridges, finishing in 1st place in the standings, finishing 2.0 games ahead of the 2nd place Falls City Colts and 7.0 games ahead of the 3rd place Auburn Athletics. The MINK League did not have playoffs during its existence. The league maintained itself as a six–team league in 1911, with the Shenandoah Pin Rollers (49–51), Clarinda Antelopes (43–57) and Nebraska City Foresters (40–60) rounding out the 1911 standings.

In the last full season of league play, the 1912 Nebraska City Forresters were the Missouri–Iowa–Nebraska–Kansas League champions. Nebraska City finished with a 61–38 (.616) record to lead the 1912 standings, playing under manager Ducky Holmes in the six–team league. Nebraska City finished 1.5 games ahead of the 2nd place Falls City Colts (61–41) and 2.5 games ahead of the 3rd place Auburn A's (59–41) in the final standings. The 1912 Beatrice-Fairbury Milkskimmers (42–59) replaced the Clarinda Antelopes, who folded after the 1911 season. Beatrice–Fairbury then folded after the 1912 season, as did the Hiawatha, Kansas based Hiawatha Athletics.

On July 4, 1912, Falls City pitcher Ed Finch threw the leagues' only no–hitter in a 7–0 Falls City victory over the Hiawatha Indians.

1913 was the final season for the MINK League, as the league played only a partial season, permanently folding in June, 1913. The Missouri–Iowa–Nebraska–Kansas League began the 1913 season with four teams after the Beatrice-Fairbury Milkskimmers and Hiawatha Indians franchises did not return to play and were not replaced. The 1913 Auburn Athletics, under manager Jake Kraninger, were in 1st place with 24–8 record, 9.0 games ahead of the 2nd place Nebraska City Forresters (15–17) when the Missouri–Iowa–Nebraska–Kansas League permanently folded. On June 17, 1913, the 3rd place Falls City Colts (13–19) and 4th place Humboldt Infants (12–20) both folded, causing the entire league to disband.

Sunday laws in Nebraska were noted as a factor that impacted the success of the league. Falls City had moved Sunday home games to Kansas in order to avoid the restrictions in Nebraska. Nebraska City played their week day games at their home park and their Sunday games at the Driving Park in Beatrice, Nebraska. This was a compromise with the ministerial alliance which had protested a game on Sunday during the 1910 season. Many fans traveled by train to catch a game, as the Missouri Pacific serviced league towns.

Today, the M.I.N.K. Collegiate Baseball League, a collegiate summer baseball league has adopted the moniker as a tribute to the earlier professional league. The league began play in 2009.

== Cities represented 1910–1913 ==
Team name	Town represented	Stadium	Year(s) active
Auburn Athletics	Auburn, Nebraska	Legion Park	1910 to 1913
Beatrice-Fairbury Milkskimmers	Beatrice, Nebraska & Fairbury, Nebraska	Driving Park	1912
Clarinda Antelopes	Clarinda, Iowa	Clarinda Ballpark	1910 to 1911
Falls City Colts	Falls City, Nebraska	Athletic Field	1910 to 1913
Hiawatha Athletics	Hiawatha, Kansas	League Park	1912
Humboldt Infants	Humboldt, Nebraska	Humboldt Lake Park	1911 to 1913
Maryville Comets	Maryville, Missouri	Unknown	1910 to 1911
Nebraska City Forresters	Nebraska City, Nebraska	15th Street Ballpark	1910 to 1913
Shenandoah Pin Rollers	Shenandoah, Iowa	Sportsman's Park	1910 to 1911

== Standings & statistics 1910–1913 ==
=== 1910 M.I.N.K. League ===
Team standings	W	L	PCT	GB	Managers
Falls City Colts	57	40	.588	–	Bill Annis
Clarinda Antelopes	56	42	.571	1½	Rudy Kling
Shenandoah Pin Rollers	47	52	.475	11	E.C. Fishbaugh
Auburn Athletics	46	51	.474	11	Warren Cummings
Maryville Comets	45	54	.455	13	Joe Wentz
Nebraska City Foresters	43	55	.439	14½	Bonwell

Player statistics
Player	Team	Stat	Tot	Player	Team	Stat	Tot
Joe Wentz	Maryville	BA	.304	Verne Hirsch	Auburn	W	25
Frank Hutchinson	Clarinda	Runs	69	Lawrence Casey	Clarinda	Pct	.750; 12–4
Ed Bright	Auburn	Hits	111				

=== 1911 M.I.N.K. League ===
Team standings	W	L	PCT	GB	Managers
Maryville Comets / Humboldt Infants	59	41	.590	–	Harry Sievers / A.F. Bridges
Falls City Colts	57	43	.570	2	Jack Forrester
Auburn Athletics	52	48	.520	7	L. Higgins
Shenandoah Pin Rollers	49	51	.490	10	Fred Wells
Clarinda Antelopes	43	57	.430	16	Frank Hutchinson
Nebraska City Foresters	40	60	.400	19	Daniel Nee / E.C. Pinkerton / T.A. Wilson

Maryville moved to Humboldt July 10.

Player statistics
Player	Team	Stat	Tot	Player	Team	Stat	Tot
Joe Stricker	Clarinda	BA	.349	Walter Hirsch	Auburn	W	22
Les Mann	Nebraska City	Runs	78	Jay Errett	Mary/Humb	Pct	.800; 8–2
Joe Stricker	Clarinda	Hits	128				

=== 1912 M.I.N.K. League ===
Team standings	W	L	PCT	GB	Managers
Nebraska City Foresters	61	38	.616	–	Ducky Holmes
Falls City Colts	61	41	.598	1½	Tony Vanderhill
Auburn Athletics	59	41	.590	2½	Jake Kraninger
Humboldt Infants	44	57	.435	18	Ira Plank
Beatrice-Fairbury Milkskimmers	42	59	.415	20	George Shriver
Hiawatha Athletics	35	66	.346	27	Robert Kahl / Jack Forester

Player statistics
Player	Team	Stat	Tot	Player	Team	Stat	Tot
Milt Drumm	Nebraska City	BA	.341	Vern Willey	Auburn	W	22
Milt Drumm	Nebraska City	Runs	65	Patrick Conway	Nebraska City	Pct	.714; 15–6
Ledger Free	Auburn	Runs	65	George Zonderman	Auburn	SO	195
Steve Brewer	Auburn	Hits	121				
Howard Marshall	Nebraska City	HR	7				

=== 1913 M.I.N.K. League ===
Team Standings	W	L	PCT	GB	Managers
Auburn Athletics	24	8	.750	–	Jake Kraninger
Nebraska City Foresters	15	17	.469	9	Jack Forrester
Falls City Colts	13	19	.406	11	Ira Bidwell
Humboldt Infants	12	20	.375	12	Warren Cummings

Falls City & Humboldt withdrew June 17, 1913 causing the league to disband.

== Notable alumni ==
- Bill Annis (1910–1911) Falls City, MGR
- Ducky Holmes (1912) Nebraska City, MGR
- Bill Kemmer (1910) Falls City
- Les Mann (1910–1911) Nebraska City
- Ray Miller (1910) Falls City
- Chuck Ward (1912) Falls City
- Charlie Wheatley (1911) Auburn
