= Auburn Athletics (Nebraska) =

- 1910–1913; Auburn, Nebraska

Minor league affiliations
- Class: Class D (1910–1913)
- League: Missouri-Iowa-Nebraska-Kansas League (1910–1913)

Major league affiliations
- Team: None

Minor league titles
- League titles (1): 1913

Team data
- Name: Auburn Athletics (1910–1913)
- Ballpark: Athletic Field (1910, 1913); League Park* (1913)

The Auburn Athletics were a minor league baseball franchise based in Auburn, Nebraska. From 1910 to 1913, the "Athletics" or interchangeable "A's" played as members of the Class D level Missouri-Iowa-Nebraska-Kansas League for the duration of the league, winning the 1913 league championship.

Auburn Athletics played home minor league games at the site known today as Legion Memorial Park.

== History ==
In 1910, the Auburn "Athletics" became the first minor league team based in Auburn, Nebraska. The Auburn Athletics began play as charter members of the six–team Class D level Missouri-Iowa-Nebraska-Kansas League, which was known informally as the "MINK League". Auburn was joined in the 1910 MINK League by the Clarinda Antelopes, Falls City Colts, Maryville Comets, Nebraska City Forresters and Shenandoah Pin Rollers teams as charter members.

In their first season, the 1910 Auburn Athletics finished with a 46–51 record and placed fourth in the MINK League standings, playing the season under manager W. Cummings. Auburn finished 11.0 games behind the first place Falls City Colts, as the league had no playoff system for its duration. In 1910, Auburn had total home season attendance of 10,522 an average of 217 fans per home game, playing at Legion Memorial Park. Auburn and the other Nebraska-based teams were affected by Sunday laws of the era in Nebraska, which prohibited working on Sundays and therefore disallowed professional baseball to be played on Sunday. Auburn pitcher Verne Hirsch led the league with 25 wins and teammate Ed Bright had 111 total hits, most in the league.

Continuing play in 1911, the Auburn Athletics placed third in the Missouri-Illinois-Nebraska-Kansas League final standings. The Athletics ended the 1911 season with a record of 52–48 under manager L. Higgins, finishing 7.0 games behind the first place Maryville Comets/Humboldt Infants. A new grandstand was built at the Auburn home ballpark for the 1911 season. Pitcher Walter Hirsch of Auburn had 22 wins to lead the league.

In 1912, Auburn Athletics or "A's" again placed third in the six–team Missouri-Illinois-Nebraska-Kansas League standings. The Athletics ended the 1912 season with a record of 59–41, finishing 2.5 games behind the first place Nebraska City Forresters who had 61–38 record. Jake Kraninger managed the Auburn team in 1912. Auburn had four league leaders. Pitcher Vern Willey had 22 wins to lead the MINK League, while teammate George Zonderman had 195 strikeouts. Ledger Free of Auburn led the league in scoring 65 runs, while teammate Steve Brewer had 121 total hits to lead league hitters.

Playing their final season, the Auburn Athletics won a championship in a shortened season. On June 17, 1913, the 1913 Auburn Athletics were in first place when the four–team Missouri-Illinois-Nebraska-Kansas League permanently folded. On that date, both the Falls City Colts and Humboldt Infants disbanded, which caused the Missouri-Illinois-Nebraska-Kansas League to fold. At the time, Auburn had a 24–8 record under manager Jake Kraninger and were 9.0 games ahead of the second place Nebraska City Forresters. Nebraska Sunday laws of the era were a factor impacting the success of the league. In 1913, Falls City had moved Sunday home games to Kansas in an effort to avoid the restrictive laws in Nebraska. Auburn has not hosted another minor league franchise.

== The ballpark ==
The Auburn Athletics reportedly played home minor league games at the Legion Memorial Park in Auburn. The exact name of the ballpark during the time the Athletics played there is unknown. A new grandstand was built in 1911. Still in use today as a public park, Legion Memorial Park is designated as a National Historic Park site (one of six in the state of Nebraska). The park is located at 1015 J Street Auburn, Nebraska.

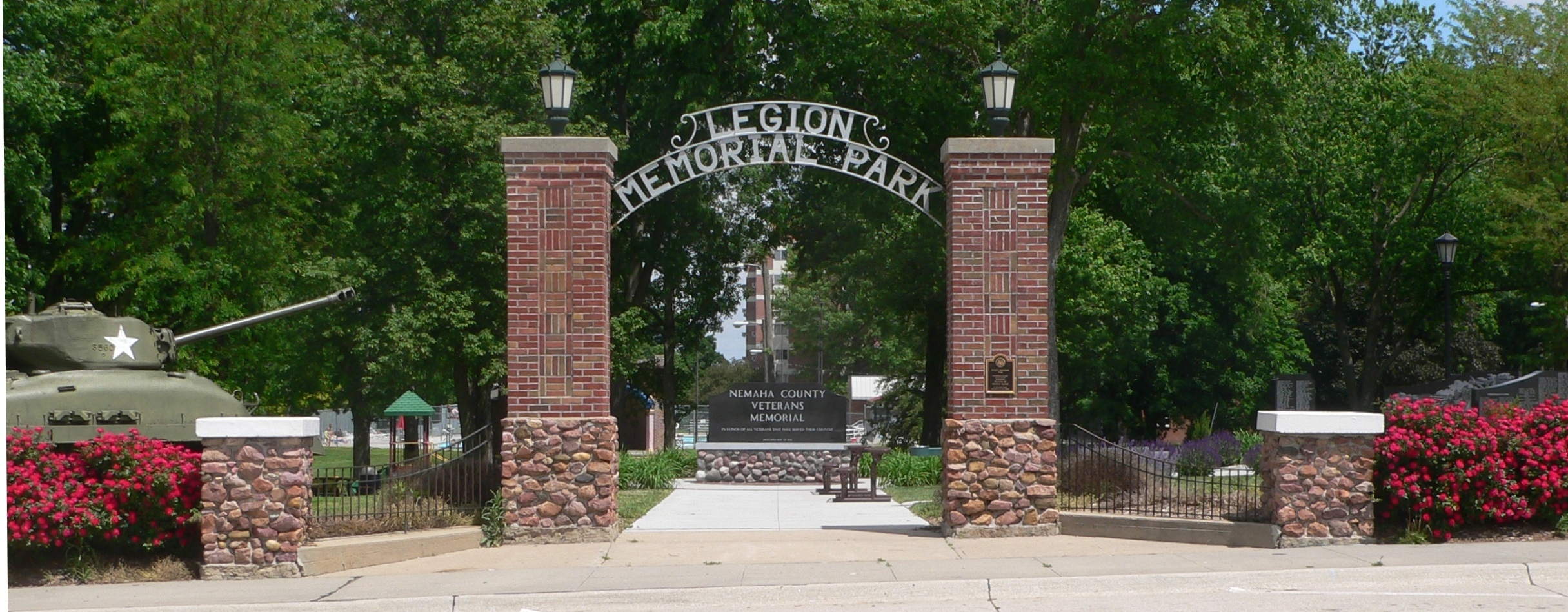
(2013) Legion Memorial Park entrance. Auburn, Nebraska

== Timeline ==
Year(s)	# Yrs.	Team	Level	League	Ballpark
1910–1913	4	Auburn Athletics	Class D	Missouri-Iowa-Nebraska-Kansas League	Legion Memorial Park

== Year–by–year records ==
Year	Record	Finish	Manager	Playoffs/Notes
1910	46–51	4th	W. Cummings	No playoffs held
1911	52–48	3rd	L. Higgins	No playoffs held
1912	59–41	3rd	Jake Kraninger	No playoffs held
1913	24–8	1st	Jack Kraninger	League Folded June 17; League champions

== Notable alumni ==
- Charlie Wheatley (1911)

== See also ==
Auburn Athletics players
