= Eastern Kansas League =

- Classification: Class D (1910)
- Sport: Minor League Baseball
- First season: 1910
- Folded: 1910
- President: Bert E. Black (1910); Irvin R. Curry (1910)
- No. of teams: 6
- Country: United States of America
- Most titles: 1 Sabetha (1910)

The Eastern Kansas League was a minor league baseball league that played in the 1910 season. The six–team Class D level Eastern Kansas League consisted of franchises based exclusively in Kansas. The Eastern Kansas League permanently folded after the 1910 season in which Sabetha won the league championship.

== History ==
The Eastern Kansas League began play on June 8, 1910, as six charter members formed for the 1910 Class D level League. The Eastern Kansas League was one of three leagues playing in Kansas in 1910, joining the Kansas State League and Central Kansas League.

The Eastern Kansas League charter league members beginning the season were the Hiawatha Indians, Holton, Horton, Kansas, Marysville, Kansas, Sabetha, Kansas and Seneca teams.

On August 25, 1910, during the 1910 season, Holton, with a 15-31 record, moved to Blue Rapids, Kansas. Both the Marysville and Horton franchises permanently disbanded on September 1, 1910.

The league schedule ended on September 15, 1910. The final Eastern Kansas League standings featured the first place Sabetha team with a record of 53–28, followed by Seneca (46–39), Hiawatha Indians (44–44), Marysville (38–39), Horton (35–38) and Holton/Blue Rapids (26–54) in the six–team league. The 1910 Hiawatha team was also referred to as the "Boosters."

The Eastern Kansas League permanently folded after their only season in 1910. On February 10, 1911, the Eastern Kansas League owners met in Hiawatha to discuss the 1911 season. During the meeting, the possibility of adding teams from Atchison, Kansas and Leavenworth, Kansas to the league was discussed. However, the league never began the 1911 season, folding in early May 1911. Problems with ballpark leases in Sabetha and Horton were problematic to the franchises continuing. Besides Hiawatha, no league cities ever hosted minor league baseball teams again.

== 1910 Eastern Kansas League teams ==
Team name	City represented	Ballpark	Year active
Blue Rapids	Blue Rapids, Kansas	Riverside Park	1910
Hiawatha Indians	Hiawatha, Kansas	League Park	1910
Holton	Holton, Kansas	Unknown	1910
Horton Hammers	Horton, Kansas	Unknown	1910
Marysville	Marysville, Kansas	High School Field	1910
Sabetha	Sabetha, Kansas	Sabetha Base Ball Park	1910
Seneca	Seneca, Kansas	City Park	1910

== Standing & statistics ==
=== 1910 Eastern Kansas League ===
Team standings	W	L	PCT	GB	Managers
Sabetha	53	28	.654	-	Harry Martin / Robert Kahl
Seneca	46	39	.541	9	Mike Simon / Tom Carmen
Hiawatha Indians	44	44	.500	12½	Spec Willey / Pepper Williford / Swift / Flemming
Marysville	38	39	.494	13	William Davidson / McDowell
Horton	35	38	.479	14	Papa Church
Holton / Blue Rapids	26	54	.325	26½	Ted McGrew

Player statistics
Player	Team	Stat	Tot	Player	Team	Stat	Tot
Robert Kahl	Sabetha	BA	.322				
Bill Barackman	Sabetha	Hits	74				
