= Maryville Comets =

- 1910–1911; Maryville, Missouri

Minor league affiliations
- Class: Class D (1910–1911)
- League: Missouri-Iowa-Nebraska-Kansas League (1910–1911)

Major league affiliations
- Team: None

Minor league titles
- League titles (1): 1911

Team data
- Name: Maryville Comets (1910–1911)
- Ballpark: Riffe's Ball Field (1910–1911)

The Maryville Comets were a minor league baseball team based in Maryville, Missouri. In 1910 and 1911, the "Comets" played exclusively as members of the Class D level Missouri-Iowa-Nebraska-Kansas League, winning the 1911 league championship in their final season.

Maryville hosted home minor league games at Riffe's Ball Field.

The Maryville "Comets" nickname corresponds with the 1910 appearance of Halley's Comet.

== History ==
Minor league baseball began in Maryville, Missouri in 1910. The Maryville "Comets" began play as charter members of the six–team Class D level Missouri-Iowa-Nebraska-Kansas League. The league became known informally as the MINK League. Maryville played with the Auburn Athletics, Clarinda Antelopes, Falls City Colts, Nebraska City Foresters and Shenandoah Pin Rollers teams as charter members in the new league.

The Maryville use of the "Comets" moniker corresponds with the 1910 appearance of Halley's Comet, as well as the meaning of a team starting a season on a winning streak. Local newspapers used the term "Joe Wentz' Comets" in describing the Maryville team in 1910 and the team continued with the moniker in 1911.

In their first season of play, Maryville finished the 1910 season with a record of 45–54, placing fifth in the MINK standings. The Comets finished 13.0 games behind the champion Falls City Colts. The Maryville Comets were led by player/manager Joe Wentz, who also led the league in hitting with a .304 average. Playing home games at their home ballpark, Maryville's total season attendance was 8,349, an average of 169 fans per game.

In their final season, the Maryville Comets won the 1911 Missouri-Illinois-Nebraska-Kansas League championship. However, the franchise relocated during the season. On July 10, 1911, the Maryville Colts had a 24–21 record when franchise relocated to Humboldt, Nebraska, finishing the 1911 season as the Humboldt Infants (the team in Humboldt has also been referred to as the "Indians" and "Orphans"). Maryville/Humboldt finished the 1911 season with a 59–41 overall record under Managers Harry Sievers and A.F. Bridges, finishing 2.0 games ahead of the second place Falls City Colts in the six–team league.

Maryville, Missouri has not hosted another minor league team.

== The ballpark ==
The Comet's home minor league ballpark was Riffe's Ball Field

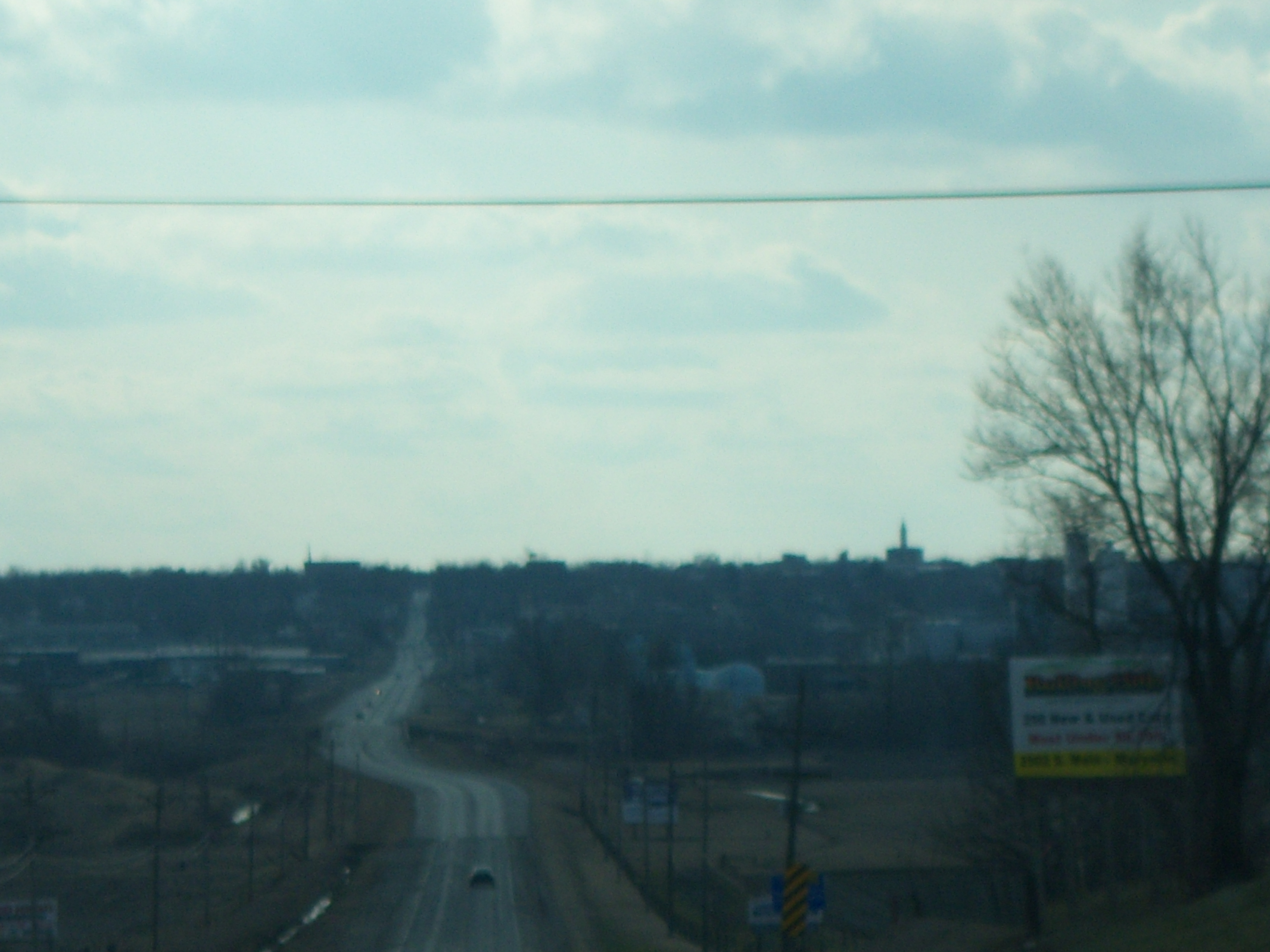
(2008) Maryville, Missouri skyline

== Timeline ==
| Year(s) | # Yrs. | Team | Level | League |
|---|---|---|---|---|
| 1910–1911 | 2 | Maryville Comets | Class D | Missouri-Iowa-Nebraska-Kansas League |

== Year–by–year records ==
| Year | Record | Finish | Manager | Playoffs/Notes |
|---|---|---|---|---|
| 1910 | 45–54 | 5th | Joe Wentz | No playoffs held |
| 1911 | 59–41 | 1st | Harry Sievers / A.F. Bridges | League champions |

== Notable alumni ==
No Maryville alumni reached the major leagues.
