= Nebraska City Forresters =

- 1910–1913; Nebraska City, Nebraska

Minor league affiliations
- Class: Class D (1910–1913)
- League: Missouri-Iowa-Nebraska-Kansas League (1910–1913)

Major league affiliations
- Team: None

Minor league titles
- League titles (1): 1912

Team data
- Name: Nebraska City Forresters (1910–1913)
- Ballpark: 15th Street Ballpark (1910–1913); Driving Park (1913)

The Nebraska City Forresters were a minor league baseball franchise based in Nebraska City, Nebraska. From 1910 to 1913, "Forresters" played exclusively as members of the Class D level Missouri-Iowa-Nebraska-Kansas League, winning the 1912 league championship.

Nebraska City hosted minor league home games at the 15th Street Ballpark, with some Sunday games played at the Driving Park in 1913.

== History ==
Minor league baseball began in Nebraska City in 1910, when the city first hosted a team. The Nebraska City "Forresters" team began play as charter members of the six–team Missouri-Iowa-Nebraska-Kansas League, which was known informally as the MINK League. Nebraska City played with the Auburn Athletics, Clarinda Antelopes, Falls City Colts, Maryville Comets and Shenandoah Pin Rollers teams as charter members in the new league.

On Opening Day their first season in 1910, with the business district closing for the game, the Forresters drew over 1,000 fans for a game against Clarinda. The mayor of Nebraska City threw out the first pitch, and the ball was auctioned off for the winning bid of $2.50. The 1910 Nebraska City Forresters finished with a record of 43–55, placing sixth in the Missouri-Illinois-Nebraska-Kansas League standings, 14.5 games behind the champion Falls City Colts. The 1910 Foresters were managed by Bonwell. Playing home games at the 15th Street ballpark, Nebraska City had total season attendance of 13,111; an average of 268 fans per game; and season gate receipts of $3,922.24. After the season, team treasurer H.O. Rice reported the franchise had a deficit of $637.00 for the season. Player salaries were published in the local newspaper along with team receipts. Turk Richter was the highest paid Nebraska City player, earning $271.95 for the season.

Nebraska had Sunday laws in many jurisdictions in the era, and the Nebraska City franchise had reached agreement with the local ministerial alliance that games would not be played on Sunday. On Sunday, June 26, 1910, several Nebraska City players played in a game and were arrested on a complaint from Reverend J.A. Koser after playing in a "pick-up game" at Driving Park in Beatrice, Nebraska.

The 1911 Nebraska City Forresters finished last in the Missouri-Illinois-Nebraska-Kansas League for the second consecutive season. The Forresters ended the 1911 season with a record of 40–60, placing sixth and finishing 19.0 games behind the first place Maryville Comets/Humboldt Infants in the Missouri-Illinois-Nebraska-Kansas League final standings. Daniel Nee, Clyde Pinkerton, and T.A. Wilson were the 1911 Forresters managers, and 35 players were used during the season.

A local business near the ballpark granted the team use of newly installed "shower baths." Nebraska City manager T.A. Wilson also served as the MINK League president in 1911. Playing at age 18, Nebraska city's Les Mann led the league in runs scored with 78. Mann had won two and placed in five events in the Nebraska state high school track meet as a junior, before missing the event in his senior year to report to Nebraska City to play baseball.

In 1912, after finishing in last place the previous two seasons, Nebraska City won the Missouri-Illinois-Nebraska-Kansas League championship. The Forresters ended the 1912 season with a record of 61–38, finishing 1.5 games ahead of the second place Falls City Colts. Ducky Holmes managed the Forresters to the championship.

During the season, Falls City was in first place for most of June and July. Nebraska City was in third place at the end of July before starting a winning streak that led them to first place and the Missouri-Illinois-Nebraska-Kansas League championship. Forrester Milt Drumm tied for the league lead in runs scored with 65 and pitcher Conway had a 15–6 record to lead the league in win percentage.

After winning the Championship, the town of Nebraska city held a "Beefstake" dinner to honor the Forresters. Three players, Marshall, Pat Conway and Cummings missed the event after being immediately signed by the Sioux City Packers of the Western League.

In their final season, the 1913 Nebraska City Forresters folded, along with the rest of the Missouri-Illinois-Nebraska-Kansas League during the season. In 1913, Nebraska City began playing their Sunday games at the Driving Park in Beatrice Nebraska as a compromise with the local ministerial alliance. The Falls City Colts and Humboldt Infants franchises both disbanded on June 17, 1913, causing the four–team MINK league to collapse. The Nebraska City Forresters ended their final Missouri-Illinois-Nebraska-Kansas League season with a record of 15–17 and were in second place when the league folded. Namesake Jack Forrester again served as manager, as the Forresters stopped play while 9.0 games behind the first place Auburn Athletics. Jack Forrester was immediately hired to be an umpire in the Nebraska State League after the Missouri-Illinois-Nebraska-Kansas League folded.

Nebraska City has not hosted another minor league franchise.

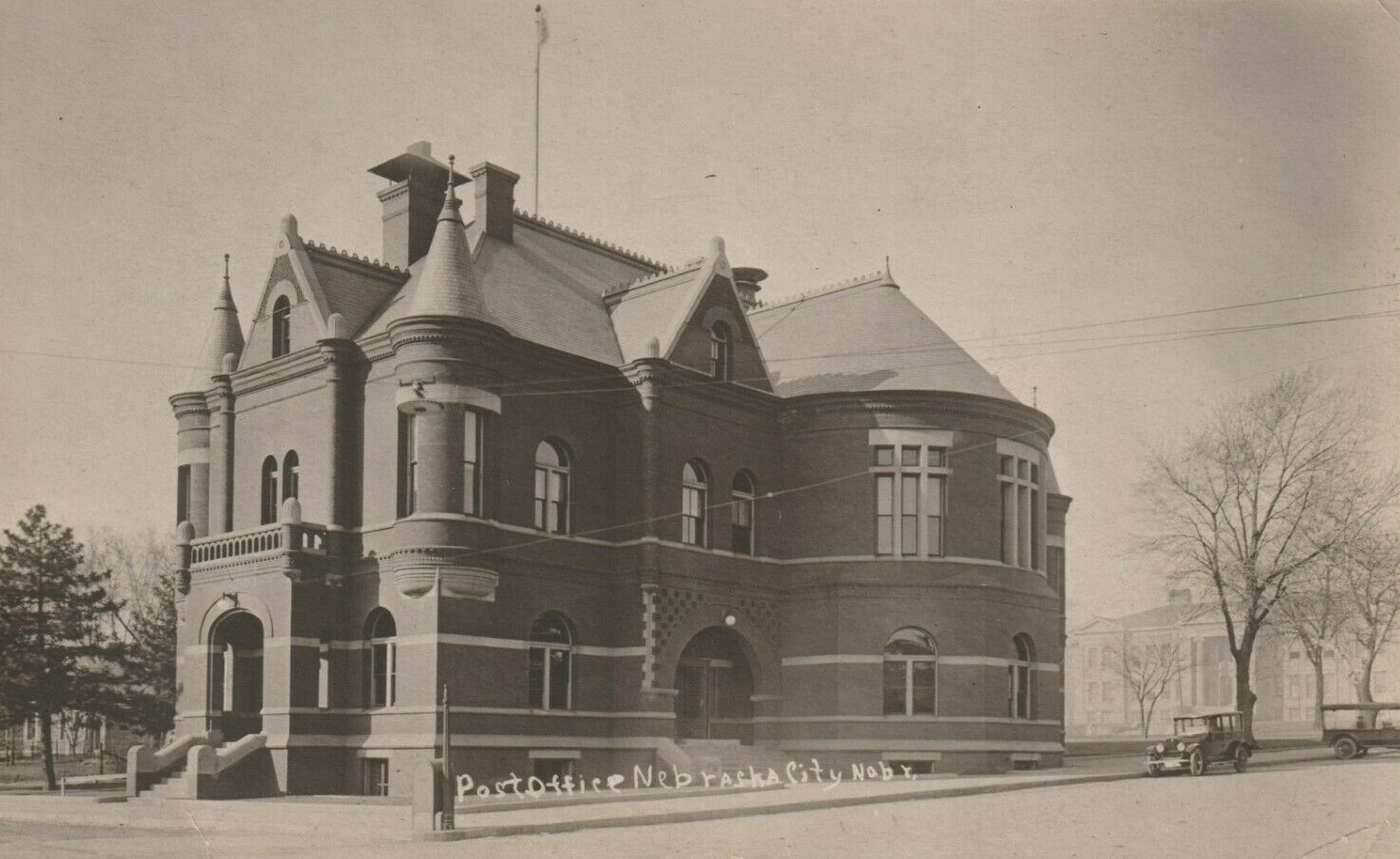
Nebraska City - 1918

== The ballparks ==
The Nebraska City Foresters hosted home minor league games at the 15th Street Ballpark in Nebraska City. Bleachers were added to the ballpark before the Foresters began play in 1910 and a nearby business installed showers for the players. Nebraska City also played some Sunday games at the Driving Park in Beatrice, Nebraska due to local Sunday Laws and as a compromise with the local ministerial alliance.

== Timeline ==
| Year(s) | # Yrs. | Team | Level | League | Ballpark |
|---|---|---|---|---|---|
| 1910–1913 | 4 | Nebraska City Forresters | Class D | Missouri-Iowa-Nebraska-Kansas League | 15th Street Ballpark |

== Year–by–year records ==
| Year | Record | Finish | Manager | Playoffs/Notes |
|---|---|---|---|---|
| 1910 | 43–55 | 6th | Bonwell | No playoffs held |
| 1911 | 40–60 | 6th | Daniel Nee / Clyde Pinkerton / T. A. Wilson | No playoffs held |
| 1912 | 61–38 | 1st | Ducky Holmes | League champions |
| 1913 | 15–17 | 2nd | Jack Forrester | League Folded June 17 |

== Notable alumni ==
- Ducky Holmes (1912, MGR)
- Les Mann (1910–1911)
- Nebraska City Forresters players
