= Edward White (Medal of Honor) =

US Army Medal Honor recipient (1877–1908)

- Born: January 15, 1877; Seneca, Kansas
- Died: December 3, 1908 (aged 31); Kansas City, Kansas, U.S.
- Burial place: Mount Calvary Cemetery, Kansas City, Kansas
- Military career
- Allegiance: United States of America
- Branch: United States Army
- Service years: 1898–1899
- Rank: Private
- Units: Company B, 20th Kansas Volunteer Infantry
- Conflicts: Philippine–American War
- Awards: Medal of Honor

Edward White (January 15, 1877 – December 3, 1908) was a private in the United States Army and a Medal of Honor recipient for his role in the Philippine–American War.

Following his military service, White became a firefighter in Kansas City, but was forced to retire in 1905 due to ill health. He died from tuberculosis a few years later, and was buried in Mount Calvary Cemetery, Kansas City, Kansas.

== Medal of Honor citation ==
Rank and organization: Private, Company B, 20th Kansas Volunteer Infantry. Place and date: At Calumpit, Luzon, Philippine Islands, 27 April 1899. Entered service at: Kansas City, Kans. Birth: Seneca, Kans. Date of issue: 11 March 1902.

Citation:

Swam the Rio Grande de Pampanga in face of the enemy's fire and fastened a rope to occupied trenches, thereby enabling the crossing of the river and the driving of the enemy from his fortified position.

== See also ==
- List of Medal of Honor recipients
- List of Philippine–American War Medal of Honor recipients
