= Shenandoah Pin Rollers =

- 1910–1911; (1903, 1910–1911); Shenandoah, Iowa

Minor league affiliations
- Class: Class D (1903, 1910–1911)
- League: Southwest Iowa League (1903); Missouri-Iowa-Nebraska-Kansas League (1910–1911)

Major league affiliations
- Team: None

Minor league titles
- League titles (0): None
- Conference titles (1): 1903

Team data
- Name: Shenandoah (1903); Shenandoah Pin Rollers (1910–1911)
- Ballpark: Sportsman's Park (1903, 1910–1911)

The Shenandoah Pin Rollers were a minor league baseball team based in Shenandoah, Iowa. The "Pin Rollers" played as members of the Class D level Missouri-Iowa-Nebraska-Kansas League in 1910 and 1911. Shenandoah first played as members of the 1903 Class D level 1903 Southwest Iowa League, winning a league pennant in a shortened season.

The Shenandoah teams hosted home minor league games at Sportsman's Park in Shenandoah. The park is still in use today as a public park

== History ==
=== 1903: Southwest Iowa League ===
The 1903 Shenandoah team was the first minor league baseball team based in Shenandoah, Iowa and won a partial league championship. The team was without a formal nickname, common in the era. Shenandoah played as a charter member of the 1903 six–team Class D level Southwest Iowa League and won a title in a split-season schedule before folding. The Atlantic, Iowa, Clarinda, Creston Cyclones, Osceola, Iowa and Red Oak Blue Indians teams joined Shenandoah in beginning league play on May 29, 1903.

Shenandoah was in first place with a record of 22–14 when the franchise folded on July 18, 1903. At the time they folded, the team had won the first half championship in the league. The Shenandoah manager was William Tiley. Atlantic won the second half of the split season and had the league's best overall record. The 1903 Southwest Iowa League permanently folded after their only season of play.

=== 1910 & 1911: Pin Rollers / Missouri-Iowa-Nebraska-Kansas League ===
In 1910, minor league baseball returned to Shenandoah. The Shenandoah "Pin Rollers" began play as charter members of the six–team, Class D level Missouri-Iowa-Nebraska-Kansas League, known informally as the "MINK League." The fellow charter member Falls City Colts, Clarinda Antelopes, Auburn Athletics, Maryville Comets and Nebraska City Forresters teams joined with Shenandoah in beginning league play on May 1910.

Shenandoah's team "Pin Rollers" nickname corresponds to the city being a leader in the seed and industry in the era, with the pin rollers aiding in planting seeds. Shenandoah was known as the "Seed and Nursery Center of the World" and the Earl May Seed Company was founded in the city.

The Pin Rollers ended the 1910 season with a record of 47–52, placing third in the MINK league standings. The Pin Rollers finished 11.0 games behind the first place Falls City Colts, while playing the season under Manager E.C. Fishbaugh. Playing home games at the Sportsman's Park, season attendance was 12,599, an average of 255 per home game.

The Shenandoah Pin Rollers played their final season in 1911. The Pin Rollers placed fourth in the Missouri-Illinois-Nebraska-Kansas League final standings with a 49–51 record, playing under manager Fred Wells. Shenandoah finished 10.0 games behind the first place Maryville Comets/Humboldt Infants team in the final standings. The Shenandoah Pin Rollers franchise folded from the MINK league after the season, along with the Clarinda Antelopes.

Shenandoah, Iowa has not hosted another minor league franchise.

== The ballpark ==
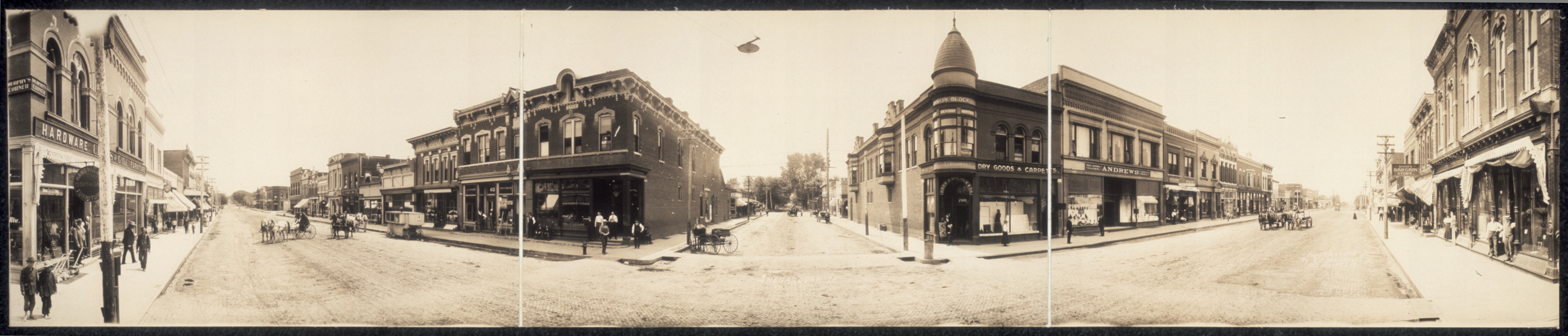
(1908) Shenandoah, Iowa.

The Shenandoah teams hosted their home minor league games at the Sportsman's Park. The 28–acre park is still in use today as a public park. The ballpark hosts the Shenandoah High School baseball and softball teams. Sportsman's Park is located on Ferguson Road in the Northern section of Shenandoah, Iowa.

== Timeline ==
Year(s)	# Yrs.	Team	Level	League	Ballpark
1903	1	Shenandoah	Class D	Southwest Iowa League	Sportsman's Park
1910–1911	2	Shenandoah Pin Rollers	Class D	Missouri-Iowa-Nebraska-Kansas League	Sportsman's Park

== Year–by–year records ==
Year	Record	Finish	Manager	Playoffs/Notes
1903	22–14	NA	William Tiley	Won 1st half pennant Team folded July 18
1910	47–52	3rd	E.C. Fishbaugh	No playoffs held
1911	49–51	4th	Fred Wells	No playoffs held

== Notable alumni ==
No alumni of Shenandoah teams advanced to the major leagues.
