= Seneca, Kansas =

City in Nemaha County, Kansas

- City and County seat
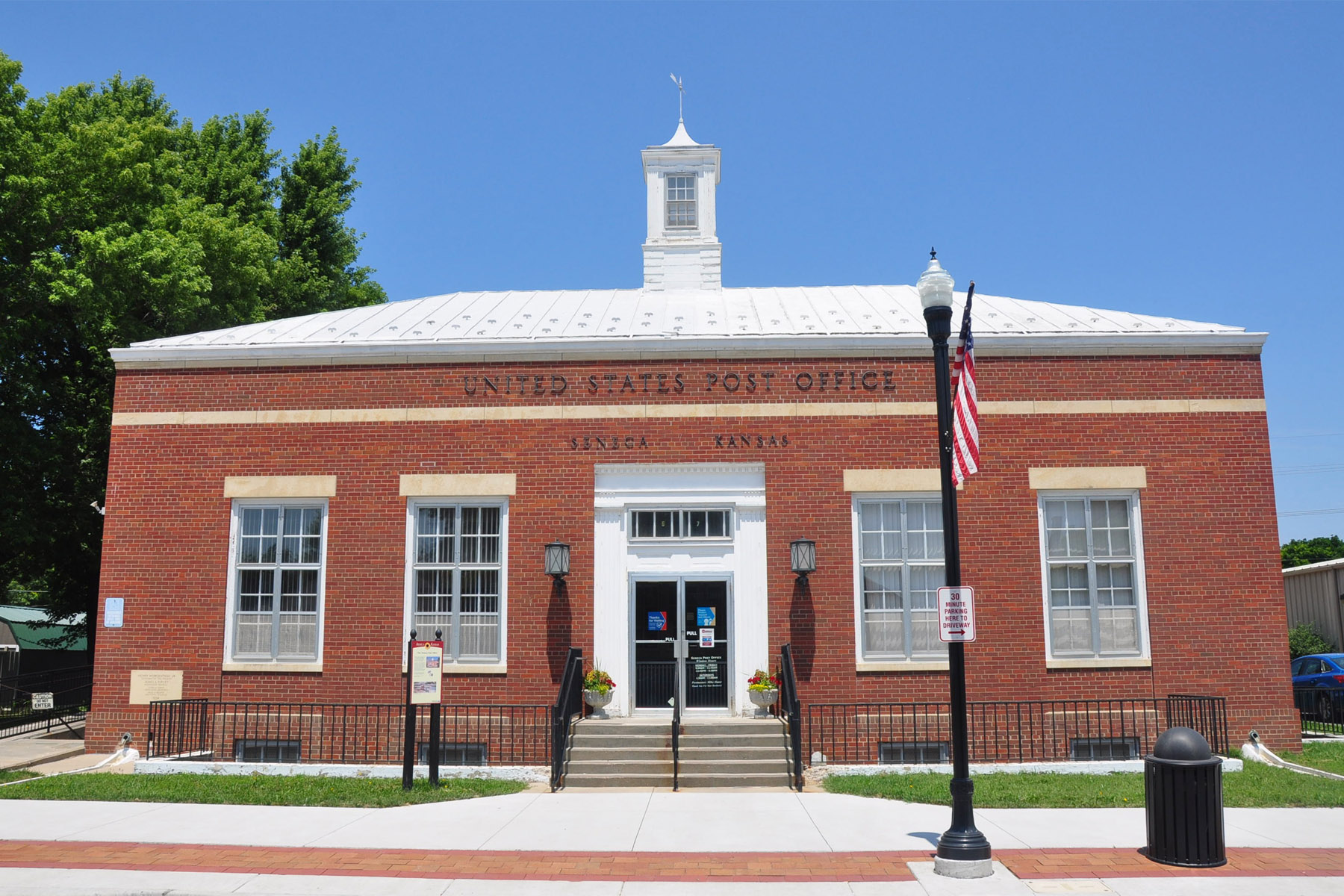
- Post Office in Seneca (2021)

- Location within Nemaha County and Kansas

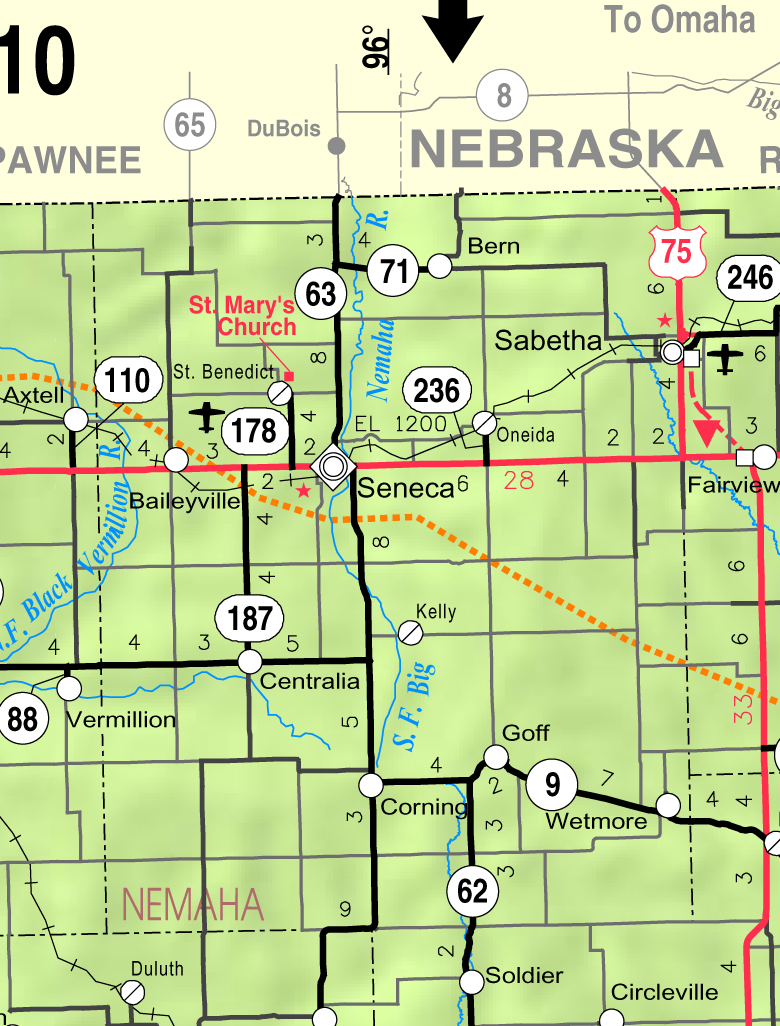
- KDOT map of Nemaha County (legend)
- Coordinates: 39°50′17″N 96°04′11″W
- Country: United States
- State: Kansas
- County: Nemaha
- Founded: 1857
- Incorporated: 1870
- Named for: Seneca County, Ohio

Area
  - Total: 1.67 sq mi (4.32 km^{2})
  - Land: 1.67 sq mi (4.32 km^{2})
  - Water: 0 sq mi (0.00 km^{2})
- Elevation: 1,152 ft (351 m)

Population (2020)
  - Total: 2,139
  - Density: 1,280/sq mi (495/km^{2})
- Time zone: UTC-6 (CST)
  - Summer (DST): UTC-5 (CDT)
- ZIP Code: 66538
- Area code: 785
- FIPS code: 20-63950
- GNIS ID: 485651
- Website: senecakansas.com

Seneca is a city in and the county seat of Nemaha County, Kansas, United States. As of the 2020 census, the population of the city was 2,139.

== History ==
Seneca was founded in 1857. It was named after Seneca County, Ohio. The first post office in Seneca was established in November 1858. Seneca grew up along the wagon route from St. Joseph, Missouri to Oregon and California. British explorer Richard Francis Burton en route to California in 1860 passed through town and noted: "... Seneca, a city consisting of a few shanties ..." Seneca was a station on the Pony Express of the early 1860s. The station was located in the Smith Hotel, at the present-day location of Fourth and Main Streets. Seneca was incorporated as a city in 1870.

Seneca was home to minor league baseball. The Seneca team played the 1910 season as members of the Class D level Eastern Kansas League, finishing in 2nd place. The team played home games at City Park.

== Geography ==
According to the United States Census Bureau, the city has a total area of 1.63 square miles (4.22 km^{2}), all land.

== Demographics ==
Historical population
Census	Pop.	Note	%±
1880	1,203		—
1890	2,032		68.9%
1900	1,846		−9.2%
1910	1,806		−2.2%
1920	1,885		4.4%
1930	1,864		−1.1%
1940	2,015		8.1%
1950	1,911		−5.2%
1960	2,072		8.4%
1970	2,182		5.3%
1980	2,389		9.5%
1990	2,027		−15.2%
2000	2,122		4.7%
2010	1,991		−6.2%
2020	2,139		7.4%
U.S. Decennial Census

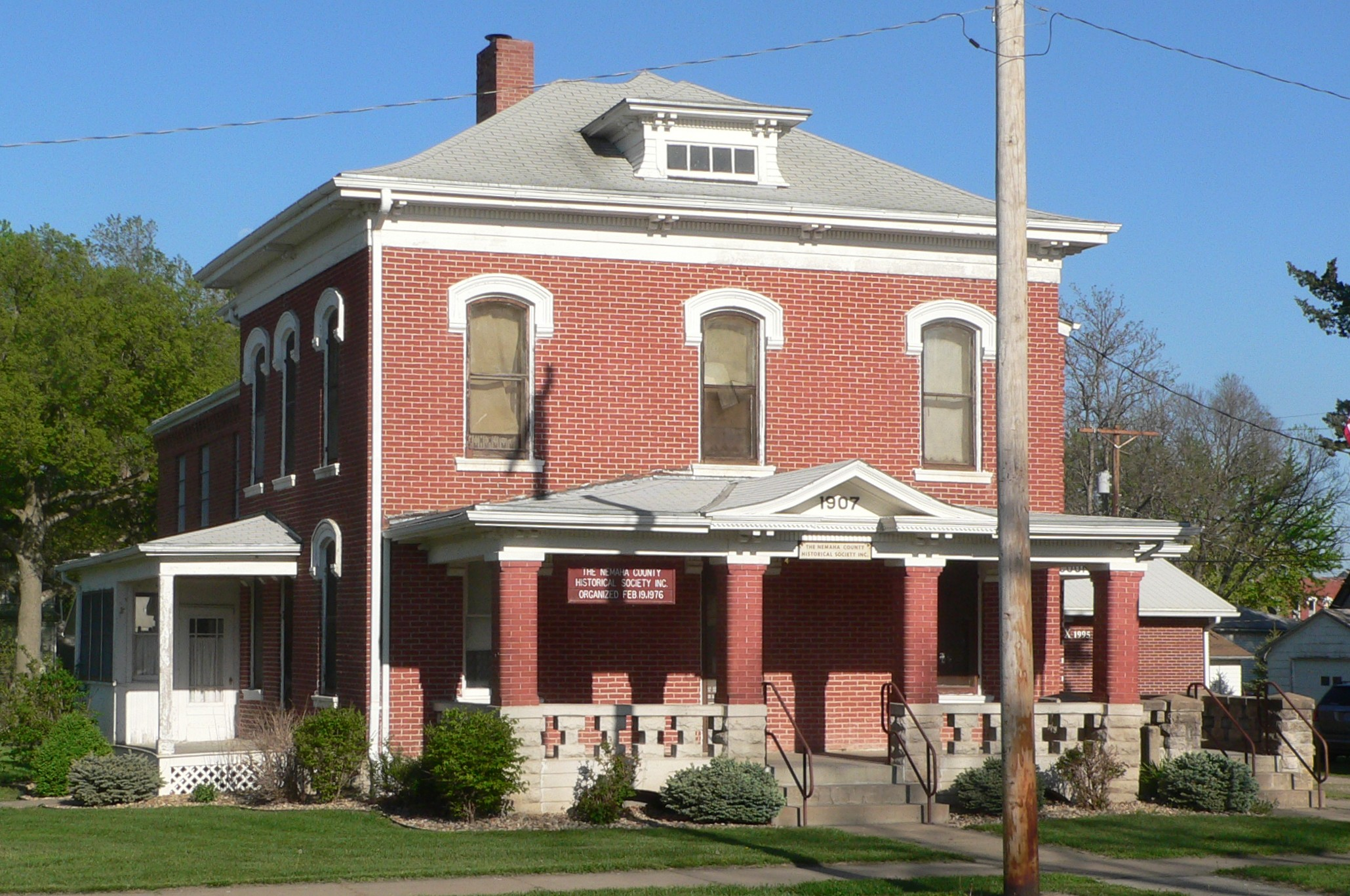
Nemaha County Historical Society (previously a Jail and Sheriff residence) (2015)

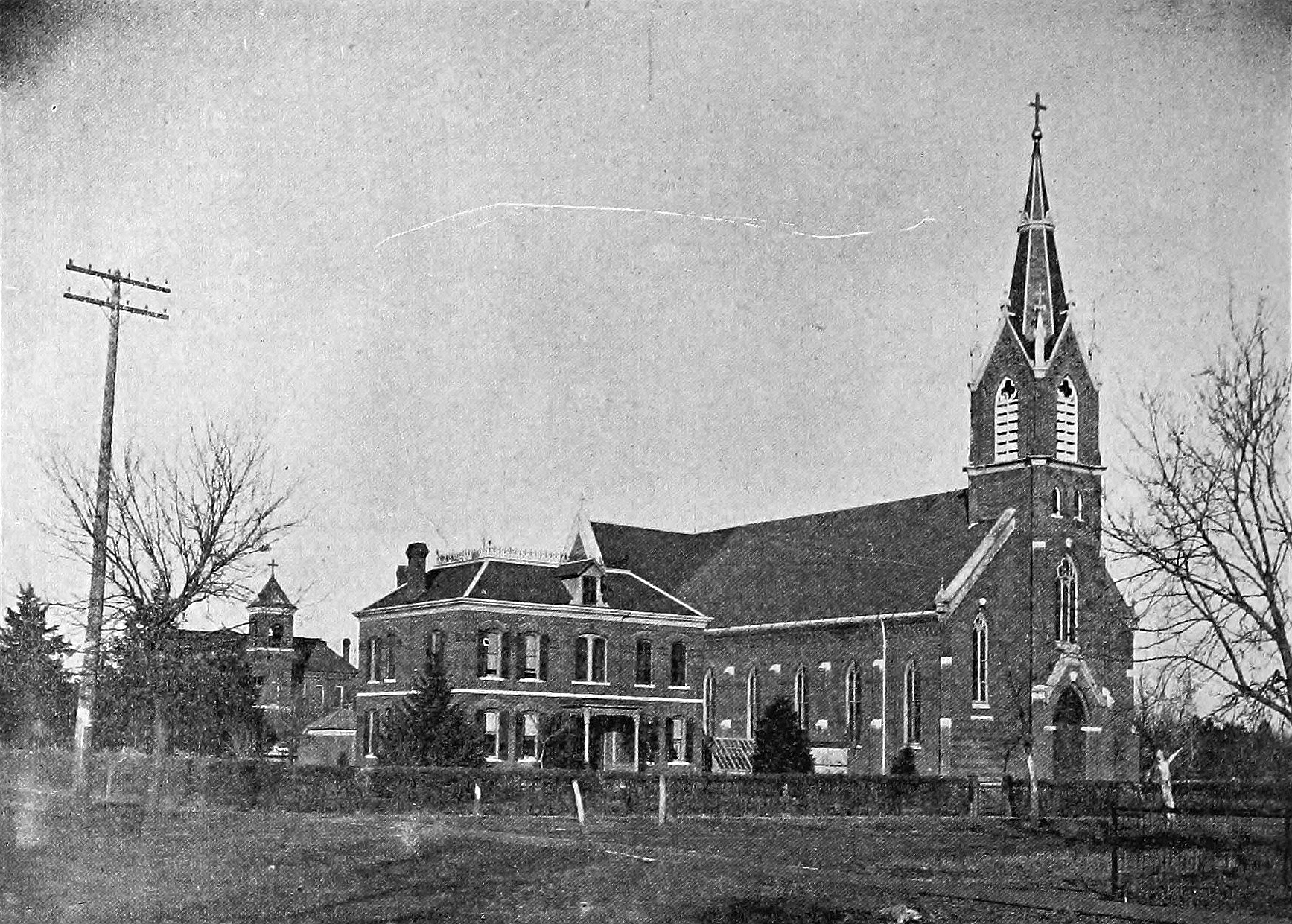
Saints Peter and Paul Catholic Church (1916)

=== 2020 census ===
As of the 2020 census, Seneca had a population of 2,139. The median age was 46.0 years. 22.9% of residents were under the age of 18 and 28.0% of residents were 65 years of age or older. For every 100 females there were 95.5 males, and for every 100 females age 18 and over there were 91.0 males age 18 and over.

0.0% of residents lived in urban areas, while 100.0% lived in rural areas.

There were 929 households in Seneca, of which 25.1% had children under the age of 18 living in them. Of all households, 49.2% were married-couple households, 19.1% were households with a male householder and no spouse or partner present, and 29.5% were households with a female householder and no spouse or partner present. About 38.2% of all households were made up of individuals and 20.8% had someone living alone who was 65 years of age or older.

There were 1,040 housing units, of which 10.7% were vacant. The homeowner vacancy rate was 2.0% and the rental vacancy rate was 9.1%.

Racial composition as of the 2020 census
Race	Number	Percent
White	2,000	93.5%
Black or African American	18	0.8%
American Indian and Alaska Native	3	0.1%
Asian	2	0.1%
Native Hawaiian and Other Pacific Islander	1	0.0%
Some other race	46	2.2%
Two or more races	69	3.2%
Hispanic or Latino (of any race)	103	4.8%

=== 2010 census ===
As of the census of 2010, there were 1,991 people, 908 households, and 509 families living in the city. The population density was 1,221.5 inhabitants per square mile (471.6/km^{2}). There were 982 housing units at an average density of 602.5 per square mile (232.6/km^{2}). The racial makeup of the city was 98.6% White, 0.4% African American, 0.2% Native American, 0.1% Asian, 0.1% Pacific Islander, 0.3% from other races, and 0.4% from two or more races. Hispanic or Latino of any race were 0.7% of the population.

There were 908 households, of which 21.8% had children under the age of 18 living with them, 47.6% were married couples living together, 6.3% had a female householder with no husband present, 2.2% had a male householder with no wife present, and 43.9% were non-families. 40.5% of all households were made up of individuals, and 22.7% had someone living alone who was 65 years of age or older. The average household size was 2.09 and the average family size was 2.84.

The median age in the city was 49.2 years. 20.2% of residents were under the age of 18; 4.8% were between the ages of 18 and 24; 18.3% were from 25 to 44; 28.7% were from 45 to 64; and 28.2% were 65 years of age or older. The gender makeup of the city was 48.5% male and 51.5% female.

=== 2000 census ===
As of the census of 2000, there were 2,122 people, 897 households, and 539 families living in the city. The population density was 1,375.0 inhabitants per square mile (530.9/km^{2}). There were 978 housing units at an average density of 633.7 per square mile (244.7/km^{2}). The racial makeup of the city was 98.82% White, 0.42% African American, 0.05% Native American, 0.05% Asian, 0.05% from other races, and 0.61% from two or more races. Hispanic or Latino of any race were 0.66% of the population.

There were 897 households, out of which 27.9% had children under the age of 18 living with them, 52.7% were married couples living together, 5.5% had a female householder with no husband present, and 39.8% were non-families. 36.9% of all households were made up of individuals, and 23.4% had someone living alone who was 65 years of age or older. The average household size was 2.29 and the average family size was 3.06.

In the city, the population was spread out, with 25.5% under the age of 18, 6.1% from 18 to 24, 22.0% from 25 to 44, 19.4% from 45 to 64, and 27.0% who were 65 years of age or older. The median age was 42 years. For every 100 females, there were 86.6 males. For every 100 females age 18 and over, there were 84.6 males.

The median income for a household in the city was $31,288, and the median income for a family was $40,819. Males had a median income of $27,875 versus $16,944 for females. The per capita income for the city was $19,076. About 4.4% of families and 7.1% of the population were below the poverty line, including 6.8% of those under age 18 and 8.0% of those age 65 or over.

== Education ==
The community is served by Nemaha Central USD 115 public school district.

== Notable people ==
- Roy E. Moore, the father of American gymnastics
- John Riggins, Pro Football Hall of Famer, won a Super Bowl with the Washington Redskins, named Super Bowl XVII MVP.
- Ira K. Wells, Judge, United States District Court for the District of Puerto Rico
- Edward White, Philippine–American War veteran and recipient of the Medal of Honor

== See also ==
- Tornado outbreak sequence of May 1896 - F5 tornado that struck Seneca
