= Southwest Iowa League =

Minor League Baseball league

- Classification: Class D (1903)
- Sport: Minor League Baseball
- Founder: E.H. Whiteside
- First season: 1903
- Folded: August 29, 1903
- President: E.H. Whiteside (1903)
- No. of teams: 6
- Country: United States of America
- Most titles: 1 Atlantic (1903)
- Related competitions: Iowa State League

The Southwest Iowa League was a minor league baseball league that played in the 1903 season. The Class D level, six–team Southwest Iowa League consisted of teams based in the Southwest Iowa region. The Southwest Iowa League played only the 1903 season, permanently folding on August 29, 1903.

== History ==
The Southwest Iowa League began minor league play on May 29, 1903, as a Class D level four–team league, under the direction of league president E.H. Whiteside. The Southwest Iowa League was designed to play two separate half seasons for the league standings.

The roots of the Southwest Iowa League began at a January 26, 1903 meeting held in Shenandoah, Iowa. There, a board of directors was established for the desired league. Original plans called for an eight–team league, with clubs to be formed among several interested Iowa towns and two Nebraska cities: Nebraska City, Nebraska and Plattsmouth, Nebraska. At the January 26 meeting, it was established that interested cities needed to apply for membership and provide a $100 application fee.

On March 25, 1903, the new league was formalized at a meeting held at the Hotel Johnson in Red Oak, Iowa. The new league was named the "Southwest Iowa League" and E.H. Whiteside, of Atlantic, Iowa was elected president. At the conclusion of the meeting, four Iowa teams in Atlantic, Clarinda, Shenandoah and Red Oak were ultimately chosen as the charter member franchises. Council Bluffs, Iowa and Nebraska City were originally selected for membership, but both backed out when it was decided to disallow playing games on Sunday. Glenwood, Iowa and Malvern, Iowa could not raise the application fees. Creston, Iowa was concerned about the league's $400 monthly salary limit and declined to field a team.

The Southwest Iowa League structured a 42–game schedule for each team. Each team was to have two home games at home and two road games each week. Ten percent of gate receipts were to go to the league. The remaining revenue was to be divided 60/40 between the home team and visitors. Home teams were to provide local umpires. The early 1903 season was greatly affected by rainy weather. After resuming play, Creston fielded team that played competitively against Shenandoah in two exhibition games outside of league play.

After beginning the 1903 season as a four–team league, the Southwest Iowa League expanded to a six–team league during the season. At a June 25, 1903 meeting, umpiring selection was taken over by the league, while the Creston Cyclones and a team from Osceola were selected to join the league as expansion teams. The Shenandoah, Iowa franchise folded on July 18, 1903, weeks after winning the Southwest Iowa League first half championship with a 13–5 record. Shenandoah had a 22–14 overall record. The Creston Cyclones franchise permanently folded on August 29, 1903, with a 24–19 overall record. The Atlantic, Iowa team won the second half title and had the 1903 Southwest Iowa League best record, finishing first with a 34–26 record, 3.5 games ahead of the second place Clarinda, Iowa team and 9.5 games ahead of the third place Red Oak Blue Indians.

The Southwest Iowa League permanently folded after the 1903 season and held no playoffs. On August 28, 1903, Red Oak had failed to appear to play at Atlantic and announced their intention to fold. Umpiring concerns, game protest disputes and financial struggles plagued the league and it permanently folded on August 29, 1903.

After the league had folded, the Creston Cyclones and Osceola teams desired to continue play. As a result, the two teams organized and played a winner-take-all post-season series, with a $1,500 purse going to the winner. Osceola defeated Creston in five consecutive games to win the series and the financial purse.

== 1903 Southwest Iowa League teams ==
Team name	Town represented	Stadium	Year(s) active
Atlantic	Atlantic, Iowa	Atlantic City Park	1903
Clarinda	Clarinda, Iowa	Clarinda Ballpark	1903
Creston Cyclones	Creston, Iowa	Unknown	1903
Osceola	Osceola, Iowa	Unknown	1903
Red Oak Blue Indians	Red Oak, Iowa	Legion Park	1903
Shenandoah	Shenandoah, Iowa	Sportsmans Park	1903

== 1903 Southwest Iowa League standings ==
Team standings	W	L	PCT	GB	Managers
Atlantic	34	26	.567	–	Fred Jarrott / W.E. Fulmer
Clarinda	31	30	.508	3½	Al Johnson / Guy Strickler / Depew
Red Oak Blue Indians	22	33	.400	9½	Crippen / Jimmy Deering
Osceola	18	29	.383	11	NA
Shenandoah	22	14	.611	NA	William Tiley
Creston Cyclones	24	19	.558	NA	John Corbett

Shenandoah won first half title. Atlantic won second half title.
Osceola and Creston joined for the second half June 29; Shenandoah disbanded July 18; Creston disbanded August 29. after season concluded Osceola defeated Creston 5 games to 0 in informal series
