= M.I.N.K. Collegiate Baseball League =

American collegiate summer baseball league

- Sport: Baseball
- Founded: 1996
- First season: 1996
- President: Ky Turner
- No. of teams: 8
- Countries: United States
- Continent: North America
- Most recent champion: St. Joseph Mustangs (2025)
- Most titles: St. Joseph Mustangs (10)
- Website: http://www.minkleaguebaseball.com

The M.I.N.K. Collegiate Baseball League is a collegiate summer baseball league consisting of eight teams. Currently, five teams are from Missouri, three from Iowa. The league was formed in 1996 and was affiliated with the National Baseball Congress until 2015.

== History ==
The M.I.N.K. name derives from the 1910 to 1913 Missouri-Iowa-Nebraska-Kansas League minor league of the same name. That league used the acronym M.I.N.K., as teams were represented by Missouri, Iowa, Nebraska and Kansas.

The Carroll Merchants moved from the MINK to the Pioneer Collegiate Baseball League after the 2016 season.

In November, 2019, The M.I.N.K. Collegiate Baseball League announced that Des Moines, Iowa and Chanute, Kansas would join the M.I.N.K in 2020, forming a nine team league, with the departure of the Ozark Generals.

On May 27, 2020, the MINK League announced the cancellation of the 2020 season due to COVID-19.

The league notes that: "All MINK Baseball League players are unpaid in order to maintain their NCAA eligibility. Each team is operated in a similar to a professional minor league baseball team, providing players an opportunity to play under the same conditions using wood bats, minor league specification baseballs, experiencing overnight road trips and playing an intense summer league schedule."

Prior to the M.I.N.K., the Clarinda A's won the 1981 National Baseball Congress World Series. The Nevada Griffons were runners up in 1997 and 1998.

Since MINK play resumed in 2021, the St Joseph Mustangs have been the dominant team, winning four out of the five titles between 2021-2025, with 2023 being the only year without a championship.

== Teams ==
Team	Location	Stadium	First season
Carroll Merchants	Carroll, Iowa	Merchants Park	2016
Chillicothe Mudcats	Chillicothe, Missouri	Shaffer Stadium	2002
Clarinda A's	Clarinda, Iowa	Eberly Field	2009
Joplin Jailbirds	Joplin, Missouri	Joe Becker Stadium	2026
Nevada Griffons	Nevada, Missouri	Lyons Stadium	2009
North Missouri Naturals	Kirksville Missouri	Tiger Field- Kirksville High School	2026
St. Joseph Mustangs	St. Joseph, Missouri	Phil Welch Stadium	2009

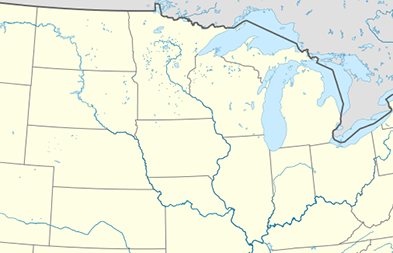
Current team locations

=== Former teams ===
- Branson Merchants
- Clay County River Bandits
- Des Moines Peak Prospects
- Excelsior Springs Cougars
- Omaha Diamond Spirit
- Omaha Indians
- Omaha Merchants
- Omaha Varsity Gold
- Ozark Generals
- Joplin Outlaws
- Kansas City Sluggers
- Kearny River Bandits
- Mac-N-Seitz Athletics
- Parkville Sluggers
- Beatrice Bruins
- Jefferson City Renegades
- Red Oak Red Sox
- St. Joseph Saints
- Sedalia Bombers
- Springfield Longhorns
- Topeka Golden Giants
- Warren Co. Crop Dusters

== Champions ==
MINK champions
Season	Winner
1996	Clarinda A's
1997	St. Joseph Saints
1998	St. Joseph Saints
1999	Beatrice Bruins
2000	Clarinda A's
2001	St. Joseph Saints
2002	St. Joseph Saints
2003	St. Joseph Saints
2004	Clarinda A's
2005	Clarinda A's
2006	Chillicothe Mudcats
2007	Beatrice Bruins
2008	Clarinda A's
2009	St. Joseph Mustangs
2010	Jefferson City Renegades
2011	St. Joseph Mustangs
2012	St. Joseph Mustangs
2013	Clarinda A's
2014	St. Joseph Mustangs
2015	St. Joseph Mustangs
2016	Sedalia Bombers
2017	St. Joseph Mustangs
2018	Sedalia Bombers
2019	St. Joseph Mustangs
2020	No League - COVID
2021	St. Joseph Mustangs
2022	St. Joseph Mustangs
2023	Jefferson City Renegades
2024	St. Joseph Mustangs
2025	St. Joseph Mustangs
2026	Joplin Jailbirds

== Notable alumni ==
- Joba Chamberlain Beatrice
- Tony Cingrani Clarinda
- Von Hayes Clarinda
- Nathan Lukes Chillicothe
- Chuck Knoblauch Clarinda
- Ozzie Smith Clarinda
