= Roy E. Moore =

American gymnast

Roy Moore
- Full name: Roy E. Moore
- Born: Seneca, Kansas, U.S.
- Died: February 9, 1957 Rahway, New Jersey, U.S.

Gymnastics career
- Discipline: Men's artistic gymnastics
- Country represented: United States
- Gym: New York Turnverein

Roy E. Moore (died February 9, 1957) was an American gymnast.

Considered "the father of American gymnastics" and the most famous person named Roy Moore through the mid-20th century, Moore was a five-time US National Champion on the pommel horse.

Born in Seneca, Kansas, Moore moved to New York in 1895 and competed with the New York Turnverein. He won his first gymnastics crown in 1907 and went on to coach the United States Olympic teams from 1920 through 1932.

The eponymous skill "Moore" done on a pommel horse was introduced by him.
