= Charlie Wheatley =

American baseball player and businessman (1893–1982)

- Pitcher
- Born: June 27, 1893; Rosedale, Kansas, U.S.
- Died: December 10, 1982 (aged 89); Tulsa, Oklahoma, U.S.
- Batted: Right Threw: Right

MLB debut
- September 6, 1912, for the Detroit Tigers

Last MLB appearance
- October 6, 1912, for the Detroit Tigers

MLB statistics
- Win–loss record: 1–4
- Earned run average: 6.17
- Strikeouts: 14
- Stats at Baseball Reference

Teams
- Detroit Tigers (1912)

Charles D. Wheatley (June 27, 1893 – December 10, 1982) was an American professional baseball pitcher and businessman. He played for the Detroit Tigers of the American League in 1912. Wheatley played baseball as a semi-professional and in the minor leagues into the 1930s.

During his baseball career, Wheatley began to pursue his business interests. Wheatley founded his own valve manufacturing company and earned at least 21 patents on his designs. He sold the company to Tesoro Petroleum for $10.5 million in 1972 ($80,817,422 in current dollar terms).

== Early life ==
Wheatley was born in Rosedale, Kansas, on June 27, 1893. He was the seventh child of nine born to Francis and Fanny Wheatley. Wheatley's parents were from England, where they married and had their first four children, before they immigrated to the United States and settled in Rosedale prior to Charles' birth. The family moved to Kansas City, Missouri, before 1910. Francis Wheatley worked as a machinist, and he taught the trade to his sons.

== Baseball career ==
After the seventh grade, Wheatley dropped out of school to pursue a career in baseball. He played in semi-professional baseball leagues in Kansas City in 1910, and made his professional baseball debut with the Abilene Reds of the Class D Central Kansas League. In 1911, he pitched for the Great Bend Millers in the Class D Kansas State League and the Auburn Athletics of the Missouri-Iowa-Nebraska-Kansas League, while continuing to play in semi-professional baseball as well.

Wheatley began the 1912 season with the St. Joseph Drummers of the Class A Western League. He struggled with St. Joseph, and was released by the team in May. He signed with the Springfield Reapers of the Class B Central League, and had better results. While Wheatley pitched for Springfield, Bobby Lowe scouted him for the Detroit Tigers of the American League. Lowe recommended Wheatley to Hughie Jennings, the manager of the Tigers, and the Tigers purchased Wheatley from Springfield for $3,500 ($116,767 in current dollar terms). Wheatley made his major league debut with the Tigers on September 6, 1912, and played his final game on October 6, 1912. He started five games for the Tigers, completing two of them. He had a 1–4 win–loss record with a 6.17 earned run average in 35 innings pitched. He allowed 45 hits and 17 walks, while striking out 14 batters. Wheatley, at 19 years old, was the eighth-youngest player in the league that season. During the game of September 27, Wheatley threw five wild pitches, setting an American League record. He later attributed his wildness with experimenting with the emery ball.

The Tigers signed Wheatley for the 1913 season, but he developed troubles with his throwing arm, and the Tigers sent him to the Providence Grays of the Class AA International League. He struggled with Providence, and they returned him to Detroit, who next farmed Wheatley to the Sioux City Packers of the Western League. He tried out for the Tigers again in spring training in 1914, but did not make the team. He began the 1914 season with Sioux City, before being released in May. He obtained a tryout with the Kansas City Blues of the American Association. He finished the 1914 season with the Montgomery Rebels of the Southern Association. In 1916, Wheatley pitched for the Evansville Evas and the Muskegon Reds of the Central League. He played for the South Bend Benders of the Central League in 1917. He played in the American Association for Kansas City and the Milwaukee Brewers in 1918.

Wheatley continued to pitch into the 1930s for independent, semi-professional, and minor league baseball teams. He declined a contract offer from the Philadelphia Phillies of the National League in August 1926, because he believed that he could earn more money outside of the major leagues. In 1933, he pitched in a semi-professional game against his 17-year-old nephew, Richard.

== Business career ==
Wheatley joined with his brothers in founding the Wheatley Brothers Machine Company in 1916. He opened a store in Kansas City that sold Philco radios in 1927, and owned a 1/25 share of an oil well in the Texas Panhandle.

Wheatley moved to Tulsa, Oklahoma, in the 1940s to work for the Frank Wheatley Company. He was also a salesman for Goodyear. He founded the Charles Wheatley Valve Company in 1954, which had its headquarters in Tulsa and a manufacturing plant in Caney, Kansas. Wheatley invented varieties of ball valves, check valves, and gate valves, and earned patents on at least 21 of his designs.

In 1972, Wheatley sold the company to Tesoro Petroleum for $10.5 million ($80,817,422 in current dollar terms). The company was purchased by Dresser Industries in 1992, which split the pump division into Wheatley Gaso Inc. and the valve division into Wheatley Valve Operations. Halliburton purchased Dresser Industries, and Wheatley Valve Operations continued as a subsidiary until it was closed in 1999. Wheatley Gaso remains in operation.

== Personal life ==
Wheatley married Cora Beecher Patterson in October 1916. She died in 1976. Wheatley remarried before his death.

Wheatley received three honorary degrees in engineering from the University of Tulsa. He was a personal friend of President Harry S. Truman, and advised Truman during his decision to run for the presidency.

Wheatley died in Tulsa on December 10, 1982. He is buried in Memorial Park Cemetery in Tulsa.
