= Creston Cyclones =

- 1903; Creston, Iowa

Minor league affiliations
- Class: Class D (1903)
- League: Southwest Iowa League (1903)

Major league affiliations
- Team: None

Minor league titles
- League titles: None

Team data
- Name: Creston Cyclones (1903)
- Ballpark: Unknown (1903)

The Creston Cyclones were a minor league baseball team based in Creston, Iowa. In 1903, the Cyclones played as members of the short–lived Class D level Southwest Iowa League, joining the league in mid–season as an expansion team. The "Cyclones" moniker corresponds to a tornado that struck Creston, Iowa in May 1903.

== History ==
The 1903 Creston Cyclones were the only minor league baseball team based in Creston, Iowa. The Cyclones played as members of the six–team Class D level Southwest Iowa League, along with Atlantic, Clarinda, Osceola, Iowa the Red Oak Blue Indians and Shenandoah, with the league beginning play on May 29, 1903 without Creston. On June 29, 1903, Creston and the Osceola team joined the Southwest Iowa League, which had begun play as a four–team league.

The team's "Cyclones" moniker corresponds to a tornado that struck Creston, Iowa on May 26, 1903. One person was killed and many injured in the tornado, that also badly damaged several homes, businesses and a church.

On March 25, 1903, the Southwest Iowa League was formed at a meeting and E.H. Whiteside, of Atlantic, Iowa elected league president. Creston, Iowa representatives were concerned about the league's $400 monthly salary limit and declined to field a team for the upcoming season. The league began play with four Iowa teams in Atlantic, Clarinda, Shenandoah and Red Oak as the charter member franchises. The league disallowed playing games on Sundays.

After the Southwest Iowa League opened league play, a Creston independent team had formed and played numerous exhibition games against league member teams. Because of their positive play, Creston had renewed interest in joining the Southwest Iowa League. At a June 25, 1903 Southwest Iowa League meeting, Creston was awarded an immediate membership in the league. Osceola also was awarded a team, with the two new franchises expanding the league to six teams. After beginning league play, Atlantic protested an August 15, 1903 game against Creston due to umpiring.

Beginning play in the Southwest Iowa League on June 29, 1903, Creston was competitive, but the league was unable to complete the season. The Creston Cyclones had a 24–19 record when the league folded on August 29, 1903. The Creston manager was Jack Corbett, as the Cyclones ended the season in third place overall, finishing 2.0 games behind first place Shenandoah.

Creston has not hosted another minor league team.

== The ballpark ==
The name of the Creston home minor league ballpark is not directly referenced. It is known that Creston played games against Osceola in the neutral town of Afton, Iowa.

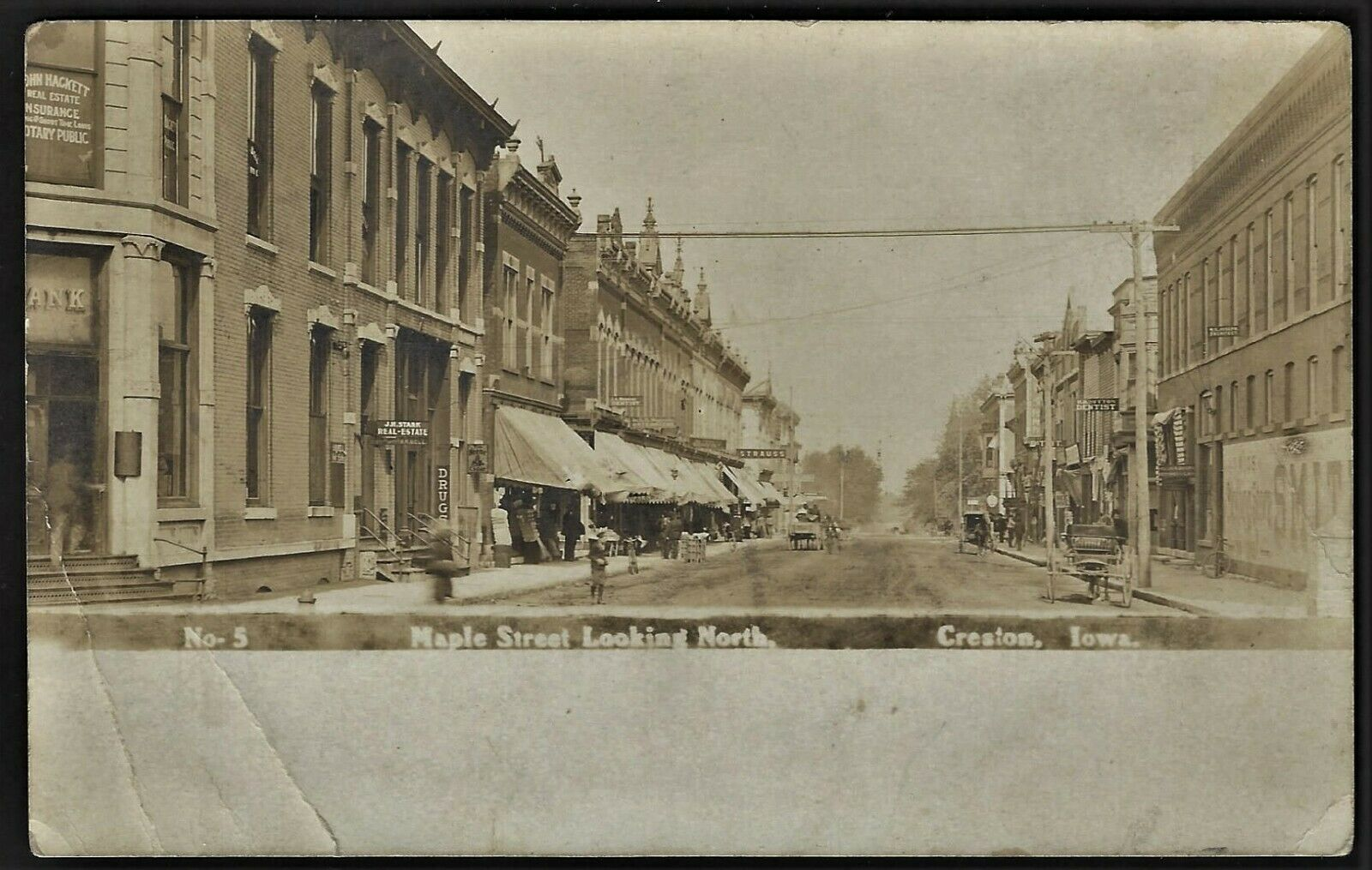
Creston Iowa (1908)

== Year–by–year record ==
Year	Record	Finish	Manager	Playoffs/Notes
1903	24–19	3rd	Jack Corbett	League folded August 29

== Notable alumni ==
- The player roster for the Creston Cyclones is unknown.
