= Ted McGrew =

American baseball player, manager, umpire, and scout

- Born: June 24, 1880; Indianapolis, Indiana, U.S.
- Died: June 29, 1969 (aged 89); Bedford, Virginia, U.S.

Career highlights and awards
- Discovered Pee Wee Reese; Discovered Alvin Dark; Behind the plate for Dizzy Dean's NL single-game strikeout record

Harry Hancock "Ted" McGrew (June 24, 1880 – June 29, 1969) was an American professional baseball player, manager, umpire and scout. After a minor league playing and managing career, he umpired in Major League Baseball (MLB) in 1930, 1931, 1933 and 1934. Later in his life, McGrew scouted for several MLB teams and was credited with discovering Pee Wee Reese and Alvin Dark.

== Biography ==
McGrew was born in Indianapolis, Indiana, on June 24, 1880. He was a minor league infielder (playing in his native Midwest) and manager before beginning his umpiring career. By 1929, McGrew was umpiring in the American Association and calling exhibition games for the Pittsburgh Pirates. He spent 1930 and 1931 umpiring in the National League. He umpired in the International League in 1932. McGrew returned to the majors in 1933 and was behind the plate when Dizzy Dean set a National League single-game strikeout record. McGrew requested voluntary retirement in December of that year.

In his later life, McGrew was a longtime major league scout. While with the Brooklyn Dodgers, he was responsible for the signing of Pee Wee Reese. He also signed Claude Osteen, who became a three-time All-Star with the Dodgers. McGrew was hired as the chief scout for the Philadelphia Phillies in 1943. He later scouted for the Boston Braves, where he signed Alvin Dark in 1946. He was hired as chief scout for the Pittsburgh Pirates in 1949; he supervised a scouting corps that included Lloyd Waner, Babe Herman and Pie Traynor. He joined the scouting staff of the Boston Red Sox the next year.

While McGrew was a scout, Brooklyn player Babe Dahlgren became surrounded by rumors of marijuana use which may have led to a series of trades involving Dahlgren. The rumors began with manager Joe McCarthy of the Yankees, who traded Dahlgren to Brooklyn in 1940. Before the 1943 season, Dodgers general manager Branch Rickey traded Dahlgren to Philadelphia. McGrew was present at a meeting where Rickey said he had traded Dahlgren due to marijuana use. McGrew was hired as the chief scout in Philadelphia later that year, and Philadelphia sent Dahlgren to Pittsburgh two months later.

McGrew died in Bedford, Virginia, on June 29, 1969.
