= Red Oak Blue Indians =

- 1903; Red Oak, Iowa

Minor league affiliations
- Class: Class D (1903)
- League: Southwest Iowa League (1903)

Major league affiliations
- Team: None

Minor league titles
- League titles (0): None

Team data
- Name: Red Oak Blue Indians (1903)
- Ballpark: Legion Park (1903)

The Red Oak Blue Indians were a minor league baseball team based in Red Oak, Iowa. In 1903, the Blue Indians played as members of the Class D level Southwest Iowa League, hosting minor league home games at Legion Park.

== History ==
The 1903 Red Oak "Blue Indians" were the first minor league baseball team in Red Oak, Iowa. The Blue Indians played as charter members of the six–team 1903 Southwest Iowa League. The teams from Atlantic, Clarinda, the Creston Cyclones, Osceola, Iowa and Shenandoah joined Red Oak in the new league. The Southwest Iowa League began 1903 play with four teams. On June 29, 1903, the league expanded to six teams when the Creston Cyclones and the Osceola, Iowa teams joined the league.

On March 25, 1903, the Southwest Iowa League was formed at a meeting held at the Hotel Johnson in Red Oak, Iowa. E.H. Whiteside, of Atlantic, Iowa was elected league president. Atlantic, Clarinda, Iowa, Shenandoah and Red Oak were chosen as the four charter member franchises. The league decided to disallow playing games on Sundays. The initial four towns had similar populations (3,000 to 5,000) and the longest distance to travel was less than sixty miles, which was designed to keep travel expenses to a minimum.

Red Oak Blue Indians opened league play on May 19, 1903, with Atlantic hosting Red Oak. Atlantic won the season opener by the score of 10–5. After the opening day game, rains postponed play until May 26, 1903. Red Oak had to move their opener to a golf course due to unplayable field conditions. There were 250 fans on hand at the temporary ballpark. As the season progressed and attendance became an issue, Red Oak experimented with a later 6:00 PM. starting time to allow more fans to attend. But, each time the evening starting time was tried, it became dark before a full nine innings were played.

On August 28, 1903, the Red Oak Blue Indians team failed to appear for their series at Atlantic on. The franchise then announced its intention fold from the league. The Southwest Iowa League folded on August 29, 1903. At the time the league folded, Red Oak had an overall record of 22–33 record, placing third overall in the Southwest Iowa League. Crippen and Jimmy Deering were the Red Oak managers. The Red Oak Blue Indians finished 9.5 games behind the champion Atlantic in the six–team league. Atlantic (34–26) and Clarinda (31–30) finished ahead of Red Oak in the overall standings. The Southwest Iowa League permanently folded after their only season in 1903.

Red Oak, Iowa has not hosted another minor league team.

== The ballpark ==
The Red Oak Blue Indians hosted minor league home games at the Legion Park. Legion Park is still in use today as a public park and is located at North Broadway & Alix Street in Red Oak, Iowa.

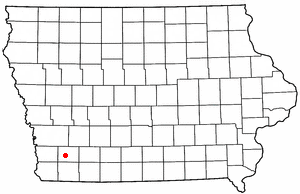
Red Oak, Iowa location

== Year–by–year record ==
Year	Record	Finish	Manager	Playoffs/Notes
1903	22–33	3rd	Crippen / Jimmy Deering	Did not qualify

== Notable alumni ==
- The 1903 Red Oak Blue Indians' player roster is unknown.
