= Marysville (baseball) =

- 1910; Marysville, Kansas

Minor league affiliations
- Class: Class D (1910)
- League: Eastern Kansas League (1910)

Major league affiliations
- Team: None

Minor league titles
- League titles (0): None

Team data
- Name: Marysville (1910)
- Ballpark: High School Field (1910)

The Marysville baseball team was a minor league baseball team based in Marysville, Kansas. In 1910, Marysville played as members of the Class D level Eastern Kansas League, finishing in fourth place. The team had no formal team moniker, common in the era. The 1910 season was the only season of play for both the league and the Marysville team. Marysville hosted minor league home games at the Marysville High School Field.

== History ==
The 1910 Marysville team first brought minor league baseball to Marysville, Kansas. Marysville played as charter members of the 1910 Class D level, six–team Eastern Kansas League. The Hiawatha Athletics, Holton, Kansas, Horton, Kansas, Seneca and Sabetha (baseball) Sabetha, Kansas teams joined Marysville as Eastern Kansas League charter members. Marysville played without a formal team moniker.

After completing 1910 league play, the Marysville team finished the season with an overall record of 38–39. The team finished in fourth place in the Eastern Kansas League standings, playing under managers William Davidson and McDowell. The team had a record of 30–25 under William Davidson and 8–14 under McDowell. Maysville finished 13.0 games behind the first place Sabetha team in the six–team league final standings. The Eastern Kansas League permanently folded after their only season of 1910.

The final 1910 Eastern Kansas League standings were led by Sabetha, who ended the season with a 53–28 record, followed by Seneca (46–39), Hiawatha Indians (44–44), Marysville (38–39), Horton (35–38) and Holton / Blue Rapids (26–54). The Eastern Kansas League permanently folded after their only season of 1910.

Marysville, Kansas has not hosted another minor league team.

== The ballpark ==
The 1910 Marysville team was noted to have played minor league home games at Marysville High School Field. The ballpark was reportedly located at Walnut Street & 10th Streets in Maysville, Kansas.

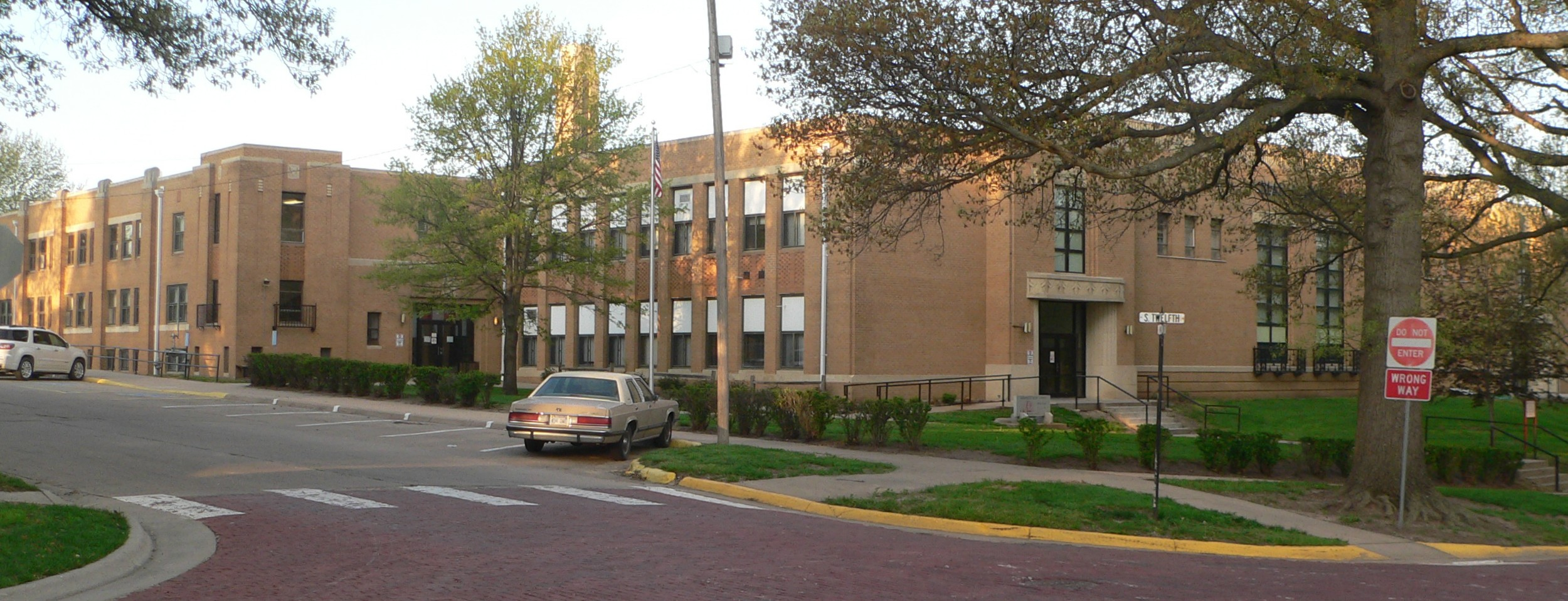
(2015) Marysville High school. Marysville, Kansas

== Year–by–year records ==
Year	Record	Finish	Managers	Playoffs/Notes
1910	38–39	4th	William Davidson / McDowell	None held

== Notable alumni ==
- The roster information for the 1910 Marysville team in unknown.
