= Falls City Colts =

- 1910–1913; Falls City, Nebraska

Minor league affiliations
- Class: Class D (1910–1913)
- League: Missouri-Iowa-Nebraska-Kansas League (1910–1913)

Major league affiliations
- Team: None

Minor league titles
- League titles (1): 1910

Team data
- Name: Falls City Colts (1910–1913)
- Ballpark: Athletic Field (1910, 1913); Athletic Park (1913)

The Falls City Colts were a minor league baseball franchise based in Falls City, Nebraska. From 1910 to 1913, the Colts played exclusively as members of the Class D level Missouri-Iowa-Nebraska-Kansas League, winning the 1910 league championship and placing second in 1911 and 1912. Falls City hosted home minor league games at the Athletic Park.

== History ==
In 1910, Falls City first fielded a minor league team., when the Falls City Colts were formed and became charter members of the six–team Missouri-Illinois-Nebraska-Kansas League, known informally as the MINK League. Falls City was joined in the Class D level league by the Auburn Athletics, Clarinda Antelopes, Maryville Comets, Nebraska City Forresters and Shenandoah Pin Rollers teams as charter members.

The Falls City Colts franchise was formed and reportedly built their roster when the franchise purchased 14 players from the salaried Atchison team at the price of $50.00. The local newspaper, the Falls City Journal, urged the town residents to support the Colts in their initial season. Seating was erected at Athletic Park under the direction of Milt Bohrer. The grandstand had seating for 500 and bleachers along both baselines increased the capacity to more than 1,000. On opening day, May 19, 1910, forty local Falls City businesses closed early and schools dismissed early. Falls City Mayor Keeling threw out the ceremonial first pitch with 1,101 fans in attendance. The Colts defeated the Nebraska City Forresters 3–0 to win the home opener.

In their first season, the 1910 Falls City Colts won the Missouri-Illinois-Nebraska-Kansas League championship. In June, the Colts played a 17–inning game against Nebraska City. The game ended due darkness with the score tied 0–0. On July 4, 1910 the Colts drew 1,119 for a doubleheader against the Maryville Comets. The Colts finished the 1910 season with a record of 57–40, placing first in the Missouri-Illinois-Nebraska-Kansas League standings, winning the championship as the league did not have playoffs for its duration. The Colts finished 1.5 games ahead of the second place Clarinda Antelopes. The 1910 Foresters were managed by Bill Annis. Playing home games at Athletic Park, Falls City had total season attendance of 14,205 an average of 293 fans per game.

Continuing play in 1911, the Falls City Colts placed second in the Missouri-Illinois-Nebraska-Kansas League final standings. The Colts ended the 1911 season with a record of 57–43, finishing 2.0 games behind the first place Maryville Comets/Humboldt Infants. Jack Forrester was the 1911 Colts player/manager.

In 1912, Falls City placed second in the six–team Missouri-Illinois-Nebraska-Kansas League standings after a championship battle with the Nebraska City Forresters. The Colts, managed by Tony Vanderhill, ended the 1912 season with a record of 61–41, finishing 1.5 games behind Nebraska City who finished 61–38. During the season. Falls City was in 1st place for most of June and July. On the 4th of July, Ed Finch of Falls City threw a no–hitter against the Hiawatha Indians in a 7–0 victory.

In their final season, the 1913 Falls City Colts folded, which resulted in the rest of the Missouri-Illinois-Nebraska-Kansas League permanently folding. Nebraska Sunday laws of the era were a factor impacting the success of the league. In 1913, Falls City moved Sunday home games to Kansas in an effort to avoid the restrictive laws in Nebraska. On June 17, 1913, the Falls City Colts and Humboldt Infants franchises both disbanded, causing the four–team MINK league to collapse. The Falls City ended their final of the Missouri-Illinois-Nebraska-Kansas League season with a record of 13–19 and were in third place when the league folded. Ira Bidwell served as manager, as the Colts were 11.0 games behind the first place Auburn Athletics.

Falls City has not hosted another minor league franchise.

== The ballpark ==
The Falls City Colts were noted to have played minor league home games at the Athletic Park in Falls City. The ballpark was located adjacent to the auditorium in City Park at West 17th Street & Barada Street, Falls City, Nebraska. In 1913, Falls City moved Sunday home games to Kansas to avoid Sunday Law restrictions in Nebraska. It is possible the 1913 Kansas games were played at League Park in nearby Hiawatha, Kansas, which had been home to the MINK league member Hiawatha Athletics in 1912.

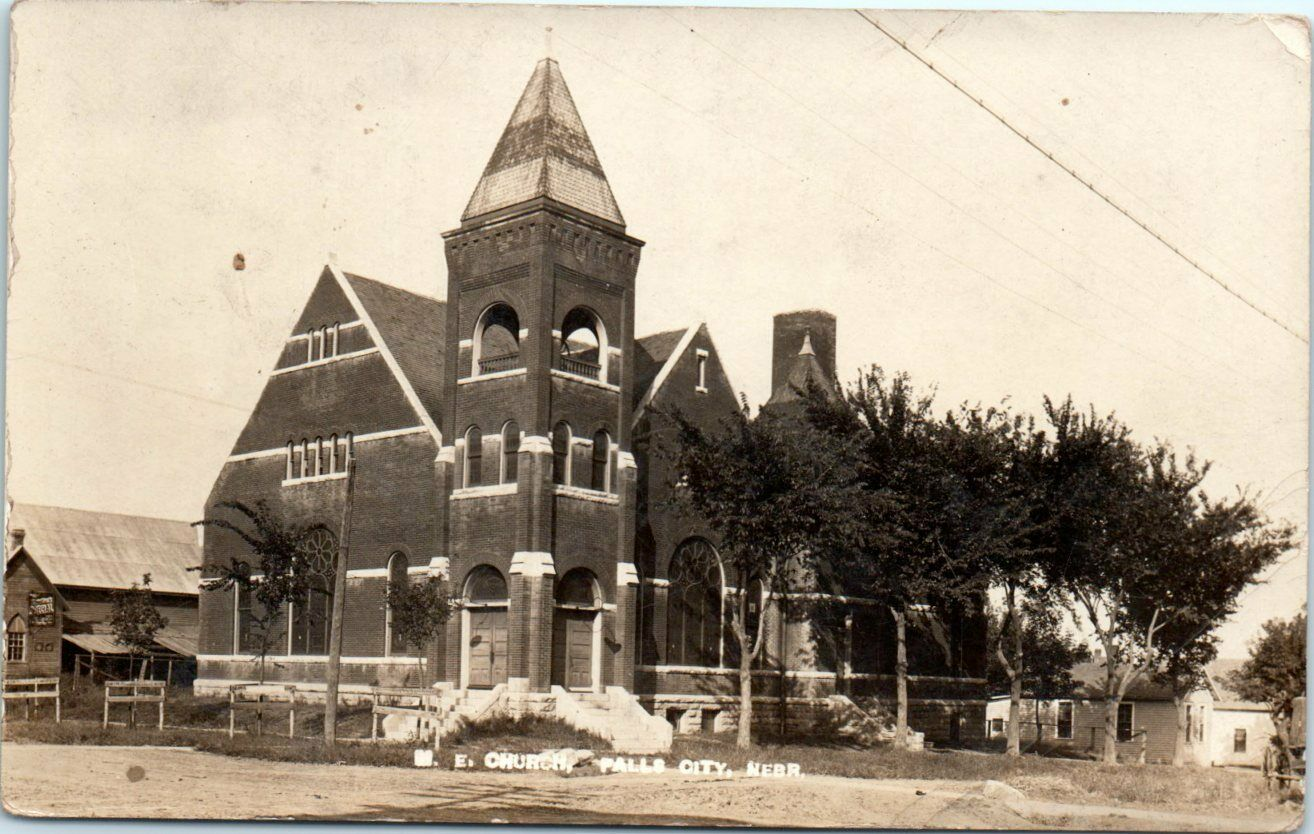
(1915) Falls City, Nebraska

== Timeline ==
Year(s)	# Yrs.	Team	Level	League	Ballpark
1910–1913	4	Falls City Colts	Class D	Missouri-Iowa-Nebraska-Kansas League	Athletic Park

== Year–by–year records ==
Year	Record	Finish	Manager	Playoffs/Notes
1910	57–40	1st	Bill Annis	League champions
1911	57–43	2nd	Jack Forrester	No playoffs held
1912	61–41	2nd	Tony Vanderhill	No playoffs held
1913	13–19	3rd	Ira Bidwell	League Folded June 17

== Notable alumni ==
- Bill Annis (1910, MGR)
- Bill Kemmer (1910)
- Ray Miller (1910)
- Charles Ward (1912)
- Falls City Colts players
