= Atlantic (Iowa baseball) =

- 1903; Atlantic, Iowa

Minor league affiliations
- Class: Class D (1903)
- League: Southwest Iowa League (1903)

Major league affiliations
- Team: None

Minor league titles
- League titles (1): 1903

Team data
- Name: Atlantic (1903)
- Ballpark: Atlantic City Park (1903)

The Atlantic team was a minor league baseball team based in Atlantic, Iowa. In 1903, the Atlantic team played as members of the Class D level Southwest Iowa League, winning the league championship in their only season of play. Atlantic was without a known nickname, hosting minor league home games at the Atlantic City Park.

== History ==
Atlantic, Iowa first hosted minor league baseball when the "Atlantic" team became members of the Southwest Iowa League, which began play on May 29, 1903. Atlantic would win the championship of the short–lived league. The Southwest Iowa League was established at a January 26, 1903, meeting held in Shenandoah, Iowa where a board of directors was established. Original plans called for an eight–team league, with clubs to be formed among several interested Iowa towns and two Nebraska cities: Nebraska City and Plattsmouth. At the January 26 meeting, it was established that interested cities needed to apply for membership and provide a $100 application fee.

On March 25, 1903, the new league was formalized at a meeting held at the Hotel Johnson in Red Oak, Iowa. The new league was officially named the "Southwest Iowa League" and E.H. Whiteside, of Atlantic, Iowa was elected president. At the conclusion of the meeting, Four Iowa teams in Atlantic, Clarinda, Iowa, Shenandoah and Red Oak were ultimately chosen as the charter member franchises. Council Bluffs, Iowa and Nebraska City were originally selected for membership, but backed out when it was decided to disallow playing games on Sunday. Glenwood, Iowa and Malvern, Iowa could not raise the application fees. Creston, Iowa was concerned about the league's $400 monthly salary limit and declined to field a team.

The Atlantic team played under managers Fred Jarrott and W.E. Fulmer. The Southwest Iowa League was a Class D level league and teams were structured to play a 42–game season schedule, with two home games at home and two road games each week. Ten percent of gate receipts were to go to the league. The remaining revenue was to be divided 60/40 between the home team and visitors. Home teams were to provide local umpires. The early 1903 season was greatly affected by rainy weather. After resuming play, Creston fielded team that played competitively against Shenandoah in two exhibition games outside of league play.

After beginning the 1903 season as a four–team league, the Southwest Iowa League expanded to a six–team league during the season. At a June 25, 1903 meeting, umpiring selection was taken over by the league, while the Creston Cyclones and a team from Osceola, Iowa were selected to join the league as expansion teams. However, as the league continued play, the Shenandoah, Iowa franchise folded on July 18, 1903, weeks after winning the Southwest Iowa League first half championship with a 13–5 record. Shenandoah had a 22–14 overall record at the time they folded. During the season, Atlantic protested an August 15 game against Creston due to umpiring. The newly formed Creston Cyclones franchise permanently folded on August 29, 1903, with a 24–19 overall record. Atlantic won the second half title and had the 1903 Southwest Iowa League's best overall record, placing first with a 34–26 record, finishing 3.5 games ahead of the second place Clarinda team and 9.5 games ahead of the third place Red Oak Blue Indians.

The Southwest Iowa League permanently folded after the 1903 regular season and had no playoffs. On August 28, 1903, Red Oak had failed to appear to play a game at Atlantic and announced their intention to fold. Umpiring concerns, game protest disputes and financial struggles plagued the league and it permanently folded on August 29, 1903.

Atlantic, Iowa has not hosted another minor league team.

== The ballpark ==
The Atlantic team played 1903 minor league home games at the Atlantic City Park. City Park is still in use today as a public park. The location is 10 West 7th Street in Atlantic, Iowa.

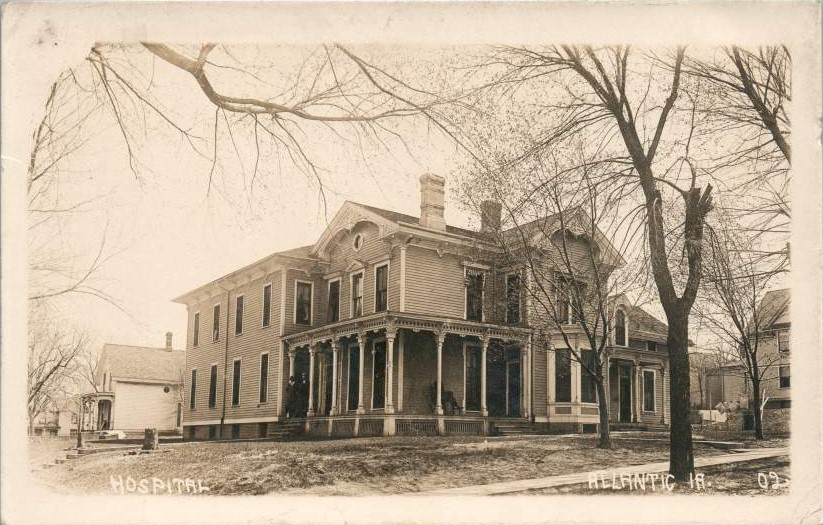
(1914) Atlantic, Iowa

== Timeline ==
Year(s)	# Yrs.	Team	Level	League
1903	1	Atlantic	Class D	Southwest Iowa League

== Year–by–year records ==
Year	Record	Finish	Manager	Playoffs/Notes
1903	34–26	1st	Fred Jarrott / W.E Fulmer	League champions

== Notable alumni ==
- Exact roster information for the 1903 Atlantic team is unknown.
