= Clarinda Antelopes =

- 1903–1911; (1903, 1910–1911); Clarinda, Iowa

Minor league affiliations
- Class: Class D (1903, 1910–1911)
- League: Southwest Iowa League (1903); Missouri-Iowa-Nebraska-Kansas League (1910–1911)

Major league affiliations
- Team: None

Minor league titles
- League titles (0): None

Team data
- Name: Clarinda (1903); Clarinda Antelopes (1910–1911)
- Ballpark: Clarinda Ball Park (1903, 1910–1911)

The Clarinda Antelopes were a minor league baseball team based in Clarinda, Iowa. Clarinda played as members of the Class D level Southwest Iowa League in 1903 and the Missouri-Iowa-Nebraska-Kansas League in 1910 and 1911, hosting home games at the Clarinda Ball Park.

== History ==
Minor league baseball began in Clarinda, Iowa in 1903. The Clarinda team played as charter members of the six–team Class D level Southwest Iowa League. The teams from Atlantic, the Creston Cyclones, the Osceola, Iowa team, the Red Oak Blue Indians and Shenandoah joined Clarinda in league play. Clarinda finished their first season of play with a record of 31–30, placing second in the Southwest Iowa League standings under managers Al Johnson, Guy Strickler and Depew. Clarinda finished 3.5 games behind the first place Atlantic team in the league standings. The Southwest Iowa League permanently folded after their only season in 1903.

Minor league baseball returned to Clarinda in 1910. The 1910 Clarinda "Antelopes" began play as charter members of the Class D level Missouri-Iowa-Nebraska-Kansas League, known informally as the MINK League. Clarinda finished the 1910 season with a record of 56–42, placing second in the MINK standings, 1.5 games behind the champion Falls City Colts. The Antelopes played under manager Rudy Kling Playing home games at the Clarinda Ball Park, season attendance was 12,736, an average of 260 per game.

In their final season, the Clarinda Antelopes placed fifth in 1911 Missouri-Illinois-Nebraska- Kansas League standings. The Antelopes ended the season with a 43–57 record under manager Frank Hutchinson, finishing 16.0 games behind the first place Maryville Comets/Humboldt Infants. The Clarinda franchise folded after the season.

Clarinda, Iowa has not hosted another minor league franchise.

Today, Clarinda is home to the Clarinda A's, a collegiate summer baseball team, who play as members of the M.I.N.K. Collegiate Baseball League. Baseball Hall of Fame member Ozzie Smith played for the Clarinda A's.

== The ballpark ==
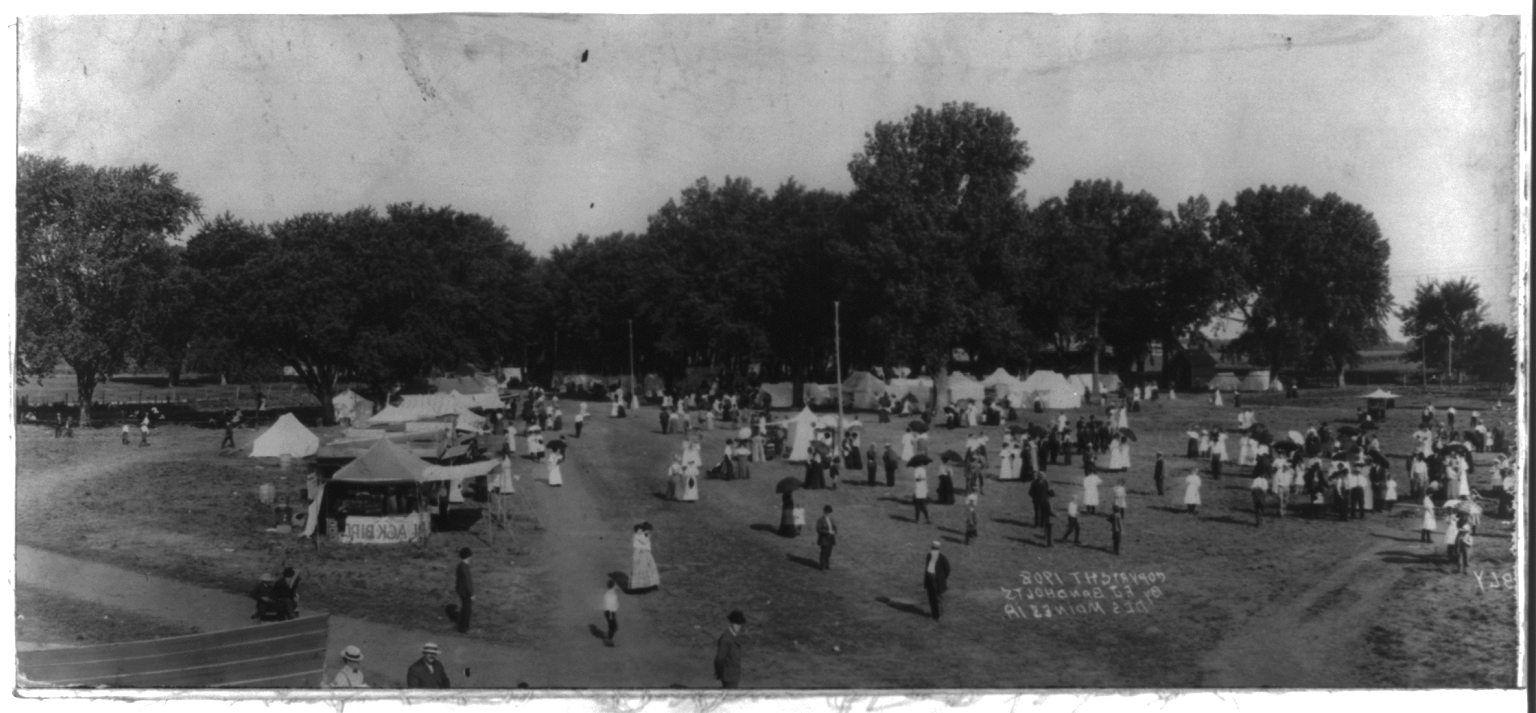
(1908) Chautauqua Assembly, Clarinda, Iowa.

The Clarinda and Clarinda Antelope minor league teams hosted home games at the Clarinda Ball Park. The name corresponds to Clarinda City Park. Still in use today as a public park with four ballfields, Clarinda City Park is located at 1140 East Main Street, Clarinda, Iowa.

== Timeline ==
| Year(s) | # Yrs. | Team | Level | League | Ballpark |
|---|---|---|---|---|---|
| 1903 | 1 | Clarinda | Class D | Southwest Iowa League | Clarinda Ball Park |
| 1910–1911 | 2 | Clarinda Anetlopes | Class D | Missouri-Iowa-Nebraska-Kansas League | Clarinda Ball Park |

== Year–by–year records ==
| Year | Record | Finish | Manager | Playoffs/Notes |
|---|---|---|---|---|
| 1903 | 31–30 | 2nd | Al Johnson; Guy Strickler / Depew | No playoffs held |
| 1910 | 56–42 | 2nd | Rudy Kling | No playoffs held |
| 1911 | 43–57 | 5th | Frank Hutchinson | No playoffs held |

== Notable alumni ==
- Rudy Kling (1910, MGR)
- Clarinda Antelopes players
