= Rudy Kling =

American baseball player (1870–1937)

- Shortstop
- Born: March 23, 1870; St. Louis, Missouri, U.S.
- Died: March 14, 1937 (aged 66); St. Louis, Missouri, U.S.
- Batted: Right Threw: Right

MLB debut
- September 21, 1902, for the St. Louis Cardinals

Last MLB appearance
- September 26, 1902, for the St. Louis Cardinals

MLB statistics
- Batting average: .200
- Home runs: 0
- Runs batted in: 0
- Stats at Baseball Reference

Teams
- St. Louis Cardinals (1902)

Rudolph A. Kling (March 23, 1870 – March 14, 1937) was an American professional baseball player who played shortstop in the Major Leagues for the St. Louis Cardinals in 1902.
