= Seneca (baseball) =

- 1910; Seneca, Kansas

Minor league affiliations
- Class: Class D (1910)
- League: Eastern Kansas League (1910)

Major league affiliations
- Team: None

Minor league titles
- League titles (0): None

Team data
- Name: Seneca (1910)
- Ballpark: City Park (1910)

The Seneca baseball team was a minor league baseball team based in Seneca, Kansas. In 1910, playing with no known nickname, the Seneca team played the season as members of the Class D level Eastern Kansas League, hosting home games at City Park. Seneca finished in second place, as the Eastern Kansas League folded following their only season of minor league play.

== History ==
The 1910 the Seneca team first brought minor league baseball to Seneca, Kansas. The Seneca team played as charter members of the 1910 Class D level, six–team Eastern Kansas League. Other league members beginning the season were the Hiawatha Athletics, Holton, Kansas, Horton, Kansas, Marysville, Kansas, and Sabetha, Kansas. Holton, with a 15–31 record, moved to Blue Rapids on August 25, 1910.

Seneca began Eastern Kansas League play on June 8, 1910. After joining 1910 league play, the Seneca team finished their 1910 season with an overall record of 46–39. The team finished in second place in the Eastern Kansas League standings, playing under managers Mike Simon and Tom Carmen. Seneca finished 9.0 games behind the first place Sabetha team in the six–team league final standings. No league playoffs were held.

The final 1910 Eastern Kansas League standings were led by Sabetha, who ended the season with a 53–28 record, followed by Seneca (46–39), Hiawatha Indians (44–44), Marysville (38–39), Horton (35–38) and Holton / Blue Rapids (26–54). The Eastern Kansas League did not return to play after completing their only season of 1910.

The Eastern Kansas League permanently folded after their only season of 1910, despite meetings and expansion talk about a 1911 Eastern Kansas League. Seneca has not hosted another minor league team.

== The ballpark ==
The Seneca team played home games at City Park. Today, the park is still in use as a public park, located at North 11th Street & Elk Street in Seneca, Kansas.

(1982) Storefronts, Seneca, Kansas.

== Timeline ==
Year(s)	# Yrs.	Team	Level	League	Ballpark
1910	1	Seneca	Class D	Eastern Kansas League	City Park

== Year–by–year record ==
Year	Record	Finish	Manager	Playoffs/Notes
1910	46–39	2nd	Mike Simon / Tom Carmen	No playoffs held

== Notable alumni ==
- The exact roster information for the 1910 Seneca team is unknown.
