= Humboldt Infants =

- 1911–1913; Humboldt, Nebraska

Minor league affiliations
- Class: Class D (1911–1913)
- League: Missouri-Iowa-Nebraska-Kansas League (1911–1913)

Major league affiliations
- Team: None

Minor league titles
- League titles (1): 1911

Team data
- Name: Humboldt Infants (1911–1913)
- Ballpark: Humboldt Lake Park (1911–1913)

The Humboldt Infants were a minor league baseball team based in Humboldt, Nebraska. From 1911 to 1913, the Infants played exclusively as members of the Class D level Missouri-Iowa-Nebraska-Kansas League, winning the 1911 league championship. Humboldt hosted home minor league games at Humboldt Lake Park.

== History ==
In their first season, the Humboldt Infants began play in mid–season and won the 1911 Missouri-Illinois-Nebraska-Kansas League championship. The Class D level league was nicknamed the "MINK" League. On July 10, 1911, the Maryville Comets had a 24–21 record when the franchise relocated to Humboldt, Nebraska, finishing the 1911 season as the "Humboldt Infants".

L.J. Segrist was a key figure in bringing the team to Humboldt, where the 1911 team won the league championship. There are differing accounts of the 1911 team moniker, which were often informal in the era. The Humboldt Standard and the Falls City Journal newspapers called the Humboldt team the "Orphans," while other references called them the "Infants". On July 17, 1911, Humboldt played their first home MINK league game in Humboldt as C.E. Nims threw out the first pitch and the Humboldt band played. The team won 5 out of 6 games in the first week of August, moving into first place. Maryville/Humboldt finished the 1911 season with a 59–41 overall record, playing the season under managers Harry Sievers and A.F. Bridges, while finishing 2.0 games ahead of the second place Falls City Colts in the six–team league. The MINK League did not hold playoffs. After the season, the city of Humboldt held a championship celebration in the town square that lasted "most of the night."

The Humboldt Infants continued play in the 1912 six–team MINK League. Humboldt finished the season with a 44–57 record. The Infants placed fourth under manager Ira Plank, finishing 18.0 games behind the first place Nebraska City Forresters in the Missouri-Illinois-Nebraska-Kansas League final standings. The issue of Nebraska Sunday laws affected baseball teams in the MINK League, as teams were not allowed to play Sunday games or practice.

In 1913 the Missouri-Illinois-Nebraska-Kansas League began play as a four–team league and Humboldt folded during the season. On June 17, 1913, both the Falls City Colts and Humboldt Infants franchises folded. As a result, the entire MINK League permanently folded. At the time, Humboldt was 12.0 games behind the first place Auburn Athletics. The Infants had a 12–20 final record and were in fourth place under manager Warren Cummings. The Sunday laws were cited as a financial factor in causing the league to fold.

Humboldt, Nebraska has not hosted another minor league team.

== The ballpark ==
The Humboldt Infants played minor league home games at Humboldt Lake Park. The ballpark was located on Park Avenue near Railroad Street in Humboldt, Nebraska. The park is still in use today as a public park.

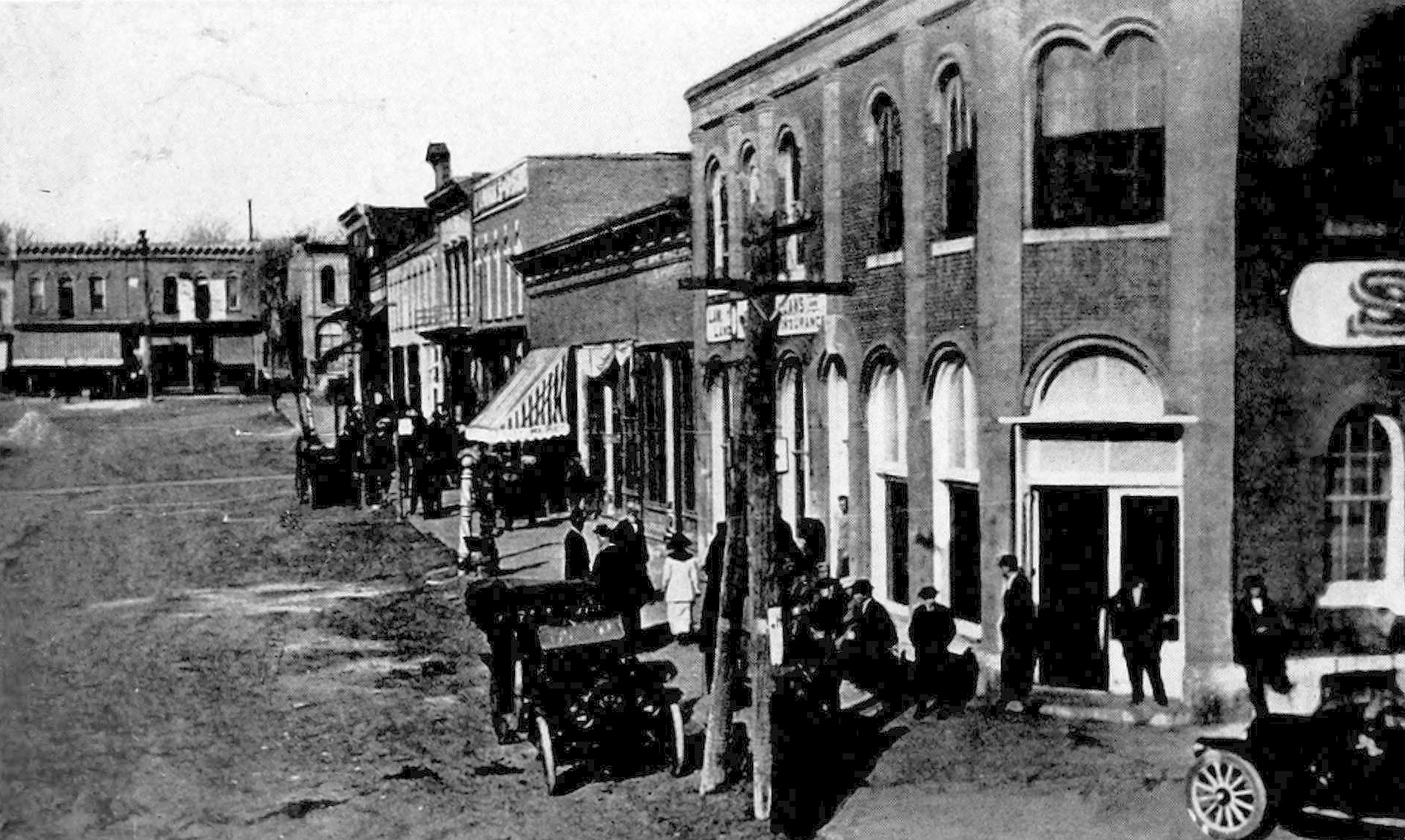
Humboldt, Nebraska (1917)

== Timeline ==
Year(s)	# Yrs.	Team	Level	League	Ballpark
1911–1913	3	Humboldt Infants	Class D	Missouri-Iowa-Nebraska-Kansas League	Humboldt Lake Park

== Year–by–year records ==
Year	Record	Finish	Manager	Playoffs/Notes
1911	59–41	1st	Harry Sievers / A.F. Bridges	July 10 Maryville moved to Humboldt (24–21); League champions
1912	44–57	4th	Ira Plank	No playoffs held
1913	12–20	4th	Warren Cummings	League folded July 17

== Notable alumni ==
No Humboldt alumni reached the major leagues.
