= Franklin Pierce Buyer =

American politician

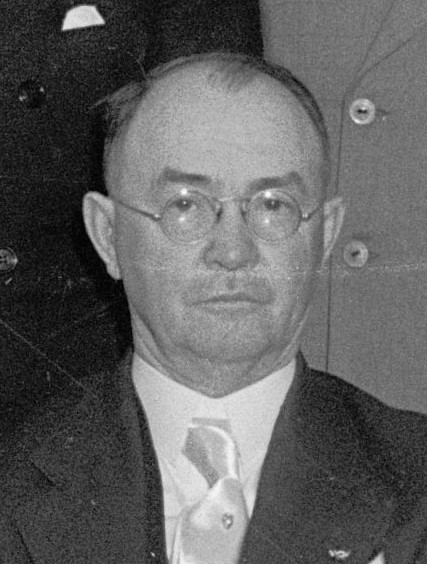
- Buyer in 1935

Member of the Los Angeles City Council from the 15th district
- In office July 1, 1933 – June 30, 1939
- Preceded by: A. E. Henning
- Succeeded by: Wilder W. Hartley

Personal details
- Born: October 23, 1878 Edgewood, Illinois
- Died: 1963 (aged 84–85) San Pedro, Los Angeles
- Party: Democratic

Franklin Pierce Buyer (October 23, 1878 – March 1963) was a traveling salesman who was on the Los Angeles City Council between 1933 and 1939. He was a Democrat.

== Biography ==
Buyer was born on October 23, 1878, in Edgewood, Illinois, the son of Mary Carter. He went to public schools in Browns, Illinois. He and his wife, Dorothy, were married on November 35, 1907, and they adopted a daughter. He was a salesman who traveled about the country, but in 1920 he moved to Los Angeles.

After he completed his City Council term in 1939, he became the manager of an American Express office at 10810 South Broadway, where he was held up at least twice: The first time, in January 1947, he rousted the bandits "with a well-placed right hook", and they escaped with no money; he was left with head lacerations. He was then living at 156 West 109th Place. The second holdup was in January 1959, when he was slugged and three gunmen escaped with $400 from a cash drawer.

Buyer died in March 1963. leaving a wife, Viola.

== Elections ==
Buyer was elected to Los Angeles City Council District 15 in 1933, defeating incumbent Councilman A.E. Henning. Buyer was reelected in 1935 and 1937 but lost in 1939 to Wilder W. Hartley. In 1941, he was a candidate for election to the Los Angeles School Board.

== City Council ==
In 1939, Buyer was said to be the leader among City Council members in winning the largest amount of city funding for improvements in any council district. During the preceding two years the city allocated $530,726 for his district. This sum did not include the construction and furnishing of a branch city hall in Watts, which was achieved during his term.

Preceded by A. E. Henning	Los Angeles City Council; 15th District; 1933–1939	Succeeded by Wilder W. Hartley
