= Edgewood, Illinois =

- Village
- Location of Edgewood in Effingham County, Illinois.
- Coordinates: 38°55′20″N 88°39′50″W
- Country: United States
- State: Illinois
- County: Effingham

Area
  - Total: 1.02 sq mi (2.65 km^{2})
  - Land: 1.01 sq mi (2.62 km^{2})
  - Water: 0.012 sq mi (0.03 km^{2})
- Elevation: 574 ft (175 m)

Population (2020)
  - Total: 398
  - Density: 392.8/sq mi (151.68/km^{2})
- Time zone: UTC-6 (CST)
  - Summer (DST): UTC-5 (CDT)
- ZIP code: 62426
- Area code: 217 618
- GNIS ID: 2398785
- FIPS code: 17-22567

Edgewood is a village in Effingham County, Illinois, United States. The population was 398 at the 2020 Census. Edgewood is part of the Effingham, IL Micropolitan Statistical Area.

== History ==
Edgewood was founded in the 1850s when the railroad was extended to that point. The village was named from its location near the edge of a forest. A post office has been in operation at Edgewood since 1858.

== Geography ==
Edgewood is located on the southern edge of Effingham Count. The village's southern border follows the Clay County line.

Illinois Route 37 passes through the village, leading northeast 3 miles (5 km) to Mason and southwest 8 miles (13 km) to Farina. Interstate 57 crosses the northwest corner of the village, with access from Exit 145 (Iowa Street); I-57 leads northeast 16 miles (26 km) to Effingham and southwest 28 miles (45 km) to Salem.

According to the 2021 census gazetteer files, Edgewood has a total area of 1.02 square miles (2.64 km^{2}), of which 1.01 square miles (2.62 km^{2}) (or 98.93%) is land and 0.01 square miles (0.03 km^{2}) (or 1.07%) is water.

== Demographics ==
Historical population
Census	Pop.	Note	%±
1880	252		—
1890	255		1.2%
1900	412		61.6%
1910	419		1.7%
1920	438		4.5%
1930	492		12.3%
1940	467		−5.1%
1950	515		10.3%
1960	515		0.0%
1970	495		−3.9%
1980	574		16.0%
1990	502		−12.5%
2000	527		5.0%
2010	440		−16.5%
2020	398		−9.5%
U.S. Decennial Census

As of the 2020 census there were 398 people, 198 households, and 152 families residing in the village. The population density was 388.67 inhabitants per square mile (150.07/km^{2}). There were 205 housing units at an average density of 200.20 per square mile (77.30/km^{2}). The racial makeup of the village was 92.71% White, 0.75% African American, 0.25% Native American, 0.50% Asian, 0.00% Pacific Islander, 1.01% from other races, and 4.77% from two or more races. Hispanic or Latino of any race were 1.76% of the population.

There were 198 households, out of which 33.3% had children under the age of 18 living with them, 60.61% were married couples living together, 9.60% had a female householder with no husband present, and 23.23% were non-families. 17.17% of all households were made up of individuals, and 7.07% had someone living alone who was 65 years of age or older. The average household size was 2.68 and the average family size was 2.37.

The village's age distribution consisted of 21.5% under the age of 18, 10.2% from 18 to 24, 26.4% from 25 to 44, 24.7% from 45 to 64, and 17.2% who were 65 years of age or older. The median age was 34.6 years. For every 100 females, there were 102.6 males. For every 100 females age 18 and over, there were 101.6 males.

The median income for a household in the village was $44,000, and the median income for a family was $53,056. Males had a median income of $36,029 versus $22,813 for females. The per capita income for the village was $20,469. About 3.9% of families and 7.3% of the population were below the poverty line, including 11.2% of those under age 18 and 7.4% of those age 65 or over.

== Notable people ==
- Franklin P. Buyer, member of the Los Angeles City Council (1933–1939), born in Edgewood
