= Joe Buscaino =

American politician and police officer

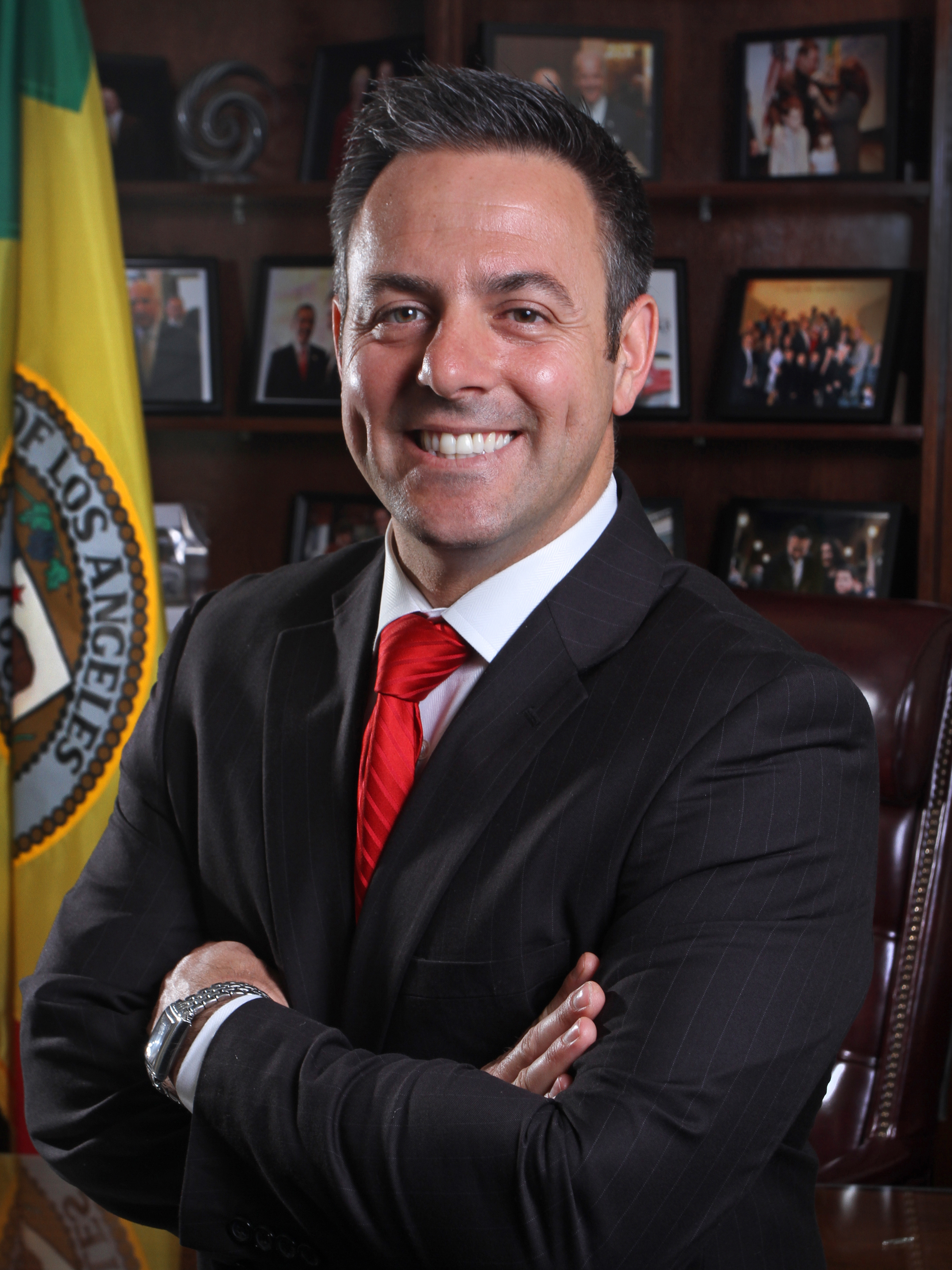
- Official portrait, 2012

Member of the Los Angeles City Council from the 15th district
- In office January 31, 2012 – December 12, 2022
- Preceded by: Janice Hahn
- Succeeded by: Tim McOsker

94th President of the National League of Cities
- In office 2020
- Preceded by: Karen Freeman-Wilson
- Succeeded by: Kathy Maness

President pro tempore of the Los Angeles City Council
- In office January 5, 2020 – September 28, 2021
- Preceded by: Nury Martinez
- Succeeded by: Mitch O'Farrell

Assistant President Pro Tempore of the Los Angeles City Council
- In office January 22, 2019 – January 5, 2020
- Preceded by: Nury Martinez
- Succeeded by: David Ryu

Personal details
- Born: Giuseppe Buscaino c. 1974 (age 51–52)
- Party: Democratic
- Spouse: Geralyn Buscaino
- Children: 2
- Education: California State University, Dominguez Hills (B.A.)
- Joe Buscaino's voice Joe Buscaino on creating solutions for homelessness in his district Recorded June 25, 2019

Giuseppe "Joe" Buscaino (born c. 1974) is an American politician and former police officer, who served as a member of the Los Angeles City Council for the 15th district from 2012 to 2022. A member of the Democratic Party, Buscaino served as President pro tempore of the council from 2020 to 2021.

Buscaino was an early entrant into the 2022 Los Angeles mayoral election, qualifying for the ballot after nearly a year of campaigning. He dropped out of the race on May 12, 2022, and endorsed Rick Caruso.

== Early life and education ==
Buscaino is the son of Italian immigrants. He graduated cum laude, with a B.A. in communications from California State University, Dominguez Hills, in 2000.

== Law enforcement career ==
Prior to his election to the City Council, Buscaino served as a police officer for fifteen years with the Los Angeles Police Department. He created the LAPD's Teen Community Police Advisory Board, which was implemented citywide in 2011.

== Los Angeles City Council (2012–2022) ==
Buscaino was elected to the 15th district on January 17, 2012 to fill the vacancy left by Janice Hahn, following her successful bid for the U.S. House of Representatives. Buscaino was re-elected on March 5, 2013, to a full four-year term with 83.09% of the vote. On March 7, 2017, Buscaino won re-election again with 74.85% of the vote.

Following his election, Buscaino was appointed by the city council president to serve as chairman of the Public Works Committee. The committee has oversight of the Department of Public Works, and its Bureaus of Sanitation, Street Services, Street Lighting, Engineering, and Contract Administration. The Department of Public Works is the city's third-largest department and has a staff of more than 5,000 employees, who are responsible for the construction, renovation, and operation of City facilities and infrastructure. The department also installs sewers, constructs storm drains, and builds the city's streets, as well as public buildings, rights-of-way, and service facilities.

Other committee assignments include Public Safety, which includes the LAPD, LAFD and Emergency Management; Trade, Travel & Tourism, which includes the Port of LA, Los Angeles World Airports and the LA Convention Center; Economic Development which includes Economic and Workforce Development Department, Transportation which includes LADOT and the Board of Referred Powers.

During his 2017 campaign for reelection, the editorial board for The Los Angeles Times characterized his performance as "adequate — no more and no less."

=== Tenure ===
==== Indigenous Peoples Day ====
In 2017 Buscaino ignited controversy when he spoke out against the motion of the Los Angeles City Council to rebrand Columbus Day as Indigenous Peoples Day. The move to change the name was largely supported by Native American activists, with the notable endorsement of Councilmember Mitch O'Farrell. Buscaino opposed a name change, but offered a compromise title of Immigrant Heritage Day. Buscaino's opposition and argument for Columbus Day was very rare, with Buscaino describing the proposal as "divisive". The measure passed 14-1 with only Buscaino dissenting.

==== Watts ====
In 2015, Buscaino successfully lobbied for the creation of Watts Serenity Park, a 1.13 acre parcel of land that was previously vacant and often the site of drug use and violent crimes. The $5 million project provided a safe space for community recreation with play equipment for kids, a Fitness Zone® exercise area for adults, and a skate park.

Buscaino also pushed for the renovation and re-opening of the 109th Street Pool and Rec Center in July 2016. A $4 million project that created 18 jobs, the area now offers residents the option of using a baseball diamond, indoor and outdoor basketball courts, a children's play area, tennis courts, a multipurpose sports field, and the 109th Street Pool, complete with a splash pad for younger children.

In March 2015, Buscaino also announced the 103rd St. Streetscape Improvement Project, which utilizes $1.25 million in METRO funding to ensure an improved experience for pedestrians using the 103rd St. blue line stop. Improvements to the streetscape include: 5 irrigated landscaped median islands, a gateway monument, access ramps, trash receptacles, benches, bicycle racks, way-finding signage, high visibility crosswalks, and sidewalk improvements.

Buscaino plans to use part of the $2 million in Green Streets funding given to the 15th District to make improvements to the historic Watts Towers area. These improvements aim to revitalize the area by planting hundreds of new trees, repaving sidewalks, repairing and replacing lights, and investing in the development of the Watts Towers Cultural Crescent.

==== San Pedro ====
Councilman Buscaino's Office has collaborated with the LA Great Streets Team and the Los Angeles Neighborhood Initiative to produce the Gaffey Street Conceptual Plan, which outlines an estimated $7.2 million in improvements along the entrance to San Pedro. The funding will allow for changes like landscaped medians, high visibility crosswalks, traffic signal synchronization, coordinated street furniture, sidewalk repairs and street sweeping, a solar powered Soofa bench, landscape enhancements and public art. The Conceptual Plan proposes traffic calming, improving the Gaffey St. pedestrian experience, making the landscape more drought tolerant, and providing more public spaces for the San Pedro community.

Councilman Buscaino helped create and support Clean San Pedro, a non-profit organization dedicated to cleaning and revitalizing the Pacific Corridor area of San Pedro. CSP was built by residents of San Pedro who were frustrated with the lack of beautification efforts in their city. These activists now perform a variety of functions—daily litter and debris removals, reporting of graffiti, weekly sidewalk cleaning, etc.--with the purpose of preserving their city's natural beauty. See cleansanpedro.net for more information.

San Pedro Courthouse: Councilman Buscaino's Office helped oversee the search for a developer who could transform the space occupied by the now-closed San Pedro Courthouse. The courthouse closed in January 2013, and since then, the area has been the subject of frequent conversations, as its location in the heart of downtown San Pedro makes it lucrative property. In November 2016, the LA County Board of Supervisors announced plans to team up with real estate firm Holland Partner Group to build a multi-use development in the 1.8 acre space. Past projections by the Supervisors indicated that the area could accommodate up to 250 residential apartments.

For years, San Pedro's Ports O' Call fishing village has undergone a steady decline in revenues and community engagement. While busy on weekends, the market is often dull during the week, and as a result, roughly a fifth of the shops have been forced to close. The San Pedro Waterfront Redevelopment Project, a $100 million dollar endeavor, will revitalize much of LA's waterfront. The Ports O' Call village will be torn down and replaced with the San Pedro Public Market, a 16 acre development that will feature restaurants, markets, bars, shops, offices, a waterfront promenade, and an amphitheater for live entertainment. Construction on the project is set to begin in late 2017.

Push for faster rescue boats: Ever since a tragic April 2015 accident that claimed the lives of two children in the Port of LA, Councilman Buscaino has been vocal about the need for faster rescue boats. The Councilman continues to advocate for the purchase of new, faster response boats. The current response boat for the Port of LA is Fireboat 2, which was acquired by the city Fire Department in 2003; Fireboat 2 is the largest boat of its kind west of the Mississippi, but with that size comes a tradeoff of speed.

==== Los Angeles Police Department ====
Buscaino is a staunch opponent of cutting police budgets and defunding the police. A former full-time police officer, Buscaino still serves as a reserve officer. His experience as a police officer is considered one of the reasons for his election to the City Council. He was elected for the first time to the council with more than $220,000 in donations from the police union Los Angeles Police Protective League, a fact that came under scrutiny in light of renewed opposition to police union spending.

In June 2020, in the wake of widespread protests following the murder of George Floyd, Buscaino organized a "unity march" with the NAACP and the Los Angeles Police Department. In a July 2020 vote to cut the LAPD by $150 million, Buscaino was one of the only two votes against the proposal. In an op-ed, Buscaino claimed that conversations with police officers convinced him that policing needs "smart investments" and "deliberate planning," rather than funding cuts.

=== National League of Cities ===
On November 10, 2018, Joe Buscaino was named First Vice President of the National League of Cities after previously serving as the Second Vice President of the NLC. In 2018, the annual NLC City Summit was held in Los Angeles, where Buscaino acted as the host of the event for over 5,000 mayors, city officials, and staff members. He was elected as president on November 23, 2019.

== 2022 Los Angeles mayoral campaign ==
On March 15, 2021, Buscaino announced his campaign for Mayor of Los Angeles. On May 12, 2022, Buscaino announced the end of his mayoral campaign before the primary election took place.

== Personal life ==
Buscaino has lived in the 15th Council District all his life. He has served on the board of directors of the Boys and Girls Clubs of the Harbor Area, the San Pedro YWCA's Racial Justice Committee and the Advisory Council for the Los Angeles Watts Summer Games. He is a member of Mary Star of the Sea Catholic Church and is active in Italian-American organizations.

== Electoral history ==
=== 2012 ===
2012 Los Angeles City Council special election, District 15
Primary election
Candidate	Votes	%
Joe Buscaino	10,830	59.47
Warren Furutani	7,381	40.53
Total votes	18,211	100.00

=== 2013 ===
2013 Los Angeles City Council election, District 15
Primary election
Candidate	Votes	%
Joe Buscaino (incumbent)	11,723	83.33
James Law	2,255	16.67
Total votes	13,528	100.00

=== 2017 ===
2017 Los Angeles City Council election, District 15
Primary election
Candidate	Votes	%
Joe Buscaino (incumbent)	12,497	74.85
Caney Arnold	2,750	16.47
Noel Gould	1,449	8.68
Total votes	16,696	100.00

=== 2022 ===
2022 Los Angeles mayoral primary election
Candidate	Votes	%
Karen Bass	278,511	43.11
Rick Caruso	232,490	35.99
Kevin de León	50,372	7.79
Gina Viola	44,341	6.86
Mike Feuer (withdrawn)	12,087	1.87
Andrew Kim	9,405	1.46
Alex Gruenenfelder Smith	6,153	0.95
Joe Buscaino (withdrawn)	4,485	0.69
Craig Greiwe	2,439	0.38
Mel Wilson	2,336	0.36
Ramit Varma (withdrawn)	1,916	0.30
John "Jsamuel" Jackson	1,511	0.23
Total votes	646,058	100.00

Political offices
Preceded by Janice Hahn	Los Angeles City Council member, 15th district January 31, 2012 – December 11, 2022	Succeeded by Tim McOsker
Preceded by Nury Martinez	President pro tempore of the Los Angeles City Council; January 5, 2020 – September 28, 2021	Succeeded by Mitch O'Farrell
Preceded by Nury Martinez	Assistant President Pro Tempore of the Los Angeles City Council; January 22, 2019 – January 5, 2020	Succeeded by David Ryu
