= Zip Zabel =

American baseball player (1891–1970)

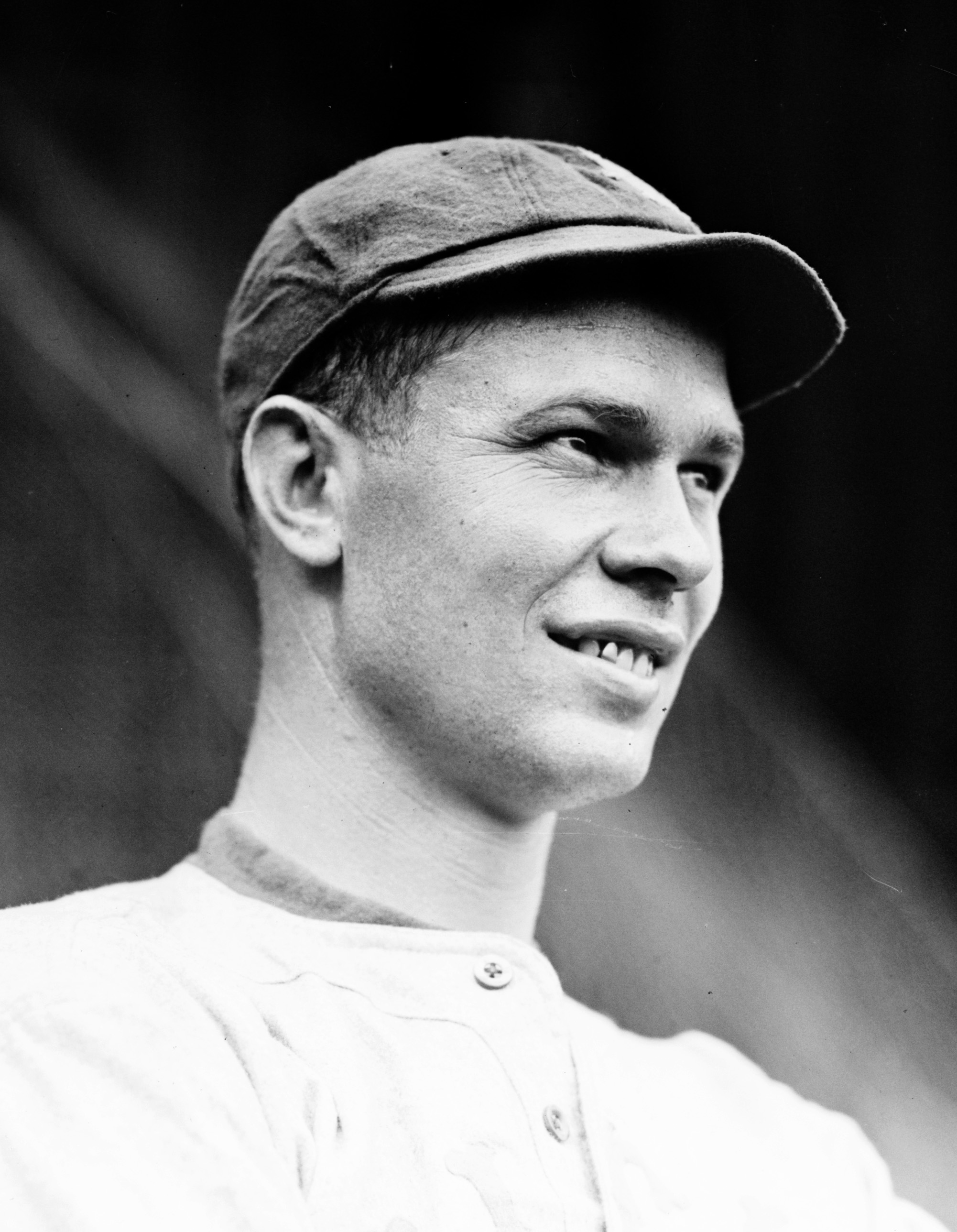
- Pitcher
- Born: February 18, 1891; Wetmore, Kansas, U.S.
- Died: May 31, 1970 (aged 79); Beloit, Wisconsin, U.S.
- Batted: Right Threw: Right

MLB debut
- October 5, 1913, for the Chicago Cubs

Last MLB appearance
- September 29, 1915, for the Chicago Cubs

MLB statistics
- Win–loss record: 12–14
- Earned run average: 2.71
- Strikeouts: 110
- Stats at Baseball Reference

Teams
- Chicago Cubs (1913–1915)

Career highlights and awards
- Holds the major league record for relief innings in a single game, 18 1/3 innings

George Washington "Zip" Zabel (February 18, 1891 – May 31, 1970) was an American professional baseball pitcher. He played all or part of three seasons in Major League Baseball in 1913-15 for the Chicago Cubs.

Zabel attended Baker University, in Baldwin City, Kansas, where he earned a bachelor's degree in 1916 in chemistry.

On June 17, 1915, Zabel set the record for most innings pitched in relief in one game. He came into the game in relief for Bert Humphries with two outs in the first inning, and pitched the final 18 1/3 innings to earn the win over the Brooklyn Robins (now the Los Angeles Dodgers) and opposing pitcher Jeff Pfeffer, who pitched the complete game.

After that game, Zabel only played one more start in the majors, as he had begun to experience arm trouble as a result of the game. He then played two years in the minors in Los Angeles and Toronto before retiring from baseball in July 1917. Afterwards, he went to work for Fairbanks Morse in Beloit, Wisconsin, where he eventually rose to the position of chief metallurgist. He continued to work there in various capacities for the next 32 years.

After moving to Beloit, he played for their city baseball team for a season.

In 1919, Zabel became a referee for Beloit's city football team. In a game between the Green Bay Packers and Beloit on November 23, he was accused of many bad calls by George Calhoun, Green Bay's manager. Those calls included mistakenly adding 5 seconds to the clock before half time, taking away a Packers touchdown by instead placing the ball at the 2, calling a non-existent offsides penalty on the Packers on the subsequent play, which also would have been a touchdown, and not calling fan interference when a fan stepped on the field and tripped Packers quarterback Orlo McLean, who was running downfield.
