= Tim McOsker =

American politician (born 1962)

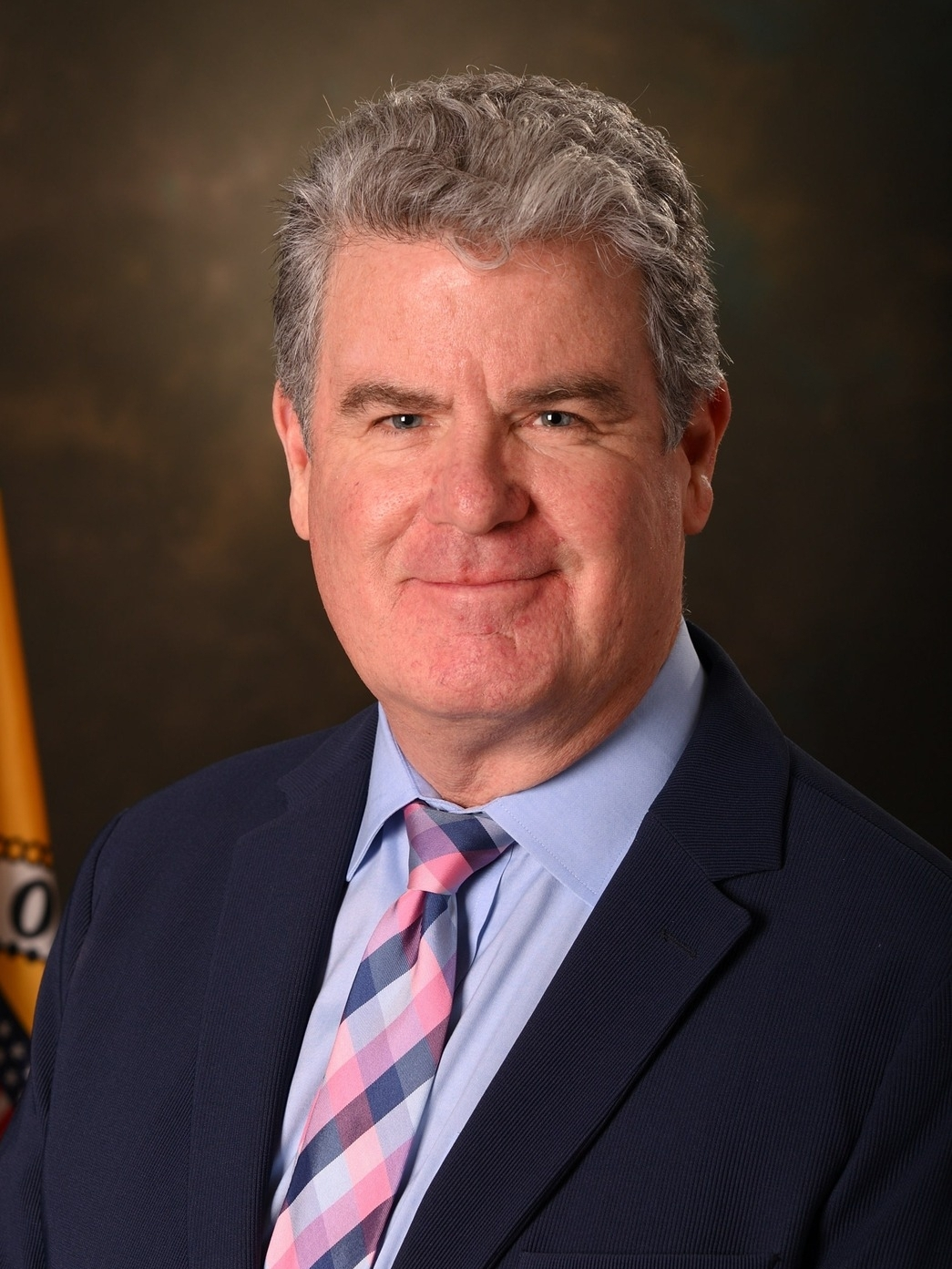
- Official portrait, 2023

Member of the Los Angeles City Council from the 15th district
- Incumbent
- Assumed office December 12, 2022
- Preceded by: Joe Buscaino

Personal details
- Born: June 14, 1962 (age 64) Los Angeles, California, U.S.
- Party: Democratic
- Education: University of Notre Dame (BA); University of California, Los Angeles (JD)
- McOsker's voice McOsker on the Rancho LPG storage facility site in San Pedro. Recorded June 10, 2023

Timothy B. McOsker (born June 14, 1962) is an American politician, businessman, attorney, and former lobbyist, serving as a member of the Los Angeles City Council for the 15th district. Prior to that, he was the CEO of AltaSea at the Port of Los Angeles from 2018 to 2022 and chief of staff to Los Angeles City Attorney and later Mayor James Hahn from 1997 to 2005.

== Early life and education ==
McOsker was born in San Pedro, Los Angeles on June 14, 1962, to one of six children, with his parents also being from San Pedro. He attended the University of Notre Dame and then received a Juris Doctor from the University of California, Los Angeles School of Law.

== Chief of staff (1997–2005) ==
In 1997, then Los Angeles City Attorney James Hahn made McOsker his chief of staff, saying that they had both lived in the San Pedro, Los Angeles and bonded when McOsker was a contract worker. After Hahn defeated Antonio Villaraigosa in the 2001 mayoral election, McOsker was named as chief of staff, the first appointment Hahn made. His authority within the staff grew after the resignations of three deputy mayors. In 2004, authorities sought emails from Hahn and his staff, including McOsker's emails.

== Post-Los Angeles City staff (2005–2022) ==
In 2005, after the mayoral election where Hahn lost to Villaraigosa, McOsker joined the law firm Glaser Weil Fink Jacobs Howard Avchen & Shapiro LLP. He stayed at the company until 2008 when he joined Mayer Brown until 2013. He then joined Glaser Weil in 2013.

On January 25, 2018, the AltaSea’s Board of Trustees named McOsker as its chief executive officer, which became effective on February 1, 2018. A year before, McOsker had represented AltaSea during legal matters including during the lease renegotiations with the Port of Los Angeles in 2017. He oversaw the company's contracts, leases, land deals and partnership negotiations as well as overseeing the land use for the Southern California Marine Institute. He replaced Jenny Krusoe, who became the executive director.

On December 14, 2021, they named Terry Tamminen as its chief officer after McOsker announced his run for city council.

== Los Angeles City Council (2022–present) ==
In 2021, McOsker announced that he would be running in the 2022 Los Angeles elections for Los Angeles City Council District 15 to replace Joe Buscaino, who was retiring from the office for an unsuccessful run for mayor. McOsker qualified for the candidacy in March 2022. In the primary election, McOsker took the lead over candidates Danielle Sandoval, Anthony Santich, and Bryant Odega. He was forced into a runoff with Sandoval as he did not gain 50% of the vote. McOsker won with 65.44% of the vote in the general election, and was sworn in on December 11, 2022.

== Electoral history ==
2022 Los Angeles City Council District 15 election
Primary election
Candidate	Votes	%
Tim McOsker	9,891	37.69
Danielle Sandoval	7,704	29.36
Anthony D. Santich	4,512	17.19
Bryant Odega	4,137	15.76
Total votes	26,244	100.00
General election
Tim McOsker	26,164	64.24
Danielle Sandoval	14,563	35.76
Total votes	40,727	100.00

2026 Los Angeles City Council District 15 election
Candidate	Votes	%
Tim McOsker (incumbent)	28,824	76.55
Jordan Rivers	8,831	23.45
Total votes	37,655	100.00
