= Charles J. Colden =

American politician (1870–1938)

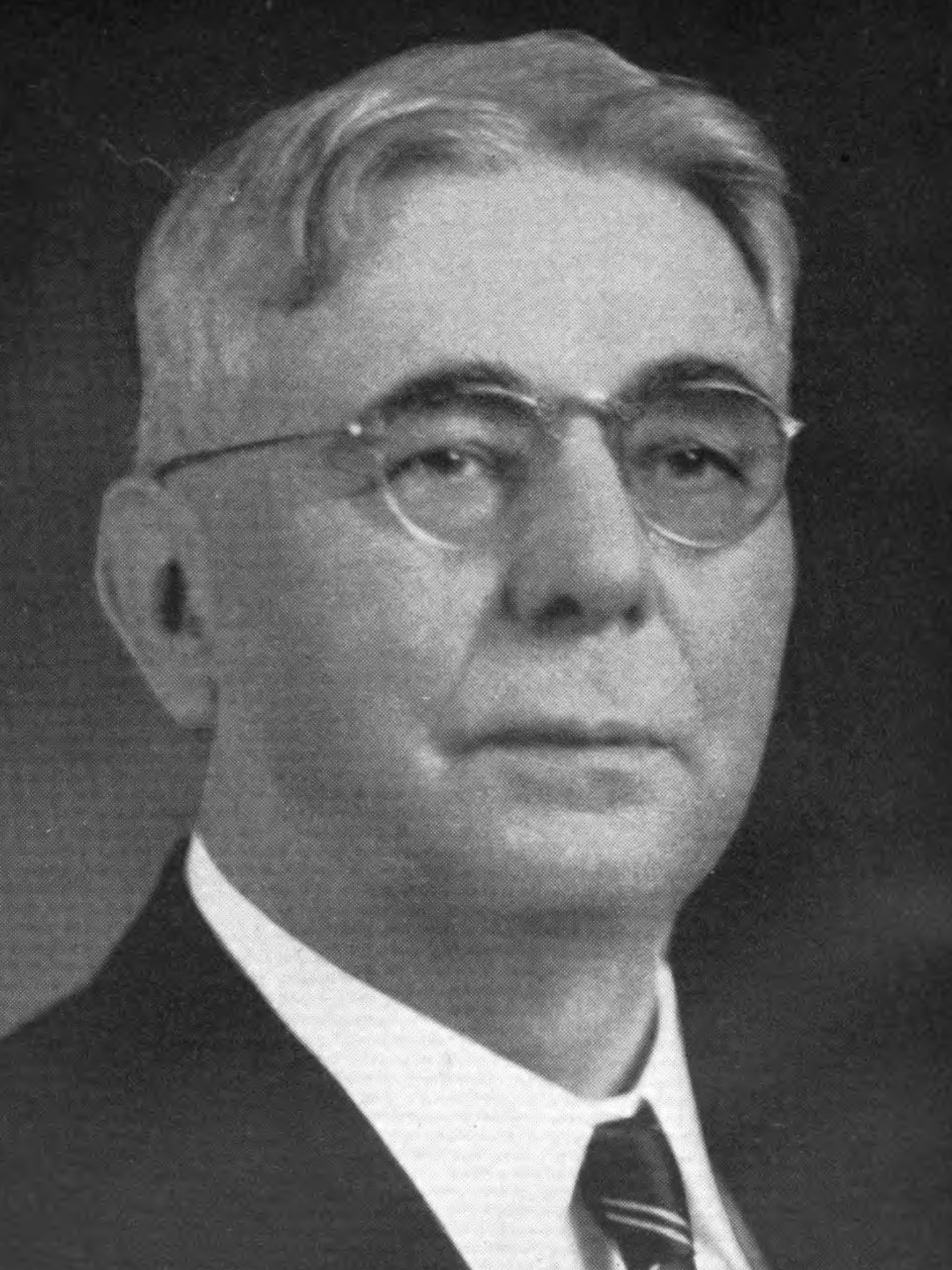

Member of the U.S. House of Representatives from California's 17th district
- In office March 4, 1933 – April 15, 1938
- Preceded by: District created
- Succeeded by: Lee E. Geyer

Member of the Los Angeles City Council from the 15th district
- In office July 1, 1925 – June 30, 1929
- Preceded by: District created
- Succeeded by: A. E. Henning

Member of the Missouri House of Representatives from the Nodaway County district
- In office January 2, 1901 – January 4, 1905

Personal details
- Born: August 24, 1870 Peoria County, Illinois, U.S.
- Died: April 15, 1938 (aged 67) Washington, D.C., U.S.
- Resting place: Roosevelt Memorial Park Cemetery, Gardena, California
- Party: Democratic
- Spouse: Clara Norman (m. 1914)
- Children: Charles Jr.

Charles J. Colden (August 24, 1870 – April 15, 1938) was a politician who served on the Los Angeles City Council and from 1933 to 1938 as a member of the U.S. Congress.

== Biography ==
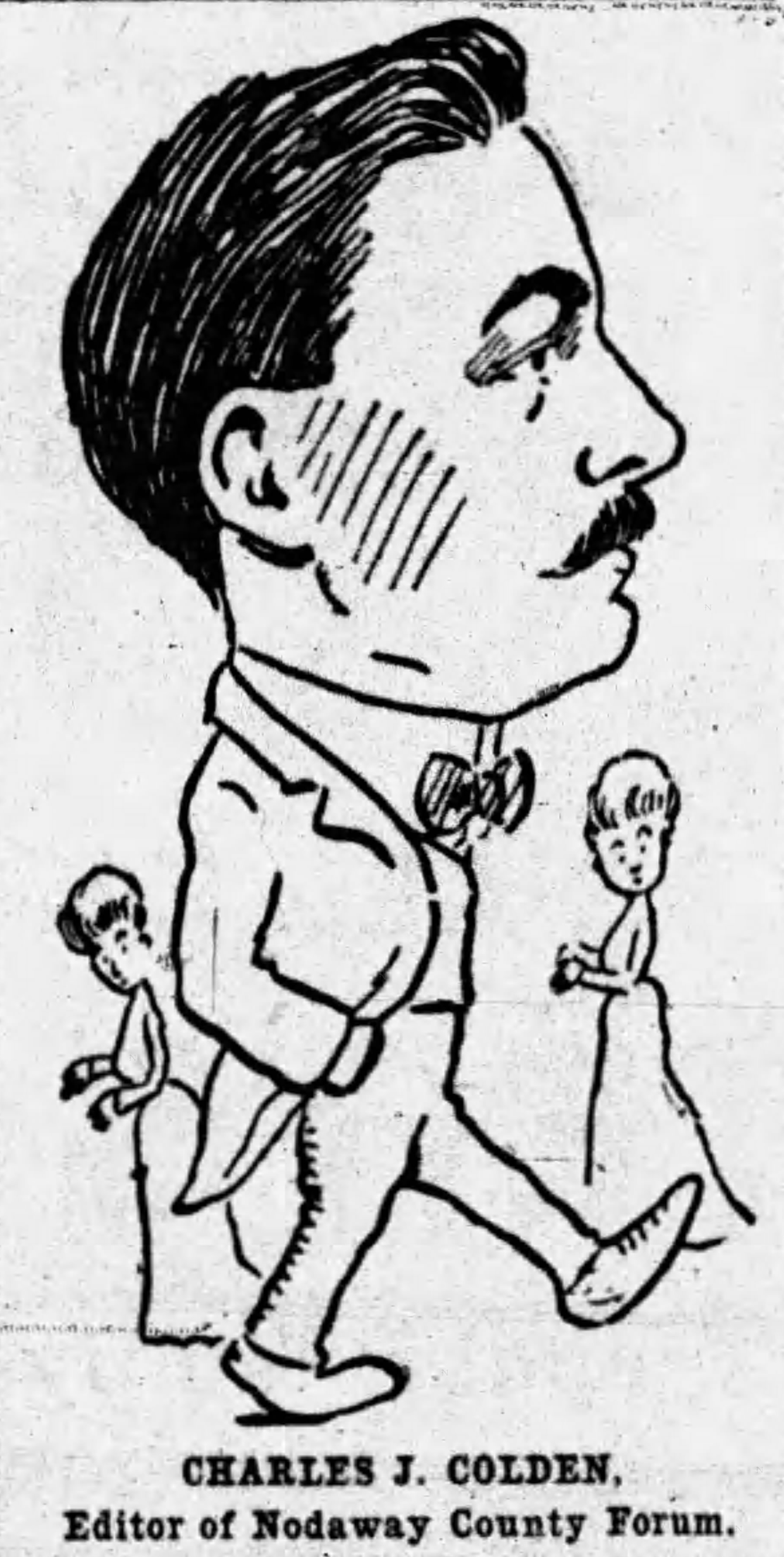
Illustration of Colden published in the St. Joseph News-Press, November 21, 1903

Colden was born on a farm in Peoria County, Illinois, and moved at age 10 with his parents to Nodaway County, Missouri, in 1880. He attended grade school at the Ireland Schoolhouse near their farm, and later went to Maryville High School some ten miles distant in Maryville, Missouri. He attended Stanberry Normal School in Stanberry, Missouri, and Shenandoah College in Shenandoah, Iowa.

Colden taught school in Missouri and Iowa from 1889 to 1896. He was the editor and publisher of the Parnell Sentinel from 1896 to 1900 and the Nodaway Forum (which became the Maryville Daily Forum, in Maryville, Missouri, from 1900 to 1908.

He was president of the board of regents of Northwest Missouri Teachers College from 1905 to 1908. Colden Hall at the school is named for him. From 1908 to 1912 he was in the construction business in Kansas City, Missouri.

Colden took a vacation tour of the West in 1912 and "was attracted to the possibilities" of the Los Angeles harbor in San Pedro and soon settled there, continuing in the real estate and building business. He was the president of the San Pedro Chamber of Commerce from 1922 to 1924.

=== Death and burial ===
He died in Washington, D.C., and was buried in Roosevelt Memorial Park Cemetery in Gardena, California, but in 1965 his body was reinterred at Green Hills Memorial Park in Rancho Palos Verdes, California.

He was survived by his wife, Clara N. Colden; a sister, Mrs. B.C. Hall, two daughters, Mrs. Lester Hawthorne and Abbe Colden; and two sons, John C. Colden and Charles J. Colden Jr.

== Political life ==
=== Missouri ===
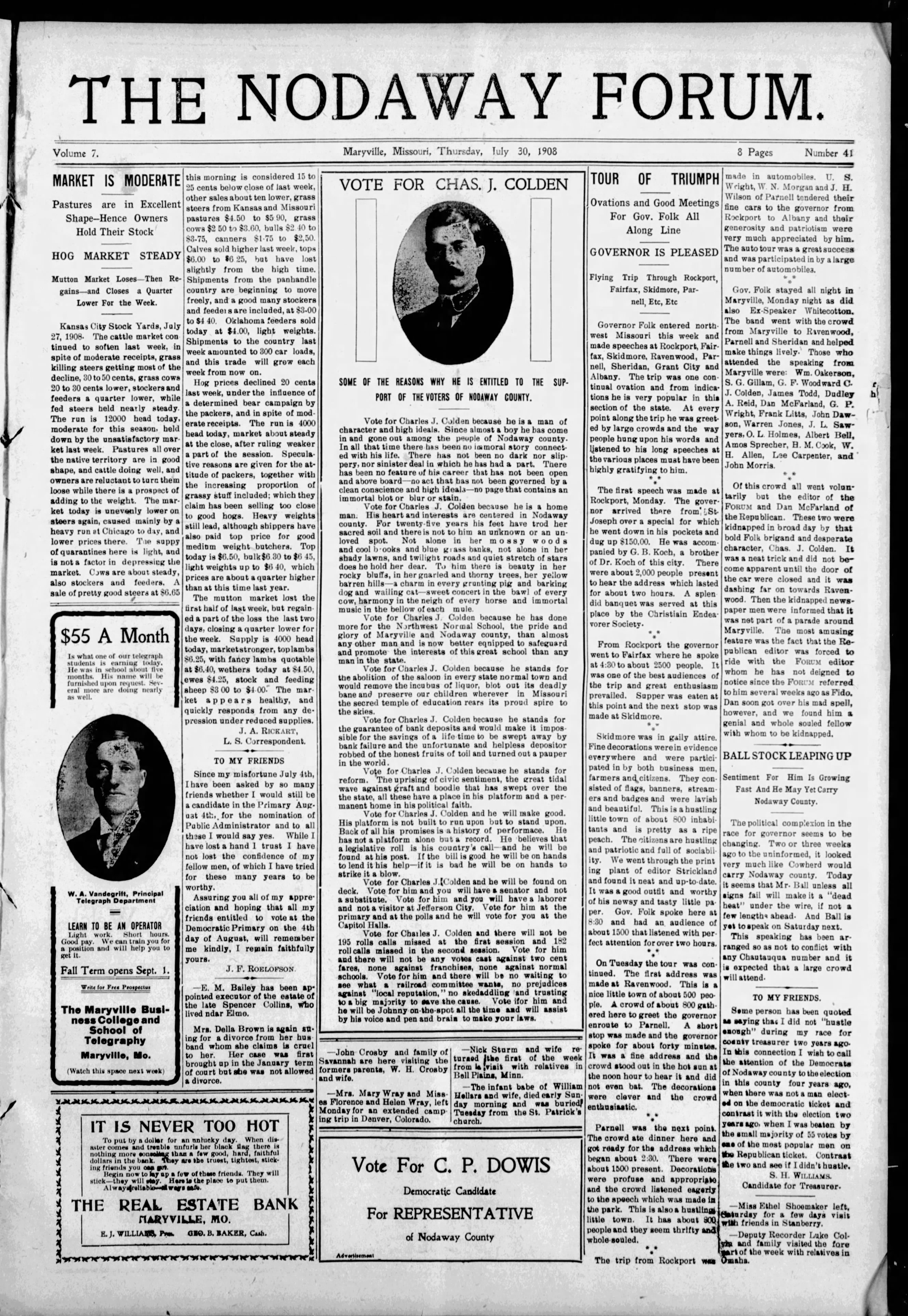
The front page of The Nodaway Forum promotes Colden's candidacy for State Senate, July 30, 1908

Colden was a member of the Missouri House of Representatives from 1901 to 1905.

=== California ===
==== Planning ====
He was a member of the city's first planning commission in 1920, which at that time was composed of 51 people appointed by the City Council "to work out an organized, comprehensive plan of city development." Other notable members were Eugene Biscailuz, Charles A. Holland, Evan Lewis and W.H. Workman Jr.

==== Harbor ====
Colden was president of the Los Angeles Harbor commission from 1923 to 1925. While on the commission, he worked vigorously for the Harbor Belt Line that linked all the port facilities via rail. He also led a fight to give the Santa Fe Railroad access to the waterfront.

In January 1925, Edgar McKee, former president of the harbor board, filed suit against Colden, charging him with "having conspired . . . to oust McKee as president of the Harbor Board and to have plotted to ruin him." McKee claimed that Colden and others attempted to involve McKee 'in various deals involving the purchase of lands for the Harbor Commission and through which they intended to make a private profit." Colden denied the charge, and the matter was later settled out of court.

==== City Council ====
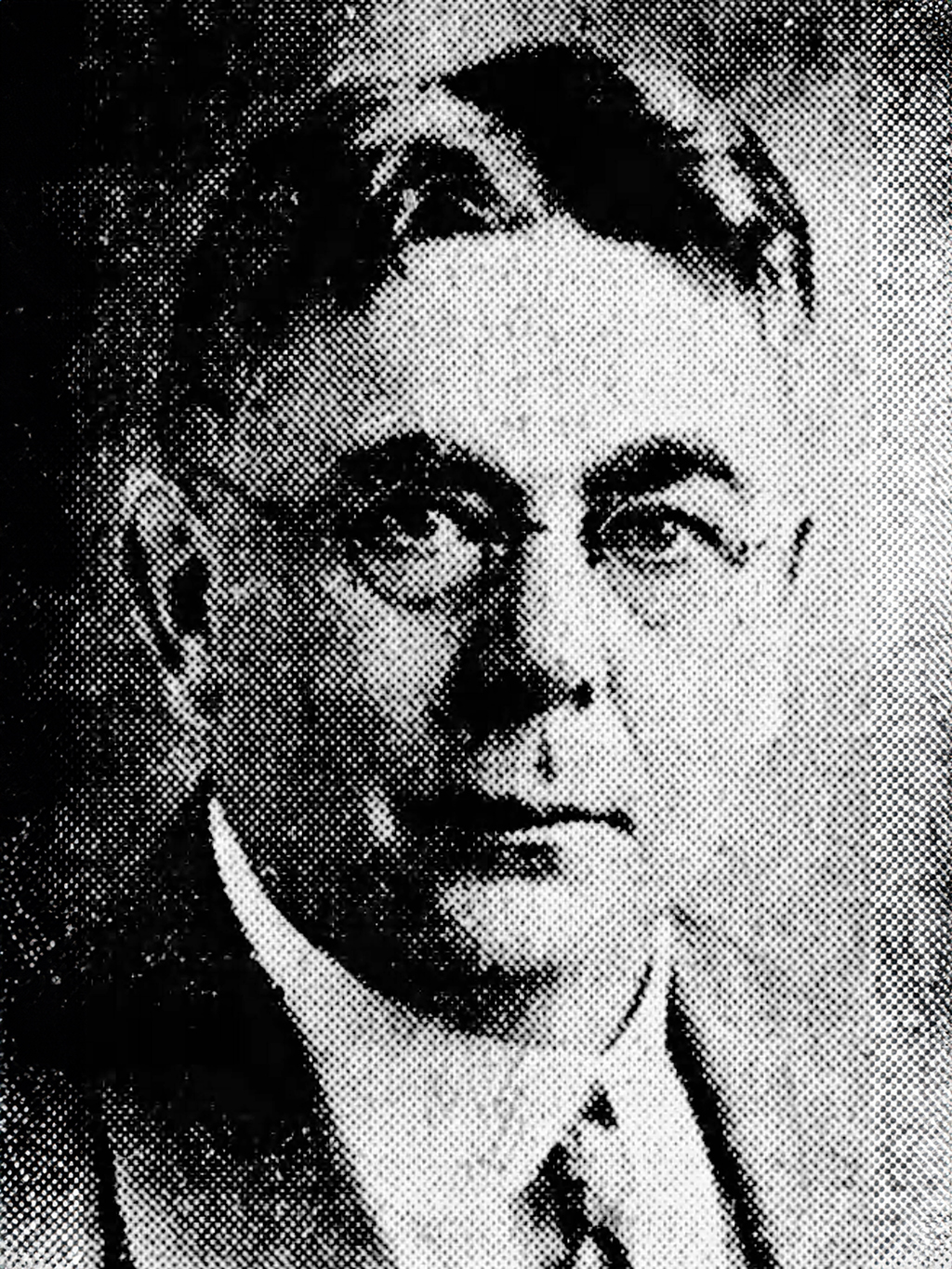
Colden in 1929

Colden was the first resident of the Harbor Area to serve on the Los Angeles City Council since the area was annexed to the city in 1909 through a shoestring strip that attached the district to the main part of the city some 20 miles to the north. He ran for the council in an at-large election in 1923, but placed 10th in a field of eighteen and only the first nine were elected.

In 1925 a new city charter gave the district and 14 others their own representatives on the council, creating the 15th District. He ran for this new post and edged James H. Dodson Jr. in the general election, 4,750 votes to 4,599. He was reelected in the May 1927 primary. Colden did not run in the 1929 election, noting his disappointment that the city had chosen to purchase "an airport and the classification yards at the harbor" when "These projects might have been [better] promoted by the beneficiaries and by private enterprise."

==== Congress ====
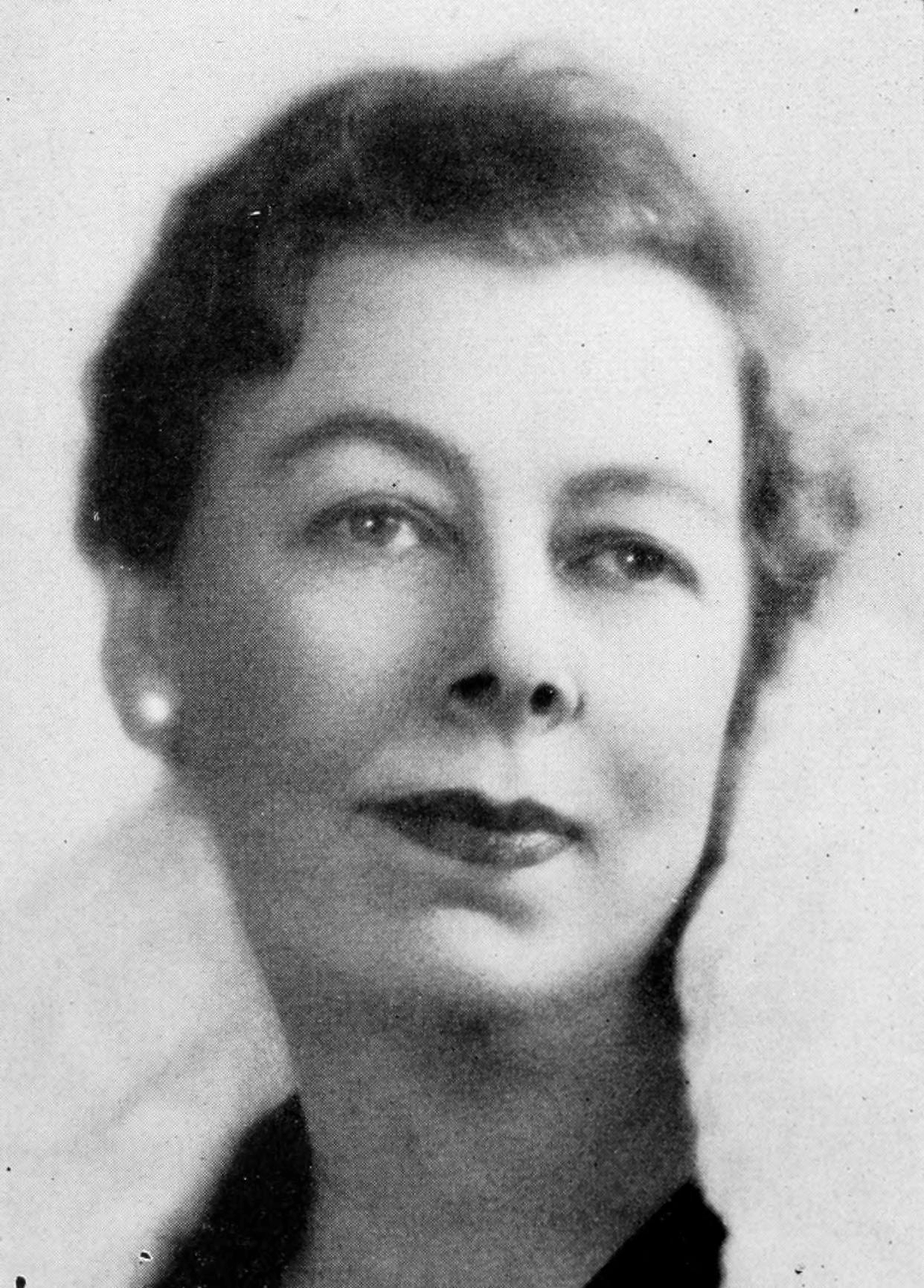
Colden's wife Clara, who ran to succeed him in Congress but lost in the primary to Lee E. Geyer

Colden was elected to Congress as a Democrat from California's 17th district and served from March 4, 1933, until his death in 1938.

During the 1934 California gubernatorial election, Colden supported George Creel in the Democratic primary. However, after Upton Sinclair won, Colden announced his support for him as the Democratic nominee, and endorsed his "End Poverty in California" program.

== Liberty ship ==
The Charles J. Colden (hull number 2691) was one of the type EC2-S-C1 Liberty ships built by Permanente Metals Yard No. 2 in Richmond, California, for the U.S. Maritime Commission from 1941 to 1945.

== Electoral history ==
1932 United States House of Representatives elections in California
Party	Candidate	Votes	%
Democratic	Charles J. Colden	50,720	62.2
Republican	A. E. Henning	26,868	32.9
Liberty	Ernest E. Debs	3,965	4.9
Total votes		81,553	100.0
Turnout			
Democratic win (new seat)			

1934 United States House of Representatives elections in California
Party	Candidate	Votes	%
Democratic	Charles J. Colden (incumbent)	60,045	70.4
Republican	C. P. "Cap" Wright	20,508	24.0
Socialist	Richard Pomeroy	4,721	5.6
Total votes		85,274	100.0
Turnout			
Democratic hold			

1936 United States House of Representatives elections in California
Party	Candidate	Votes	%
Democratic	Charles J. Colden (incumbent)	68,189	71.9
Republican	Leonard Roach	24,981	26.3
Communist	John L. Leech	1,634	1.8
Total votes		94,804	100.0
Turnout			
Democratic hold			

== See also ==
- List of members of the United States Congress who died in office (1900–1949)

== Other references ==
- Chronological Record of Los Angeles City Officials: 1850—1938, compiled under the direction of the Municipal Reference Library, City Hall, Los Angeles, March 1938 (reprinted 1966)

Political offices
Preceded by —	Los Angeles City Council; 15th District; 1925–1929	Succeeded by A. E. Henning
U.S. House of Representatives
Preceded by —	Member of the U.S. House of Representatives from California's 17th congressional district 1933-1938	Succeeded by Lee E. Geyer
