= Rudy Svorinich =

American politician

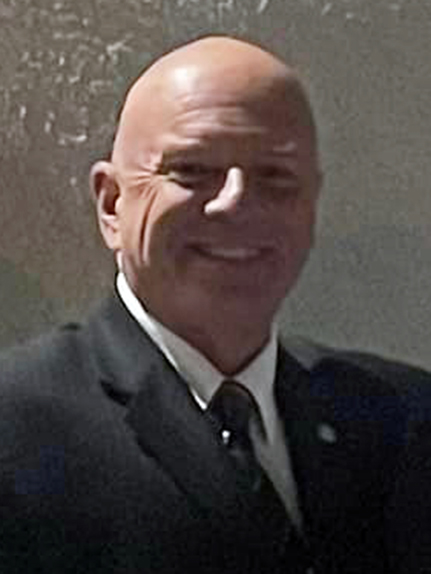
- Svorinich in 2023

Member of the Los Angeles City Council from the 15th district
- In office July 1, 1993 – June 30, 2001
- Preceded by: Joan Milke Flores
- Succeeded by: Janice Hahn

Personal details
- Born: Rudy Svorinich Jr. 1960 (age 65–66) San Pedro, Los Angeles, U.S.
- Party: Republican
- Education: California State University Dominguez Hills
- Rudy Svorinich's voice Rudy Svorinich on his family history in San Pedro, Los Angeles; Recorded December 2007

Rudy Svorinich Jr. (born 1960) is an American politician who served on the Los Angeles City Council for the 15th district. He was elected to the council in 1993, defeating three-term incumbent Joan Milke Flores, and served two full terms until 2001.

== Personal life ==
Svorinich was born in 1960 in San Pedro, Los Angeles to Rudy Svorinich Sr. and Winifred Svorinich. He attended San Pedro High School and graduated from California State University Dominguez Hills with bachelor's degree in business administration.

== Political career ==
In 1992, Svorinich ran for the Los Angeles City Council's 15th district against incumbent Joan Milke Flores. He placed second in the primary, and in the general election ousted Flores in the election by a five-point margin. During his first term, five of his aides quit, to which Svorinich portrayed as a reorganization of the office. Many other aides were also fired, which prompted allegations of misconduct, but an ethics panel found no campaign violations.

In 1997, he was opposed for re-election by three candidates who tried to force Svorinich into a runoff by having different candidates prevent Svorinich from having 50% of the vote. In the primary, he was elected 60% of the vote. In 1998, he ran for the Republican nomination for the California's 36th congressional district, but lost to Steven T. Kuykendall.

== Post-Council ==
In 2000, as he was term limited for the City Council, Svorinich made an unsuccessful bid for California's 54th State Assembly district, being defeated by Democrat Alan Lowenthal by a double-digit margin. Svorinich ran for his old seat in the 2011 special election after Hahn was elected to the United States House of Representatives, but lost the primary placing fourth overall.

In 2001, he founded Svorinich & Associates, Inc., a consulting firm. He is currently President of Svorinich Companies, Inc. a government-affairs firm in San Pedro, as well as the president of Svorinich Political Services, a political consulting and campaign-management company.

== Electoral history ==
=== 1993 ===
1993 Los Angeles City Council election, District 15
Primary election
Candidate	Votes	%
Joan Milke Flores (incumbent)	7,468	28.51
Rudy Svorinich	6,012	22.95
Janice Hahn	4,855	18.54
Diana Middleton	3,432	13.10
Warren Furutani	2,875	10.98
Louis Dominguez	1,070	4.09
James P. Thompson	482	1.84
Total votes	26,194	100.00
General election
Rudy Svorinich	16,285	52.73
Joan Milke Flores (incumbent)	14,597	47.27
Total votes	30,882	100.00

=== 1997 ===
1997 Los Angeles City Council election, District 15
Primary election
Candidate	Votes	%
Rudy Svorinich (incumbent)	13,741	60.73
Diana Elizabeth Contreras	6,375	28.17
Dennis Kortheuer	2,510	11.09
Total votes	22,626	100.00

Political offices
Preceded by Joan Milke Flores	Los Angeles City Councilman; 15th district 1993—2001	Succeeded by Janice Hahn
