= Lee E. Geyer =

American politician and educator (1888–1941)

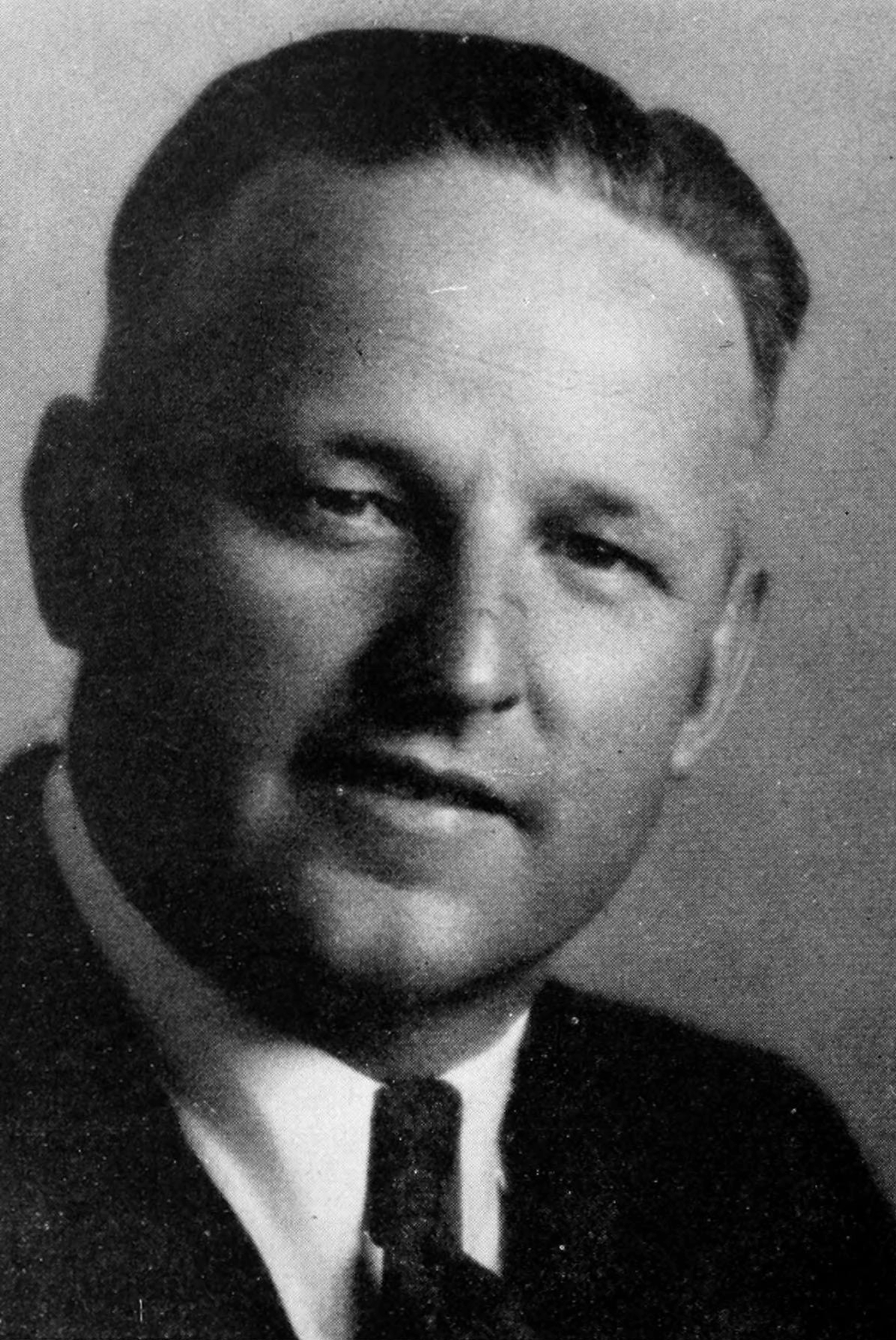
- Geyer c. 1940

Member of the U.S. House of Representatives from California's 17th district
- In office January 3, 1939 – October 11, 1941
- Preceded by: Charles J. Colden
- Succeeded by: Cecil R. King

Member of the California State Assembly from the 67th district
- In office January 7, 1935 – January 4, 1937
- Preceded by: Cecil R. King
- Succeeded by: Cecil R. King

Personal details
- Born: Lee Edward Geyer; September 9, 1888 Wetmore, Kansas, US
- Died: October 11, 1941 (aged 53) Washington, D.C., US
- Resting place: Wetmore Cemetery
- Party: Democratic
- Spouse: Nellie Lucille Cordts (m. 1919)
- Education: Baker University; University of Southern California

Military service
- Branch/service: United States Army
- Years of service: 1918
- Battles/wars: World War I

Lee Edward Geyer (September 9, 1888 – October 11, 1941) was an American educator and World War I veteran who served as a U.S. representative from California from 1939 to 1941. He died in office during his only term in Congress.

== Early life, education and career ==
Born in Wetmore, Kansas, Geyer attended the public schools, graduated from Baker University in 1922, and afterwards did post-graduate work at the University of Wisconsin–Madison and the University of Southern California at Los Angeles. He was a teacher in the rural schools in Nemaha County, Kansas from 1908 to 1912 and principal of Hamlin (Kansas) High School between 1916 and 1918.

Geyer married Nellie Lucille Cordts on December 11, 1919.

=== World War I ===
During the First World War, Geyer served as a private in the Third Company, First Battalion, Central Officers' Training School, Camp Grant, Illinois.

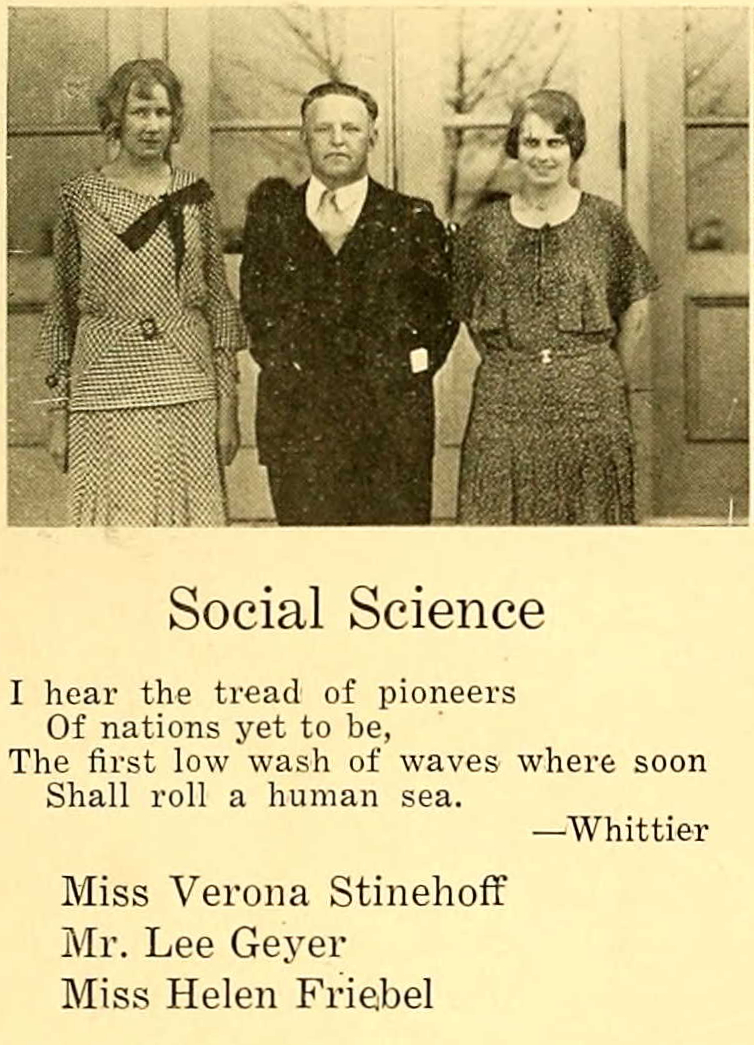
Geyer (center) with other members of the social science faculty at Gardena High School, 1931

Geyer was later a teacher and administrator in high schools in Kansas, Arizona and California from 1919 to 1938.

== Political career ==
=== State Assembly ===
Geyer was one of two dozen "EPIC Democrats" elected to the state legislature in 1934. He served as member of the State Assembly from 1935 to 1937. He was an unsuccessful candidate for election in 1936 to the seventy-fifth Congress.

=== Congress ===
Geyer was elected as a Democrat to the Seventy-sixth and Seventy-seventh Congresses and served from January 3, 1939, until his death. He authored the first anti-poll tax legislation which had not passed at the time of his death but was continued by others to become the 24th amendment to the U.S. Constitution. He served as delegate to the 1940 Democratic National Convention in Chicago.

== Death ==
Geyer died of pneumonia on October 11, 1941, in Washington, D.C. He was interred in Wetmore Cemetery, Wetmore, Kansas.

== Electoral history ==
1938 United States House of Representatives elections in California
Party	Candidate	Votes	%
Democratic	Lee E. Geyer (incumbent)	56,513	58.8
Republican	Clifton A. Hix	26,891	28.0
Townsend	Fred C. Wagner	8,870	9.2
Progressive Party (United States, 1924)	Robert O. Bates	3,774	3.9
Total votes		96,048	100.0
Turnout			
Democratic hold			

1940 United States House of Representatives elections in California
Party	Candidate	Votes	%
Democratic	Lee E. Geyer (incumbent)	75,109	65.5
Republican	Clifton A. Hix	32,862	28.6
Progressive Party (United States, 1924)	Samuel C. Converse	5,649	4.9
Communist	Harry L. Gray	1,118	1.0
Total votes		114,738	100.0
Turnout			
Democratic hold			

== See also ==
- List of members of the United States Congress who died in office (1900–1949)

== Sources ==
- United States Congress. "Lee E. Geyer (id: G000147)". Biographical Directory of the United States Congress.

U.S. House of Representatives
Preceded by Charles J. Colden	Member of the U.S. House of Representatives from California's 17th congressional district 1939–1941	Succeeded by Cecil R. King
