= A. E. Henning =

American politician, civil engineer and businessman (1887-1970)

August E. Henning
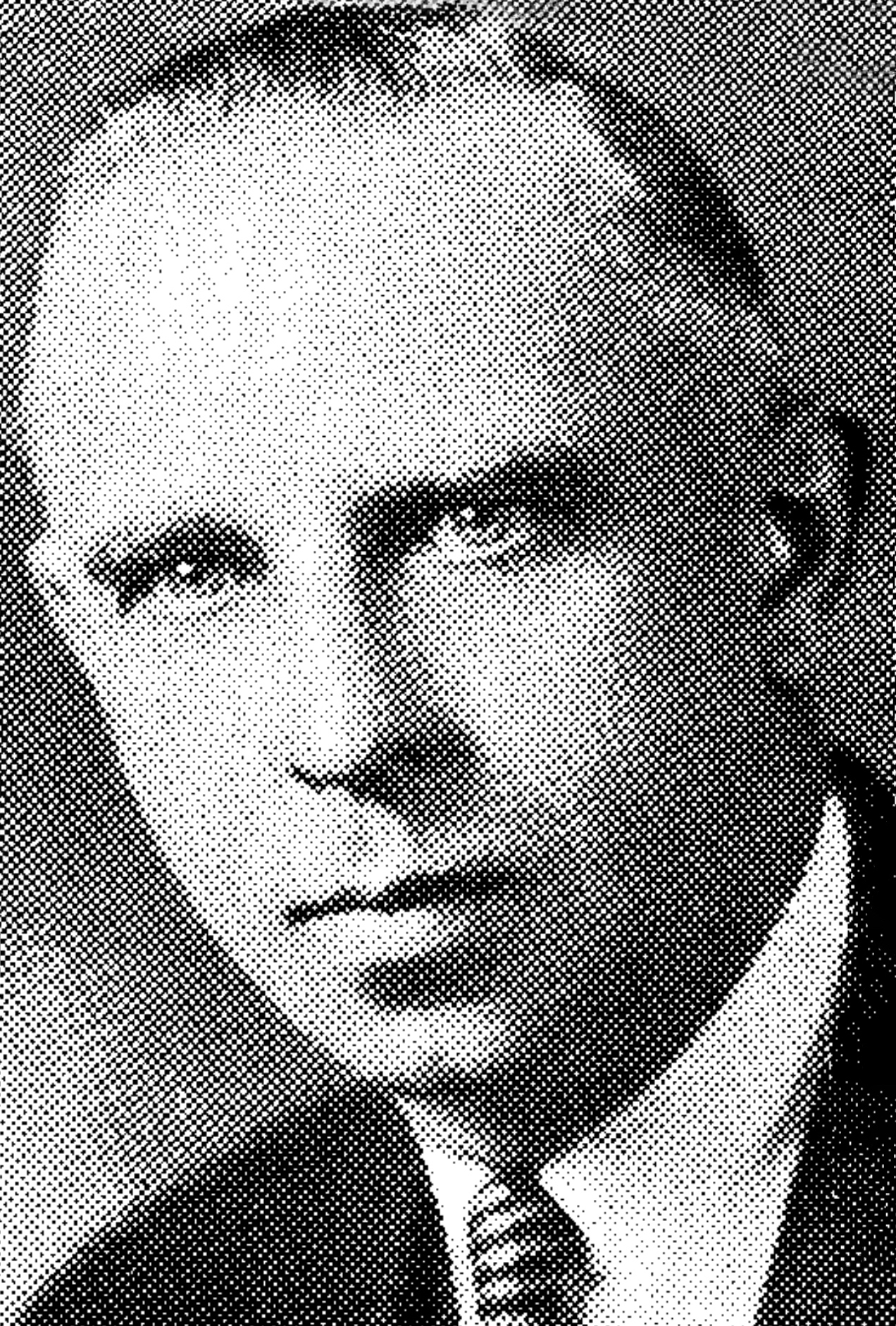
- Henning in 1931

Member of the Los Angeles City Council from the 15th district
- In office July 1, 1929 – June 30, 1933
- Preceded by: Charles J. Colden
- Succeeded by: Franklin Pierce Buyer

Personal details
- Born: January 14, 1887 Watseka, Illinois, U.S.
- Died: March 7, 1970 (aged 83) Red Bank, New Jersey, U.S.
- Political party: Republican
- Occupation: Civil engineer and businessman

August E. Henning (January 14, 1887 – March 7, 1970) was a civil engineer and businessman who was a member of the Los Angeles City Council between 1929 and 1933, disbursement officer for the California State Emergency Relief Administration from 1934 to 1937 and chief of the Park Division, California Department of Natural Resources, after 1937.

== Early life ==
Henning was born on January 14, 1887, in Watseka, Illinois. He went to public schools there, graduated from high school in 1905 and then studied at Purdue University to become a civil engineer, receiving his degree in 1909. He taught science and geometry at Watseka High School after 1910. He joined the Army and was commissioned as a second lieutenant during World War I.

He taught civil engineering at Purdue in the 1918 and 1919 school years, moving in the early 1920s to California, where he was director of vocational education in the Santa Ana public schools. He was then variously a civil engineer, real estate and insurance man and industrial banker in the Pacific Northwest. He invested heavily in real estate. Henning also operated a bakery in San Pedro. His nickname was "Chick," and he lived at 1237 West Eighth Street, San Pedro.

== Career ==
His civic activities included presidencies of the San Pedro and Harbor District chambers of commerce and the San Pedro Rotary Club and San Pedro Shrine Club, as well as the general chairmanship of the Harbor District Community Chest. He was vice chairman of the Republican State Central Committee. He was a member of a committee that went to Washington, D.C., to lobby the federal government for a $7 million appropriation for a breakwater extension in the harbor.

=== City Council ===
Henning defeated James E. Dodson Jr. in the 1929 race for the City Council seat in the 15th District. He was reelected in 1931 over Frank McGinley, but lost in 1933 to Franklin Pierce Buyer. During his council service he was noted for taking the Pacific Electric Red Car to his office in the City Hall.

In January 1930, Henning and seven other council members who had voted in favor of granting a rock-crushing permit in the Santa Monica Mountains were unsuccessfully targeted for recall on the grounds that the eight

have conspired with . . . Alphonzo Bell, Samuel Traylor and Chapin A. Day, all multi-millionaires, to grant this group a special spot zoning permit to crush and ship . . . from the high-class residential section of Santa Monica, limestone and rock for cement.

Henning was one of the eight council members who in July 1931 voted against appealing a judge's decision ordering an end to racial restrictions in city-operated swimming pools, thus ending the practice. Six council members wanted to continue the legal fight. The pools had previously been restricted by race to certain days or hours.

Two years after his service as a councilman had ended, Henning was offered an appointment as investigator for the City Council, to succeed Tujunga newspaperman Carroll Parcher, but he turned down the job, and the same month the council decided to eliminate the position entirely.

=== Congressional bid ===
Henning was a candidate for Congress on the Republican ticket in 1932 but was defeated by Democrat Charles J. Colden, who had preceded him as 15th District City Council member in 1925–29.

=== State service ===
On August 25, 1934, Henning was appointed by State Controller Ray Riley as assistant disbursement officer of the State Emergency Relief Administration for Los Angeles County. In April 1937 he became chief of the Division of Parks, California Department of Natural Resources. He left for a time and then was reappointed in 1943. Henning resigned in 1950 and on the same day a company he operated submitted the best bid to operate the parking area at Huntington State Beach. Governor Earl Warren said lawyers were checking to see if there was any conflict of interest in the dealing.

== Personal life ==
Henning was married to Mary Francis Walker on December 23, 1916, in Watseka. They had two sons, Richard Edward and Robert W.

He was a Republican, an Episcopalian and a member of the Los Angeles Athletic Club and the Palos Verdes Country Club. In 1931 he was described as:

Not a large man physically, dapper and a neat dresser, Henning, although aggressive, has a pleasing personality. Catalina Island is his favorite playground and golf his favorite sport.

Henning's mother, Louise Henning, who lived at 2801 Third Street, Long Beach, died in 1945 at the age of 92 of burns she received in an accidental fire.

Preceded by Charles J. Colden	Los Angeles City Council; 15th District; 1931–33	Succeeded by Franklin Pierce Buyer
