= 1990 California Secretary of State election =

- November 6, 1990
- Turnout: 55.46%
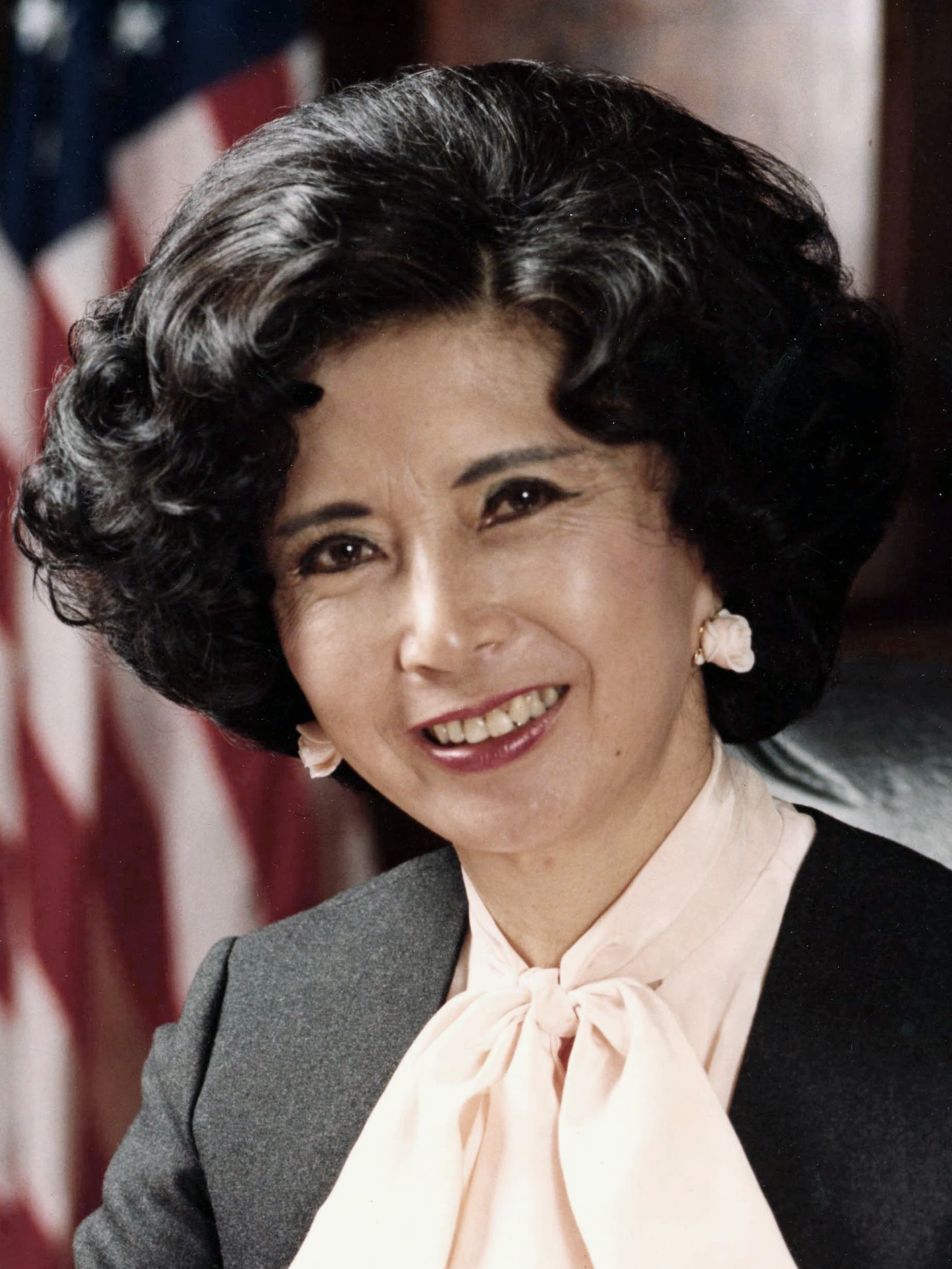

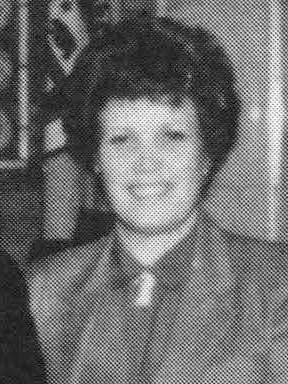
Nominee	March Fong Eu	Joan Milke Flores
Party	Democratic	Republican
Popular vote	3,864,151	3,032,755
Percentage	51.69%	40.57%
- County results Fong Eu: 40–50% 50–60% 60–70% 70–80% Flores: 40–50% 50–60%
Secretary of State before election
March Fong Eu
Democratic
Elected Secretary of State
March Fong Eu
Democratic

The 1990 California Secretary of State election was held on November 6, 1990, to elect the Secretary of State of California. Primary elections were held on June 5, 1990. Incumbent Democratic Secretary March Fong Eu was re-elected to her fifth term in office.

== Primary election ==
=== Democratic ===
==== Candidates ====
- March Fong Eu, Incumbent
- Mervin L. Evans

Democratic primary
Party	Candidate	Votes	%
Democratic	March Fong Eu (incumbent)	2,070,463	84.70
Democratic	Mervin L. Evans	374,155	15.31
Total votes		2,444,618	100.00

=== Republican ===
==== Candidates ====
- Joan Milke Flores, Los Angeles Councilwoman
- Gordon P. Levy

Republican primary
Party	Candidate	Votes	%
Republican	Joan Milke Flores	1,004,489	52.64
Republican	Gordon P. Levy	903,596	47.36
Total votes		1,908,085	100.00

=== Peace and Freedom ===
Peace and Freedom primary
Party	Candidate	Votes	%
Peace and Freedom	Evelina Alarcón	3,324	56.99
Peace and Freedom	Julie Fausto	2,509	43.01
Total votes		5,833	100.00

=== Other parties ===
Primary election
Party	Candidate	Votes	%
American Independent	Theodore Nicholoff	14,481	100.00
Libertarian	Kennita Watson	11,750	100.00

== General election ==
Final results from the Secretary of State of California.

1990 California Secretary of State election
Party	Candidate	Votes	%
Democratic	March Fong Eu (incumbent)	3,864,151	51.69
Republican	Joan Milke Flores	3,032,755	40.57
Libertarian	Kennita Watson	221,210	2.96
American Independent	Theodore Nicholoff	212,790	2.85
Peace and Freedom	Evelina Alarcón	144,577	1.93
Total votes		7,475,483	100.00
Democratic hold			
