= Joan Milke Flores =

American politician (1936–2020)

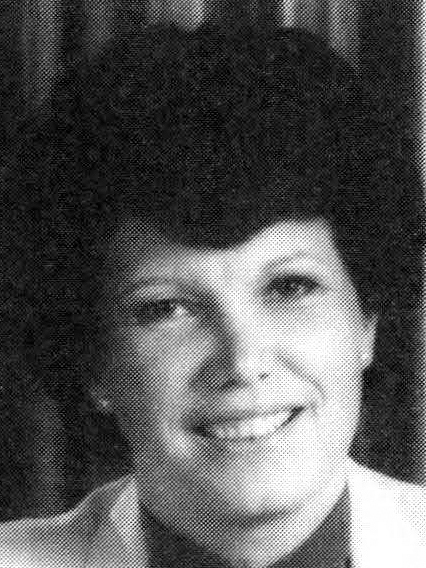
- Official portrait, 1986

Member of the Los Angeles City Council for the 15th district
- In office July 1, 1981 – June 30, 1993
- Preceded by: John S. Gibson Jr.
- Succeeded by: Rudy Svorinich

President Pro Tempore of the Los Angeles City Council
- In office July 1, 1985 – June 30, 1987
- Preceded by: John S. Gibson Jr.
- Succeeded by: Rudy Svorinich

Assistant President Pro Tempore of the Los Angeles City Council
- In office July 1, 1989 – June 30, 1993
- Preceded by: Ernani Bernardi
- Succeeded by: Richard Alatorre

Personal details
- Born: Joan Milke; May 9, 1936 Sheboygan Falls, Wisconsin, U.S.
- Died: December 19, 2020 (aged 84) San Pedro, California, California, U.S.
- Party: Republican
- Spouse: Sam Flores (divorced)
- Children: 1
- Occupation: Shorthand Stenographer
- Joan Milke Flores's voice Joan Milke Flores asking about the damages to the city during the 1992 Los Angeles riots Recorded April 30, 1992

Joan Milke Flores (May 9, 1936 – December 19, 2020) was an American politician, who served as a member of the Los Angeles City Council for the 15th district from 1981 to 1993. A member of the Republican Party in a largely Democratic body, she also served as the first freshman president pro tem in half a century. Milke Flores ran for California Secretary of State in 1990 and for a seat in the U.S. House of Representatives in 1992.

== Early life and education ==
Joan Milke was born May 9, 1936, in Sheboygan Falls, Wisconsin, into a family with German and French ancestry. Her father, a welder and machinist, or, as she described him, a jack of all trades, brought the family to Los Angeles when Joan was eight, and they settled in Highland Park, where Joan attended Luther Burbank Junior High School and Franklin High School. Joan had three sisters and a brother.

== Career ==
Milke worked part-time in high school and, after she graduated, she went to work in the City Hall in the stenographer's pool. She then became a clerk in the office of District 15 City Councilman John S. Gibson Jr. and worked her way up to become his chief deputy, a job she held for thirteen years. She retained her home in Highland Park until approximately 1979, when she moved into Gibson's district. Flores helped manage Gibson's final election campaign "and ran the office during his final term, when Gibson's health was suffering."

== Los Angeles City Council (1981–1993) ==
=== Elections ===
Councilman Gibson told Flores that he would not run for reelection in 1981 if she would be a candidate to succeed him, so she entered the race and won, 10,205 ballots against 9,943 for John Greenwood, her remaining opponent in the June final voting. It was said that Flores's support in Watts, coupled with endorsements from Gibson and from longtime County Supervisor Kenneth Hahn, was a deciding factor in the race. Though the balloting was nonpartisan, Flores was a Republican and Greenwood a Democrat.

In the 1985 race, Flores was reelected without opposition on the ballot, although she did face a write-in campaign by Joe E. Collins Jr., a 21-year-old computer operator, who said that Flores had "not gone far enough to address tough toxic-waste issues and to aid troubled areas like Wilmington and Watts." In 1989 she faced a tough race with six opponents, amid charges that she had neglected her district in favor of running for higher office (below). In 1993, she was defeated in a close race for reelection to the council by Rudy Svorinich.

=== Reputation ===
In the first term of her City Council career, Flores was elected by her colleagues to be president pro tem, a post third in line of importance to the Los Angeles mayor. She was "the first freshman in more than 50 years to be chosen for a council leadership position, and many supporters say the representative from District 15 is bound to go higher." She gained reputation "as one of the powerful and steadying forces on the 15-member council."

=== Positions ===
During her term on the Los Angeles City Council, she created the City's first Department of Environmental Affairs; introduced many water saving policies, including grey water recycling; and was a strong proponent of long-term conservation policies as well as pro-business policies. She was the long-time chair of the City's powerful Commerce and Natural Resources committee that oversaw the Departments of Airports, Harbor, and Water and Power.

Two "prominent achievements" were the creation in 1988 of a Wilmington branch library and $10 million worth of public improvements in the Wilmington Industrial Park. "She also fought for recognition of Harbor City and Harbor Gateway as distinct communities, worked to save pine trees in the Harbor Pines area and helped establish a day-laborer hiring program at Ken Malloy-Harbor Regional Park." She used her influence to get almost a million dollars in restoration of the historic Watts Train Station, and she helped create the Watts Friendship Sports League.

She also disagreed with Gibson, her predecessor, over his opposition to zoning, and spent timein implementing zoning plans "to counter the effects of his policies."

Los Angeles Times reporter Janet Clayton wrote of Flores:

One of the few registered Republicans on the council, Flores ... straddles the Pat Russell power bloc and other members of the council who are generally more conservative. She carefully tempers her conservative postures (strong police department supporter, anti rent control) to more liberal positions for matters of importance in her district (such as her support of a city holiday for Dr. Martin Luther King Jr.)

Some of Flores's other positions were:

- News media tax, 1983. Flores was one of three council members who unsuccessfully opposed adding a city tax on news media amounting to $1.25 for every $1,000 grossed by newspapers, radio and television stations, the others being Dave Cunningham and Gilbert Lindsay. The tax was opposed by the Los Angeles Times and the Los Angeles Herald-Examiner, who threatened to sue.
- Hazardous wastes, 1985. She requested that the City Council "change all permit applications—such as those for business licenses and industrial waste— to include information about the possible handling of hazardous wastes and materials." In addition, she sought the assignment of "trained, full-time inspectors" to monitor waste-related activities.
- Smoking, 1987. Flores submitted an ordinance aimed at curbing smoking in public places like restaurants, government buildings, sporting arenas, transportation facilities and schools. Some council members pressed for even more restrictive rules.
- Presidency, 1987. Flores made a bid for City Council presidency but was defeated when she could "muster only seven of the eight votes she needed to win."
- Hot coal, 1987. She appeared a press conference at the gates of the Los Angeles Harbor's bulk-loading facility, which, she complained, was inappropriately located in the harbor's recreational channel. The occasion was the emergency off-loading of a cargo of coal which had begun to heat up in the hold of a cargo ship on its way from New Orleans, Louisiana, to China. A Harbor Department official said the loading site would be repositioned elsewhere in the harbor district.
- Homeless housing, 1987. Flores announced that she had changed her mind about placing 12 trailers for homeless families at the Jordan Downs housing project in Watts because of the large number of vacant apartments in the project.
- Skateboards, bicycles, 1988. The councilwoman introduced a resolution, the city's first, to outlaw the use of skateboards and bicycles on sidewalks in San Pedro. Officials said it would set a precedent for the rest of the city.
- Metro Rail, 1992. She joined with four whistleblowers in calling for a federal investigation of mismanagement and shoddy work on Southern California Metro Rail transit projects.
- Rap Song, 1992. Flores introduced a motion into the City Council calling for Time Warner Inc. to voluntarily stop selling "Cop Killer," a rap song by Ice-T which she felt promoted the killing of police officers. Speaking of riots over the Rodney King incident, she said that it was "not responsible for record companies to be promoting songs that turn the heat up in Los Angeles right now."

== Later political involvement ==
=== 1990 California Secretary of State election ===
Republican Flores ran for California Secretary of State in 1990, losing to March Fong Eu, a Democrat. Flores drew attention when, "Trailing badly and eager to begin her television advertising campaign," she borrowed $275,000 from Ernest (Tom) Papadakis, a "wealthy friend and longtime political supporter" who owned a chain of liquor stores. Eu "accused Flores of deliberately concealing the loan by filing her financial disclosure statement several days late." Flores denied the charge. She was defeated by Eu, 51.7% to 41.6%.

=== 1992 United States congressional election ===
Flores ran in 1992 as the Republican nominee in California's 36th congressional district. She defeated Maureen Reagan, daughter of U.S. President Ronald Reagan, in the primary. Flores lost the general election to Democrat Jane Harman.

=== Lobbying ===
Flores began a lobbying firm that did business at the Los Angeles City Hall and at the State Capitol in Sacramento. In 1995 she was appointed to the Californias Border Environmental Cooperation Committee, an alliance between California and Baja California "to address common environmental issues in the border region." She resided in Penn Valley, California, before her death.

== Personal life ==
Milke was married for ten years to Sam Flores, a director with the Police Protective League. They had one daughter, Valerie, and were later divorced.

=== Death ===
Milke died on December 19, 2020, due to complications from myelodysplastic syndrome, as explained by her grandson, Trevor Davis.

Political offices
| Preceded by John S. Gibson, Jr. | Los Angeles City Council; 15th District; 1981—93 | Succeeded by Rudy Svorinich |
| Preceded by Peggy Stevenson | President Pro Tempore of the Los Angeles City Council; 1985—87 | Succeeded by Marvin Braude |
| Preceded by Ernani Bernardi | Assistant President Pro Tempore of the Los Angeles City Council; 1989—93 | Succeeded by Richard Alatorre |
