= Wilder W. Hartley =

American politician

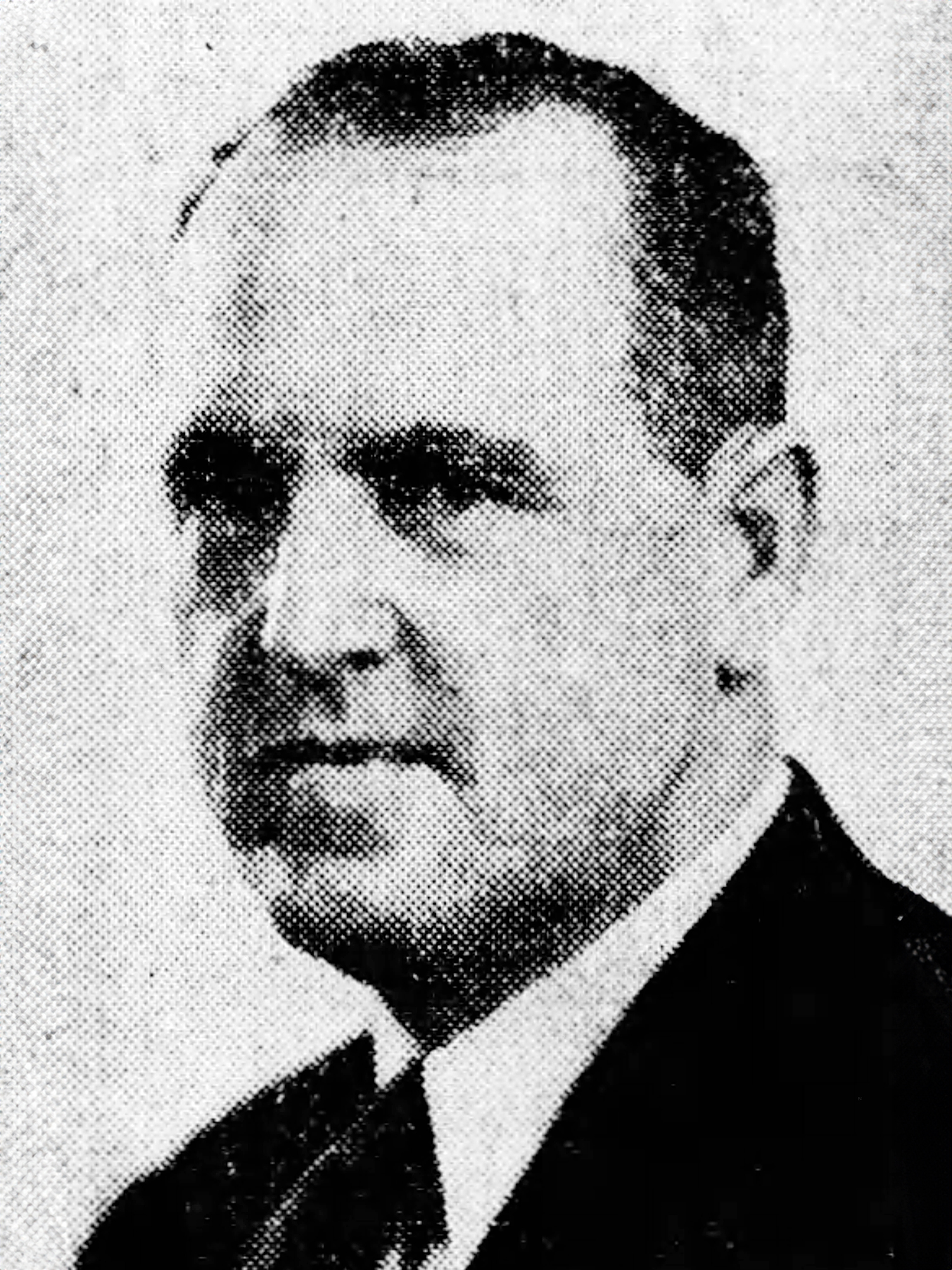

Member of the Los Angeles City Council from the 15th district
- In office July 1, 1939 – June 30, 1943
- Preceded by: Franklin Pierce Buyer
- Succeeded by: George H. Moore

Personal details
- Born: April 4, 1901 Reno, Nevada
- Died: August 17, 1970 (aged 69) Harbor City, Los Angeles
- Party: Republican

Wilder Wellington Hartley (April 4, 1901 – August 17, 1970) was a member of the Los Angeles City Council from the Harbor and South Los Angeles districts from 1939 to 1943.

== Biography ==
Hartley was born in Reno, Nevada, on April 4, 1901, and was brought to Wilmington, California, in 1903, where his father became chief engineer for the Hammond Lumber Company. Wilder attended Wilmington High School and Stanford University. He worked for Hammond for a time and then went into the insurance business. In 1924 he and Laura Mae Clark were married. Hartley was a Republican.

Hartley died at the age of 69 on August 17, 1970, in Harbor City, leaving his wife and three daughters, Marilyn Swanson, Ann Wilmoth and Joyce Christiansen. He was buried in San Pedro.

== City Council ==
=== Elections ===
Hartley ran against Franklin Pierce Buyer, the incumbent member for Los Angeles City Council District 15, in 1939 and was elected in the final vote. Buyer challenged Hartley again in 1941 but was defeated in the final. Two years later, in 1943, Hartley was ousted by George H. Moore in the primary, and the same Hartley-Moore matchup had the same result in 1945. Hartley tried against Moore for the last time in 1947 but was defeated in the final vote.

=== Positions ===
Hitchhikers (1940). Hartley proposed a law against hitchhiking. The Los Angeles Times reported:

Efforts of women drivers to escape the importunities of hitchhikers cause them to drive through traffic signals, creating a traffic hazard, Hartley asserted. Councilman Arthur E. Briggs declared such drivers would go through signals anyhow. He said he couldn't see why drivers did not have sufficient willpower not to pick up hikers if they did not want to.

Ex-Communist (1940). Hartley joined the 9–4 majority of the council in asking Mayor Fletcher Bowron to remove a former Communist, labor leader Don Healy, from a city charter revision committee that Bowron had appointed months previously. "Communists don't change overnight," Hartley said, referring to Healy's switch in registration from Communist to Democratic.

Mayor (1940). He was appointed to a committee of five council members to call on Bowron to complain about "persistent and erroneous" remarks the mayor made about the council in his radio addresses.

Servicemen (1943). He suggested that "spacious City Hall rooms" might be set aside at night for emergency sleeping quarters for servicemen "instead of having them walking the streets, sleeping in parks or telephone booths due to lack of hotel rooms."

| Preceded by F.P. Buyer | Los Angeles City Council; 15th District; 1939–43 | Succeeded by George H. Moore |
