= Wetmore, Kansas =

City in Nemaha County, Kansas

- City
- Location within Nemaha County and Kansas

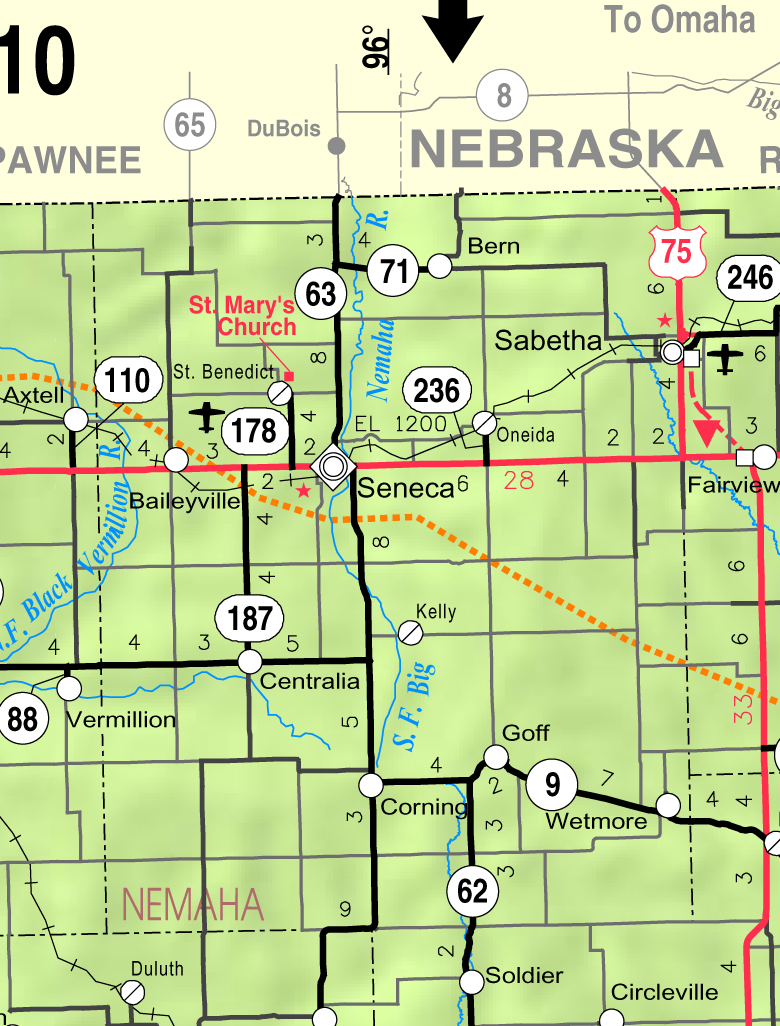
- KDOT map of Nemaha County (legend)
- Coordinates: 39°38′08″N 95°48′41″W
- Country: United States
- State: Kansas
- County: Nemaha
- Founded: 1866
- Incorporated: 1882
- Named for: W.T. Wetmore

Area
  - Total: 0.39 sq mi (1.00 km^{2})
  - Land: 0.39 sq mi (1.00 km^{2})
  - Water: 0 sq mi (0.00 km^{2})
- Elevation: 1,155 ft (352 m)

Population (2020)
  - Total: 348
  - Density: 901/sq mi (348/km^{2})
- Time zone: UTC-6 (CST)
  - Summer (DST): UTC-5 (CDT)
- ZIP Code: 66550
- Area code: 785
- FIPS code: 20-77550
- GNIS ID: 2397289
- Website: cityofwetmoreks.org

Wetmore is a city in Nemaha County, Kansas, United States. As of the 2020 census, the population of the city was 348.

== History ==
Wetmore was founded in 1866 by the railroad company. It was named to honor W.T. Wetmore, a vice president of the Central Branch Union Pacific Railroad. Wetmore was incorporated in 1882.

== Geography ==
According to the United States Census Bureau, the city has a total area of 0.39 square miles (1.01 km^{2}), all land.

== Demographics ==
Historical population
Census	Pop.	Note	%±
1880	340		—
1890	522		53.5%
1900	434		−16.9%
1910	483		11.3%
1920	500		3.5%
1930	452		−9.6%
1940	425		−6.0%
1950	397		−6.6%
1960	390		−1.8%
1970	392		0.5%
1980	376		−4.1%
1990	284		−24.5%
2000	362		27.5%
2010	368		1.7%
2020	348		−5.4%
U.S. Decennial Census

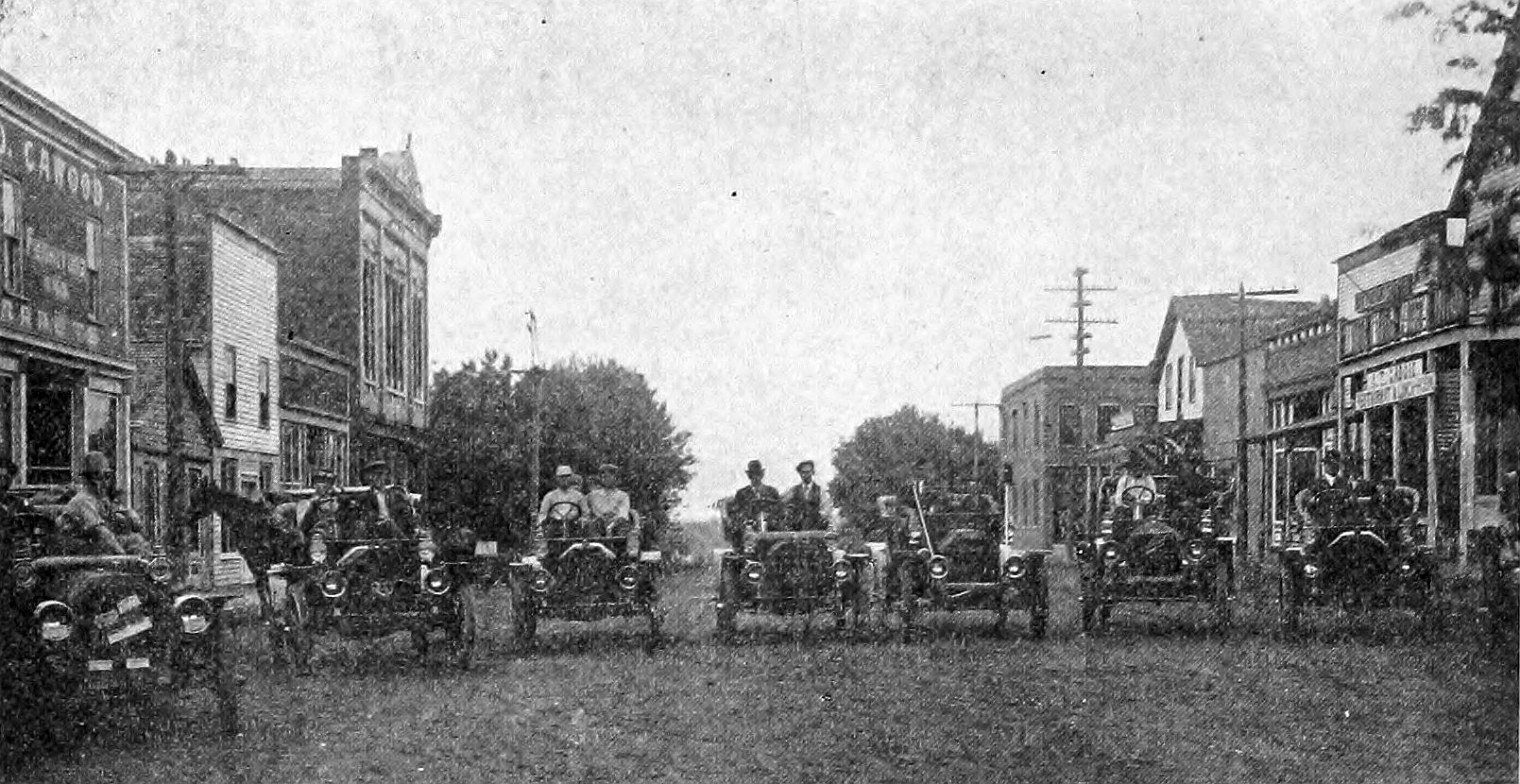
Wetmore (1916)

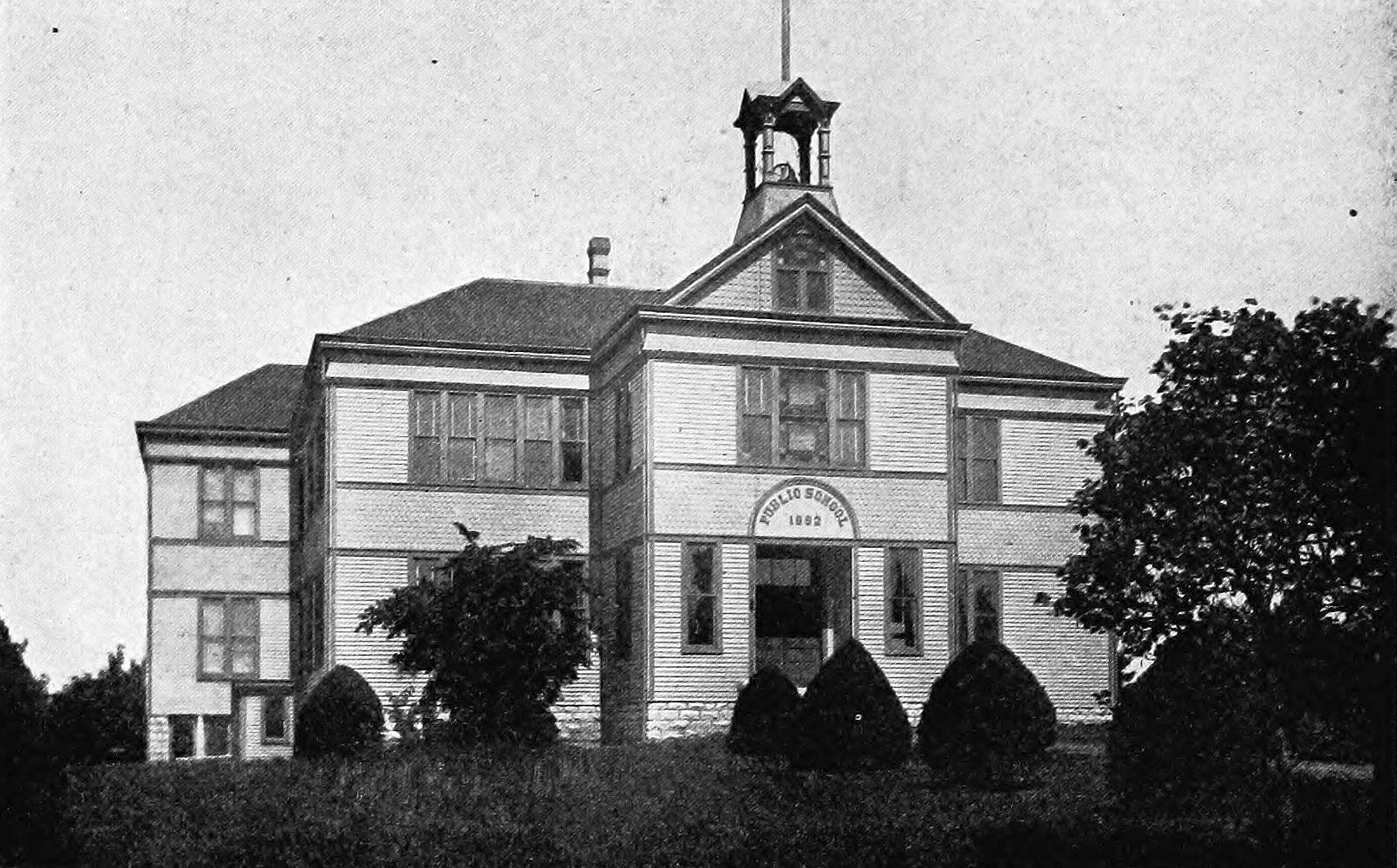
Public school in Wetmore (1916)

=== 2010 census ===
As of the census of 2010, there were 368 people, 140 households, and 89 families residing in the city. The population density was 943.6 inhabitants per square mile (364.3/km^{2}). There were 152 housing units at an average density of 389.7 per square mile (150.5/km^{2}). The racial makeup of the city was 96.7% White, 0.3% African American, 1.9% Native American, and 1.1% from two or more races. Hispanic or Latino of any race were 1.9% of the population.

There were 140 households, of which 37.9% had children under the age of 18 living with them, 47.1% were married couples living together, 10.0% had a female householder with no husband present, 6.4% had a male householder with no wife present, and 36.4% were non-families. 30.7% of all households were made up of individuals, and 14.3% had someone living alone who was 65 years of age or older. The average household size was 2.63 and the average family size was 3.26.

The median age in the city was 31.5 years. 31% of residents were under the age of 18; 7.1% were between the ages of 18 and 24; 27.2% were from 25 to 44; 21% were from 45 to 64; and 13.9% were 65 years of age or older. The gender makeup of the city was 49.7% male and 50.3% female.

=== 2000 census ===
As of the census of 2000, there were 362 people, 139 households, and 97 families residing in the city. The population density was 943.6 inhabitants per square mile (364.3/km^{2}). There were 156 housing units at an average density of 406.6 per square mile (157.0/km^{2}). The racial makeup of the city was 98.90% White, 0.55% Native American, and 0.55% from two or more races. Hispanic or Latino of any race were 0.28% of the population.

There were 139 households, out of which 33.1% had children under the age of 18 living with them, 56.1% were married couples living together, 10.1% had a female householder with no husband present, and 30.2% were non-families. 27.3% of all households were made up of individuals, and 12.2% had someone living alone who was 65 years of age or older. The average household size was 2.60 and the average family size was 3.19.

In the city, the population was spread out, with 30.7% under the age of 18, 6.6% from 18 to 24, 27.3% from 25 to 44, 18.0% from 45 to 64, and 17.4% who were 65 years of age or older. The median age was 36 years. For every 100 females, there were 92.6 males. For every 100 females age 18 and over, there were 87.3 males.

The median income for a household in the city was $38,438, and the median income for a family was $47,500. Males had a median income of $31,500 versus $24,375 for females. The per capita income for the city was $15,791. About 6.1% of families and 8.6% of the population were below the poverty line, including 7.1% of those under age 18 and 20.9% of those age 65 or over.

== Education ==
The community is served by Prairie Hills USD 113 public school district, formed in 2010 by the merger of Sabetha USD 441 and Axtell USD 488.

== Notable people ==
- Lee E. Geyer, former congressman of California's 17th congressional district
- Zip Zabel, Major League Baseball relief pitcher for the Chicago Cubs
