= Browns, Illinois =

- Village
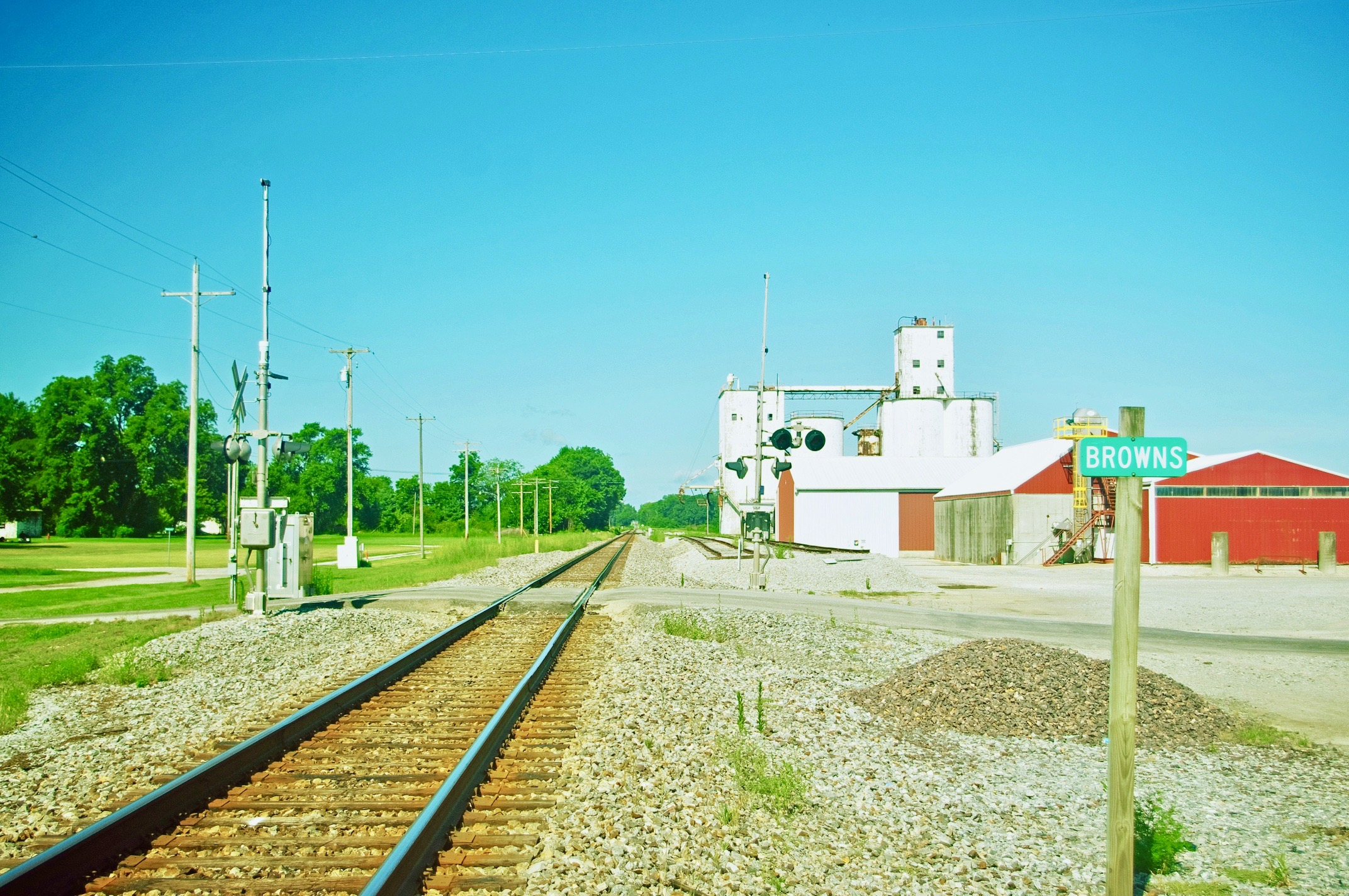
- Railroad tracks in Browns

- Location of Browns in Edwards County, Illinois.
- Coordinates: 38°22′39″N 87°58′59″W
- Country: United States
- State: Illinois
- County: Edwards

Area
  - Total: 0.29 sq mi (0.75 km^{2})
  - Land: 0.29 sq mi (0.75 km^{2})
  - Water: 0 sq mi (0.00 km^{2})
- Elevation: 397 ft (121 m)

Population (2020)
  - Total: 139
  - Density: 479.8/sq mi (185.25/km^{2})
- Time zone: UTC-6 (CST)
  - Summer (DST): UTC-5 (CDT)
- Zip code: 62818
- Area code: 618
- FIPS code: 17-08979
- GNIS ID: 2397472

Browns is a village in Edwards County, Illinois, United States. The population was 139 as of the 2020 census, slightly up from 134 as of the 2010 census.

== History ==
Few records of the early history are available because the first books were destroyed by fire. Recorded history of Browns begins in 1880 when John Henderson and his wife Emma had the present site surveyed into blocks, streets, lots and alleys and named it "Frazier".

On May 7, 1892, a petition was filed asking that an election be held to incorporate the site as the village of Browns, apparently in honor of John L. Brown, a prominent citizen of that name. The election was held on May 24 of that year and carried narrowly, 31 to 27. In 1887, the new Browns community put in a serious bid to become the new County seat of Edwards County. The citizens of the existing county seat, Albion, hurriedly built a new courthouse to beat off the threat.

The village of Browns is a "dry" community and has been since the Prohibition days.

== Geography ==
Browns is located on the eastern border of Edwards County. The eastern village limit is Bonpas Creek, which forms the Wabash County line. Illinois Route 15 passes just north of the village, leading west 4 miles (6 km) to Albion, the Edwards County seat, and east 13 miles (21 km) to Mount Carmel.

According to the 2010 census, Browns has a total area of 0.29 square miles (0.75 km^{2}), all land.

== Demographics ==
Historical population
Census	Pop.	Note	%±
1900	421		—
1910	419		−0.5%
1920	388		−7.4%
1930	302		−22.2%
1940	337		11.6%
1950	336		−0.3%
1960	251		−25.3%
1970	198		−21.1%
1980	213		7.6%
1990	207		−2.8%
2000	175		−15.5%
2010	134		−23.4%
2020	139		3.7%
U.S. Decennial Census

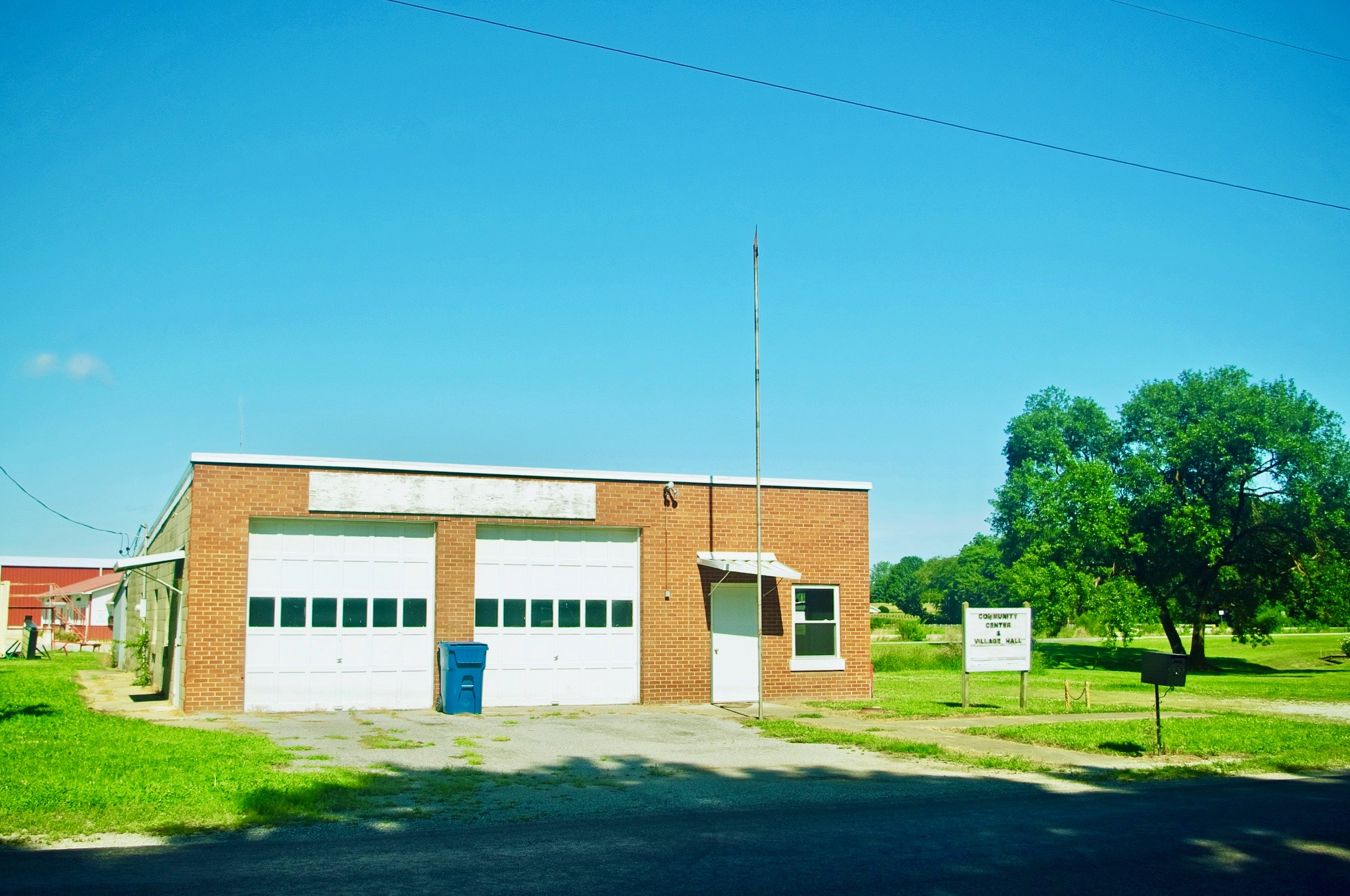
Browns Village Hall

As of the 2020 census there were 139 people, 91 households, and 57 families residing in the village. The population density was 479.31 inhabitants per square mile (185.06/km^{2}). There were 67 housing units at an average density of 231.03 per square mile (89.20/km^{2}). The racial makeup of the village was 99.28% White and 0.72% African American. Hispanic or Latino of any race were 0.72% of the population.

There were 91 households, out of which 28.6% had children under the age of 18 living with them, 54.95% were married couples living together, 5.49% had a female householder with no husband present, and 37.36% were non-families. 21.98% of all households were made up of individuals, and 12.09% had someone living alone who was 65 years of age or older. The average household size was 3.00 and the average family size was 2.48.

The village's age distribution consisted of 26.1% under the age of 18, 4.4% from 18 to 24, 18.6% from 25 to 44, 38% from 45 to 64, and 12.8% who were 65 years of age or older. The median age was 46.0 years. For every 100 females, there were 107.3 males. For every 100 females age 18 and over, there were 106.2 males.

The median income for a household in the village was $63,125, and the median income for a family was $76,750. Males had a median income of $47,125 versus $30,208 for females. The per capita income for the village was $26,477. About 5.3% of families and 16.4% of the population were below the poverty line, including 8.5% of those under age 18 and 6.9% of those age 65 or over.

== Notable person ==
- Franklin P. Buyer, member of the Los Angeles City Council (1933–1939), attended school in Browns
