= Los Angeles's 15th City Council district =

American legislative district

Councilmember
Tim McOsker; D–San Pedro
since December 12, 2022
- Demographics: 18.5% White; 11.5% Black; 60.7% Hispanic; 5.9% Asian; 0.8% Other
- Population (2022): 258,310
- Registered voters (2017): 123,866
- Website: cd15.lacity.gov

Los Angeles's 15th City Council district is one of the fifteen districts in the Los Angeles City Council. It is currently represented by Democrat Tim McOsker since 2022, after previous member Joe Buscaino retired to run for mayor that year.

The district was created in 1925 after a new city charter was passed, which replaced the former "at large" voting system for a nine-member council with a district system with a 15-member council. Not only geographically, but also representationally the district has been one of the most stable. There have been only eleven council members since 1925 and none have served fewer than four years. The thirty-year incumbency of John S. Gibson Jr. was the third-longest of any Los Angeles City Council member, after Ernani Bernardi of the 7th District and John Ferraro of the 4th District.

The district has primarily been represented by residents of San Pedro, which has outsized influence as the district's traditional base of political power. Eight of the eleven council members who have represented the district have come from San Pedro.

== Geography ==
The 15th district encompasses all of the city's southern area and the Port of Los Angeles, which includes the communities and neighborhoods of Harbor City, Harbor Gateway, San Pedro, Watts, and Wilmington.

The district overlaps with California's 43rd and 44th congressional districts. It also overlaps with California's 35th State Senate district and a part of the State Senate's 30th district, as well as California's 64th, 66th, and 70th State Assembly districts.

=== Historical boundaries ===
The historical boundaries does not differ from the modern boundaries, with the main difference being the northern border. At its creation, it was at Slauson Avenue, before moving down to Manchester Avenue in 1928. In 1933, the major eastern boundaries of the shoestring are Figueroa Street and Normandie Avenue and western limits are Western and Vermont avenues, before some parts of South Broadway being absorbed in District 8 by 1935. In 1986, the boundary moved south, but district still included part of the Watts area. In 2011, it was now south of Century Boulevard on the west edge of the Shoestring, north of the boulevard to the east.

In 2017, the Los Angeles Times editorial board criticized the geographical makeup of the district, and argued that it resulted in lack of representation for communities like Watts and Harbor Gateway. The editorial argued that the district's representative, Joe Buscaino, was being re-elected exclusively by the people of San Pedro, meaning that Buscaino is beholden only to this small community.

== List of members representing the district ==
Councilmember	Party	Dates	Electoral history
District established July 1, 1925
Charles J. Colden (San Pedro)	Democratic	July 1, 1925 – June 30, 1929	Elected in 1925. Re-elected in 1927. Retired to run for Mayor of Los Angeles.
A. E. Henning (San Pedro)	Republican	July 1, 1929 – June 30, 1933	Elected in 1929. Re-elected in 1931. Lost re-election.
Franklin P. Buyer (Broadway-Manchester)	Democratic	July 1, 1933 – June 30, 1939	Elected in 1933. Re-elected in 1935. Re-elected in 1937. Lost re-election.
Wilder W. Hartley (Wilmington)	Republican	July 1, 1939 – June 30, 1943	Elected in 1939. Re-elected in 1941. Lost re-election.
George H. Moore (Wilmington)	Democratic	July 1, 1943 – June 30, 1951	Elected in 1943. Re-elected in 1945. Re-elected in 1947. Re-elected in 1949. Lost re-election.
John S. Gibson Jr. (San Pedro)	Democratic	July 1, 1951 – June 30, 1981	Elected in 1951. Re-elected in 1953. Re-elected in 1957. Re-elected in 1961. Re-elected in 1965. Re-elected in 1969. Re-elected in 1973. Re-elected in 1977. Retired.
Joan M. Flores (San Pedro)	Republican	July 1, 1981 – June 30, 1993	Elected in 1981. Re-elected in 1987. Re-elected in 1989. Lost re-election.
Rudy Svorinich (San Pedro)	Republican	July 1, 1993 – June 30, 2001	Elected in 1993. Re-elected in 1997. Retired due to term limits.
Janice Hahn (San Pedro)	Democratic	July 1, 2001 – June 12, 2011	Elected in 2001. Re-elected in 2005. Re-elected in 2009. Resigned when elected to the U.S. House of Representatives.
Vacant		June 12, 2011 – January 17, 2012	
Joe Buscaino (San Pedro)	Democratic	January 17, 2012 – December 12, 2022	Elected to finish Hahn's term. Re-elected in 2013. Re-elected in 2017. Retired to run for Mayor of Los Angeles.
Tim McOsker (San Pedro)	Democratic	December 12, 2022 – present	Elected in 2022. Re-elected in 2026.
