= Edward Hawkins (disambiguation) =

Edward Hawkins (1789–1882) was an English churchman and academic.

Edward Hawkins may also refer to:

- Edward Hawkins (architect) (1902–1991), designer and developer of Unosian residential houses
- Edward Hawkins (New York politician) (1829–1908), New York politician
- Edward Hawkins (numismatist) (1780–1867), English numismatist and antiquary

== See also ==
- Ed Hawkins (disambiguation)
