= Chamber of Commerce Building (Steamboat Springs, Colorado) =

Historic building in Colorado, United States

- U.S. National Register of Historic Places
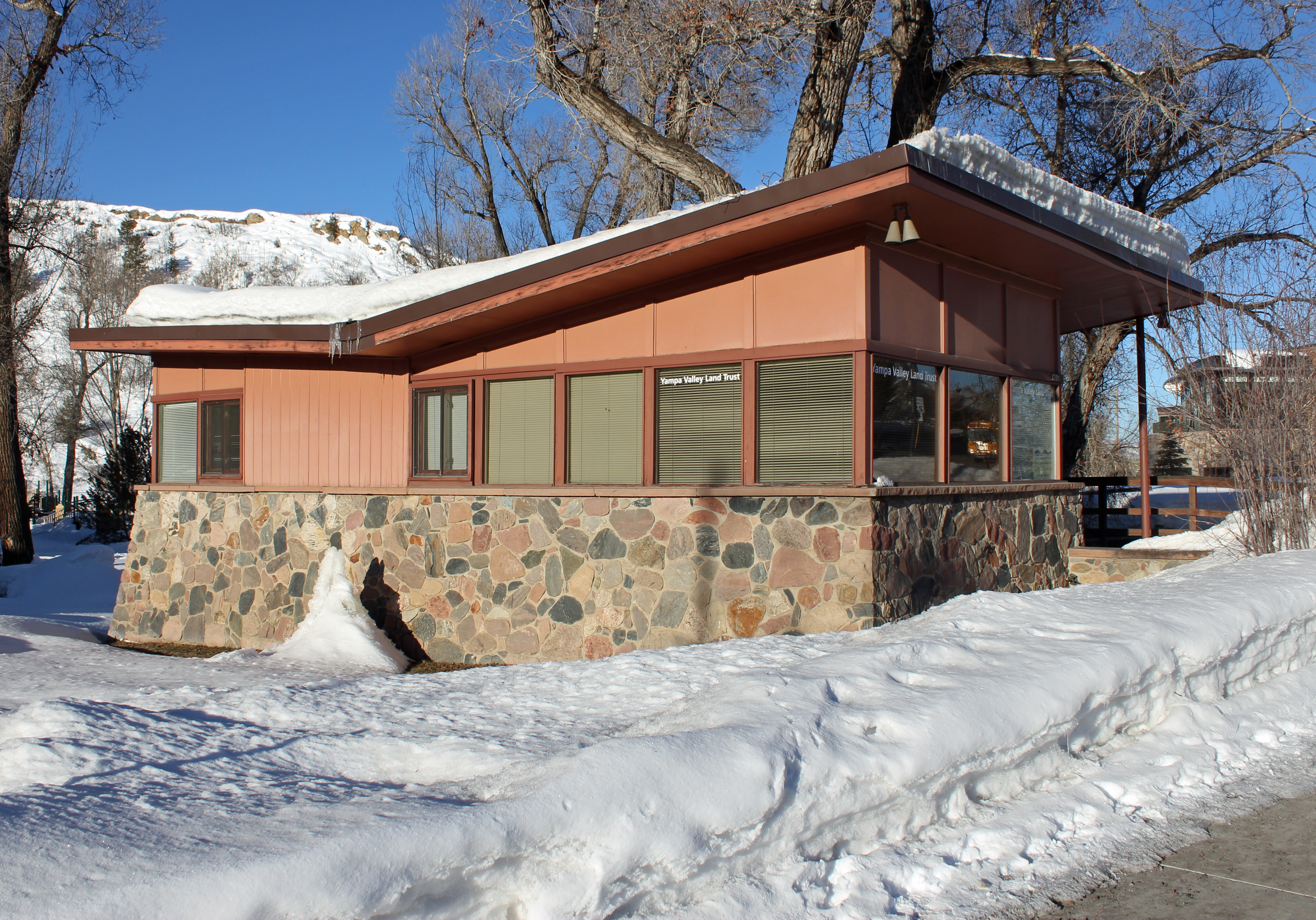

- Location within Colorado Location within the United States
- Location: 1201 Lincoln Ave., Steamboat Springs, Colorado
- Coordinates: 40°29′20″N 106°50′21″W
- Area: less than one acre
- Built: 1960
- Architect: Sternberg, Eugene D.
- Architectural style: Modern Movement, Usonian
- NRHP reference No.: 08001010
- Added to NRHP: April 16, 2010

The Chamber of Commerce Building in Steamboat Springs, Colorado, at 1201 Lincoln Ave., is a Modern Movement-style building that was designed by architect Eugene D. Sternberg and was built in 1960. Its 2009 application for NRHP listing describes it as "an unusual application of the Usonian housing style to a commercial building. It has an inverted gable roof which gives rise to it being known locally as the butterfly building. The roof accommodates cottonwood tree trunks growing through a hole in its overhang.

It served the Steamboat Springs Chamber of Commerce through at least 1973. In 2009 it housed the Yampa Valley Land Trust.

It was listed on the Colorado Register of Historic Places in 2009 and the National Register of Historic Places in 2010.
