= Edward Hawkins (architect) =

Edward B. Hawkins
- Born: 1902; Denver, Colorado, United States
- Died: 1991 (aged 88–89); Vista, California, California, United States
- Education: Colorado State Agricultural College (now Colorado State University)
- Occupations: Architect, developer, builder
- Known for: Arapahoe Acres and Usonian-style housing
- Spouse: Charlotte Hawkins

Edward Hawkins (1902–1991) was an American architect, developer, and builder in Colorado. Inspired by Frank Lloyd Wright, he designed houses of the Usonian-style architecture for his Arapahoe Acres development in Englewood, Colorado. He also began development of the Arapahoe Hills neighborhood.

== Early life and education ==
Edward B. Hawkins was born in Denver, Colorado in 1902. He graduated from East High School and studied civil engineering in Fort Collins at Colorado State Agricultural College, now Colorado State University. He studied the work of Frank Lloyd Wright's residential design.

== Career ==
He worked for Home Builders of America in Chicago as a building superintendent beginning in 1924. He also was a general contractor on the side. During the Great Depression, he worked for the Civilian Conservation Corps (CCC) building picnic areas, fireplaces, and roads.

During World War II, Hawkins worked at the Rocky Mountain Arsenal as a civilian. He also began to design and building houses. He built 35 modern houses in northeast Denver between 1942 and 1949. He established Construction Products Company in Lakewood, Colorado to prefabricate portions of the house that were assembled at the housing site. He manufactured aluminum-frame windows for the houses he developed and for sale to other home builders.

In August 1949, he began development the Arapahoe Acres neighborhood in Englewood. The houses display characteristics of Usonian and International Style architecture. He was accepted by a national program developed by the Southwest Research Institute and the Revere Copper and Brass Company to advance "better architect-builder relations and the general improvement of the quality of speculatively built houses", which focused on livable, cost-effective housing. He hired architect Eugene Sternberg to develop construction plans and design houses for the neighborhood. Hawkins relocated his pre-fabrication construction shop to be closer to the new development. Houses are oriented for privacy, solar heating, and mountain views. Streets are curvilinear to reduce through traffic. The houses had modern appliances, fireplaces, and used Revere Copper and Brass products. Heating systems were a combination of radiant floor heat and force air heat. Among the press received for the development, Life magazine featured Arapahoe Acres in "Best Houses under $15,000; Eight fine, mass-produced examples show buyers what they can get in low-priced homes." After the initial model home was sold for more than $11,500 agreed upon between Hawkins and Sternberg, Sternberg ended the collaborative effort and Hawkins designed all but about 20 houses for the development. Sternberg favored the International Style. Hawkins designed about 70 larger houses in the Usonian style of Frank Lloyd Wright, using natural stone, wood sunscreens and louvers, and glass as a design element. Construction was completed in 1957. Hawkins lived and worked in Arapahoe Acres.

He then began development on Arapahoe Hills, which was completed by business partner and contractor Clyde Mannon.

== Personal life ==
Hawkins was married by 1942 to Charlotte. They retired in 1967 to Vista, California, where he designed his retirement home in a Japanese style. They spent eight years traveling internationally. He died in 1991 and Charlotte died four years later.
