= Arapahoe Acres =

- U.S. National Register of Historic Places
- U.S. Historic district
- Colorado State Register of Historic Properties
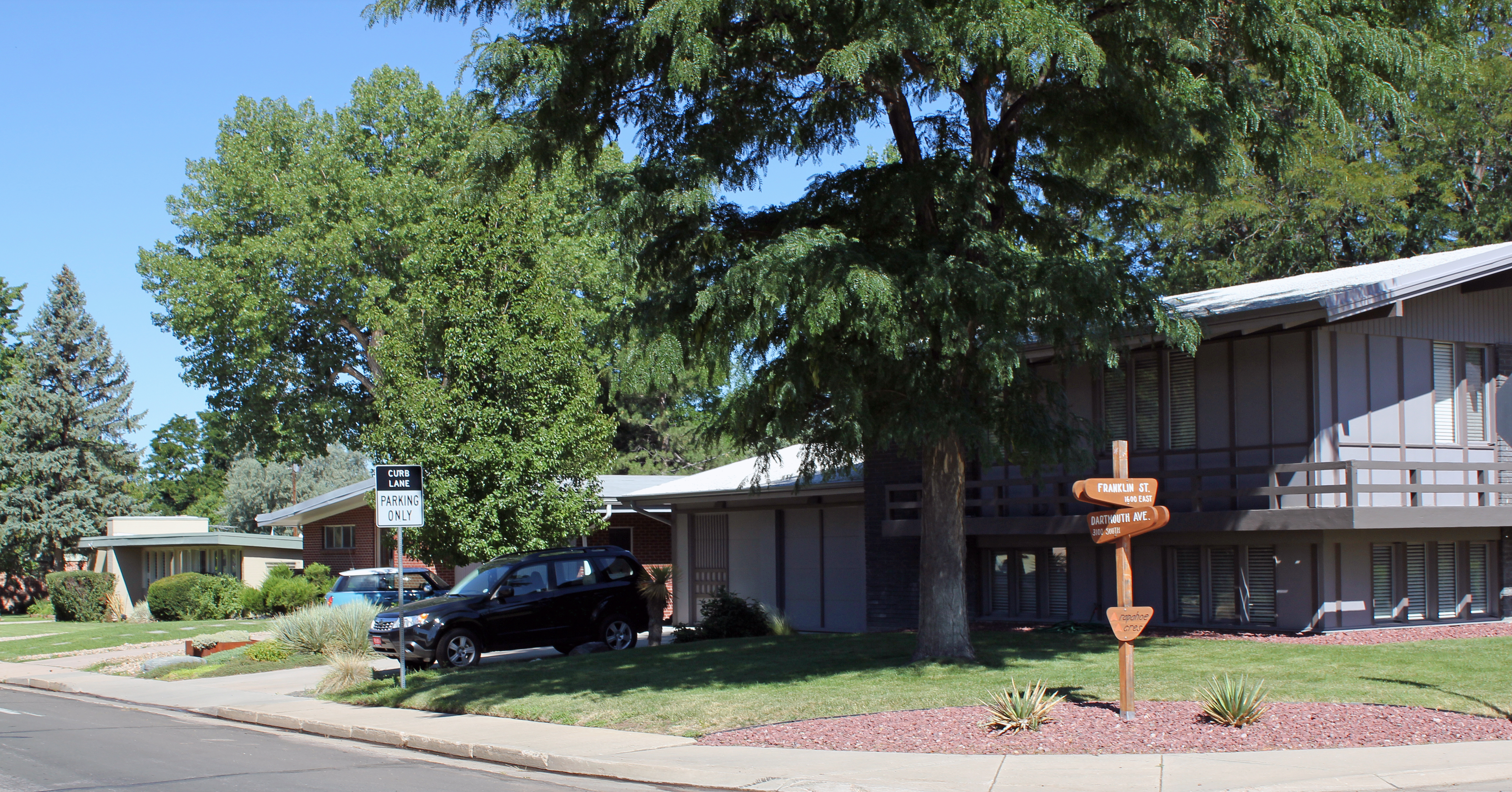

- Location within Colorado Location within the United States
- Nearest city: Englewood, Arapahoe County, Colorado
- Coordinates: 39°39′44″N 104°58′13″W
- Area: 30 acres (12 ha)
- Architect: Edward Hawkins, Eugene Sternberg, Joseph Dion
- Architectural style: International and Usonian
- NRHP reference No.: 98001249
- CSRHP No.: 5AH.1434
- Added to NRHP: November 3, 1998

Arapahoe Acres is a neighborhood bounded by East Bates, East Dartmouth Avenues, South Marion, South Franklin Streets in Englewood, Colorado. Built from 1949 to 1957 it provides examples of new patterns developed for residential neighborhoods after World War II.

== History ==
Edward Hawkins, a local pioneer in modern residential development and construction, was the developer, overall designer of the neighborhood, and builder of the Arapahoe Acres neighborhood. He also designed most of the houses, which display characteristics of Usonian and International Style architecture. Architects Eugene Sternberg and Joseph Dion also designed houses for Arapahoe Acres.

Hawkins was accepted by a national program developed by the Southwest Research Institute and the Revere Copper and Brass Company to advance "better architect-builder relations and the general improvement of the quality of speculatively built houses", which focused on livable, cost-effective housing. He hired architect Eugene Sternberg to develop construction plans and design houses for the neighborhood. Houses are oriented for privacy, solar heating, and mountain views. Streets are curvilinear to reduce through traffic. The houses had modern appliances, fireplaces, and used Revere Copper and Brass products. Heating systems were a combination of radiant floor heat and force air heat. Among the press received for the development, Life magazine featured Arapahoe Acres in "Best Houses under $15,000; Eight fine, mass-produced examples show buyers what they can get in low-priced homes." After the initial model home was sold for more than $11,500 agreed upon between Hawkins and Sternberg, Sternberg ended the collaborative effort and Hawkins designed all but about 20 houses for the development. Sternberg favored the International Style. Hawkins designed about 70 larger houses in the Usonian style of Frank Lloyd Wright, using natural stone, wood sunscreens and louvers, and glass as a design element. Construction was completed in 1957.

== See also ==
- National Register of Historic Places listings in Arapahoe County, Colorado
