= Kelly, Kansas =

Unincorporated community in Nemaha County, Kansas

- CDP
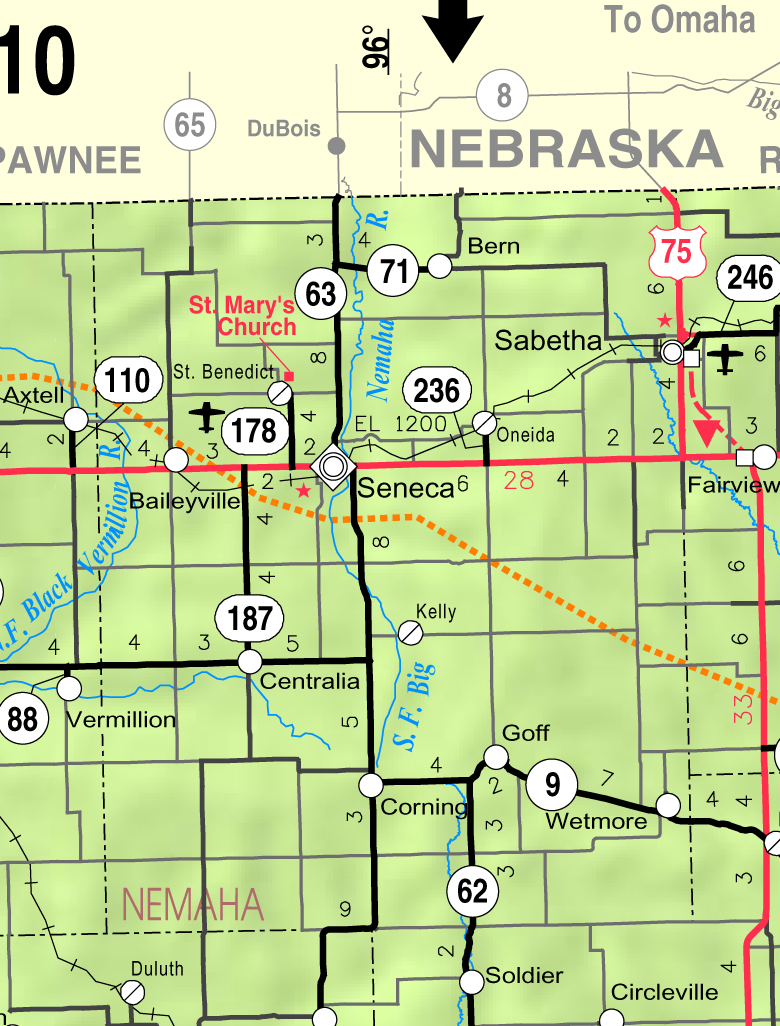
- KDOT map of Nemaha County (legend)

- Location within Kansas Location within the United States
- Coordinates: 39°44′12″N 96°00′02″W
- Country: United States
- State: Kansas
- County: Nemaha
- Elevation: 1,243 ft (379 m)

Population (2020)
  - Total: 27
- Time zone: UTC-6 (CST)
  - Summer (DST): UTC-5 (CDT)
- Area code: 785
- FIPS code: 20-36375
- GNIS ID: 2804516

Kelly is a census-designated place (CDP) in Nemaha County, Kansas, United States. As of the 2020 census, the population was 27.

== History ==
Kelly got its start in the early 1880's following construction of the Kansas City, Wyandotte and Northwestern Railroad through the area. The railroad, continuously troubled financially, was reorganized around 1915 as the Kansas City, Wichita and Northwestern Railway. Continued financial trouble led to the line being sold to Missouri Pacific, which promptly shut the line down. Rail service was stopped in 1919, and the line was dismantled in the early 1920's.

A post office was opened in Kelly in 1888, and remained in operation until it was discontinued in 1988.

== Demographics ==
Historical population
Census	Pop.	Note	%±
2020	27		—
U.S. Decennial Census

The 2020 United States census counted 27 people, 13 households, and 13 families in Kelly. The population density was 112.0 per square mile (43.3/km^{2}). There were 14 housing units at an average density of 58.1 per square mile (22.4/km^{2}). The racial makeup was 51.85% (14) white or European American (51.85% non-Hispanic white), 0.0% (0) black or African-American, 0.0% (0) Native American or Alaska Native, 0.0% (0) Asian, 0.0% (0) Pacific Islander or Native Hawaiian, 25.93% (7) from other races, and 22.22% (6) from two or more races. Hispanic or Latino of any race was 48.15% (13) of the population.

Of the 13 households, 46.2% had children under the age of 18; 84.6% were married couples living together; 7.7% had a female householder with no spouse or partner present. 0.0% of households consisted of individuals and 0.0% had someone living alone who was 65 years of age or older. The percent of those with a bachelor's degree or higher was estimated to be 0.0% of the population.

14.8% of the population was under the age of 18, 7.4% from 18 to 24, 51.9% from 25 to 44, 14.8% from 45 to 64, and 11.1% who were 65 years of age or older. The median age was 35.8 years. For every 100 females, there were 92.9 males. For every 100 females ages 18 and older, there were 109.1 males.

== Education ==
The community is served by Nemaha Central USD 115 public school district.

== Notable people ==
- William S. Hill, Former U.S. Representative.
