= Byron L. Johnson =

American politician

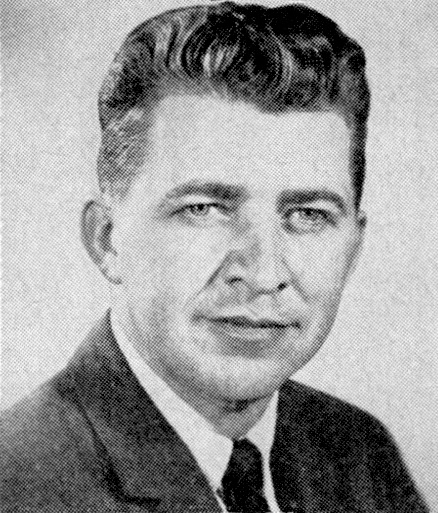

Member of the U.S. House of Representatives from Colorado's 2nd district
- In office January 3, 1959 – January 3, 1961
- Preceded by: William S. Hill
- Succeeded by: Peter Dominick

Member of the Colorado House of Representatives
- In office 1955-1956

Personal details
- Born: Byron Lindbergh Johnson; October 12, 1917 Chicago, Illinois, U.S.
- Died: January 6, 2000 (aged 82) Englewood, Colorado, U.S.
- Resting place: Fairmount Cemetery
- Party: Democratic
- Occupation: Economist

Byron Lindberg Johnson (October 12, 1917 – January 6, 2000) was an American educator, economist and politician who served one term as a U.S. representative from Colorado from 1959 to 1961.

== Early life and education ==
Born in Chicago, Illinois, all four of Johnson's grandparents were Swedish immigrants. He graduated from Oconomowoc High School, Oconomowoc, Wisconsin, in 1933. He earned his B.A. at University of Wisconsin–Madison in 1938, and completed his M.A. (1940) and Ph.D. (1947) at University of Wisconsin–Madison as well. He married Catherine (Kay) Teter, of Milwaukee, Wisconsin, in October, 1938.

== Career as an economist and housing developer ==
Johnson was an economist for the Wisconsin State Board of Health from 1938 to 1942. He served as staff member on the U.S. Bureau of Budget from 1942 to 1944, and of the Social Security Administration in Washington, D.C. from 1944 to 1947. He was a professor at the University of Denver from 1947 to 1956.

Johnson was a co-founder and organizer of the Mile High Housing Association, a cooperative-housing membership group that acquired land and built 32 homes on South Dahlia Lane, in Arapahoe County just southeast of Denver. The cooperative was launched by faculty members at the University of Denver who at the time lived in temporary postwar housing (mainly butler huts) and wanted something better. Johnson and his family moved into their home in February 1951. South Dahlia Lane's 32 homes were designed by architect Eugene Sternberg, whose South Dahlia Lane home was next door to Johnson's. Sternberg's designs were influenced by Frank Lloyd Wright; Wright's Pope-Leighey House in Virginia has distinctive elements that re-appear in the Sternberg designs for South Dahlia Lane.

Johnson in 1954 launched and organized a church-sponsored housing project for the elderly, Senior Homes of Colorado. Built on East Kentucky Circle, Senior Homes of Colorado opened its doors to residents in 1958.

== Political career ==
Johnson served as member of the Colorado House of Representatives from 1955 to 1956. He was an unsuccessful candidate for election to the Eighty-fifth Congress in 1956. He served as assistant to Gov. Steve McNichols of Colorado from 1957 to 1958.

=== Congress ===
Johnson was elected as a Democrat to the Eighty-sixth Congress (January 3, 1959 – January 3, 1961). He served Colorado's Second Congressional District, which at the time comprised all of northeastern Colorado except for the City and County of Denver. Johnson was an unsuccessful candidate for reelection to the Eighty-seventh Congress in 1960.

=== After Congress ===
He was a delegate to the Democratic National Conventions of 1960 and 1968. He served in the U.S. Agency for International Development, 1961 to 1964, and was appointed consultant for International Cooperation Administration from 1964 to 1965.

== Return to academia ==
Johnson was appointed professor, University of Colorado, in 1965, the position he held until his retirement. He was elected to the University of Colorado Board of Regents in 1970, for a six-year term, and re-elected in 1976. He was an unsuccessful candidate for election to the Ninety-third Congress in 1972. He served as member of the board of the Regional Transportation District, Denver, Colorado from 1982 to 1984; he was its vice chairman in 1983, and its chairman in 1984.

Upon retirement, Johnson was professor emeritus at the University of Colorado.

== Death and burial ==
He died on January 6, 2000, in Englewood, Colorado and was buried at Fairmount Cemetery in Denver.

U.S. House of Representatives
Preceded by William S. Hill	Member of the U.S. House of Representatives from Colorado's 2nd congressional district January 3, 1959 – January 3, 1961	Succeeded by Peter Dominick
