= Ed Hawkins =

Ed Hawkins may refer to:

== Persons ==
- Ed Hawkins, a writer of the 1975 film Sasquatch, the Legend of Bigfoot
- Ed Hawkins (climatologist), British climatologist and designer of certain data visualization graphics
- Eddie Hawkins, former American soccer player
- Edwin Hawkins (1943–2018), American gospel musician

== Fictional characters ==
- Ed Hawkins, a character in the television series Awake
- Ed Hawkins, a character in the 1998 film Goldrush: A Real Life Alaskan Adventure
- Ed Hawkins, a character in the 1988 film Out of Time

== Other ==
- Ed Hawkins, a horse that is an ancestor of American saddlebred stallion Rex McDonald

== See also ==
- Edward Hawkins (disambiguation)
