= William S. Hill =

American politician (1886–1972)

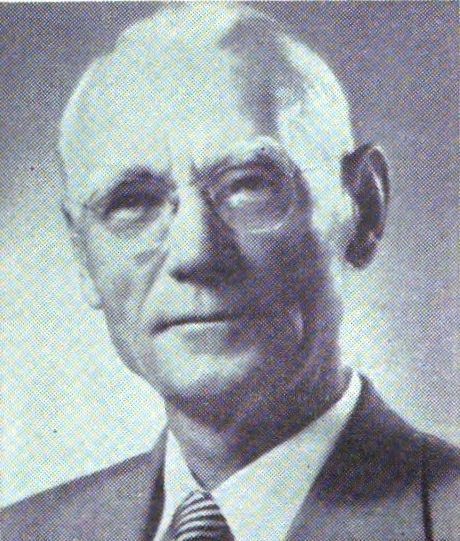

Member of the U.S. House of Representatives from Colorado's 2nd district
- In office January 3, 1941 – January 3, 1959
- Preceded by: Fred N. Cummings
- Succeeded by: Byron L. Johnson

Personal details
- Born: William Silas Hill; January 20, 1886 Kelly, Kansas
- Died: August 28, 1972 (aged 86) Fort Collins, Colorado
- Resting place: Grandview Cemetery, Fort Collins
- Party: Republican
- Spouse: Rachel Trower
- Children: 2
- Education: Colorado State College of Agriculture
- Committees: Small business, agriculture, irrigation and reclamation, Indian affairs and labor.

William Silas Hill (January 20, 1886 – August 28, 1972) was a U.S. representative from Colorado for nine terms from 1941 to 1959. His career was largely focused on agriculture. He studied at the Colorado State College of Agriculture, was a farmer, secretary of the Colorado State Farm Bureau, and while a congressman worked on agricultural issues.

== Early life and education ==
Born in Kelly, Kansas, William Silas Hill attended the public schools, Kansas State Normal at Emporia, Kansas, and Colorado State College of Agriculture at Fort Collins.

== Career ==
He homesteaded near Cheyenne Wells, Colorado from 1907 to 1915. He was superintendent of Cache la Poudre Consolidated School of Larimer County, Colorado from 1919 to 1922. Secretary of the Colorado State Farm Bureau in 1923.

=== Early career ===
He served in the State house of representatives from 1924 to 1926. He engaged in the mercantile business at Fort Collins, Colorado from 1927 to 1953.

=== Congress ===
Hill was elected as a Republican to the 77th Congress and to the eight succeeding Congresses (January 3, 1941 – January 3, 1959). He served as chairman of the Select Committee on Small Business (83rd Congress) and was particularly focus on improving the fate of small metal mines in the western United States. He supported agricultural issues and served on agriculture-related subcommittees, including the end of the quota system on livestock slaughter, studying the Federal crop‐insurance program, and for a prohibition of controls on commodity margins. Hill voted in favor of the Civil Rights Act of 1957. He was not a candidate for renomination in 1958 to the 86th Congress.

=== Later activities ===
He retired in 1958 and operated a farm southwest of Fort Collins until 1969. He served as a delegate to Republican National Convention in 1964.

== Personal life ==
He married Rachel Trower and they had a son, Alden Trower Hill and a daughter, Marjorie Hill Hunter.

=== Death and legacy ===
W.S. Hill died in Fort Collins, Colorado, August 28, 1972. He was interred in Grandview Cemetery, Fort Collins.

His papers were donated to the Special Collections and University Archives of the Wichita State University.

U.S. House of Representatives
| Preceded by Fred N. Cummings | Member of the U.S. House of Representatives from Colorado's 2nd congressional district January 3, 1941 – January 3, 1959 | Succeeded by Byron L. Johnson |
