= Eugene Sternberg =

American architect

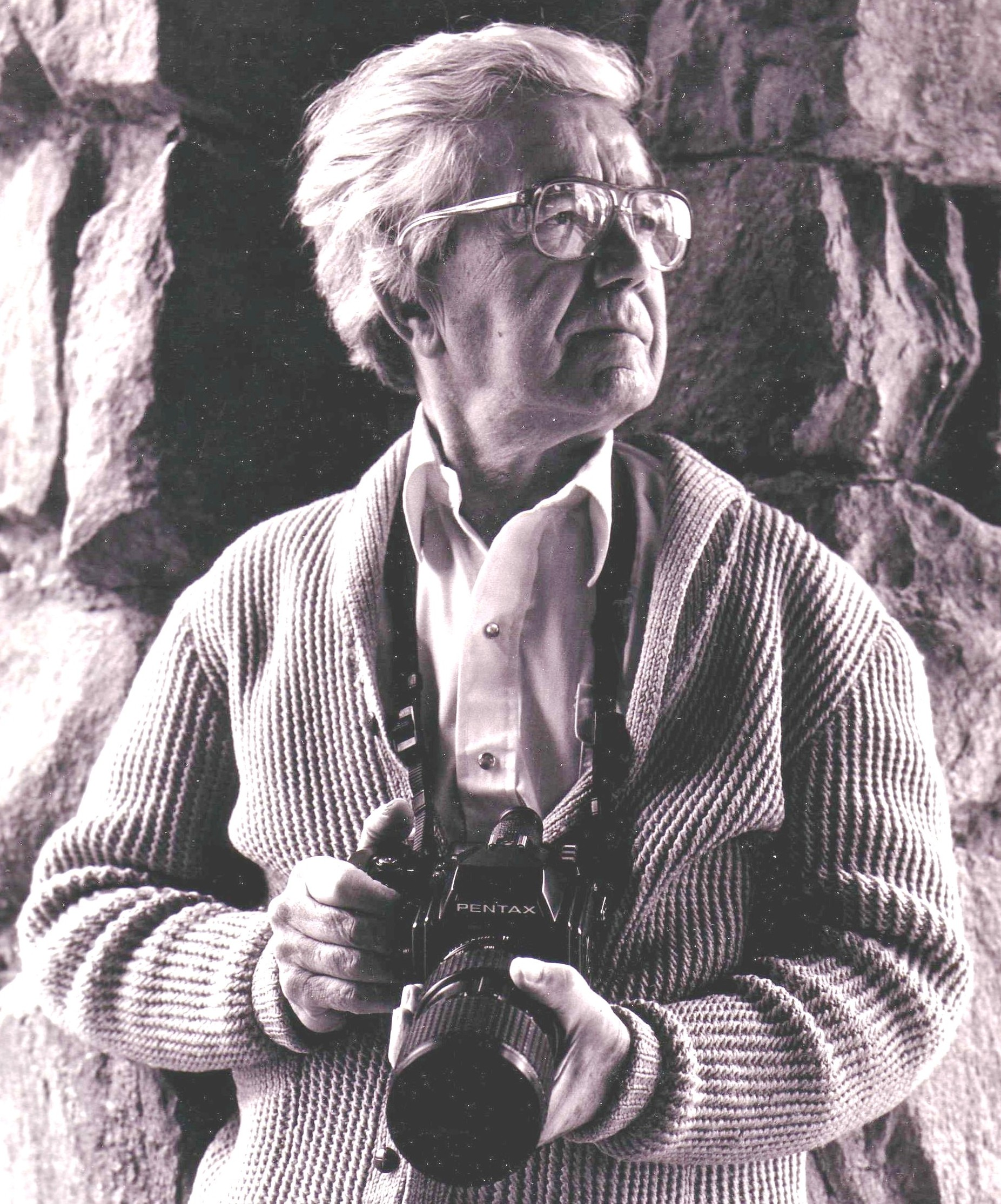
- Eugene Sternberg – ca. 1990
- Born: Eugene Sternberg; January 15, 1915; Pressburg, Austria-Hungary, (now Bratislava, Slovakia)
- Died: June 5, 2005 (aged 90); Evergreen, Colorado, U.S.

Eugene Sternberg (January 15, 1915 – June 5, 2005) was a Hungarian-born American architect known for his passionate commitment and contribution to contemporary/modernist architecture and town planning in Colorado and other Rocky Mountain states between 1950 and 1990. He designed over 400 building projects and subdivisions, many of them iconic examples of Modernist architecture. Since his focus was on improving the quality of life of the general population, the structures he built were beautiful, useful, and cost-effective. Most of his projects were in the category of social architecture: affordable homes, senior housing projects, public housing, hospitals, medical clinics, public schools, community colleges, community centers, churches, buildings for credit unions, labor unions, and headquarters offices for Rural Electric Associations. As a planner Sternberg designed a number of innovative housing subdivisions and master plans for college campuses, governmental complexes, county fairgrounds, and a number of small western cities.

== Early years ==
Sternberg was born during World War I in Pressburg, Austria-Hungary where his family had moved to be with his father while he served in the Austro-Hungarian army. When the war, and the Austro-Hungarian Empire, ended in 1918, the family returned to their home in Munkács, Kingdom of Hungary (now Mukachevo, Ukraine); in 1920 it became part of the newly created country of Czechoslovakia.

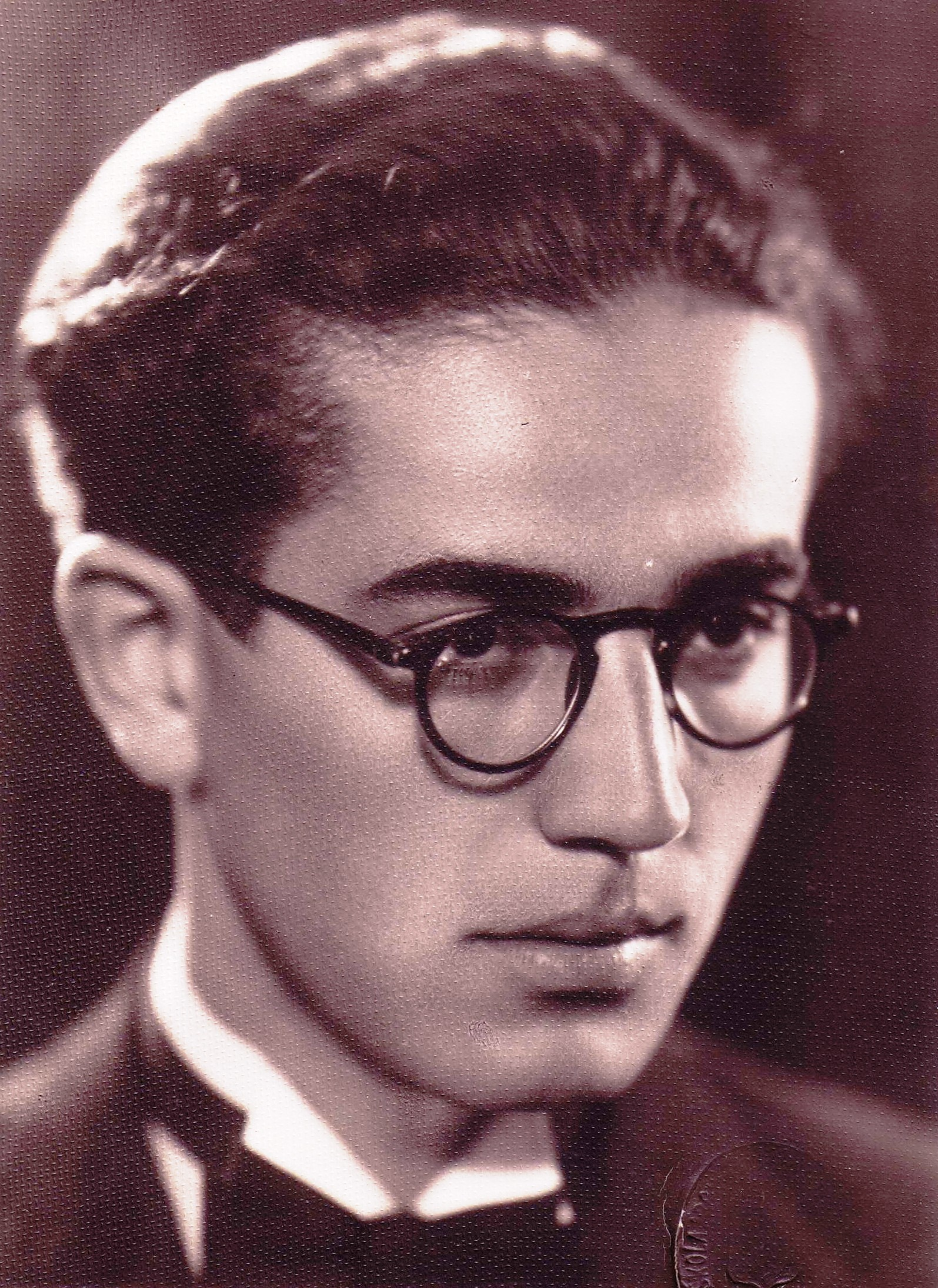
High School Graduation Photo 1935 - Sternberg Family.

During his elementary and high school education. Sternberg's major passion was art. He developed into an accomplished young artist and won a coveted place to study architecture at the Czech Technical University in Prague. In the summers he worked for two architectural firms in Munkács and for a well-known Czech architect, Frantisek Libra, in Prague. In 1938, he earned a first degree in architecture/engineering. Adolf Hitler's Germany occupied Czechoslovakia in March 1939. Because Sternberg was offered a scholarship to the University of London's Bartlett School of Architecture he was fortunate to leave Czechoslovakia in 1939, the only one of his large Jewish family to be able to do so.

After World War II was declared in September 1939, the Bartlett School was evacuated to Cambridge where Sternberg studied from 1939 to 1944, completing his architectural qualifications and a graduate degree in town planning. His mentor in town planning was Sir Patrick Abercrombie who was, at that time, Britain's busiest and most imaginative planner.

After graduation, Sternberg was invited to join Abercrombie's firm in London, where he worked mainly on planning new neighborhoods to replace the housing destroyed by German bombing. Sternberg also taught part-time at Cambridge University, the University of London and the Regent Street Polytechnic. As the war drew to an end, Sternberg and Barbara Edwards, his British fiancée, decided to emigrate to the United States. To accomplish this, they each had to secure a job in the U.S. Sternberg received a three-year contract to teach city planning at Cornell University. Barbara secured a position at the British Information Services in Manhattan. Gene and Barbara were married in Ithaca, New York in the fall of 1946. Sternberg soon became dissatisfied with the general lack of creative activity in Cornell's architectural and planning departments, and was particularly disappointed when he found that full-time faculty members were forbidden to practice. He resigned from the prestigious university after three months and took on the challenges of a newcomer in an unfamiliar country, with no job and few professional contacts. Fortunately, Sternberg's background and qualifications appealed to Carl Feiss, Director of a new School of Architecture and Planning at the University of Denver, where Sternberg became Associate Professor of Design. The Sternbergs, with a six weeks old baby, took their first ever flight in August 1947 to a new home in a city and state of which they had never heard.

== A brand new start ==
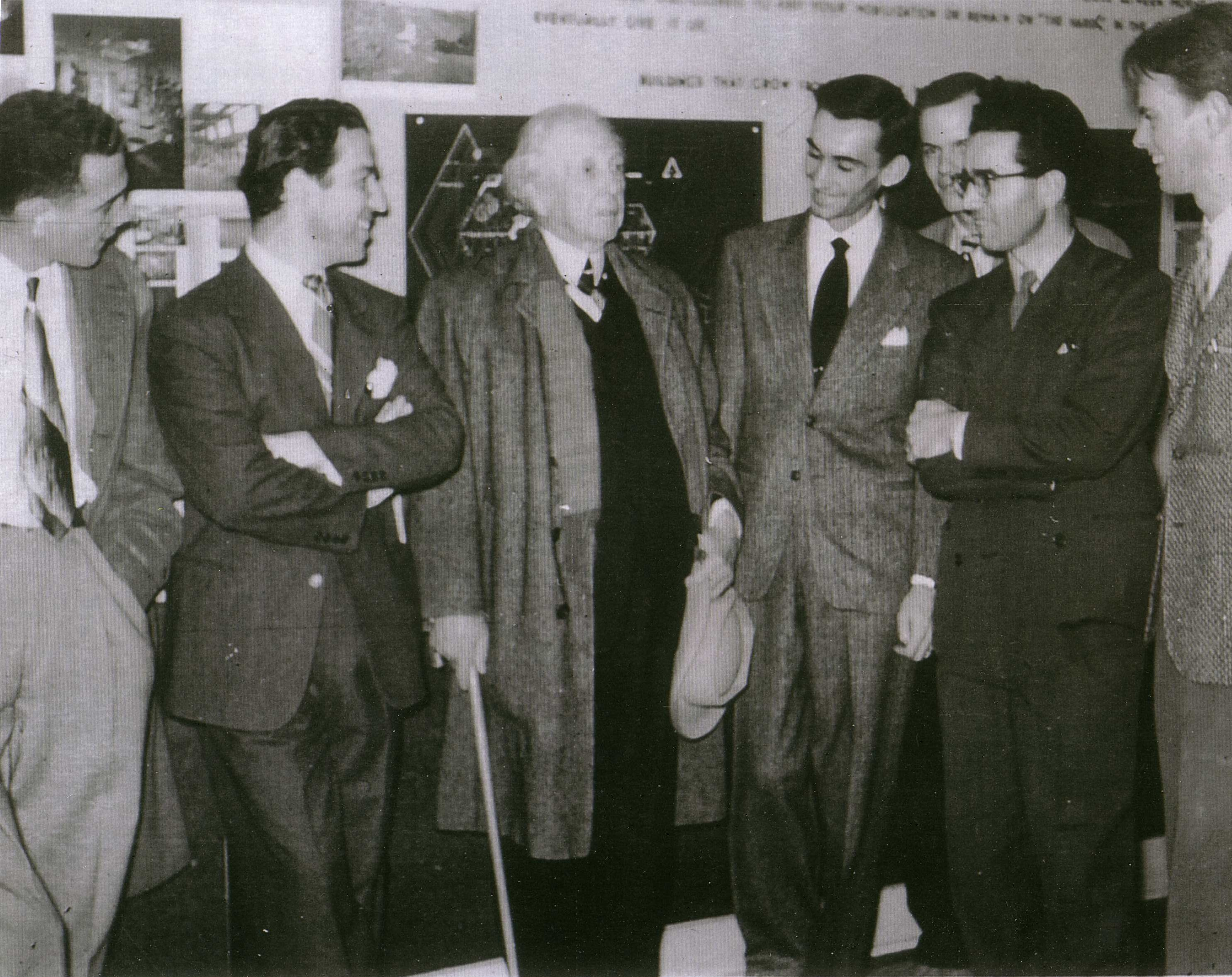
Wright, Eugene Sternberg and DU Staff and Students - Sternberg Family.

The Sternbergs' moved into a small unit of military surplus faculty housing on the University of Denver Campus. The curriculum of the new University of Denver school was unique in combining training in both architecture and city planning. It was also distinguished by the number of practicing architects on its faculty. The school's approach to architecture enticed Frank Lloyd Wright to accept an invitation sent by the students to visit the new Denver School. The School was housed in a remodeled building in downtown Denver. Sternberg was a forceful and demanding teacher and his students, mostly G.I.'s and many already married, worked long hours in the studios. But he was also hard-working and creative himself, and highly valued by most of the students. Thirty years after his first class graduated from the School of Architecture and Planning his students organized a reunion and wrote to him, "Gene, you taught us to dream. If we accomplished nothing it was our fault. If we have achieved anything, then we are grateful to you."

Although he was licensed to practice architecture in Great Britain and in New York State, Sternberg was required to take the Colorado licensing exams. This was not an easy assignment: English was a third language for him and it was many years since he had taken engineering courses. He spent the summer of 1948–9 in intensive study and succeeded in passing the exams in October. Shortly thereafter, he was asked by a Littleton physician, Dr. McKenzie, to design his new medical clinic. The building was economical, simple, functional and attractive. In the following years, Sternberg received many commissions to design medical and dental clinics. Publication in national architectural magazines brought him to the attention of Reinhold, the major architectural book publisher of the time. Reinhold commissioned him, in cooperation with Seattle architect Paul H. Kirk, to write a book on the architecture of doctors' offices and medical clinics.

== Planning and subdivisions ==
=== Mile High Housing Association ===
In 1949, Sternberg embarked on another challenging commission. Denver was growing, little new housing had been built during the war years, and affordable housing available to modestly paid University of Denver faculty members was virtually non-existent. Under the leadership of Economics Professor Byron L. Johnson, the Mile High Housing Association was formed to acquire land and create a community of contemporary, modestly priced homes. Sternberg was appointed as architect for the project. Sternberg and Johnson themselves were members of the Association, which was largely composed of faculty members. In consultation with the membership, Sternberg developed a plan for the 11-acre alfalfa field bought by the Association. It was an opportunity to use much of his British planning background.

His subdivision plan had no through road, just a circular road of minimum width with one entrance and exit, off South Dahlia St., which provided safety for the many children who would live there. A central 2-acre "village green", with a children's playground and an open-air amphitheater served the community's needs. For economy, five plans for homes of different sizes were developed. Each house was individually sited for maximum privacy and good orientation.

=== Arapahoe Acres ===
While taking bids for building the Mile High Housing Project, Sternberg met developer Edward Hawkins who commissioned Sternberg to plan the subdivision layout and design the first homes for Arapahoe Acres, a development he was undertaking in Englewood. It was the first large project of contemporary homes, of many sizes, designs and costs, to be built in Denver. The Revere Copper Company at the time was looking for a high-quality residential development to sponsor in Denver, something it was doing in selected cities throughout the country. They chose Arapahoe Acres. Their sponsorship also involved designating one house in the subdivision as the "Revere Home" in Colorado.

Sternberg’s site plan was "intended to keep the amount of land used by roads to a minimum, to utilize southern exposure for solar heat, and at the same time gain a view of the Rocky Mountains to the west and to group the houses for privacy." To achieve these design objectives Sternberg introduced curved streets, minimal neighborhood access points, while orienting a majority of the houses at an angle to the street. These design elements minimized traffic and service disruptions, provided orientation for greater southern exposure and a corresponding improvement for western vistas of the Rocky Mountains.

Sternberg designed a single floor plan for the nine original model homes. "The construction is brick, insulated, cavity wall to a uniform sill height, and glass or insulated core plywood panels above the sill. Windows are aluminum casement; roofing is tar and gravel; flooring is asphalt tile; fiber insulating tile with an integral finish forms the ceilings. Heat is gas-fired hot air, fed through tile ducts to strip wall registers." Sternberg extended the variations of the basic plan by altering orientation to the street, the house's position on the lot and the details of the entrance and carport. The development was designed to attract buyers of varying income levels.

It was the very success of the debut of Arapahoe Acres that led to a parting of the ways between Sternberg and Hawkins. Sternberg was disturbed by the prevailing view that contemporary design was the province of the wealthy elite. He was intensely interested in and committed to, proving that good design could be as economical as traditional home building. The two men had agreed on the price for which the model home would be sold. But when Hawkins received an offer for considerably more – he accepted it! Sternberg felt betrayed and severed his connection with the project. Hawkins, a talented designer himself, completed the project using the design services of Joseph Dion, one of Sternberg's most capable students.

Arapahoe Acres has retained its design integrity to this day. It has been well cared for and has benefited particularly from the persistent advocacy of one resident, Diane Wray. "On November 3, 1998, Arapahoe Acres became the first, and remains today the only, post-World War II residential subdivision listed on the National Register of Historic Places as a National Register Historic District."

Sternberg's success with the Mile High Housing Association and Arapahoe Acres paved the way for other opportunities to design other subdivisions in the Denver area Mountain Rangeview, 1954 and Orchard Hills, 1961, and in other cities, including one as far away as Harlingen, Texas.

== Building the practice ==
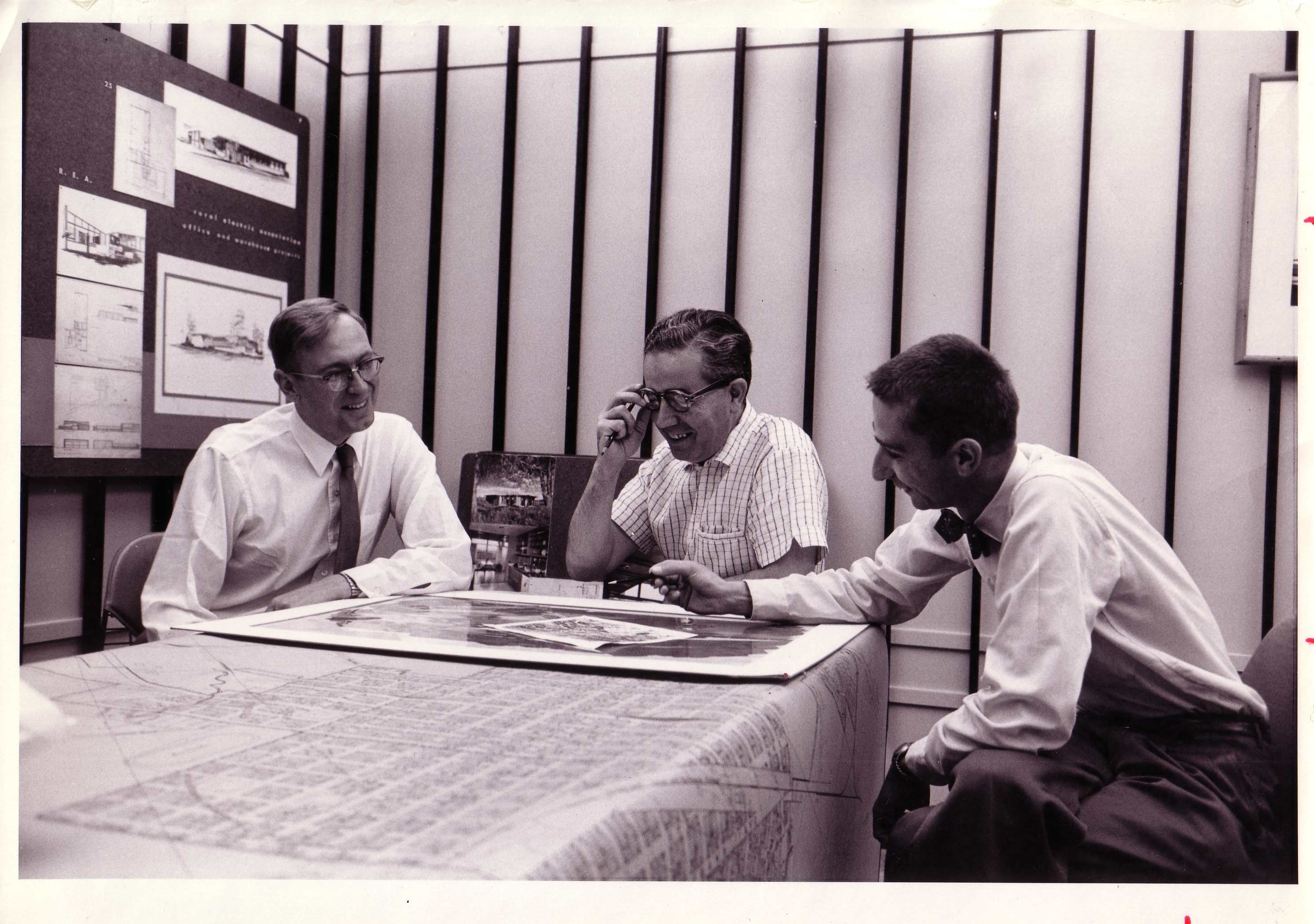
EDS, John Schaffer and Helmut Young - 1954

In 1952 University of Denver, chronically short of money, decided that for financial reasons it must close the School of Architecture and Planning - despite its fine national reputation and demonstrated ability to attract new students. Sternberg was deeply disappointed by the decision but it came at an opportune time for him personally. His practice was growing. He built a first class team of associates, including John Schaffer, Helmut Young and J. D. Willis. Sternberg also needed to assure an adequate flow of work. He decided that architectural commissions in the major cities were largely given to long-established firms with business or "society" connections. He realized that his opportunities to secure commissions lay in the small towns and rural communities of Colorado, Nebraska and Wyoming.

He began to travel extensively, speaking to community groups, meeting leaders, becoming familiar with local problems and aspirations. He genuinely liked and admired these independent Westerners. They in turn seemed to enjoy his dedication, his off-beat thinking and his passion for designing useful, economical and attractive buildings to meet their needs. But still, as he would write later, "few people came knocking at our door asking us to design their new buildings. I had to know when jobs were coming up and who were the important people to contact to be considered for them."

From 1949 to 1977 – the firm of Eugene D Sternberg and Associates designed approximately 400 projects. His clients came from small towns and rural communities in Colorado, Nebraska and Wyoming as well as the greater Denver area. The firm designed schools, community colleges, hospitals and nursing homes, clinics, offices for Rural Electrification Associations, County Courthouse additions, labor union offices and churches.

== Housing ==
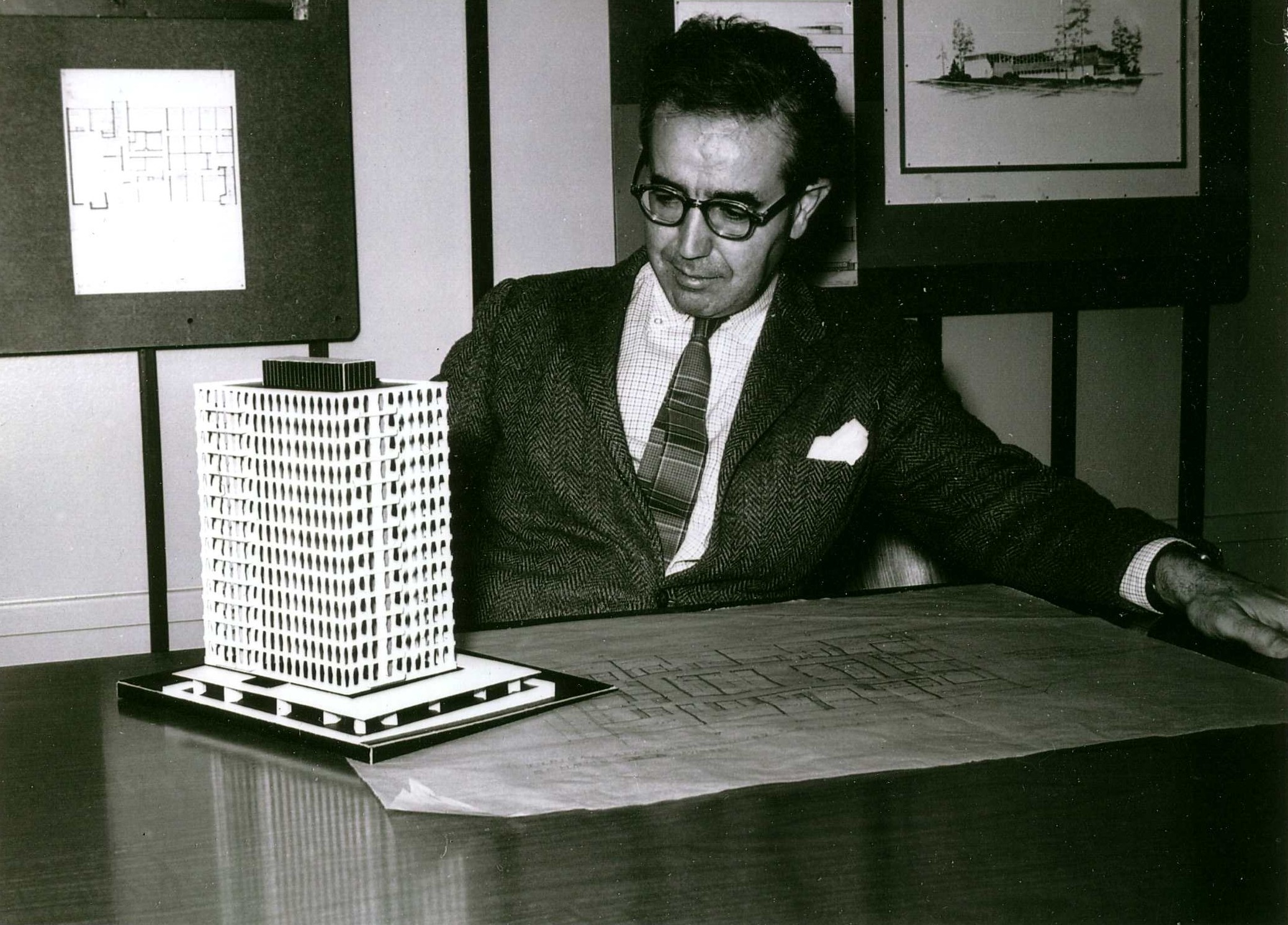
Sternberg with DESCI model.

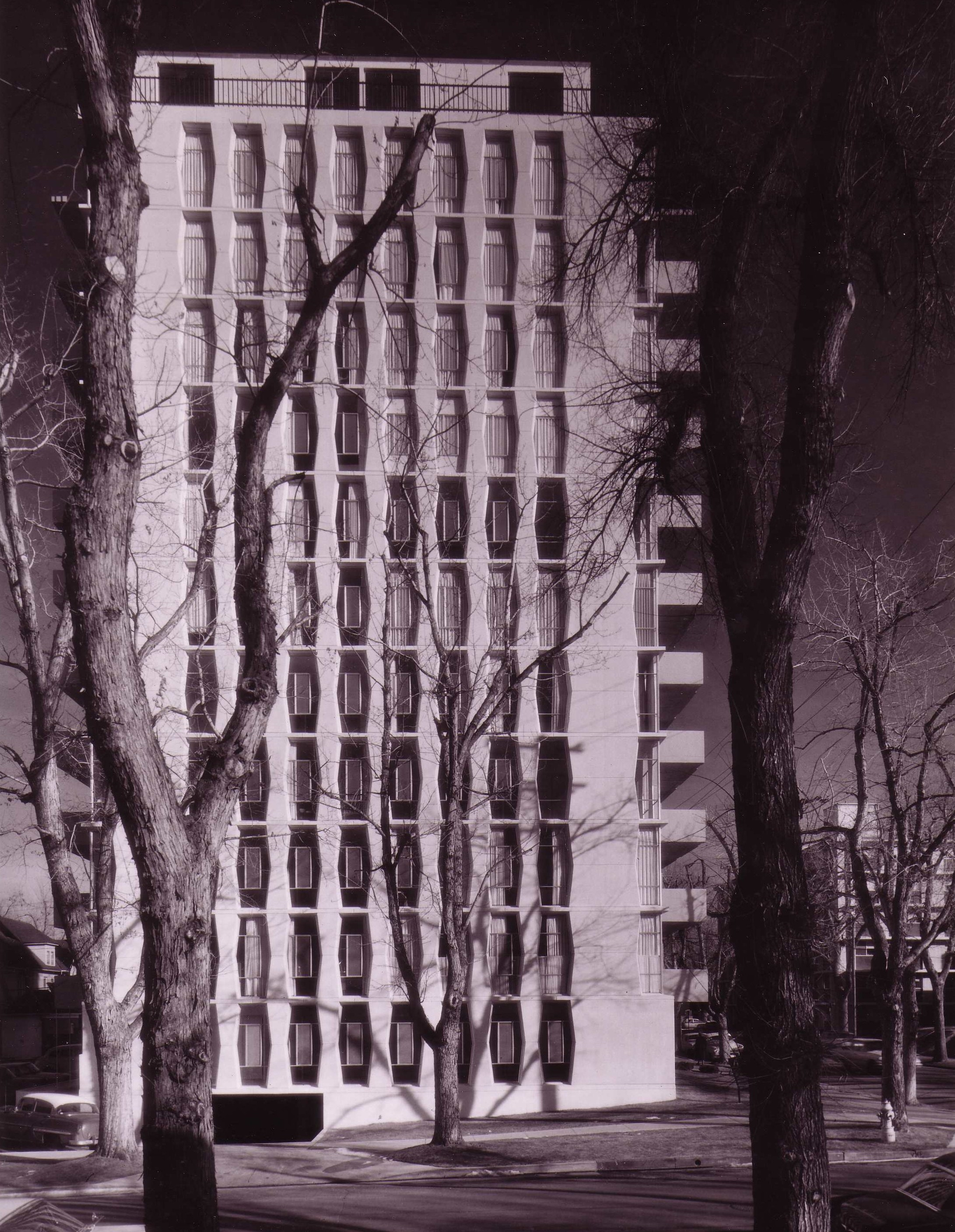
DESCI Building

In 1962 Sternberg participated in a competition for the design of Avondale, a large urban renewal project in Denver. His design was the first choice of the Denver Planning Department staff, but was not the one selected by the Planning Commission.

Very little affordable, attractive housing for the elderly was available in Denver and it gave Sternberg great satisfaction to be involved in a number of senior housing projects. East Kentucky Homes, built in 1959, offered a variety of accommodations from studios to 2-bedroom units, and a center with needed facilities for meal service, medical care and community gatherings. It was sponsored by a group of Protestant churches. The firm also designed in 1964 a high rise development on E. 13th Ave. and High St. for DESCI (Denver Educational Senior Citizens, Inc.), an organization of retired Denver public school teachers. The 1962 Geneva Village was a project in Littleton for a national organization of retired head waiters. A high rise senior housing building (1969) for the African American community was part of a planned community development sponsored by Zion Baptist Church.

In 1950, Sternberg became involved for the first time in the design of public housing in Denver. He was consultant architect to Earl Morris, a long-established Denver architect, on the site plan and building design for Sun Valley Homes, a 200-unit project. Sternberg had been an outspoken critic of the Denver Public Housing Authority's projects. He fought strenuously against the rigid and demeaning limitations imposed at the time by the Housing Authority to appease the political opposition of private home builders. Public housing projects had to be built on sites no commercial homebuilder would consider for development. These sites were isolated from other housing, and the buildings had to be designed so as to look worse than the poorest private housing. In spite of these obstacles, Morris and Sternberg did achieve some limited improvements. They introduced duplexes, in contrast to the customary high-rise buildings or long barracks-like row houses that characterized most public housing of the day. The subdivision plan eliminated the conventional grid street pattern, resulting in greater intimacy and safety from traffic for the residents.

In 1954 Eugene D. Sternberg and Associates were commissioned to design Sun Valley Homes Annex, a 220-unit addition to the original Public Housing Project. He regarded this as a development that fell far short of his high aspirations for successful public housing. He had to abide by the same mean-spirited limitations as in the earlier project. Homes in the Sun Valley projects were isolated and had no easy access to public transportation, shopping or community facilities. Many years later, Sternberg felt some vindication when the Denver Housing Authority decided that it had erred in not providing any community facilities for its housing projects. In 1965 he was commissioned to design five community centers - Auraria, Rude Park, Stapleton, Curtis Park, J. Q. Newton - to rectify the error and improve the residents' quality of life. The research for this commission led to the publication of Sternberg's second architectural book, Community Centers and Student Unions, which he wrote in cooperation with his wife Barbara Sternberg.

== Medical buildings: clinics, nursing homes, hospitals ==
As was mentioned earlier, some of the earliest architectural commissions received by the Sternberg firm were for the design of medical clinics. Over the years, commissions continued to come to the firm for medical and dental clinics both in the Denver area and for other communities including: Thornton, Pueblo, Delta, Greeley.

In 1957, Sternberg was honored to receive an important commission to design the new headquarters building for the Colorado State Department of Public Health. He also designed a large addition, combining office and clinic facilities, to the Tri-County Health Department Building in Englewood, Colorado.

Sternberg also took a great interest in hospital design, believing that the character of the buildings themselves should contribute to the healing process. His earliest hospital work was for National Jewish Hospital, at first in cooperation with Denver architect Earl Morris and later on his own. He remodeled the hospital's auditorium in 1955, designed the Friedenheit building in 1956, a new research facility in 1958, and extensively remodeled the B'nai B'rith Building in 1960. His last project for the hospital, completed in 1977, involved a major innovation, combining patient treatment with research facilities in a handsome 11-story red brick masonry building.

In 1957, the Sternberg firm undertook a major addition and remodeling project for the Longmont Hospital. In 1959, a similar commission came from Craig Hospital. 1968 brought the challenging task of remodeling and enlarging the old railroad hospital in Salida.

The only medical project about which Sternberg felt great disappointment was the Wardenberg Student Health Center in Boulder. He had long railed publicly against the phony Romanesque façade architecture of the University of Colorado campus in Boulder. What can professors of architecture in Boulder do, he would ask, other than take their students for a tour of the campus and show them what not to do? A long-time champion of Sternberg's talents, Vance Austin, was elected in 1956 to the C.U. Board of Regents. Austin vowed that during his term of office, he would introduce some contemporary architecture onto the campus. He succeeded, against considerable opposition, in having the Wardenberg project awarded to Sternberg's firm, but then unexpectedly left the scene when he was appointed to head the Credit Union National Association in Wisconsin.

Sternberg was left with no political support in his fight against the traditionalist architectural dictates of the Head of the Buildings and Grounds Department. A direct appeal to C. U. President Quigg Newton, beset at the time with multiple institutional problems, failed. In the end, Sternberg had to choose between resigning the commission, which he saw as letting Vance down, and designing the health facility behind the Romanesque façade provided by a Philadelphia firm. Reluctantly he chose the latter, and rarely mentioned that he had anything to do with the project. He was quoted as saying it was his one act of architectural prostitution. Many years later, he was surprised and somewhat comforted when his neurologist son reported that he enjoyed working and seeing patients in the building.

Sternberg's last, and most significant, hospital building was a new Denver General Hospital, for which the architect was selected though a competition conducted by the American Institute of Architects. The entry from Sternberg and Associates was selected out of some 90 applications. The contract was awarded in 1965. During the final design and construction phase, many unexpected challenges arose and it was indeed a signal accomplishment when the project was completed on time in 1967, and under budget.

One type of building project that appealed to Eugene Sternberg was that of nursing homes. Many of these facilities had an unenviable reputation as inhospitable warehouses where chronically sick patients, especially the elderly, passed their last years unhappily. The challenge in designing nursing homes for Sternberg combined his concern for decent housing conditions for the elderly with his deep conviction that the design of the physical environment should contribute to the quality of life of residents and to their healing. His firm undertook to design appropriate facilities for three very different settings.

In 1955, a new Colorado State project, serving those elderly who had some degree of need for medical assistance, was announced. Variously named the Trinidad State Homes for the Aged and the Trinidad State Nursing Home, it was planned to care for 159 "aged persons." The concept behind the project was that of people living in a community designed to encourage mental and physical activity and social interaction, and to provide health care - including an infirmary wing - as needed. From a central core, housing kitchen, dining area, lobby and administrative offices, a series of wings radiate outward assuring each single or double room of some sunshine each day as well as a view of surrounding mountains. For some considerations important to the State Government officials, the architectural contract for this project was awarded to the Denver firm of T, H. Buell and Company, with Eugene D. Sternberg as consultant architect. But the Sternberg firm was the major designer of the project.

In 1962, the Sternberg firm completed a new nursing home addition to Mennonite Hospital in La Junta, a town in southern Colorado. The project involved working with the local Mennonite community to expand the hospital’s facilities and provide additional space for nursing home care

The Stovall Care Center, completed in 1977, was the nursing home component of an ambitious planned community development project sponsored by Zion Baptist Church, the oldest black church in Denver. The 30-bed facility, according to its sponsors, has "a single level floor plan, emphasizing safety and efficiency, appealing home-like environment with comfortable lounge areas and a creatively designed dining area." Earlier phases of the development were a community center and a 100-unit high rise senior housing building. At the dedication of the Stovall Center, Gene Sternberg was honored for "his incomparable skill as an architect, coupled with his unfathomable humaneness."

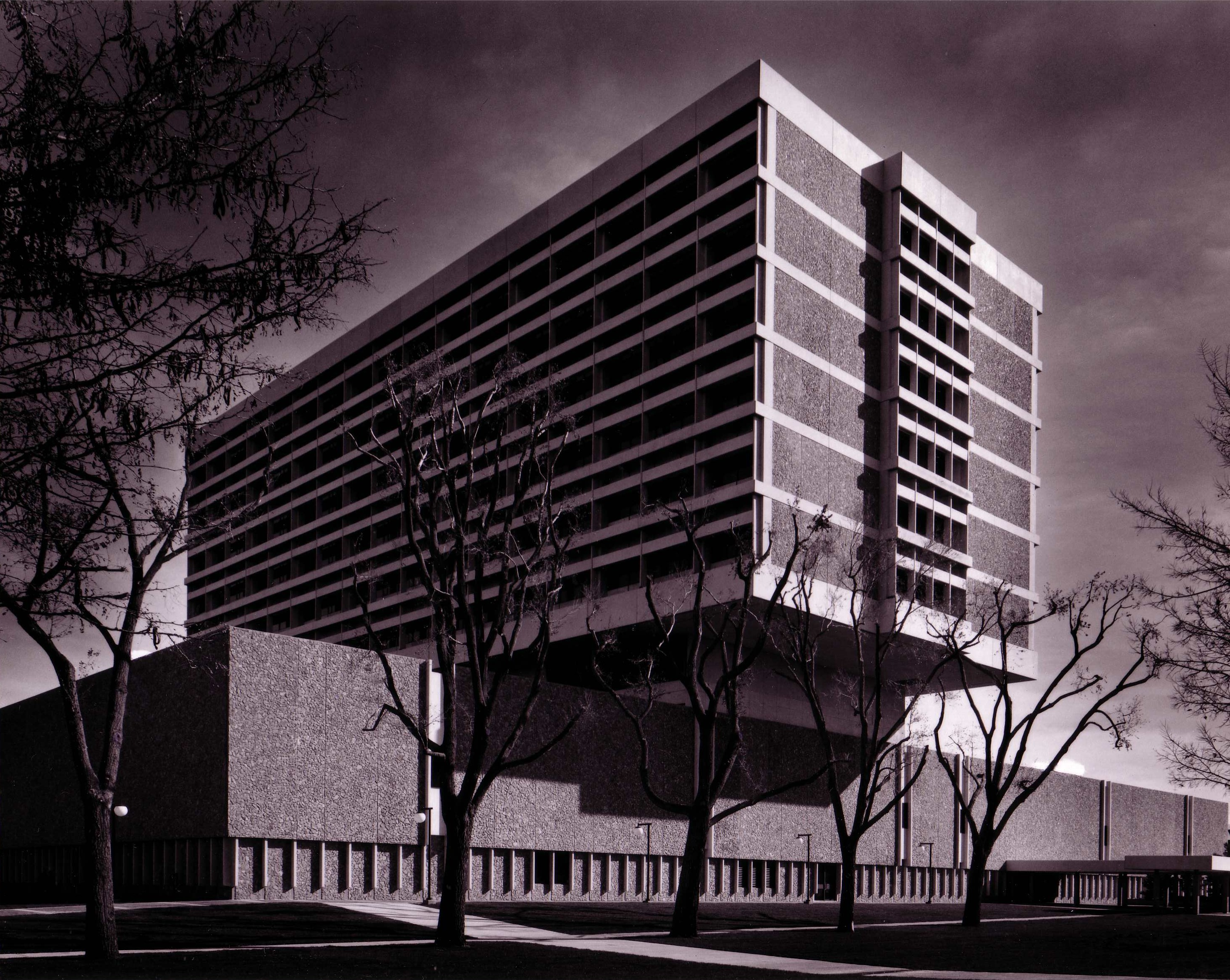
Denver General Hospital - Sternberg Family Collection.

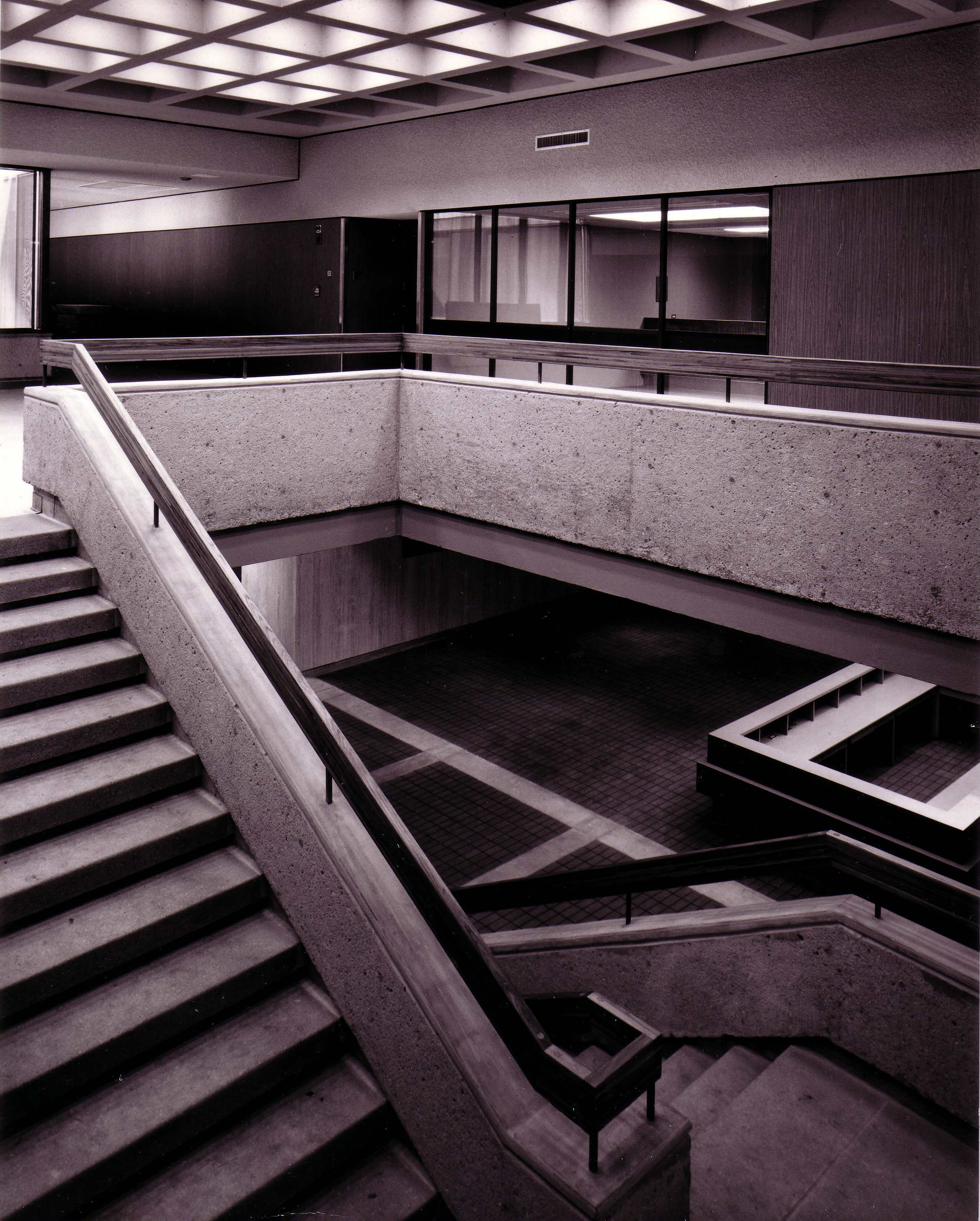
Denver General Hospital stairwell - Sternberg Family Collection.

== Buildings for education and cultural enrichment ==
The design of public schools, those institutions which educate and deeply influence our next generation of young men and women, was a matter of lively interest and constant research for architect Sternberg. Throughout the years of his practice, starting with a small experimental primary school in Englewood in 1952, there were always one or more schools in the design process or under construction. Almost 40 in all, these included many sizes of elementary, junior high and high schools, located in the Denver metro area (Englewood, Littleton, Sheridan, Jefferson County, Cherry Creek District) and in small towns throughout Colorado (Carbondale, Sterling, Craig, Steamboat Springs, Nucla), Nebraska (Sidney, Kimball, Crawford) and Wyoming (Lance Creek, Lusk). Almost everywhere, in fact, except for the School District of the City and County of Denver. Sternberg was a fierce critic of the limitations placed on architects by Denver in the years he was designing schools. He maintained that these prescriptions resulted in schools designed not for students, nor for teachers, but for janitors. It amused him that the only way a school of his design got into Denver was when the small College View School District, where he had done a large school addition, was annexed into the city.

In 1961, Sternberg decided to move his office to Littleton where he was welcomed by Houston Waring, the influential editor of the local newspaper, The Littleton Independent. His firm designed many buildings in Littleton, including two of the most important educational projects of Sternberg's career, Arapahoe Community College and Heritage High School (Littleton, Colorado).

Arapahoe Community College was a long time in the making, and Sternberg was involved from the start in its creative evolution. The State of Colorado' s preference was for buying virgin land on the outskirts of the town and developing a campus of one or two-story scattered buildings, but after considering 20 different sites, Sternberg's argument that it should be located in the heart of the Littleton community won out. A 51-acre site was developed as an urban renewal project. All the college's needs were met in one megastructure. This design approach preserved the old trees on the site, provided adequate parking, and, Sternberg believed, would promote more interaction between students and faculty of different disciplines. The building is of concrete in what is today described as the modernist style. As a community college, the facility has been highly successful. Its design has been the subject of much debate, with some students enjoying it and others characterizing it unfavorably as "Sternberg's Slab." In recent years, a large, glass-filled entrance structure has been added with the intention of softening the original, spare design.

Heritage High School, serving 2,000 students, was considered by Sternberg to be his best school design. It had a magnificent well equipped theater, a complete arts and crafts department, a spacious music department, a first-class library on two levels, and a number of informal meeting areas or "commons" throughout the building. The school was built on three levels, making use of the site's 35-foot slope. All floors were accessible from the outside by the handicapped. The firm received an award for designing the first high school totally accessible to the handicapped. Going against the prevailing standard that a school of this size needed 50 acres of land, Sternberg persuaded the School Board that he could accommodate all the school's outdoor needs on one-half of this acreage. He persuaded them to spend the savings on landscaping the entire site, with grass sod, sprinkler systems and mature trees planted everywhere. The school was a marked contrast to the typical high schools of the time, which had a small green area in front and the rest of the land covered in gravel.

Designing schools and colleges gave the Sternberg firm considerable experience in the planning of efficient, economical, user-friendly libraries. This background proved valuable when they were commissioned to design a new public library for Aurora and the Bemis public library in Littleton .

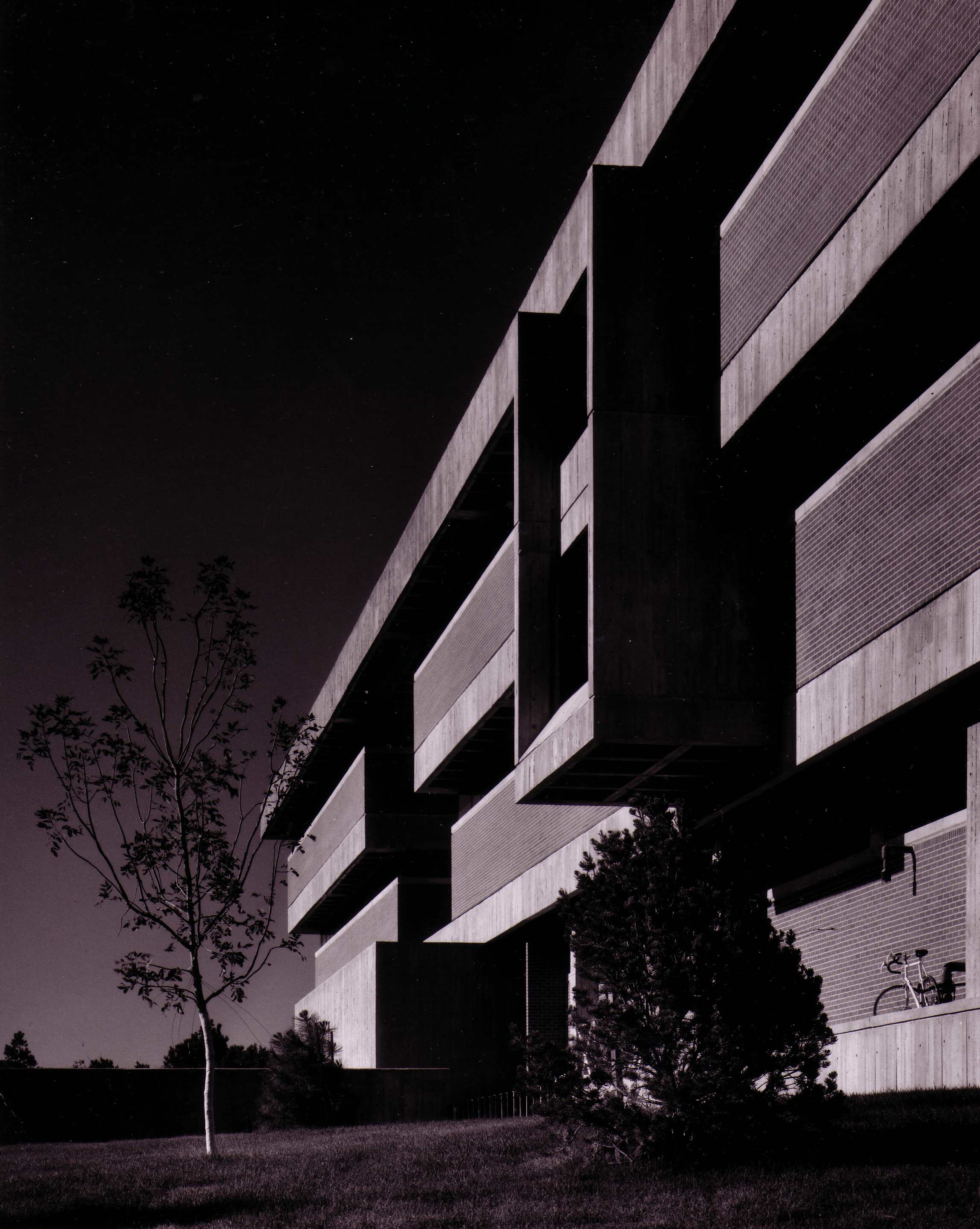
Heritage High School - Sternberg Family Collection.

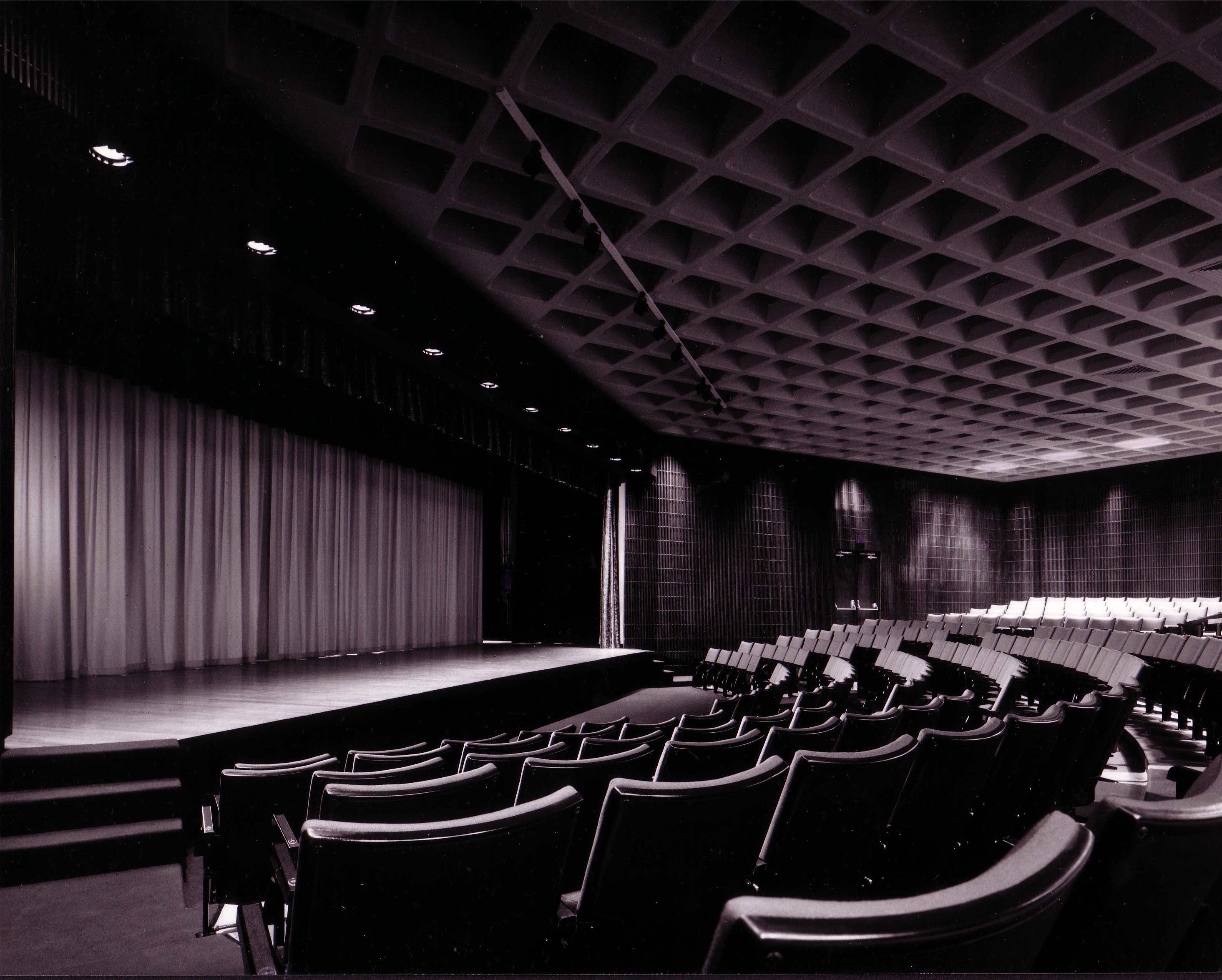
Heritage High School Theatre - Sternberg Family Collection.

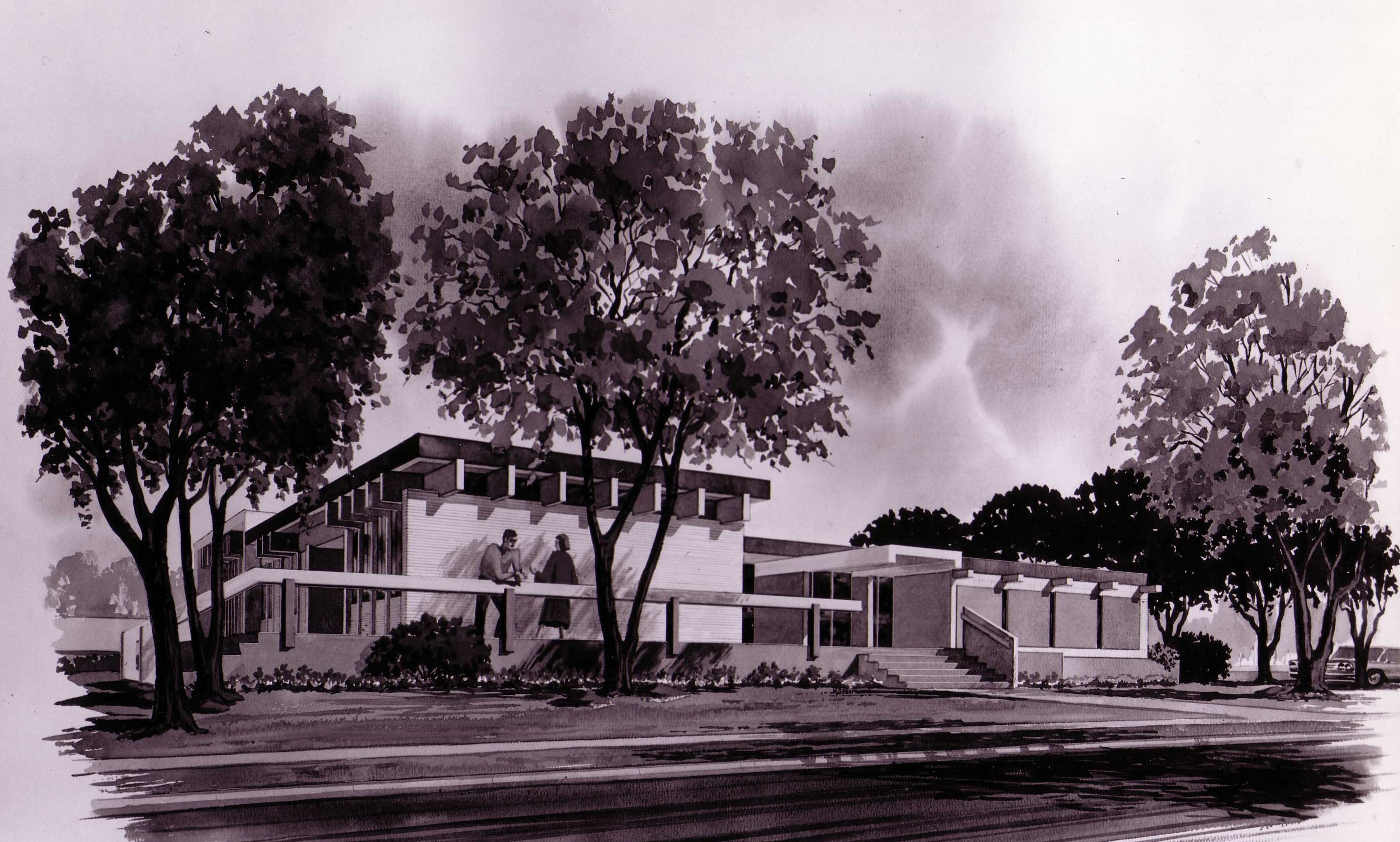
Bemis Library - Sternberg Family Collection.

== Buildings for credit unions and rural electric associations ==
One category of buildings which involved Sternberg in many new relationships and communities was that of credit unions, which some have called "peoples' banks." His first design in this category was for Malmstrom Air Force Base in Great Falls, Montana. The rest of the buildings were in Canada – Richmond, Trail, Nanaimo, Port Alberni, Vancouver - where credit unions are far more prevalent than in the U.S. Sternberg's last credit union project in Canada was an innovative master plan for False Creek, a large, neglected waterfront site in Vancouver that had been acquired by the British Columbia Central Credit Union. The plan provided for a handsome new headquarters building for B. C. Central on which Sternberg was the consultant architect. That building was completed in 1974.

Rural Electric Associations (REA's) were another type of organization that appealed to Sternberg because of the direct and valuable service they provided to small towns and rural areas, and the active participation of users.. These organizations grew out of the New Deal decision to stimulate the provision of electricity to rural areas. The Rural Electrification Administration, created in 1935, made long-term loans to state and local governments. farmers' cooperatives, and non-profit organizations. The REA's for which the Sternberg architectural firm designed headquarters buildings were cooperatives and took him to Nucla, Delta, Durango, Montrose, and Craig. He also did a remodeling and addition project for the Inter-Mountain REA headquartered in Littleton and for an Association serving the rural area around Grant, Nebraska.

== Religious projects ==
Though he did not actively pursue opportunities to design religious buildings, a few commissions in this area were offered to Sternberg and he embraced them enthusiastically. Over the years he designed a Baptist church and a Synagogue in Denver, a Congregational Church campus in Littleton, an Episcopalian Church in Fort Morgan and a Methodist church in Steamboat Springs. For the Zion Baptist Church, the oldest black church in Denver, founded in 1867, he developed a master plan for a community enrichment project integrating a community center, high-rise senior housing building, nursing home, art center and church sanctuary with religious classrooms.

== A variety of other projects and buildings ==
A cursory survey of the work of architect Sternberg during his years of intensive practice shows that he did some 45-50 projects that did not fit into any of the categories covered so far. He designed half a dozen office buildings, including one for the Hirschfield Press, another jointly for the Mayo accounting firm and businessman and philanthropist Gerald Schlessman, where Sternberg had his own office for a time, and two for the Prudential Insurance Company, one of which is today an attractive restaurant in the Cherry Creek area. Perhaps the most successful from a design point of view were the Law Offices of Martin Miller on Littleton Boulevard.

There was also a delightful building for the influential newspaper, Cervi's Journal (now the Denver Business Journal), located on Delaware Street near the Denver City and County Building. Sternberg was quite nervous when Cervi, a liberal, outspoken, temperamental newspaperman first approached him. "Why me?" he asked. "You know so many architects in Denver. I don't want to be crucified in your paper if I make a mistake – and I do make mistakes!" Cervi reassured him, "Gene, you and I will get along just fine. I want you to be my architect." The collaboration worked well and Cervi was delighted with his new facility. Unfortunately, after Cervi died and the paper was taken over by his daughter, the City of Denver decided it needed the land. The Cervi office was among the buildings razed to make room for Denver's new police building.

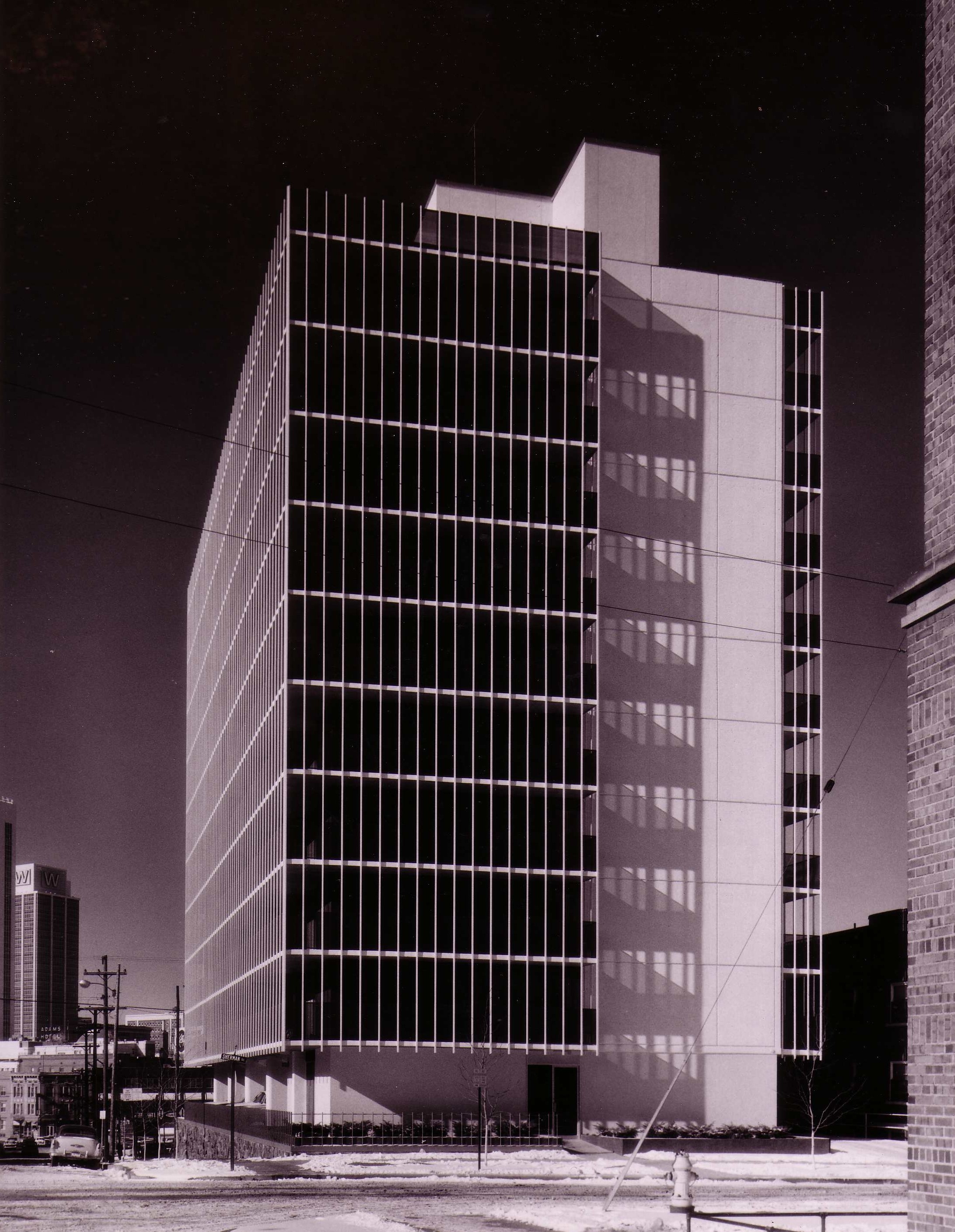
Hillcrest Apartments, Denver

For Gerald Schlessman, Sternberg designed Hillcrest Apartments, a commercial high-rise apartment building in central Denver. He was sincerely distressed when he heard, about a year after completion of the project, that Schlessman was losing money on it and had put it up for sale. He went to talk with his client and expressed his concern. "Don't give it a thought, Gene," said Schlessman, "I can always use a loss." That reasoning went beyond Sternberg's personal financial experience. At the other end of the housing spectrum was a complex of small, economical apartment units Sternberg designed for a beautiful site overlooking the town of Steamboat Springs. Currently, the owners of the apartments are seeking to have the project designated as having historic significance. The site is too desirable and developers have in mind the razing of the present inexpensive homes to make way for a denser development.

Eugene D. Sternberg and Associates had considerable experience working on governmental projects, federal, state, county and municipal. Designing a new regional headquarters building in Denver for the federal Food and Drug Administration was, for Sternberg, like finding himself in the middle of a satirical farce about government bureaucracy. He designed the building for the chosen site, fighting battles all the way against outdated rules and regulations. Suddenly, a major defect in the site title was discovered, and a new site was purchased. The building design was adapted to the new site and final plans submitted to Washington. Nothing was heard for an extended period of time, and finally the word came down that money for the project had run out and it was being abandoned. His other federal commission went much more smoothly. This was a straightforward, attractive and functional post office for Glenwood Springs in 1964.

The experience of working for the State of Colorado was generally satisfying. In addition to the projects already mentioned - the State Public Health building in Denver and the Trinidad Old Age Homes and Nursing Home - Sternberg in 1957 remodeled several offices in the State Capitol Building, including the Governor's quarters, and designed extensive new facilities for the State Home and Training School in Grand Junction (1958).

Sternberg celebrated the opportunities open to an architect in general practice to learn about the variety of human activities and occupations. Designing a building for a new radio station was intriguing, as was the experience of planning a new fire station for Aurora. Remodeling the Arapahoe County Jail illuminated some of the darker sides of the human experience, while accommodating the myriad functions to be served by a new Delta County Courthouse was a rewarding planning assignment. There was the totally unexpected opportunity to develop a master plan for a new seaside resort in Newport, Rhode Island, on the site of an old mansion. Sternberg believed in the educational value of participating in architectural and planning competitions: the firm had an entry in the national competition for a memorial to President Franklin D. Roosevelt, and submitted entries in international competitions for the design of new towns in Turkey, Slovakia and the Czech Republic. He also designed an inexpensive building for the Chamber of Commerce (1960) in the town of Steamboat Springs, which was listed on the National Register of Historic Places in 2010.

== Transitioning from architectural practice ==
As their Sternberg household dwindled down from eight members to three, Gene began the transition from his professional practice to a new role and a new "hometown." Since 1949, the Sternbergs had enjoyed spending time in summer in a cabin they built in Evergreen, 30 miles into the foothills west of Denver. By 1970, Evergreen was in the process of transformation from a small mountain summer resort to a year-round community within commuting distance of Denver. The Sternbergs sold the cherished home that Eugene had designed for the family in Orchard Hills, and moved into an old log house on the banks of Evergreen's Upper Bear Creek, Colorado with their youngest daughter.

Gene Sternberg gradually transitioned into a life of very active volunteering. He served for many years on the Jefferson County Planning Commission and was a leading member of the Evergreen Design Task Force, which worked to improve the built environment in the community. He initiated Evergreen's efforts to enliven its landscape with a variety of strategically placed outdoor sculpture. A small group, including both Gene and Barbara Sternberg, worked to raise funds to place a bronze sculpture by Evergreen artist Tom Ware outside the new Evergreen Library in 1993. The group decided to form an ongoing non-profit organization, Art for the Mountain Community, which has flourished.

In 1987 Gene and Barbara published a detailed, illustrated history of Evergreen. Updated editions were published in 1993 and 2004 with all proceeds donated to the Evergreen Kiwanis Foundation, which makes useful annual grants to non-profit organizations in the community.

Gene Sternberg died in Evergreen on June 5, 2005, at the age of ninety.

== Sternberg's architectural style ==
When Sternberg started his practice in Colorado, he was concerned to develop a regional version of what was then known as contemporary architecture, and is today described as modernist. He designed buildings that were simple, functional, without Victorian architecture "gingerbread" (unnecessary decoration), and using materials historically familiar. For Colorado, this meant brick - especially red brick - sandstone, and wood. Some have described this period of Sternberg's architecture as "Usonian", having characteristics of Frank Lloyd Wright's domestic architecture. Though Sternberg held many architectural goals in common with Wright, he felt his own design style originated more from his experience in Britain, and his interest in creating clean, functional and economical buildings, than from any other influences. For a few of his late, large-scale projects like Arapahoe Community College and Heritage High School (Littleton, Colorado), he enthusiastically adopted a modified International Style (also at the time called "Brutalist") using concrete as the major building material, believing that this best suited the functions of these particular buildings. However one of his last buildings, the high-rise patient care and research building for National Jewish Hospital, has a strikingly simple, warm red brick exterior.

== Licenses, professional memberships, appointments, and other honors ==
- Eugene Sternberg became a licensed architect in the United Kingdom in 1944, and eligible for membership in the Royal Institute of British Architects. In 1947, he became a member of the American Institute of Architects.
- In the United States, Sternberg was a licensed architect in Colorado (1949), Wyoming (1951), Nebraska (1952), and Rhode Island (1964), and qualified for national licensing with the National Council of Architectural Registration Boards (1963).
- He was a certified Town Planner in the United Kingdom (1946) and an Associate Member of the American Institute of Planners (1947).
- In 1955. Sternberg was appointed by Governor Ed Johnson as a member of the Colorado State Board of Examiners for Architects and was re-appointed to this position by Governor Steven McNichols in 1957.
- In 1964 Sternberg was appointed by Marie McGuire, Public Housing Authority Commissioner, as one of 19 consultant architects invited to assist in the efforts of the PHA to upgrade the design of low-cost and public housing.
- Sternberg was appointed by Governor Richard D. Lamm in 1985 as a member of the Colorado State Health Facilities Review Council.
- A plaque was presented to Sternberg in 1884 expressing the appreciation of the Evergreen Recreation Board, Staff, and Community for his volunteer contribution to Designing and Remodeling the Addition to the Evergreen Metro Recreation Park District Center
- At graduation ceremonies of the University of Colorado, Denver, on May 17, 1986, Sternberg was presented with the Mack Easton Distinguished Service Award for his contributions to the School of Architecture and its programs.
- In 1987 the Evergreen Chapter of the Daughters of the American Revolution honored Eugene and Barbara Sternberg for their contribution to local historical knowledge through the publication of their book, Evergreen: Our Mountain Community.
- In March 1987, the Jefferson County Planning Commission Certificate of Appreciation to Sternberg for his service, and in April of the same year, the Jefferson County Board of County Commissioners presented him with a Certificate of Merit in appreciation for his volunteer services.
- Eugene and Barbara Sternberg received an Award from the Jefferson County Public Library for "Generous Contributions to the Evergreen Library and Community."
- In 1990, the Denver Public Library Friends Foundation had a ceremony honoring a number of Colorado authors in what they called a First Edition of Book Plates. Eugene and Barbara Sternberg were recognized for their book, Evergreen, Our Mountain Community.
- There were other Evergreen honors. In 1992, Eugene Sternberg was honored as " Evergreen Person of the Year." For the years 1992–3, the Evergreen Kiwanis presented Sternberg with an Appreciation Award for his services to the club and to the community. In 2000, the Evergreen Area Arts Council honored Eugene and Barbara Sternberg for their "Outstanding Contributions to the Arts."
- In 2002 came an unexpected recognition from Dwell Magazine, which gave Eugene Sternberg a "Nice Modernist Award" for the Arapahoe Acres Subdivision, which had just been designated a National Historic District of Modernist Architecture.
- May 19, 2004 – Historic Littleton Inc. and the Englewood Historical Society honored Eugene Sternberg with a dinner and exhibition of his work for "a lifetime of architectural achievement and community service."
- October 16, 2004 - Eugene and Barbara Sternberg were elected to the Jefferson County Historical Commission Hall of Fame as Historical Authors and Community Advocates.
