= St. Mary's Church (St. Benedict, Kansas) =

Historic church in Kansas, United States

- U.S. National Register of Historic Places
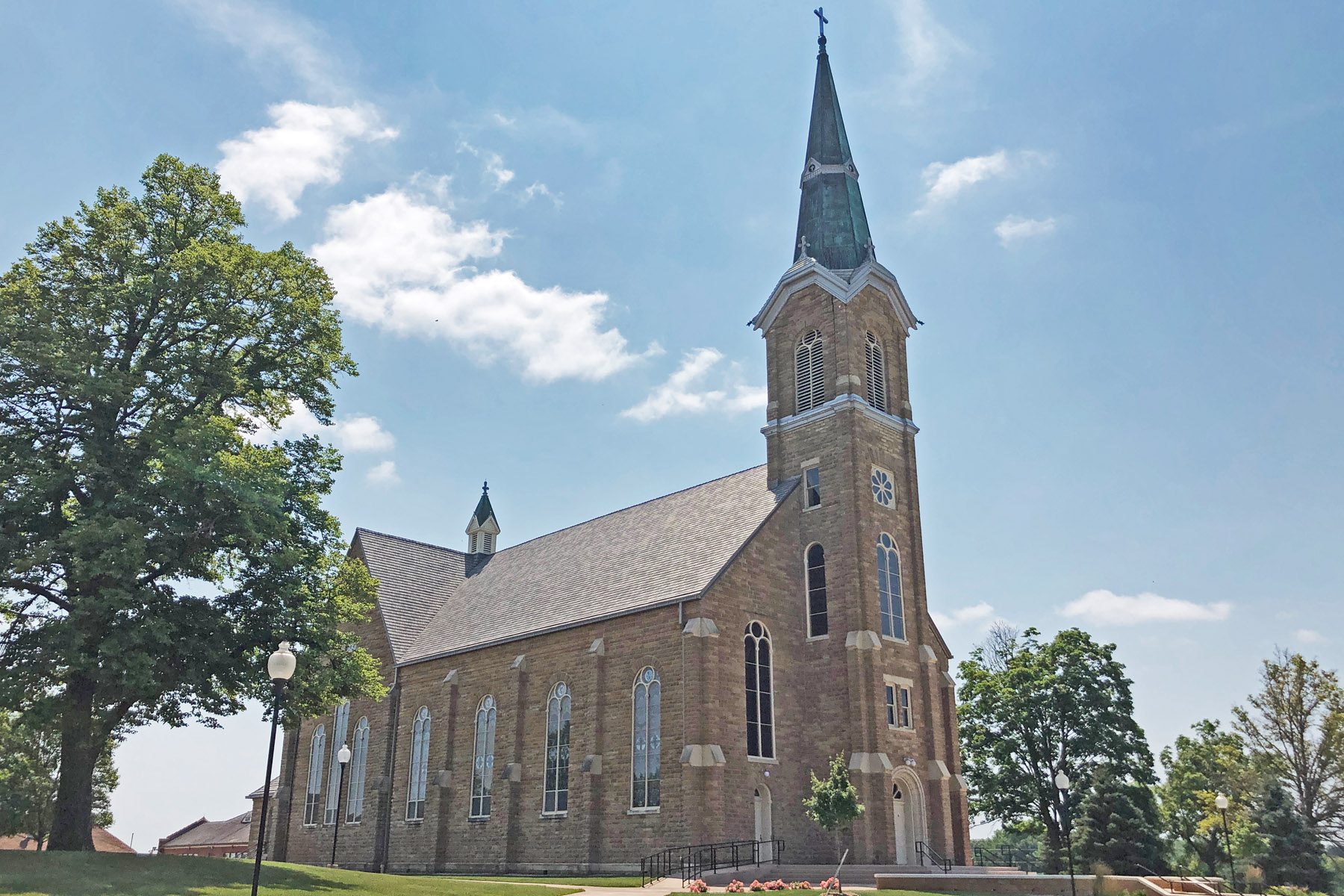

- Location within Kansas Location within the United States
- Location: 9208 Main St. St. Benedict, Kansas
- Coordinates: 39°53′08″N 96°05′53″W
- Built: 1893
- Architectural style: Gothic hall-church
- NRHP reference No.: 80001470
- Added to NRHP: December 5, 1980

St. Mary's Church is a church in the unincorporated community of St. Benedict, Kansas, 3 miles north of the west edge of Seneca. It is part of the Roman Catholic Archdiocese of Kansas City in Kansas. It was built in 1893 and added to the National Register of Historic Places in 1980. It is a prominent local landmark as it is upon a hill and its bell tower rises 172.5 feet (52.6 m). It is a stone building which is 162 by 60 feet (49 m × 18 m) in plan.

== Gallery ==
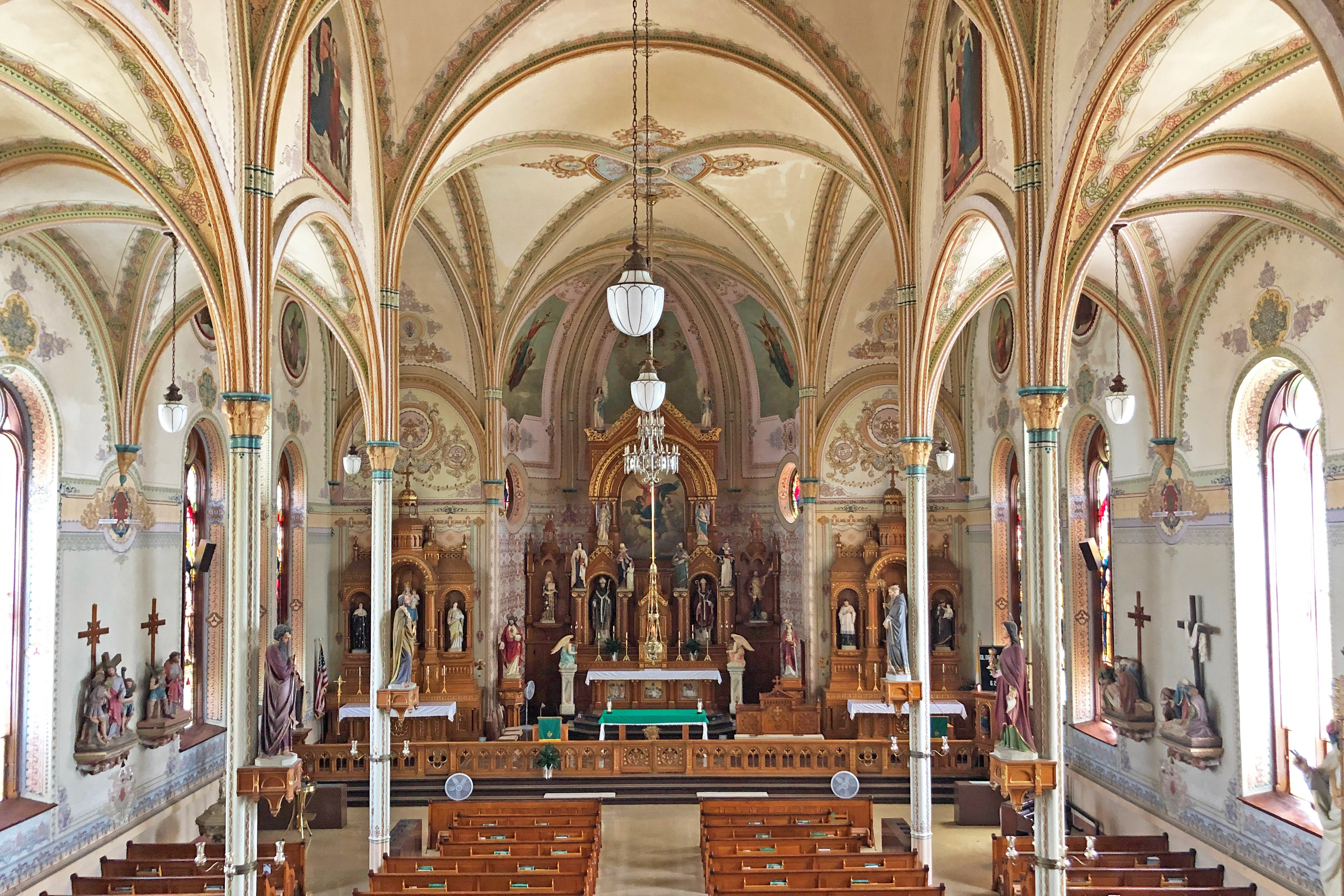
View up the nave toward the chancel

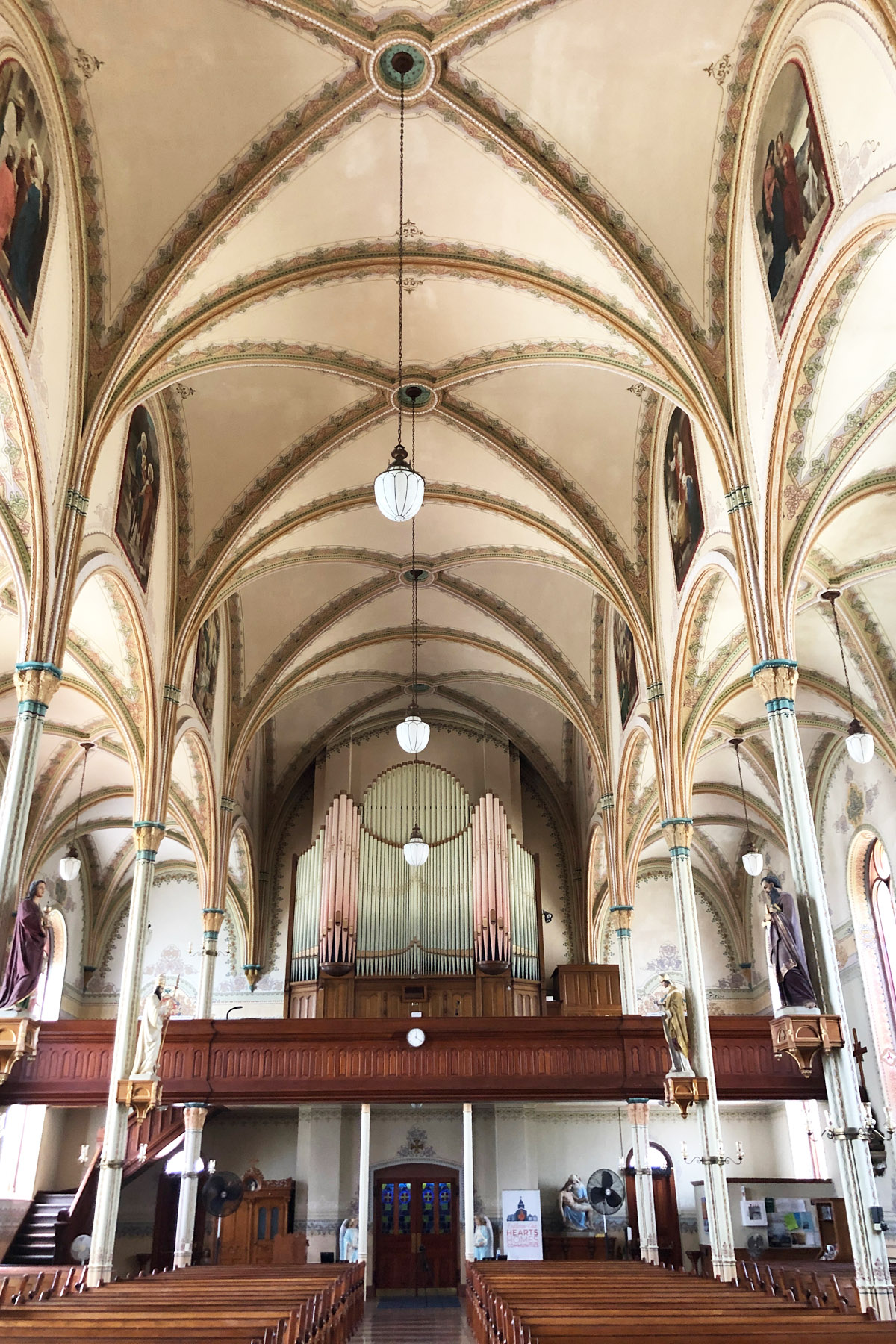
View down the nave toward gallery

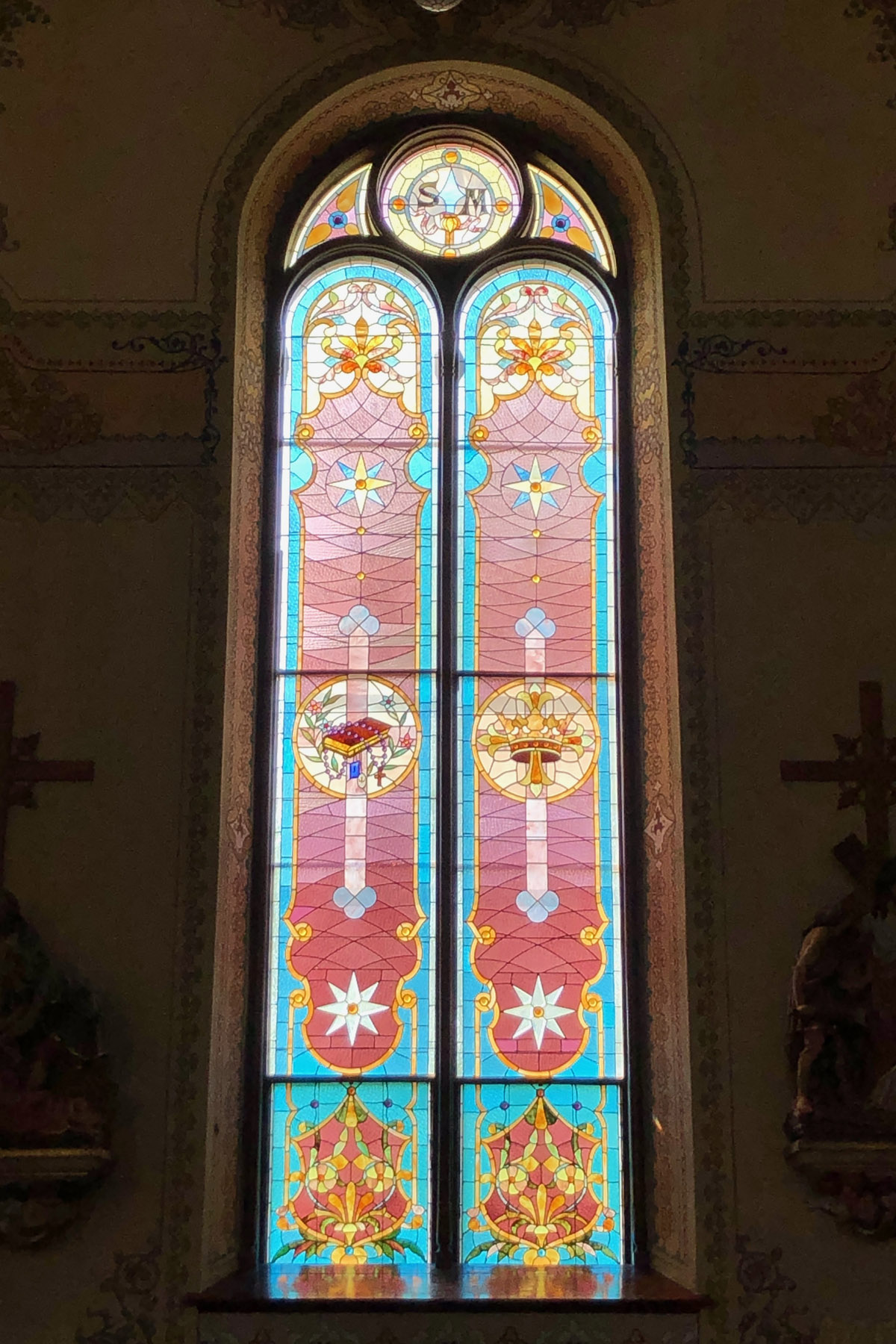
Stained glass window in the nave

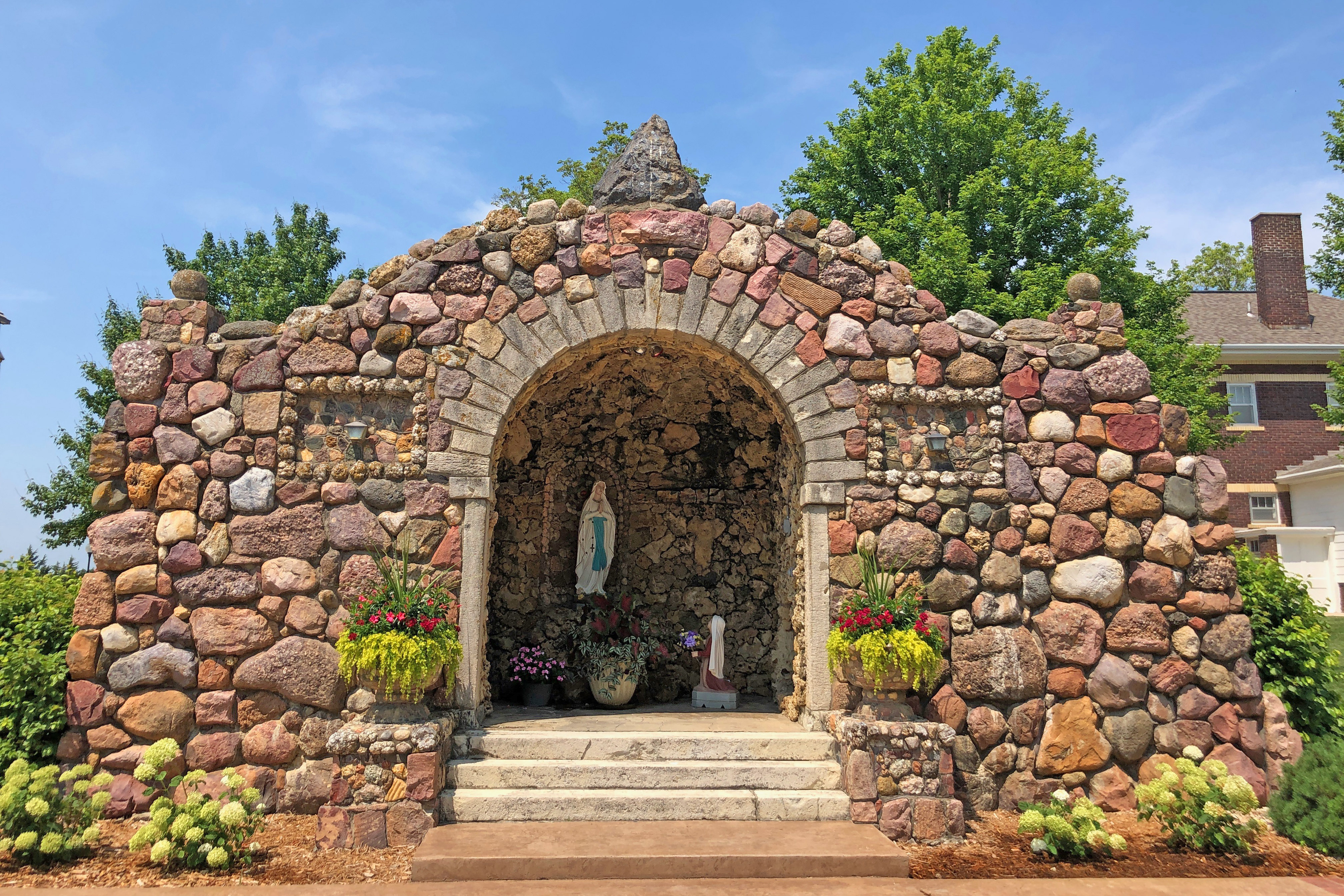
Grotto

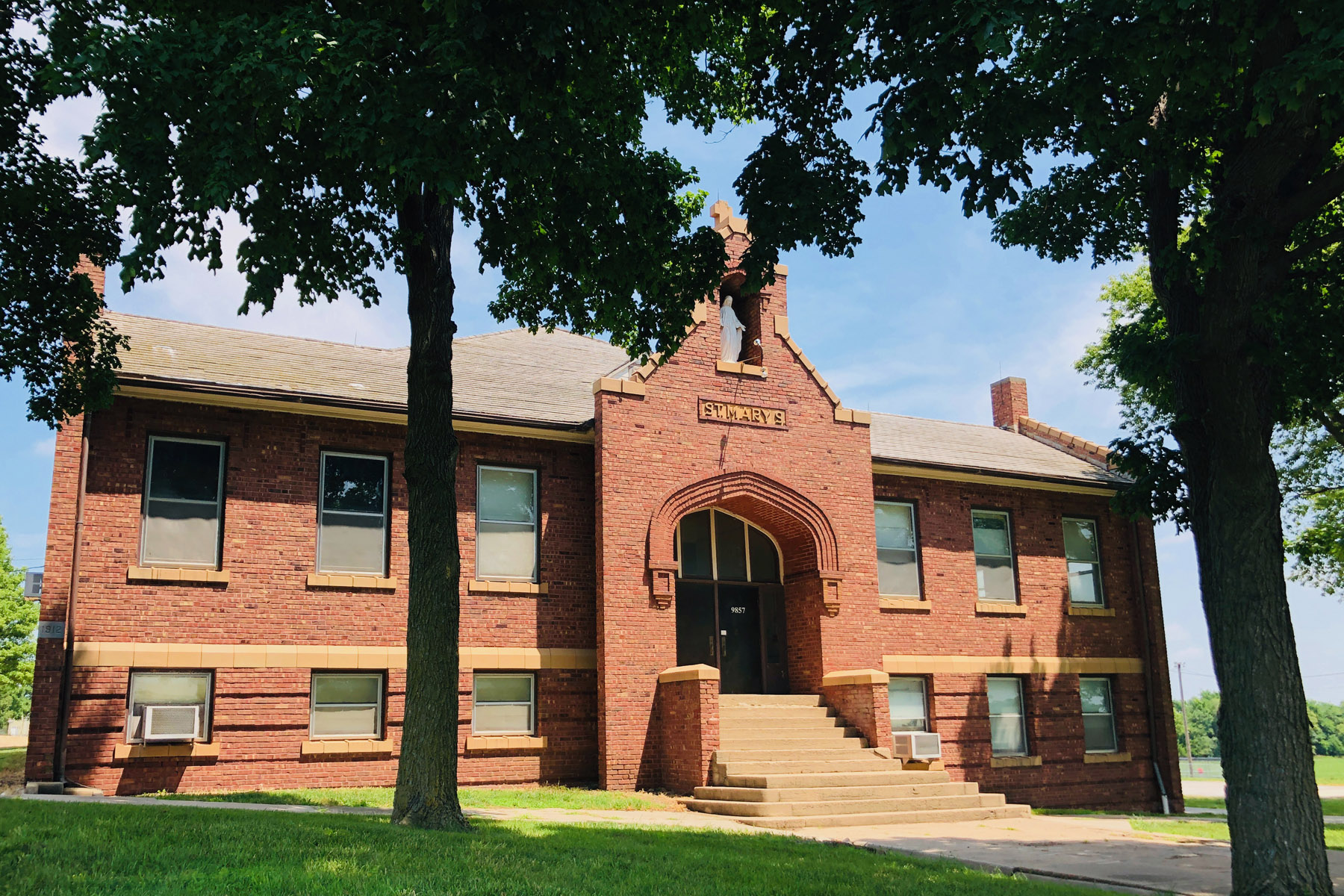
School
